= Lynch Canyon Open Space Park =

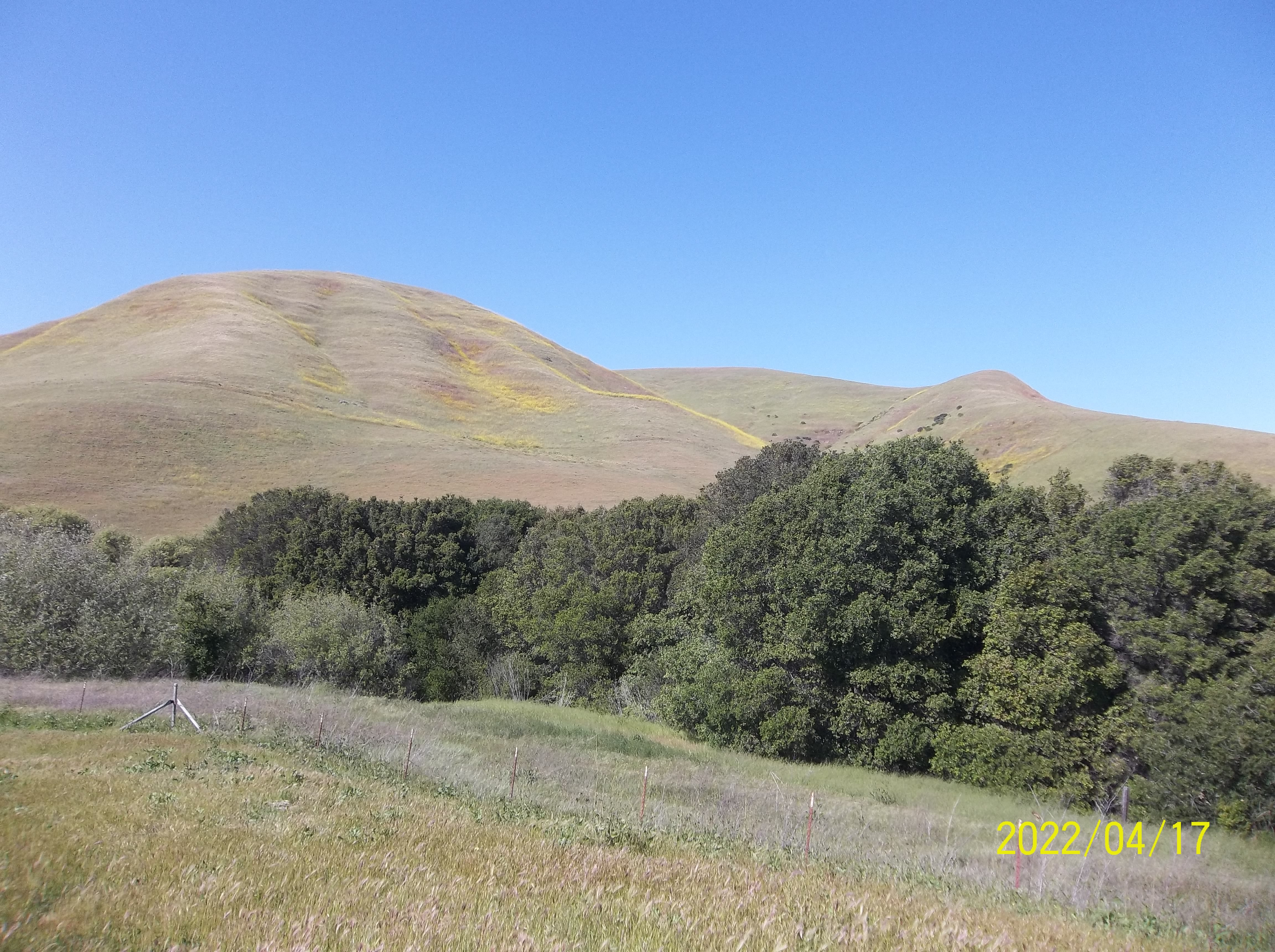
- A view of a wooded creekbed with flower-covered hills in the backdrop

- Location within California Location within the United States
- Location: Solano County, California
- Nearest city: Fairfield
- Coordinates: 38.191°N 122.197°W
- Area: 1,309-acre (5.30 km^{2})

Lynch Canyon Open Space Park is a park in Solano County, California.

== History ==
It is named for the Matthew Lynch family, who owned the land in the early 1900s. Before that, the land was owned by General Mariano Guadalupe Vallejo, and in precolonial times, by the Patwin people. Traces of native presence including bedrock mortars can be observed. Lynch Canyon Open Space Park has been operated by the Solano County Parks and Recreation Division and the Solano Land Trust since 2007.

== Wildlife and attractions ==
Its trails are part of the Bay Area Ridge Trail. The park is known for its spring wildflowers and oak trees, and birds of prey which hunt over the open fields. The land is active grazing land for cattle, so dogs are banned on park land.

== Gallery ==
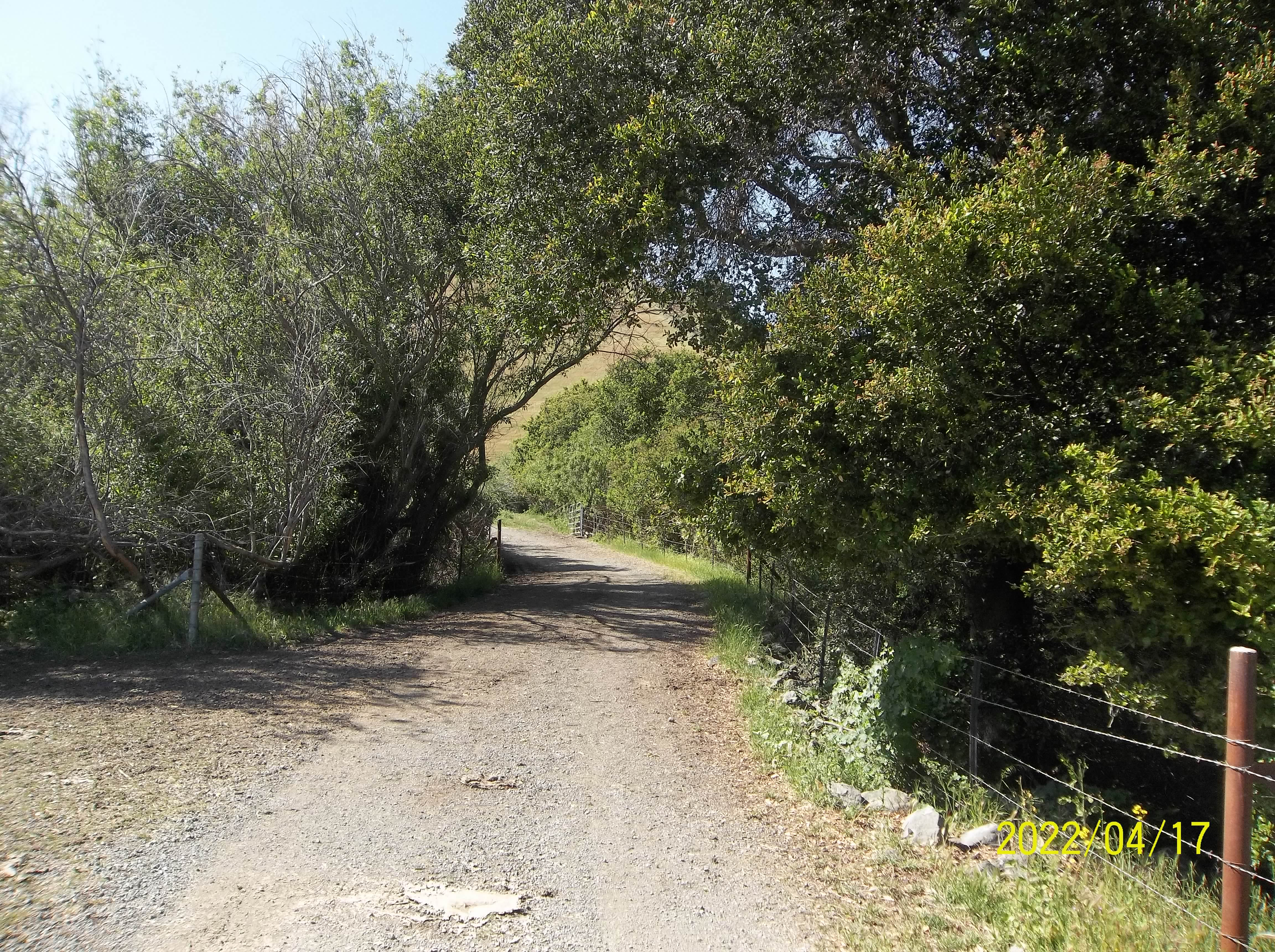
Lynch Road

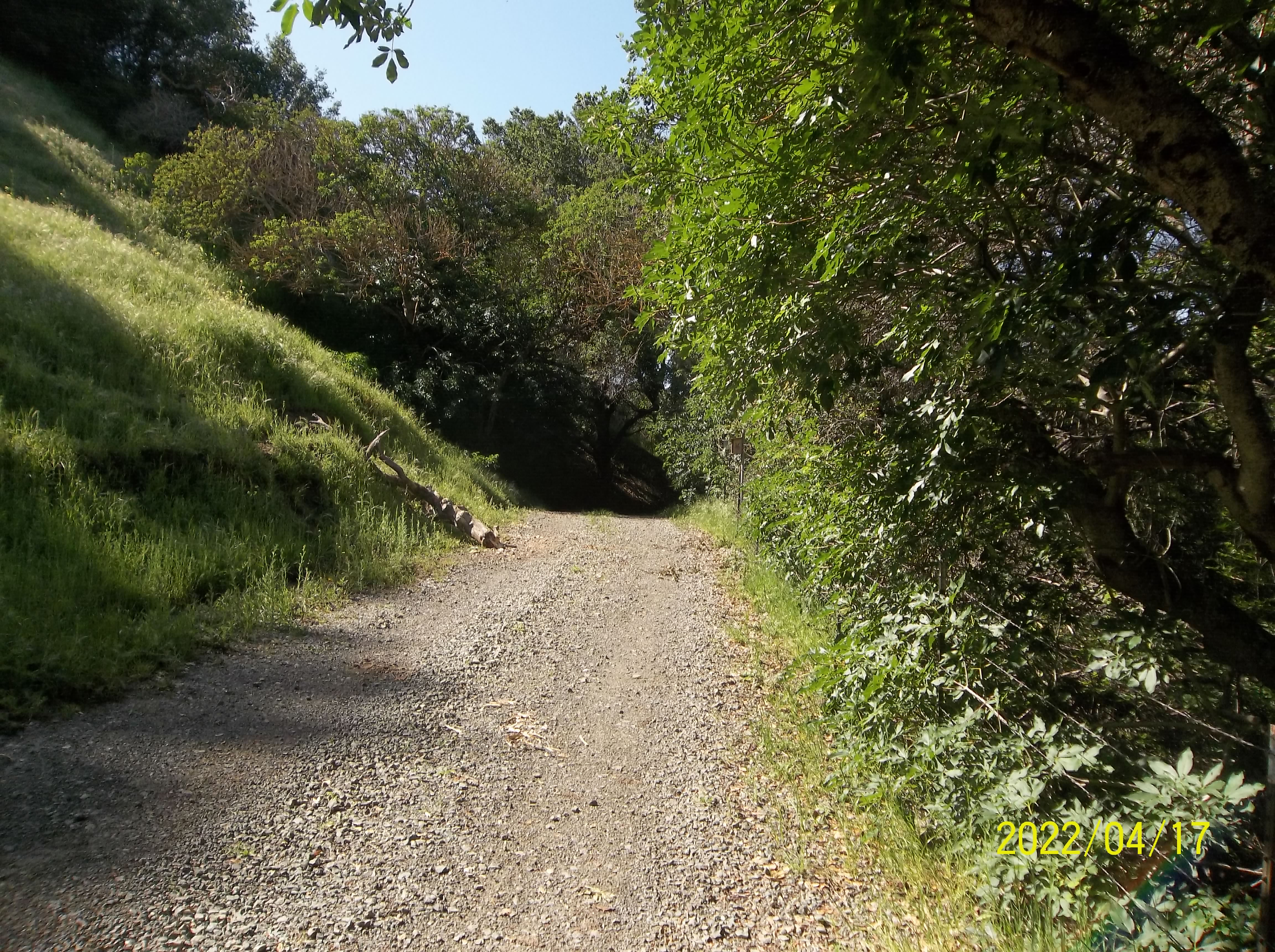

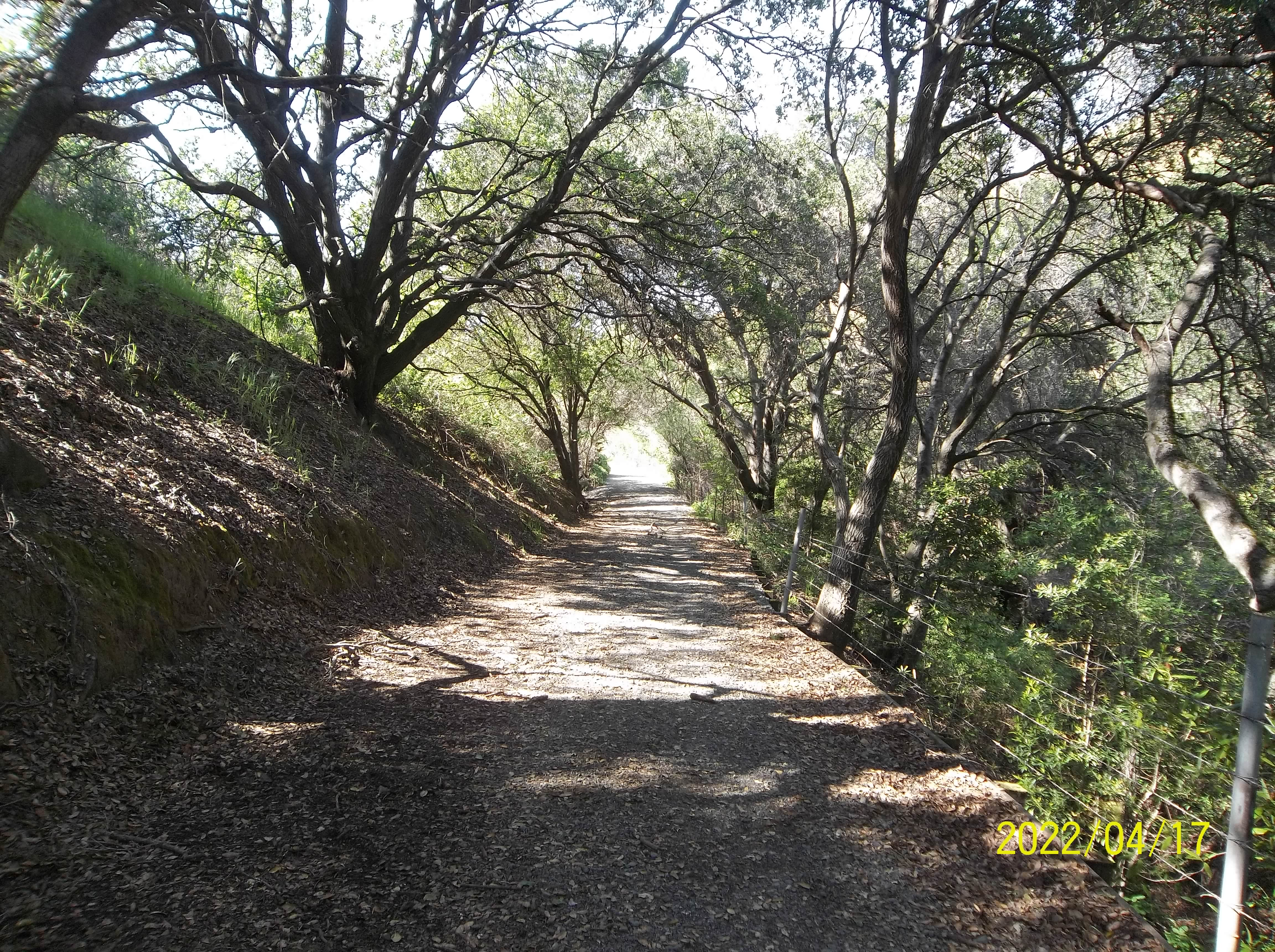

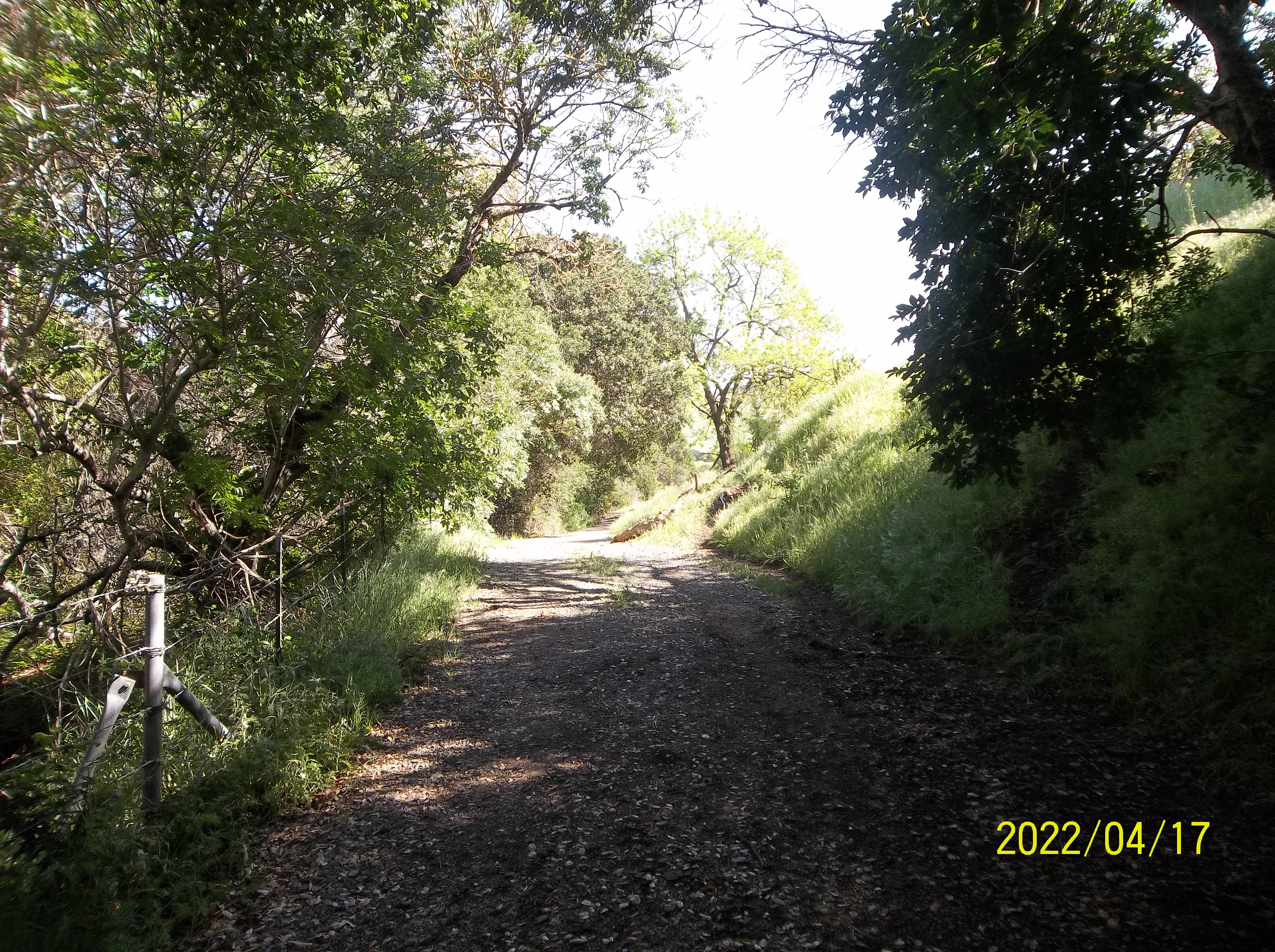

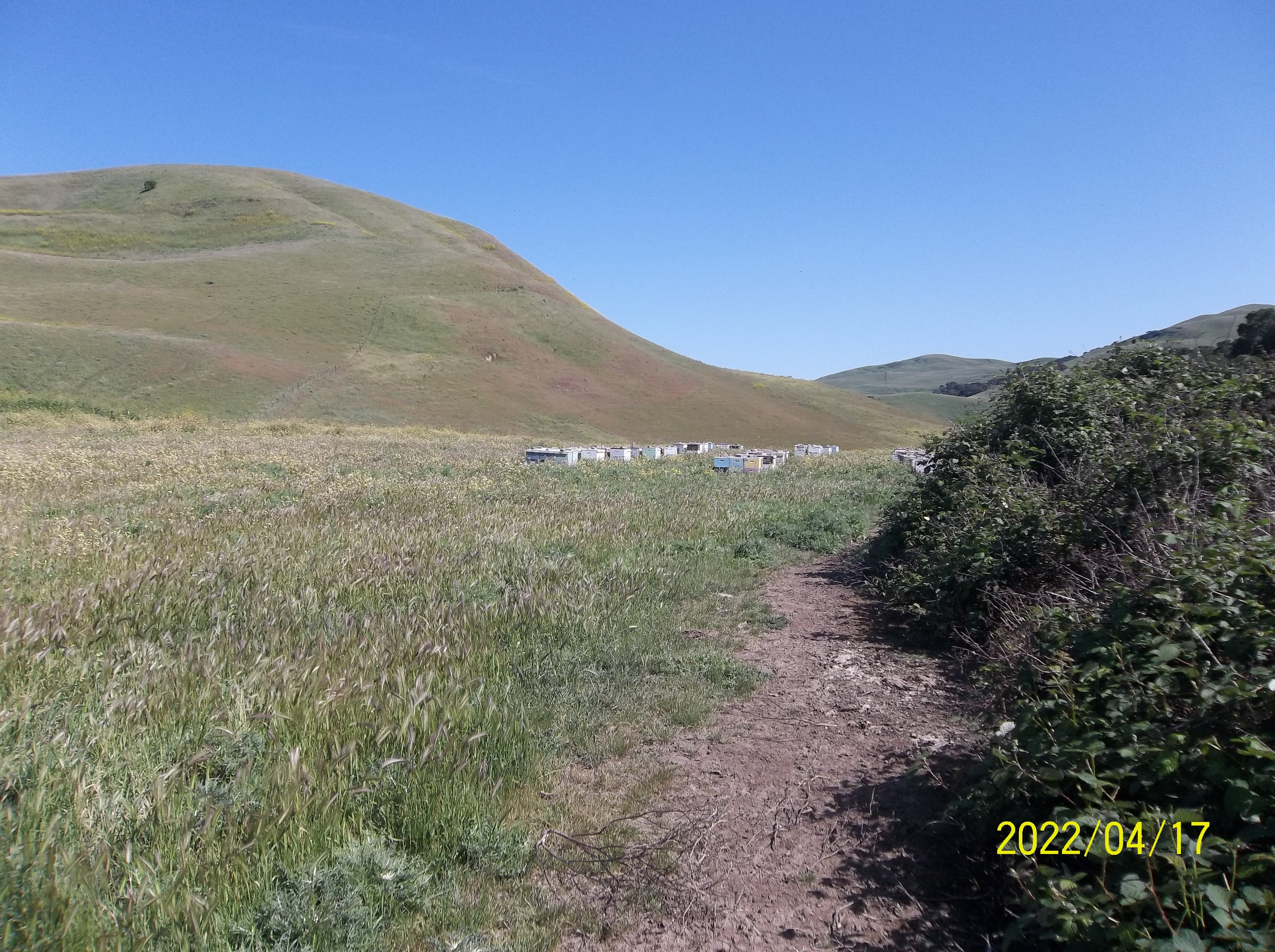
Beehives

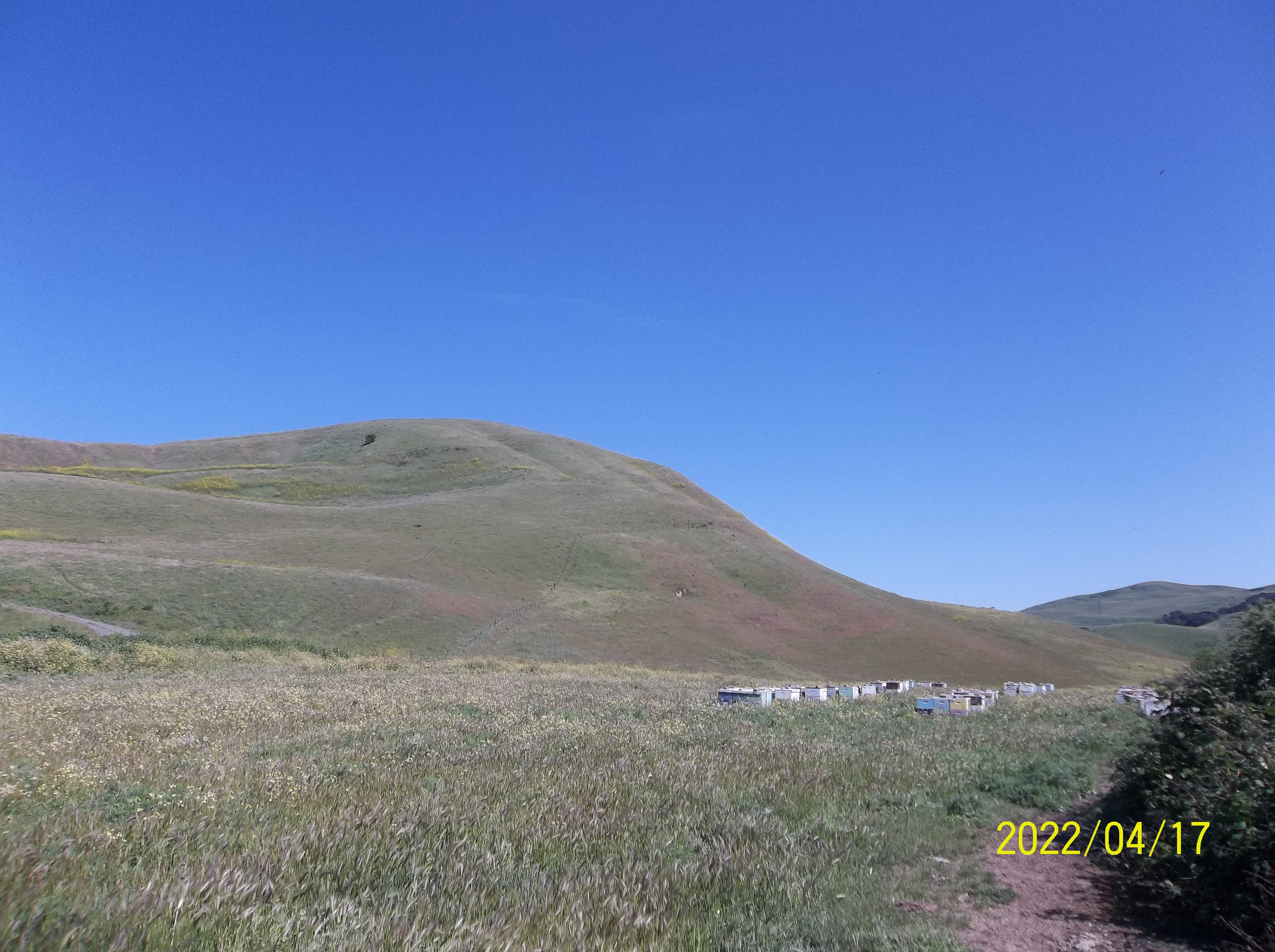

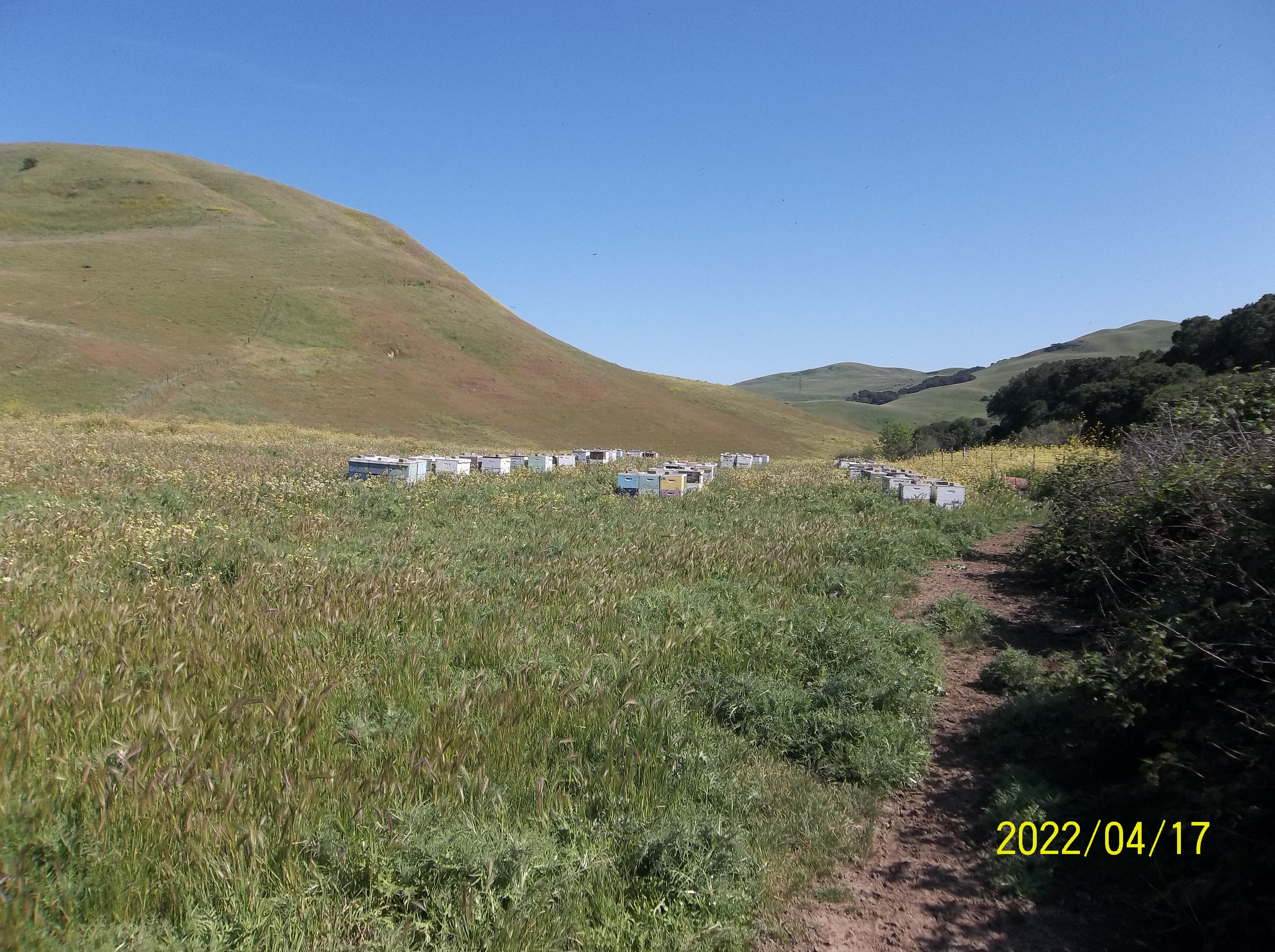

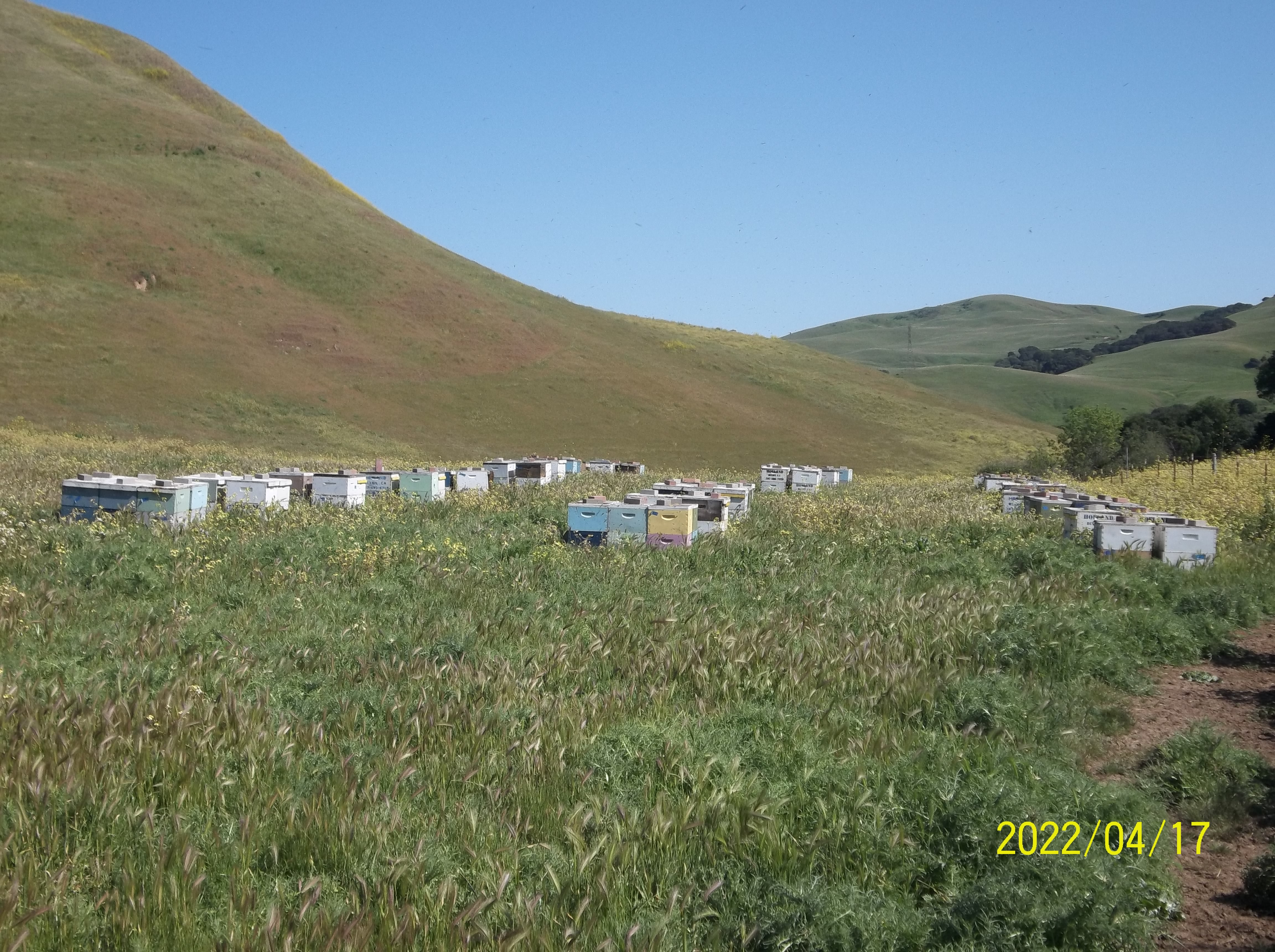

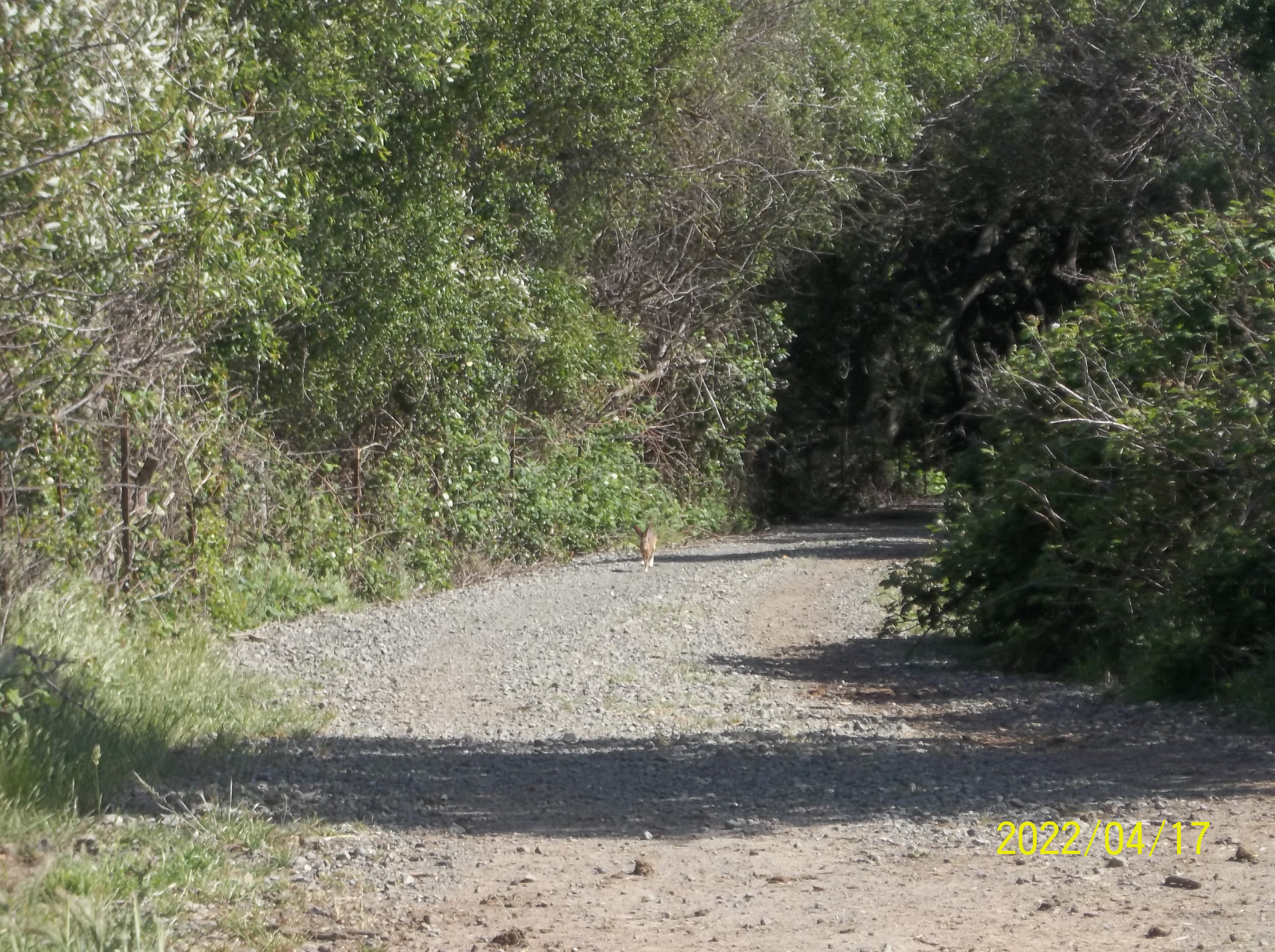
A hare on Lynch Road

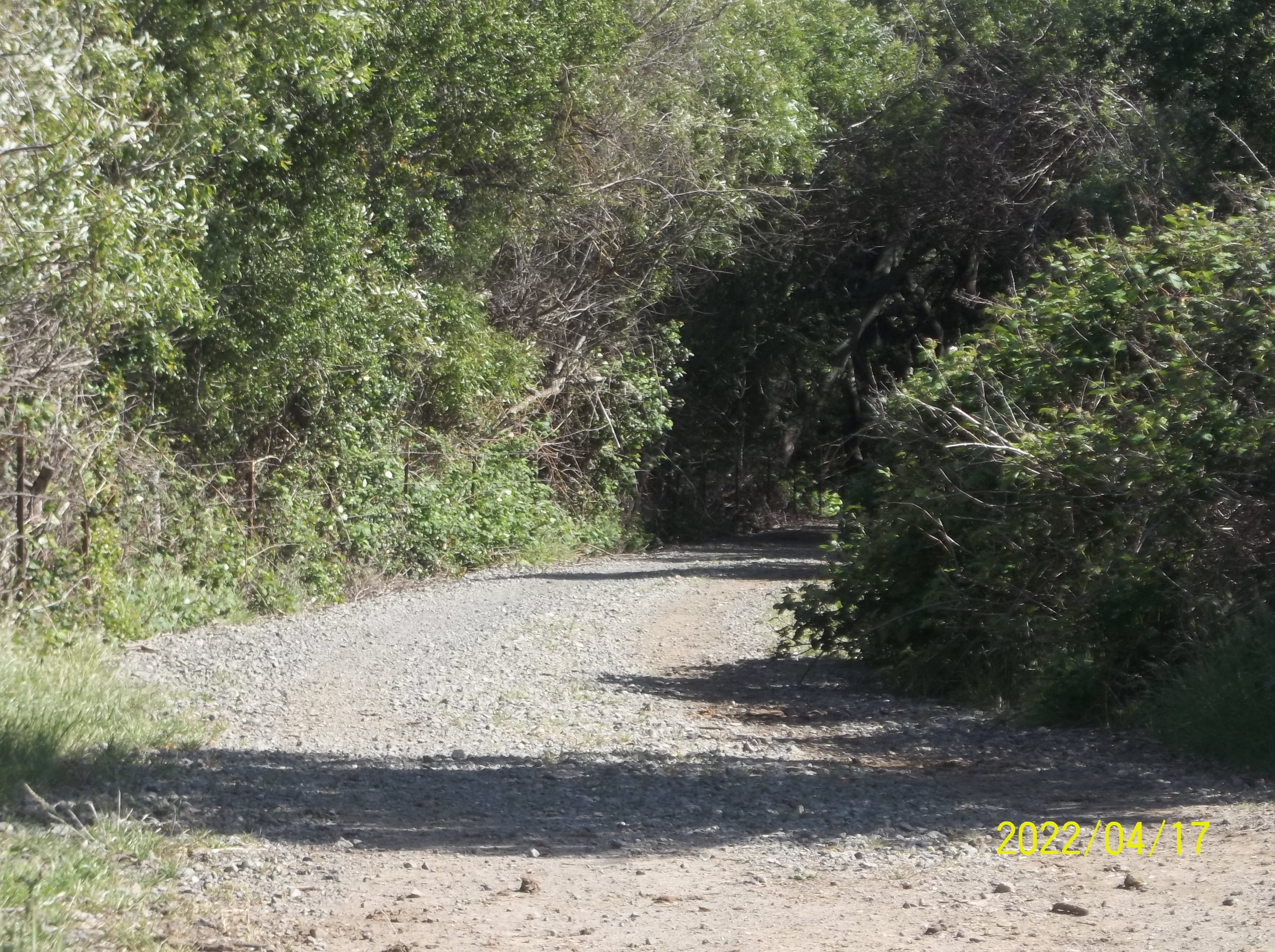

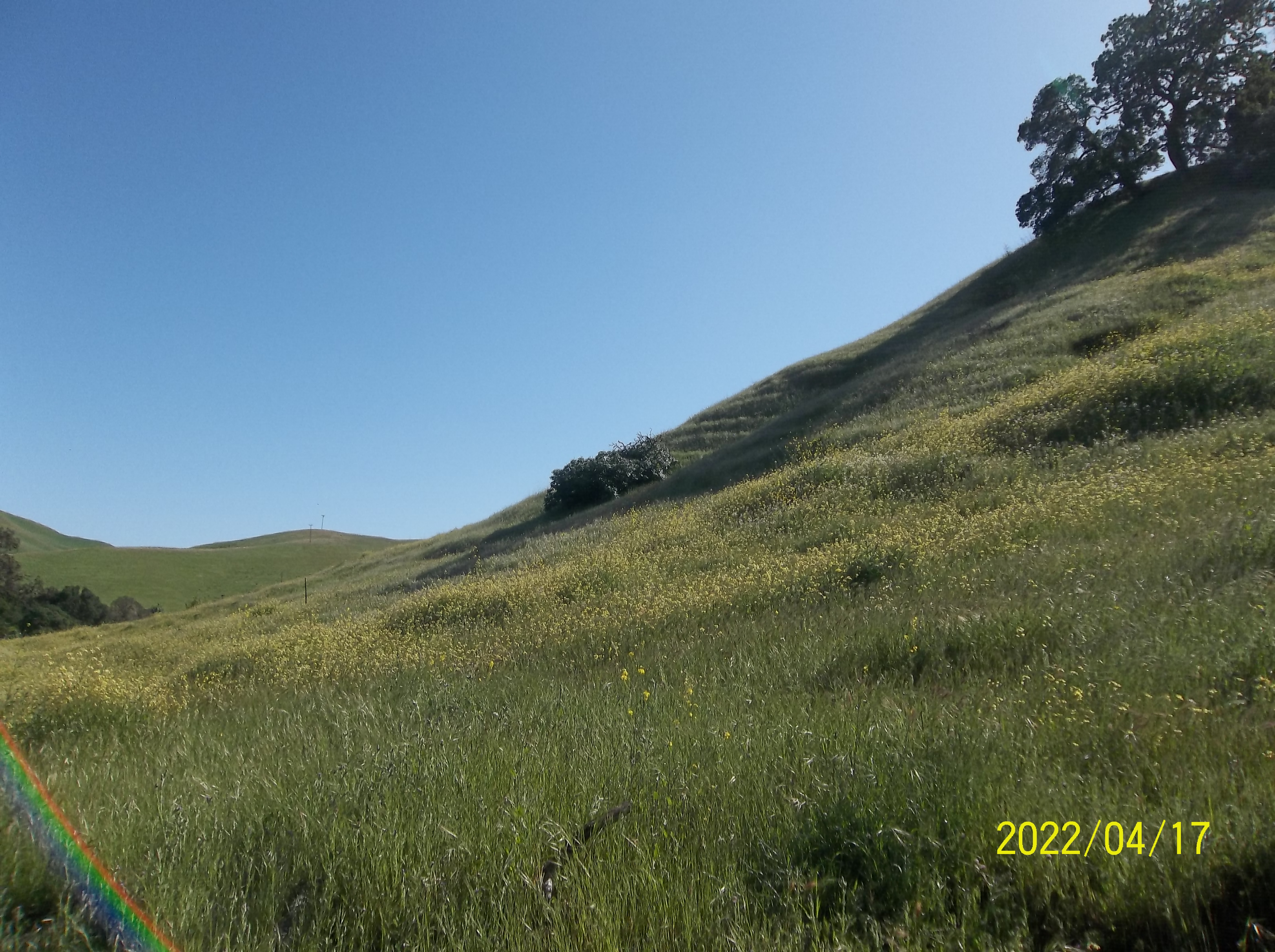

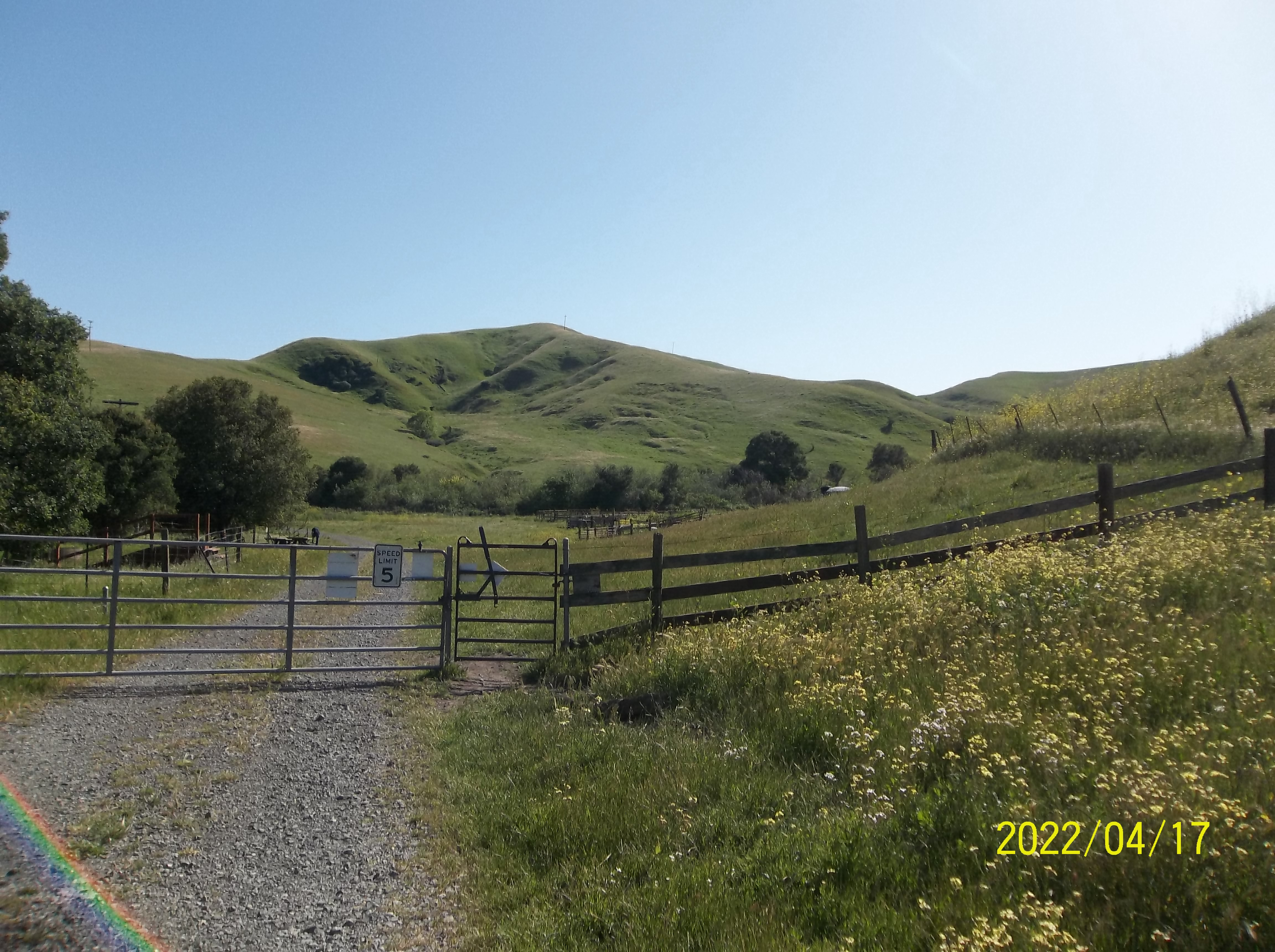
A fence across Lynch Road

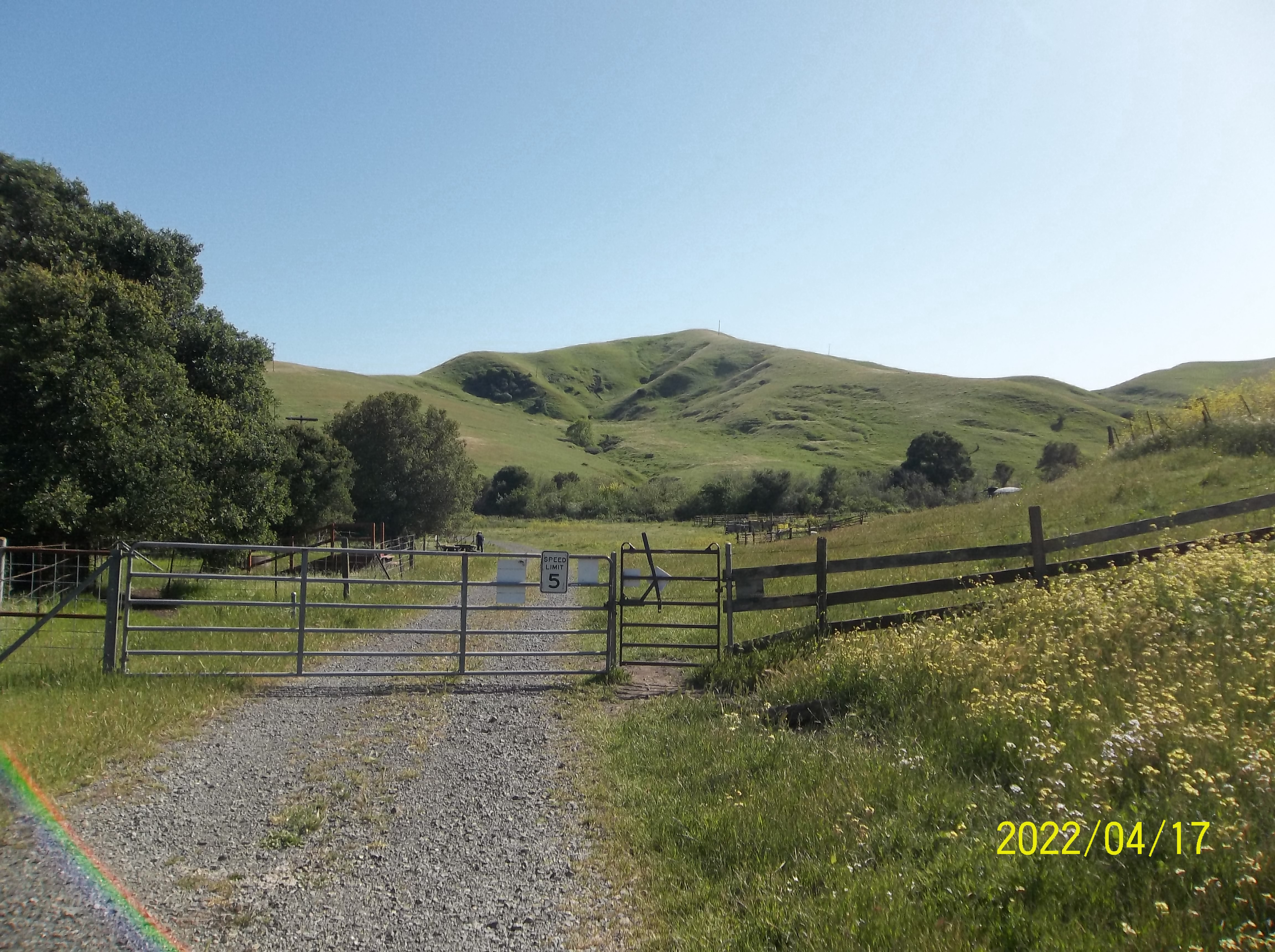

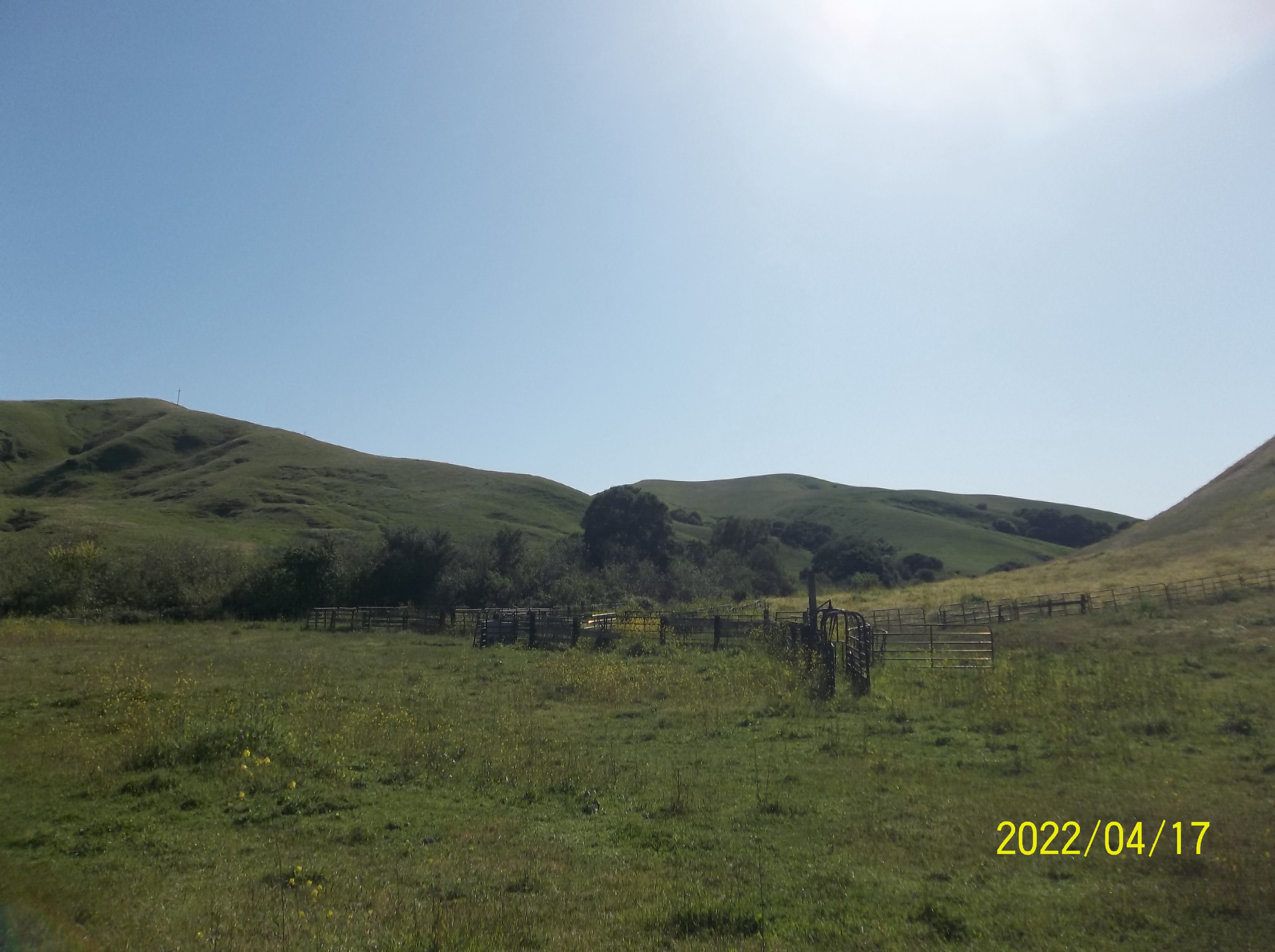

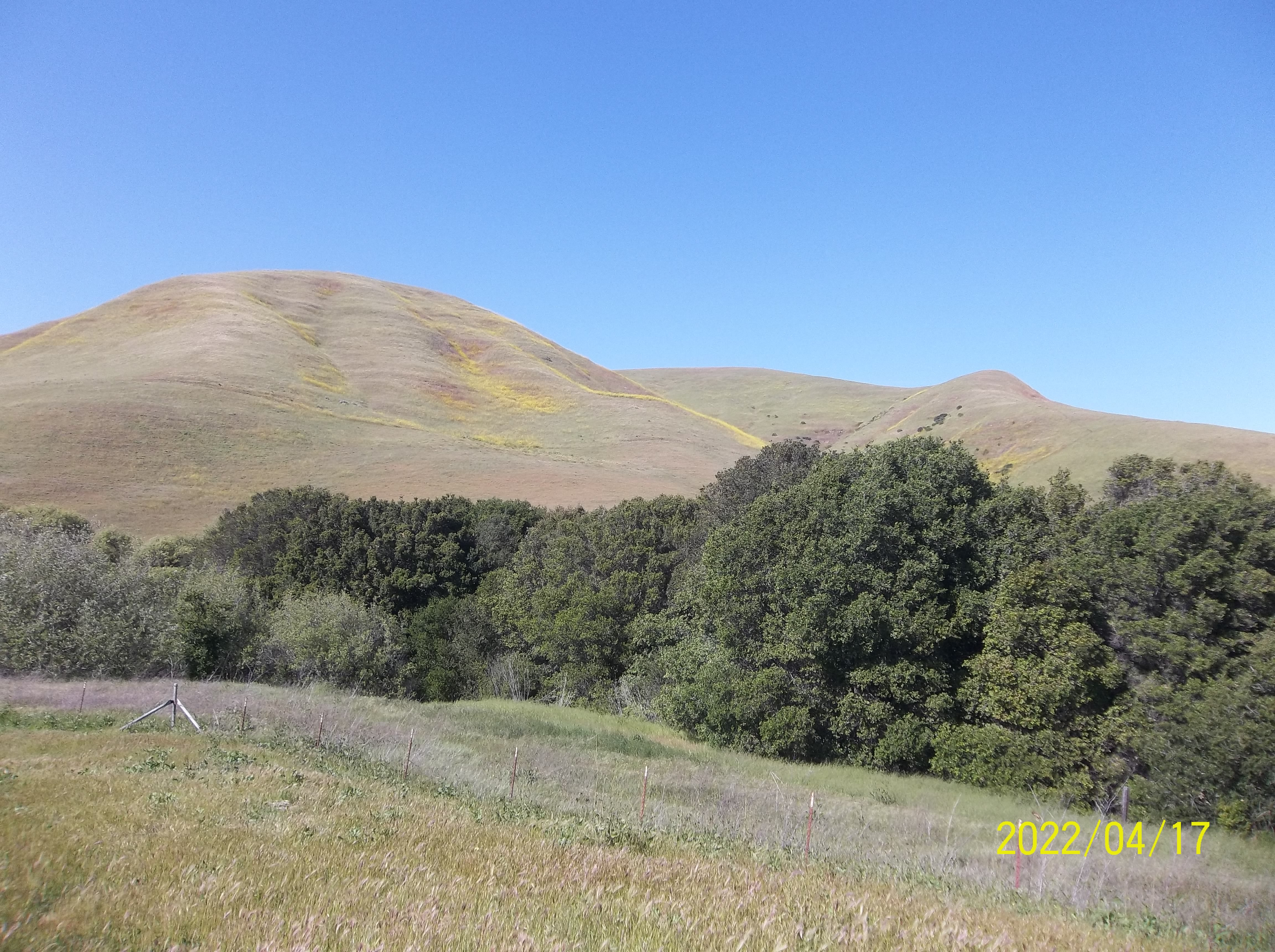
