= California State Route 35 =

Highway in California

State Route 35
- Skyline Boulevard
- SR 35 highlighted in red

Route information
- Maintained by Caltrans
- Length: 54.056 mi (86.995 km) The length of SR 35 is broken into pieces and do not reflect overlaps.
- Tourist routes: Skyline Boulevard from the Santa Cruz–Santa Clara County line to SR 92

Major junctions
- South end: SR 17 near Redwood Estates
- SR 84 in Woodside; SR 92 near San Mateo; I-280 from near Hillsborough to San Bruno; SR 1 in Daly City
- North end: SR 1 in San Francisco

Location
- Country: United States
- State: California
- Counties: Santa Clara, Santa Cruz, San Mateo, San Francisco

Highway system
- State highways in California; Interstate; US; State; Scenic; History; Pre‑1964; Unconstructed; Deleted; Freeways
← SR 34	→ SR 36

State Route 35 (SR 35), generally known as Skyline Boulevard for most of its length, is a mostly two-lane state highway in the U.S. state of California. It runs along the ridge of the Santa Cruz Mountains from the high point of State Route 17 near Lexington Reservoir in Santa Clara County to State Route 1 just south of Daly City in San Mateo County, where it crosses SR 1 and loops around Lake Merced to become Sloat Boulevard in San Francisco. SR 35 then continues along Sloat Boulevard until it reaches its terminus when it meets SR 1 again at 19th Avenue.

Because of its high elevation and location, it is one of the few places on the southern portion of the San Francisco Peninsula from which the San Francisco Bay and the Pacific Ocean are both visible at the same time. It also provides scenic views of the Silicon Valley metropolitan area.

It was originally designated State Route 5 (SR 5), but was re-numbered with the creation of Interstate 5 (I-5) as part of the 1964 state highway renumbering to avert confusion.

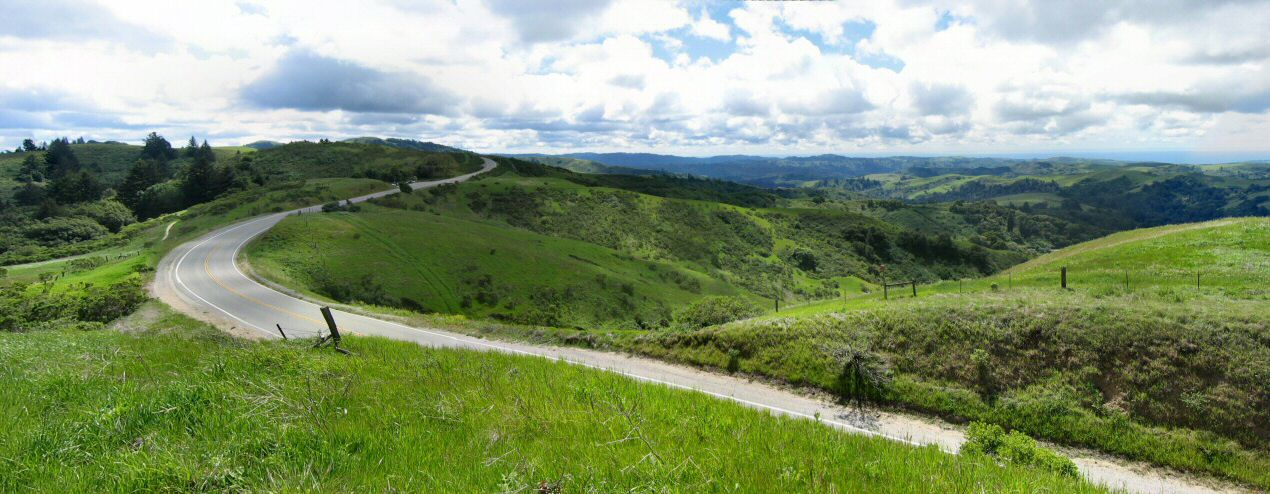
Skyline Boulevard stretches through the Santa Cruz Mountains, here near Palo Alto.

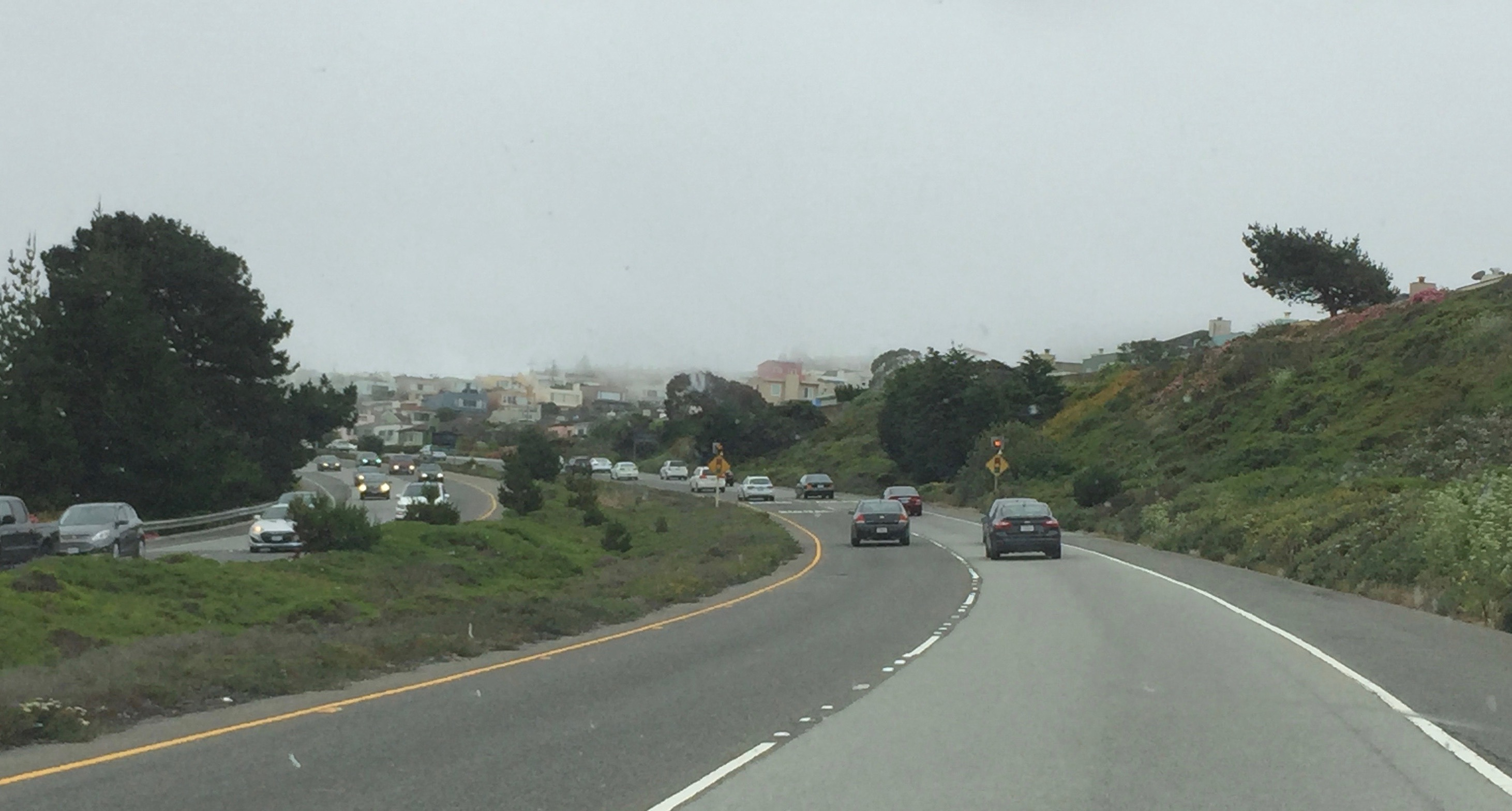
SR 35 briefly becomes a divided highway west of Daly City.

== Route description ==
Route 35 is defined in section 335 of the California Streets and Highways Code. The definition omits the concurrencies with other routes instead of duplicating those segments in those other routes' definitions in the code:

Route 35 is from:
(a) Route 17 at Summit Road to Route 92 via Skyline Boulevard.
(b) Route 92 to Route 280 at Bunker Hill Drive.
(c) Route 280 via Skyline Boulevard to Route 1 in San Francisco.

The highway begins at the junction of Summit Road and State Route 17, at Patchen Pass. While SR 17 traverses the pass outright, SR 35 primarily is on the ridgeline. The portion of SR 35 from SR 17 to Bear Creek Road is called Summit Road. The highway then merges with Bear Creek Road for a few miles before becoming Skyline Boulevard. It bears the name Skyline Boulevard for a majority of its route along the ridge of the Santa Cruz Mountains to the west of Silicon Valley, passing by cities such as San Jose, Saratoga, and Palo Alto. The southern portion of the road, starting at Highway 17 and ending at Black Road, is mostly a narrow and winding country road without a double-yellow line. However, the road has been upgraded to 2 lanes beginning at Black Road, and remains in this configuration until it merges with Interstate 280 north of California State Route 92. The road reaches its highest elevation near Sanborn Skyline County Park at about 3,000 ft (914 m). The road passes through the small community of Sky Londa where it intersects State Route 84. The ridge that the road follows forms the border between Santa Cruz and Santa Clara counties. However, the boundary is so irregular that the road weaves in and out of the two counties.

The ridgetop portion of the route ends at the junction with State Route 92, because this northern area of the Santa Cruz Mountains is a protected watershed owned by the San Francisco Water Department. Highway 35 is co-routed with SR 92 for 2 miles (3 km) east, descending towards Crystal Springs Reservoir, which it crosses on a causeway, and then joins Interstate 280 northbound for 6 miles (10 km). However, on the southbound side, Route 35 exists as a separate road to the west of the freeway between Bunker Hill Dr. and Route 92, as there is no connector road between 280 South and 92 West.

Route 35 departs from 280 at the southern end of San Bruno, running to the west of the freeway, regaining the ridgetop separating South San Francisco and Daly City from Pacifica.

It crosses State Route 1 in Daly City and in San Francisco, Skyline Boulevard ends and the highway briefly continues along Sloat Boulevard until it reaches its terminus when it intersects Highway 1 again at 19th Avenue.

SR 35 is part of the California Freeway and Expressway System, but is not part of the National Highway System, a network of highways that are considered essential to the country's economy, defense, and mobility by the Federal Highway Administration. SR 35 is eligible for the State Scenic Highway System; however, only the portion from the Santa Cruz–Santa Clara County line to the SR 92 junction is officially designated as a scenic highway by the California Department of Transportation, meaning that it is a substantial section of highway passing through a "memorable landscape" with no "visual intrusions", where the potential designation has gained popular favor with the community.

=== Recreational use ===
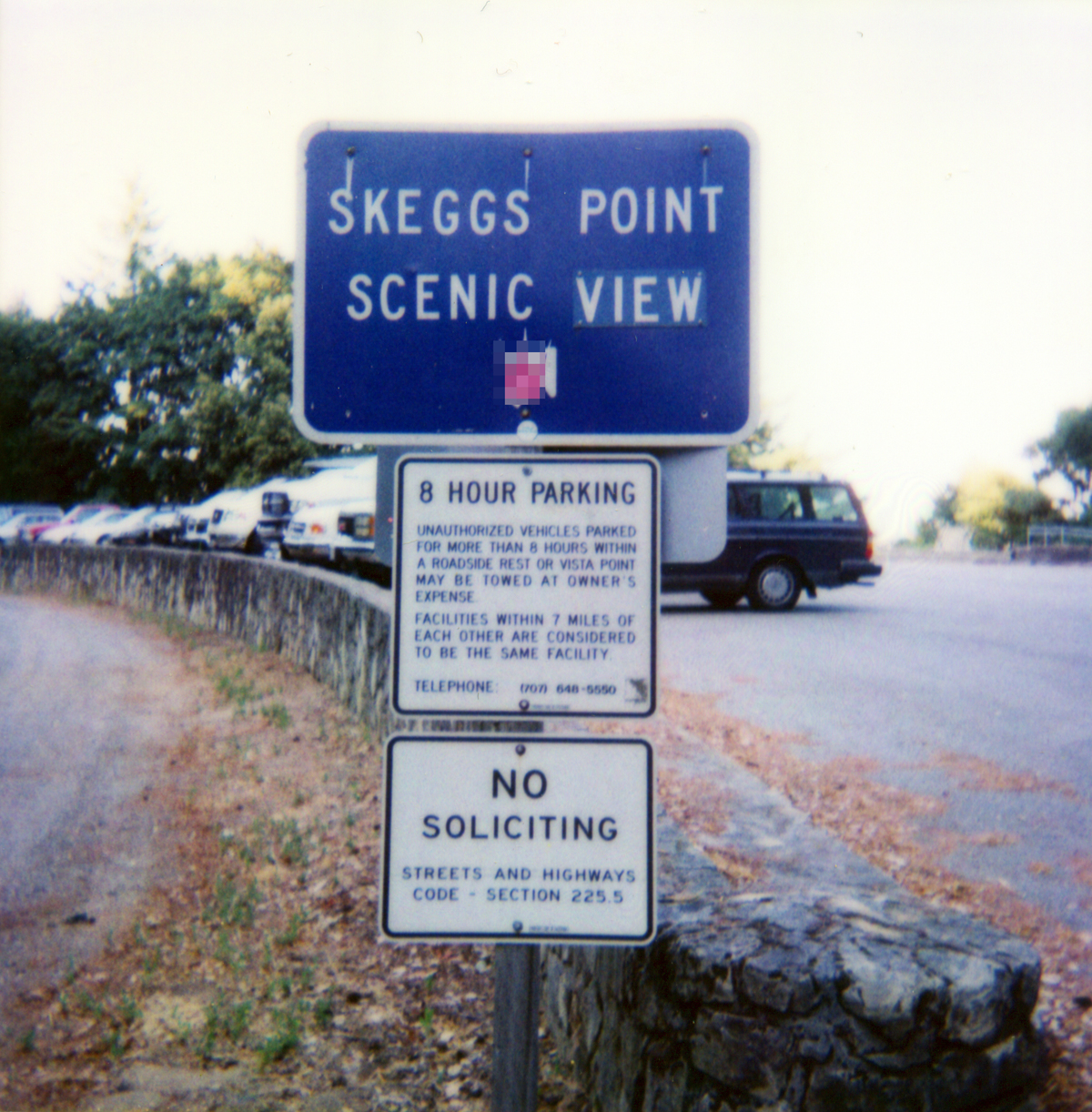
The popular Skeggs Point turnout north of SR 84

Because of its scenic views and winding roadway, Skyline Boulevard and surrounding roads see substantial recreational motoring and bicycling use. Many sports cars and motorcycles can be found congregating near the intersections with State Route 9 and State Route 84, particularly on weekends. Mountain bikers are also commonly found at the many trailheads along the road.

Several public open spaces border on Skyline Boulevard, including Sanborn County Park, Windy Hill, and the Purisima Open Space; both the latter are parts of the Midpeninsula Regional Open Space District. Numerous hiking trails originate from parking lots off Skyline in these open spaces.

Whenever there is snow on the road's higher elevations, many people take their families up to see and play in the snow, and therefore, many of the parking lots at regional parks are packed with cars.

=== Other landmarks ===
For most of the route, State Route 35 offers vistas of both San Francisco Bay and the Pacific Ocean. The route passes through or by several Midpeninsula Regional Open Space District preserves and other parks, from south to north:

- Bear Creek Redwoods Open Space Preserve
- Sanborn-Skyline County Park (Santa Cruz county)
- Castle Rock State Park
- Saratoga Gap Open Space Preserve
- Long Ridge Open Space Preserve
- Skyline Ridge Open Space Preserve
- Monte Bello Open Space Preserve
- Coal Creek Open Space Preserve
- Russian Ridge Open Space Preserve
- Windy Hill Open Space Preserve
- La Honda Creek Open Space Preserve
- Wunderlich County Park (San Mateo county)
- El Corte de Madera Creek Open Space Preserve
- Huddart County Park (San Mateo county)
- Purisima Creek Redwoods Open Space Preserve
- Miramontes Ridge Open Space Preserve

A number of streams originate near Skyline Boulevard, flowing to both Pacific Ocean and the Bay. Among the bayside streams are San Francisquito Creek, Redwood Creek, and San Bruno Creek.

== History ==
The original road called State Route 35 was located in southern California and ran north to south from State Route 22 (Garden Grove Boulevard) in Orange County to U.S. 99 (Garvey Avenue), first along Los Alamitos Boulevard going north which, after entering Los Angeles County, turns into Norwalk Boulevard. Route 35 continued west on Centralia Street and then north along Pioneer Boulevard until hitting San Antonio Drive at Rosecrans Avenue. San Antonio Drive would turn back into Norwalk Boulevard and continue with that street name until turning into Old Mill Road at Beverly Boulevard. Route 35 would wind through Rose Hills and Avocado Heights as Workman Mill Road and would then turn into Puente Avenue at Valley Boulevard where it would continue to its end at U.S. 99 (which was concurrent with U.S. Routes 60 and 70) at the border of Baldwin Park and West Covina.

The current State Route 35, Skyline Boulevard, was originally designated State Route 5. The number was changed in the 1964 renumbering in California. On February 10, 2017, a huge washout washed away a 220-foot stretch of SR 35 about five miles south of the junction with State Route 9. Repairs were completed and the section of road re-opened January 9, 2018.

== Major intersections ==
Except where prefixed with a letter, postmiles were measured on the road as it was in 1964, based on the alignment that existed at the time, and do not necessarily reflect current mileage. R reflects a realignment in the route since then, M indicates a second realignment, L refers to an overlap due to a correction or change, and T indicates postmiles classified as temporary. Segments that remain unconstructed or have been relinquished to local control may be omitted. The numbers reset at county lines; the start and end postmiles in each county are given in the county column.

County	Location	Postmile	Exit	Destinations	Notes
Santa Clara; SCL R0.05-0.23	Lexington Hills	R0.05		Summit Road	Continuation beyond SR 17
Santa Clara; SCL R0.05-0.23	Lexington Hills	R0.05		SR 17 – San Jose, Santa Cruz	Interchange; south end of SR 35
Santa Cruz; SCR 0.23-7.68		2.87		Bear Creek Road	
Santa Clara; SCL 7.68-17.12	Saratoga Gap	14.10		SR 9 – Big Basin, Boulder Creek, Santa Cruz, Saratoga	
San Mateo		3.21		Alpine Road, Page Mill Road	
San Mateo	Woodside	10.52		SR 84 (La Honda Road) – Woodside, La Honda	
San Mateo		23.04 5.19 (Note: Indicates that the postmile represents the distance along SR 92 rather than SR 35.)		SR 92 west – Half Moon Bay, Santa Cruz	South end of SR 92 overlap
San Mateo		7.19 L21.72		SR 92 east to I-280 – Belmont, San Mateo, San Francisco, San Jose	North end of SR 92 overlap
San Mateo		L22.76 R12.32 (Note: Indicates that the postmile represents the distance along I-280 rather than SR 35.)		I-280 south (Junipero Serra Freeway) / Skyline Boulevard, Bunker Hill Drive – San Jose	Interchange; south end of I-280 overlap; I-280 exit 34
San Mateo		L22.76 R12.32	South end of freeway on I-280		
San Mateo	Hillsborough	R14.22	36	Black Mountain Road, Hayne Road	
San Mateo		R17.16	39	Trousdale Drive – Burlingame	
San Mateo	Millbrae	R17.92	40	Millbrae Avenue	Northbound exit and southbound entrance
San Mateo	Millbrae	R18.52	41	Larkspur Drive, Millbrae Avenue	Southbound exit and northbound entrance
San Mateo	San Bruno	R19.28 R23.04	North end of freeway on I-280		
San Mateo	San Bruno	R19.28 R23.04		I-280 north (Junipero Serra Freeway) – San Francisco	Interchange; north end of I-280 overlap; northbound exit and southbound entrance; I-280 north exit 41
San Mateo	Pacifica		South end of freeway		
San Mateo	Daly City	R28.69	54	SR 1 to I-280 – San Jose, San Francisco, Pacifica, Santa Cruz	Signed as exits 54A (north) and 54B (south); SR 1 exits 508A-B
San Mateo	Daly City		North end of freeway		
San Mateo	Daly City	30.83		John Daly Boulevard – Westlake District	
City and County of San Francisco; SF 0.00-3.16				Great Highway – Beach	Serves the San Francisco Zoo
City and County of San Francisco; SF 0.00-3.16		1.83		Sloat Boulevard	
City and County of San Francisco; SF 0.00-3.16		2.12		Sunset Boulevard	Interchange
City and County of San Francisco; SF 0.00-3.16		3.16		SR 1 (19th Avenue) – San Mateo, Golden Gate Park	North end of SR 35
City and County of San Francisco; SF 0.00-3.16		3.16		Sloat Boulevard – San Francisco Civic Center	Continuation beyond SR 1
1.000 mi = 1.609 km; 1.000 km = 0.621 mi: Concurrency terminus; Incomplete access
