= Picchetti Brothers Winery =

- Picchetti Winery
- U.S. National Register of Historic Places
- Location within San Jose, California Location within California Location within the United States
- Nearest city: Cupertino, California, US
- Coordinates: 37°17′45.45″N 122°5′16.32″W
- Built: 1880
- NRHP reference No.: 79000545
- Added to NRHP: May 10, 1979

The Picchetti Winery, also known as the Picchetti Ranch, is a winery located at 13100 Montebello Road in Cupertino, California in the Picchetti Ranch Open Space Preserve. The Picchetti brothers, Secondo and Vincenzo, for whom the ranch was named, were among the earliest settlers to plant grapes on this ridge, which they named "Monte Bello" or "beautiful mountain." This ridge was later to become one of Santa Clara County's important vineyard areas.

== History ==
The complex is composed of seven buildings built between 1880 and 1920, which retain their original design details. Vincenzo and Secondo Picchetti settled on Montebello ridge in 1877 and purchased an initial 160 acres (65 ha) for $1,500. The ranch expanded to 500 acres (200 ha) by 1904. The first house on the property was built around 1882, followed by a larger residence in 1886. Both homes, plus the stone winery, were in the Picchetti family until 1976.

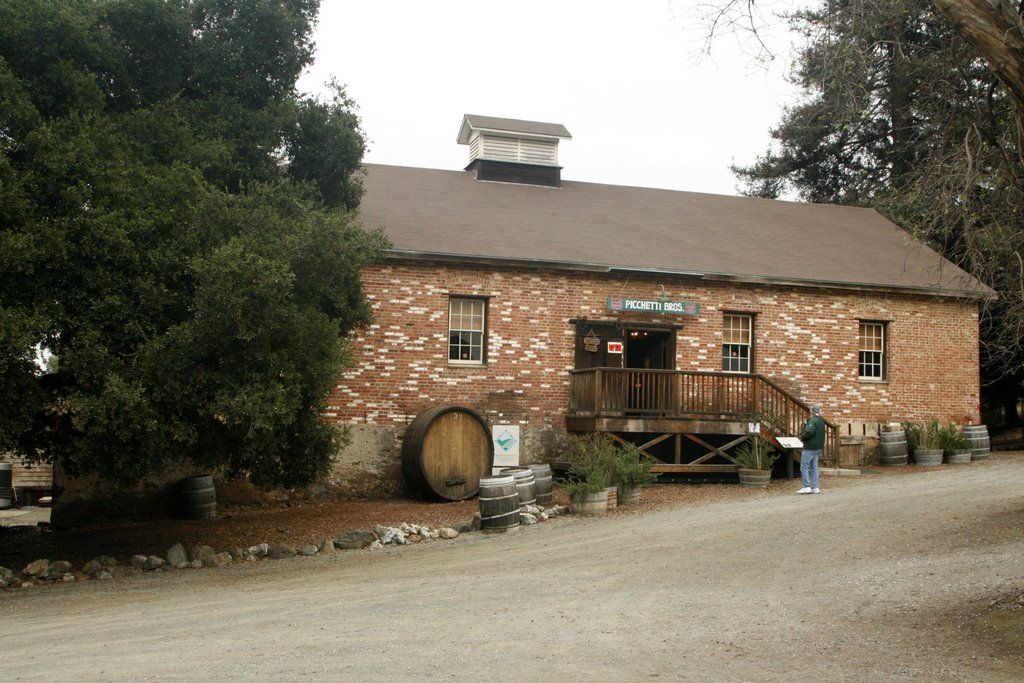

The first grapes planted were Zinfandel, Carignane and Petite Sirah. At first, the brothers only sold the grapes to local wineries, but in 1896 they decided to make their own wine, becoming one of the early wineries in California (California Bonded Winery number 148).

Instrumental in establishing the Montebello School in 1892, Vincenzo served on the first school board and supplied a room for a teacher at his ranch. Vineyards were the life blood of the town of Cupertino's early economy, although grape parasites destroyed many of the vines in the region in the 1890s.

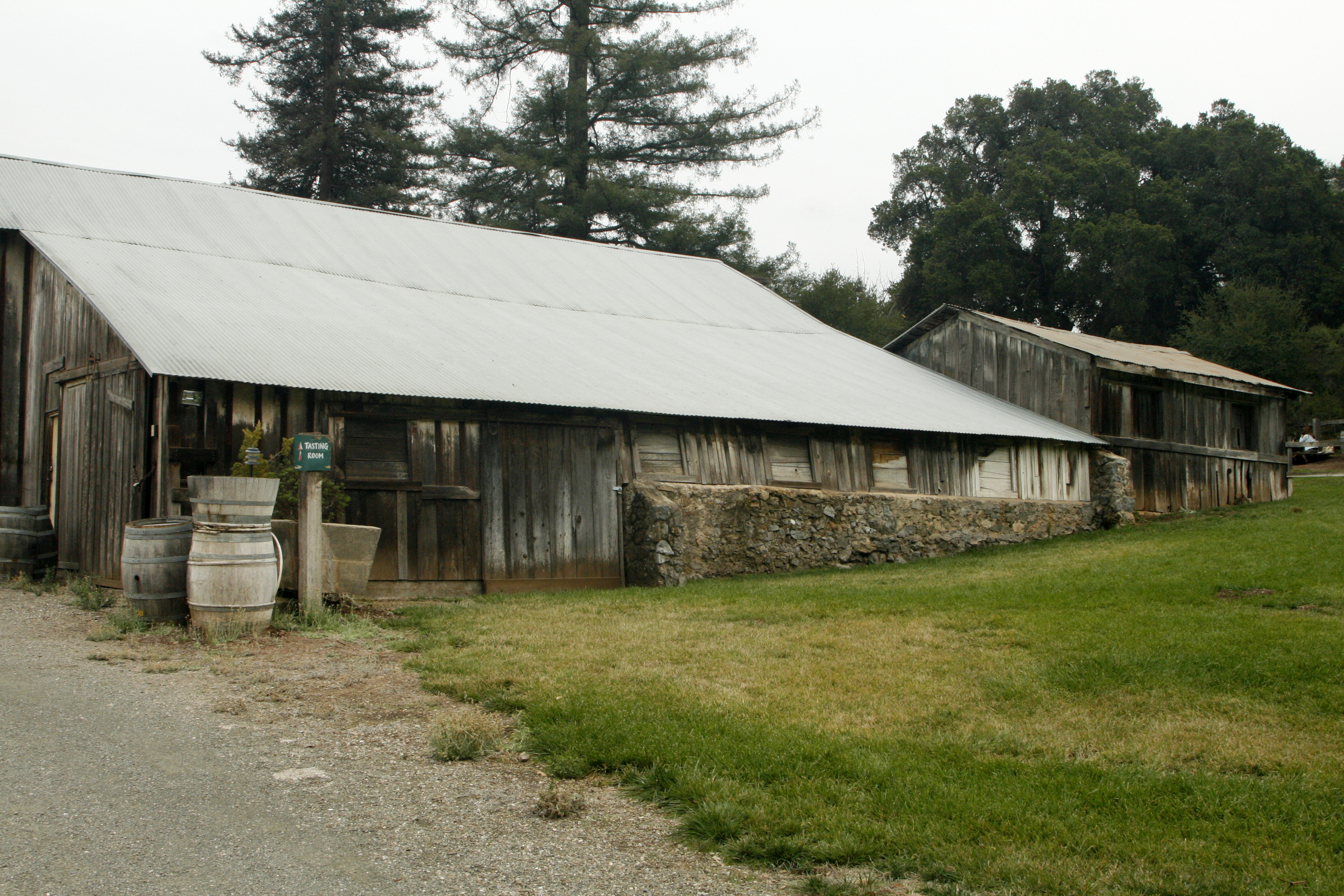
Tasting room and Historic outbuildings

Upon Vincenzo's death in 1904, sons Antone and John ran the winery and ranch. The front porch of the main house was once screened in and acted as an aviary. Later John had numerous aviaries built - one of those aviaries still stands in front of the homestead house.

Commercial wine production ceased in 1963 due to a lack of profitability, and much of the land was sold to the Midpeninsula Regional Open Space District. The Santa Clara County Historical Heritage Commission provided funding for the restoration of the winery building. The land produced wine from 1982 to 1998 as Sunrise Winery. The film Blood Red (1989), starring Dennis Hopper and young Julia Roberts was filmed at the winery.

In 1998, Leslie Pantling took over the winery and production has resumed to the tune of about 9,000 cases per year under the "Leslie's Estate" label.

Today, the Picchetti ranch and winery on Montebello Road remain as evidence of a thriving viticulture industry in early Cupertino.

== Picchetti Ranch Open Space Preserve ==
The 308 acres (125 ha) Picchetti Ranch Open Space Preserve was acquired by the Midpeninsula Regional Open Space District in 1976. The winery is leased back to a private party. The preserve is partially surrounded by Stevens Creek County Park, and features 3.7 miles (6.0 km) of trails restricted to pedestrians and horses.
