= Foothills Open Space Preserve =

Coordinates: 37.3548°N 122.1699°W

Foothills Open Space Preserve is a 212-acre open space preserve on Page Mill Road in Palo Alto, California. The land for the preserve was gifted to the Midpeninsula Regional Open Space District in 1974. The preserve's only trail is .4 miles and leads to a hilltop with views of the San Francisco Bay Area.
