= Windy Hill Open Space Preserve =

Regional park in San Mateo County, California, United States

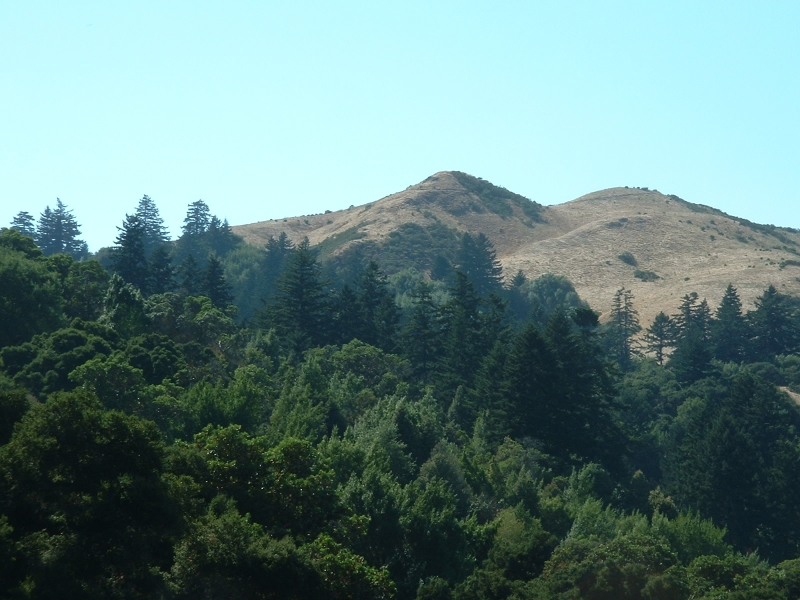
- Summit of Windy Hill from the Hamms Gulch Trail

- Location within California Location within the United States
- Location: San Mateo County, California, United States
- Nearest city: Portola Valley, California
- Coordinates: 37°21′45.55″N 122°13′28.00″W
- Area: 1,132 acres (4.58 km^{2})
- Established: 1979
- Governing body: Midpeninsula Regional Open Space District

Windy Hill Open Space Preserve is a regional park located in San Mateo County, California and operated by the Midpeninsula Regional Open Space District (MROSD). It is readily identifiable from the flatlands of the South Bay, as it is the only "naked" part of the peninsula range (not forested).

The Windy Hill Preserve comprises a 1132 acre (4.6 km^{2}) stretch of conservation land on the eastward side of the Peninsula Range (Santa Cruz Mountains), rising from the valley road near Portola Valley to the 1905 ft (581 m) summit from which it gets its name. Access to the summit is easy (0.5 mile moderate grade) from State Route 35, the ridge road along the Peninsula Range. Facilities focus on trails for hiking and mountain biking, with around 14 miles (22 km) of hiking trails. Paragliding and hang gliding are permitted with a special use permit, and are popular activities in the winter months when there are East winds. In clear weather you can see, from the summit, the entire upper end of the park, across the campus of Stanford University to the San Francisco Bay and beyond to Mount Tamalpais and Mount Diablo. Downtown San Francisco is visible, as well as the Pacific Ocean.

The majority of Windy Hill is buffeted from the prevailing winds and weather, which generally comes in off of the Pacific Ocean, such that pleasant conditions at lower elevations may well be much cooler, more windy, or with foggy or rainy conditions nearer to and at the summit.

The area is rich in wildlife; among the species likely to be seen are California mule deer, coyote, California vole, white-tailed kite, American kestrel, band-tailed pigeon and California quail. There are signs warning about mountain lions, but bobcats are more common. Rattlesnakes and gopher snakes may also be found. Banana slugs and, in season, California newts are common.

Spring Ridge Trail runs from the Portola Valley trailhead to Skyline Boulevard through the open, grassy part of the preserve. It, like most of the lower trails, is a fire road, open to cyclists as well as hikers and equestrians. Two trails further to the south (Hamms Gulch and the Lost Trail-Razorback Ridge-Eagle Trail combination), are single-tracks not open to cyclists. These trails run through forested country: oak, fir, buckeye, bay laurel, madrone and one or two redwoods.

Because the far shore rises so steeply, Sausal Pond appears to be black or murky green, rather than sky-blue. This marshy pond is home to a few coots and the occasional mallard, to dragonflies and bullfrogs. Shoreline access is limited to not more than one or two hundred feet, much of that surrounded by bush and accessible only to the determined.

== Picture gallery ==
Looking toward the Pacific coast from the peak of Windy Hill

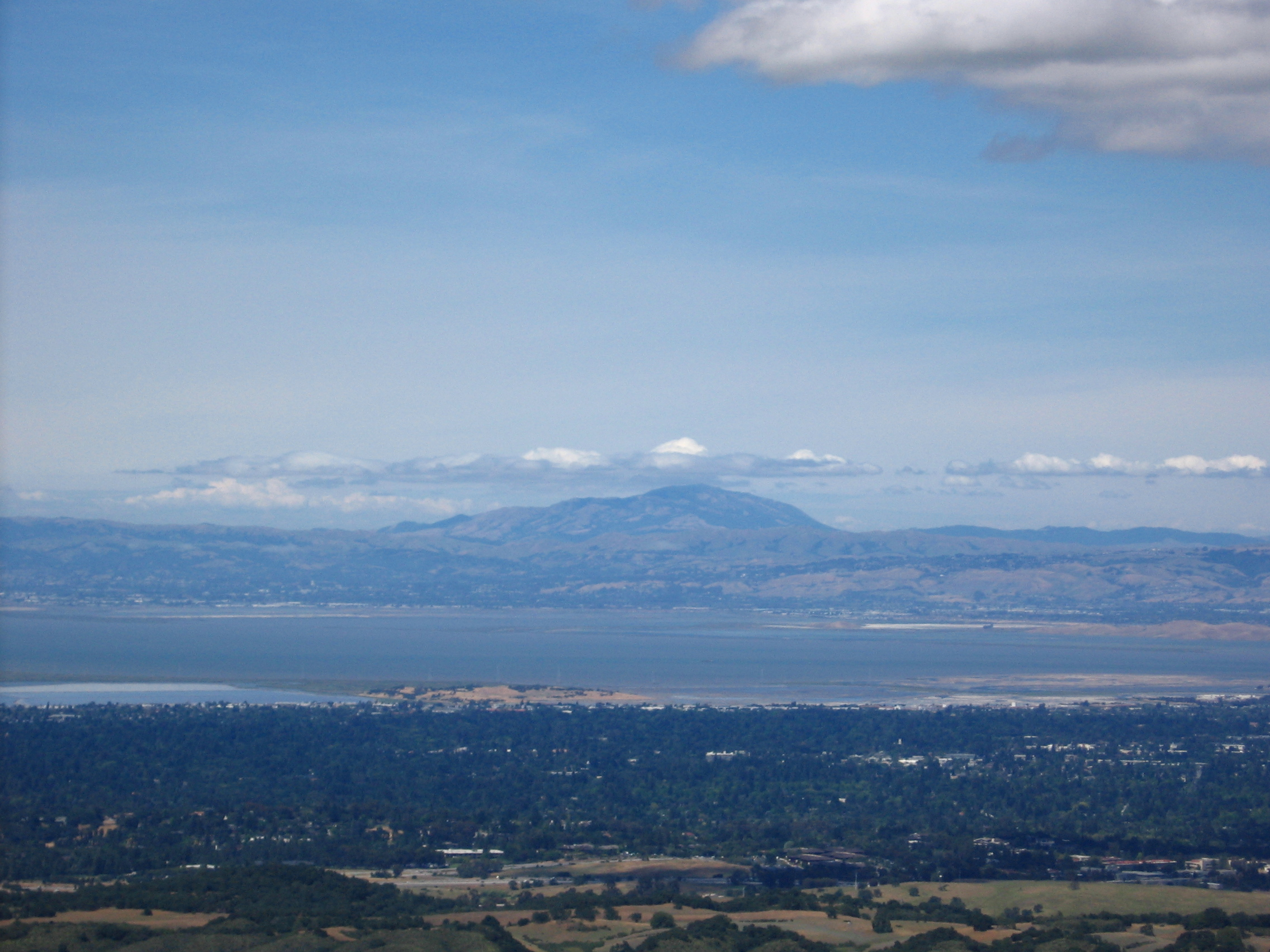
View of the bay and Mount Diablo from Windy Hill

A view of the Bay Area from Windy Hill. Mount Diablo is visible in the distance.
