= Midpeninsula Regional Open Space District =

Special district in San Francisco

Coordinates: 37.39641°N 122.105922°W

The Midpeninsula Regional Open Space District (Midpen) is an independent special district in the San Francisco Bay Area. Formed in 1972 by voter initiative Measure R, it has acquired, preserved and restored a regional green belt of open space land and provides opportunities for ecologically-sensitive public enjoyment and education.

The district, which includes parts of Santa Clara, San Mateo and Santa Cruz counties, works to form a continuous green belt of permanently preserved open space by linking its lands with other public park lands. A member of the Bay Area Open Space Council, the district also participates in cooperative efforts such as the San Francisco Bay Trail, Bay Area Ridge Trail, and Skyline-to-the-Sea Trail, which are regional trail systems in the Bay Area that include district lands.

The Midpeninsula Regional Open Space District has permanently preserved more than 70,000 acres (28,000 ha) of foothills, baylands, redwood forests, coastal grasslands, oak savannah and other open space across 26 open space preserves. Of the district's 26 preserves, 24 are open to the public free of charge, 365 days a year from dawn until one-half hour after sunset.

The district's tax and voter base consists of about 550 square miles (1,400 km^{2}) and 763,000 people, mostly in Santa Clara and San Mateo counties. District revenues for fiscal year 2025-2026 were projected to be $94.4 million, with $82 million coming directly from a portion of property taxes. The district also occasionally receives state and federal grants, as well as private donations and rental income.

The District's stated mission is:

To acquire and preserve a regional greenbelt of open space land in perpetuity; protect and restore the natural environment; and provide opportunities for ecologically sensitive public enjoyment and education.

On the Coast, Midpen has an expanded mission:

To acquire and preserve in perpetuity open space and agricultural land of regional significance, protect and restore the natural environment, preserve rural character, encourage viable agricultural use of land resources, and provide opportunities for ecologically sensitive public enjoyment and education.

== Recreation ==
Most of the preserves are open to recreation. Popular activities are hiking, cycling, and horseback riding. Paragliding and hang gliding are permitted at Windy Hill Open Space Preserve with a special use permit. Camping is generally prohibited, though the Monte Bello Open Space Preserve does have a backpacking camp available by permit only. Of the 26 preserves, 24 are fully open to the public: Miramontes Ridge Open Space Preserve and Tunitas Creek Open Space Preserve are not open.

In total, as of 2025, the district has 259 mi (417 km) of hiking trails, of which 163 mi (262 km) are open to bicycles, 223 mi (359 km) to equestrians, and 63 mi (101 km) to leashed dogs. Another 5.3 mi (8.5 km) of trail require a permit to access. Preserves are relatively undeveloped, with most having only a parking area, trail signs, and possibly an outhouse. All preserves are open from dawn to one-half hour after sunset.

Park rangers patrol the district and provide a range of services. Ranger staff are sworn peace officers but do not carry firearms. They wear tan and green uniforms; the badge is a gold metal seven-point star with an enameled California state seal in the center. Dispatch services are provided by the Mountain View Police Department under contract.

== Open space preserves ==
The following open space preserves are managed by Midpen:

Midpeninsula Regional Open Space Preserves
Name	Acquired	Area	Trails	Notes	Access	Refs.
Bear Creek Redwoods	1999	1,440 acres (580 ha)	6 mi (9.7 km)		3 mi (4.8 km) S of Los Gatos; SR 17 to Bear Creek Road	
Cloverdale Ranch	2023	?	1 mi (1.6 km)		SR 1, near Pigeon Point Lighthouse	
Coal Creek	?	500 acres (200 ha)	3.7 mi (6.0 km)		Skyline Blvd, approximately 1.2 mi (1.9 km) north of Page Mill Rd and 6 mi (9.7 km) south of SR 84	
El Corte de Madera Creek	1988	2,908 acres (1,177 ha)	34.8 mi (56.0 km)	see also El Corte de Madera Creek (waterway)	parking lots off Skyline Blvd, approximately 2.7 and 4 mi (4.3 and 6.4 km) north of SR 84	
El Sereno	1975	1,614 acres (653 ha)	6.9 mi (11.1 km)	Named for 2,500 ft (760 m) Mount El Sereno	3 mi (4.8 km) west of SR 17 at Bear Creek Road / Montevina Road exit	
Foothills	1972	212 acres (86 ha)	0.3 mi (0.48 km)		Page Mill Road, 3.5 mi (5.6 km) southwest of I-280	
Fremont Older	1975	739 acres (299 ha)	14.7 mi (23.7 km)	named for Fremont Older	exit SR 85 at De Anza, then take Prospect Road to parking space	
La Honda Creek	Nov 2017	approximately 6,500 acres (2,600 ha)	10.6 mi (17.1 km)	divided into Upper and Lower areas; Upper La Honda Creek requires no-fee permit	(Lower) via Sears Ranch Road, off SR 84	
Long Ridge	1985	?	14.1 mi (22.7 km)	southern edge borders Skyline-to-the-Sea Trail	parking lots west of Skyline Blvd, approximately 3.6 mi (5.8 km) north of SR 9 and 3.3 mi (5.3 km) south of Page Mill Road	
Los Trancos	1976	274 acres (111 ha)	6 mi (9.7 km)		Page Mill Road, 7 mi (11 km) west of I-280 and 1.5 mi (2.4 km) east of Skyline Blvd	
Miramontes Ridge	?	?	?	closed to public; adjacent to Burleigh H. Murray Ranch; 644 acres (261 ha) Johnston Ranch parcel added in 2024	—N/a	
Monte Bello	?	3,436 acres (1,390 ha)	15.5 mi (24.9 km)		Page Mill Road, 7 mi (11 km) W of I-280 and 1.5 mi (2.4 km) E of Skyline, adjacent to Los Trancos.	
Picchetti Ranch	1976	308 acres (125 ha)	3.7 mi (6.0 km)	Picchetti Winery operates on the edge of the preserve	From I-280, take Foothill Expy exit and travel 3.5 mi (5.6 km) southwest to Montebello Rd, continue 0.5 mi (0.80 km) on Montebello to preserve.	
Pulgas Ridge	?	?	6.2 mi (10.0 km)			
Purisima Creek	?	?	22.8 mi (36.7 km)			
Rancho San Antonio	?	?	26 mi (42 km)			
Ravenswood	1981	376 acres (152 ha)	2.1 mi (3.4 km)	Opened to public in 1989		
Russian Ridge	?	3,491 acres (1,413 ha)	13.1 mi (21.1 km)	Contains highest named point in San Mateo County: Borel Hill, 2,572 ft (784 m)		
St. Joseph's Hill	?	273 acres (110 ha)	4.2 mi (6.8 km)			
Saratoga Gap	?	1,600 acres (650 ha)	1.4 mi (2.3 km)			
Sierra Azul	?	19,000 acres (7,700 ha)	25.8 mi (41.5 km)			
Skyline Ridge	?	2,144 acres (868 ha)	12.4 mi (20.0 km)			
Stevens Creek Shoreline Nature Area	?	?	0.7 mi (1.1 km)			
Teague Hill	?	?	0.2 mi (0.32 km)			
Thornewood	?	167 acres (68 ha)	1.5 mi (2.4 km)			
Tunitas Creek	?	?	?			
Windy Hill	?	1,414 acres (572 ha)	13.6 mi (21.9 km)			

== Gallery ==
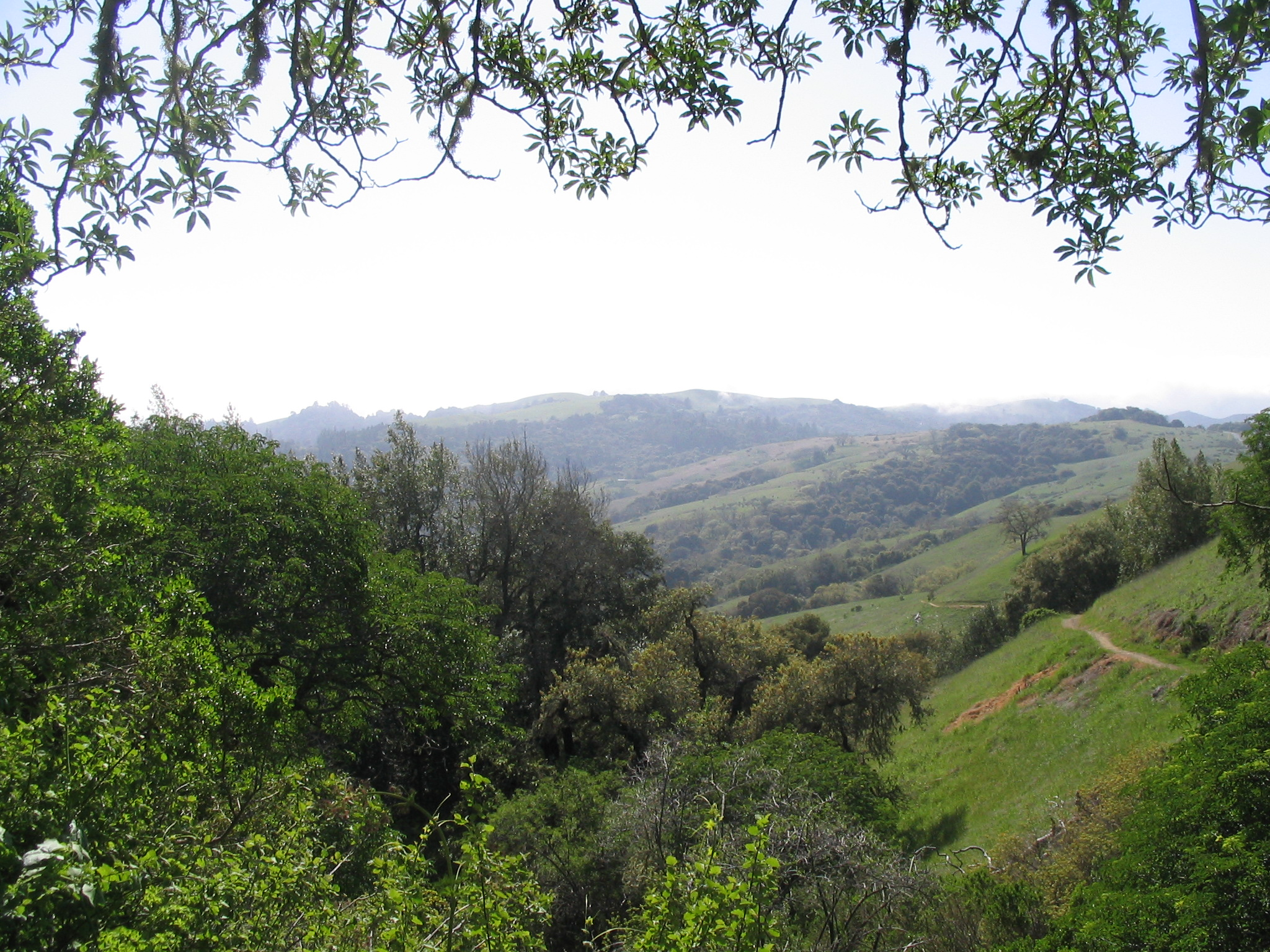
Monte Bello Open Space Preserve

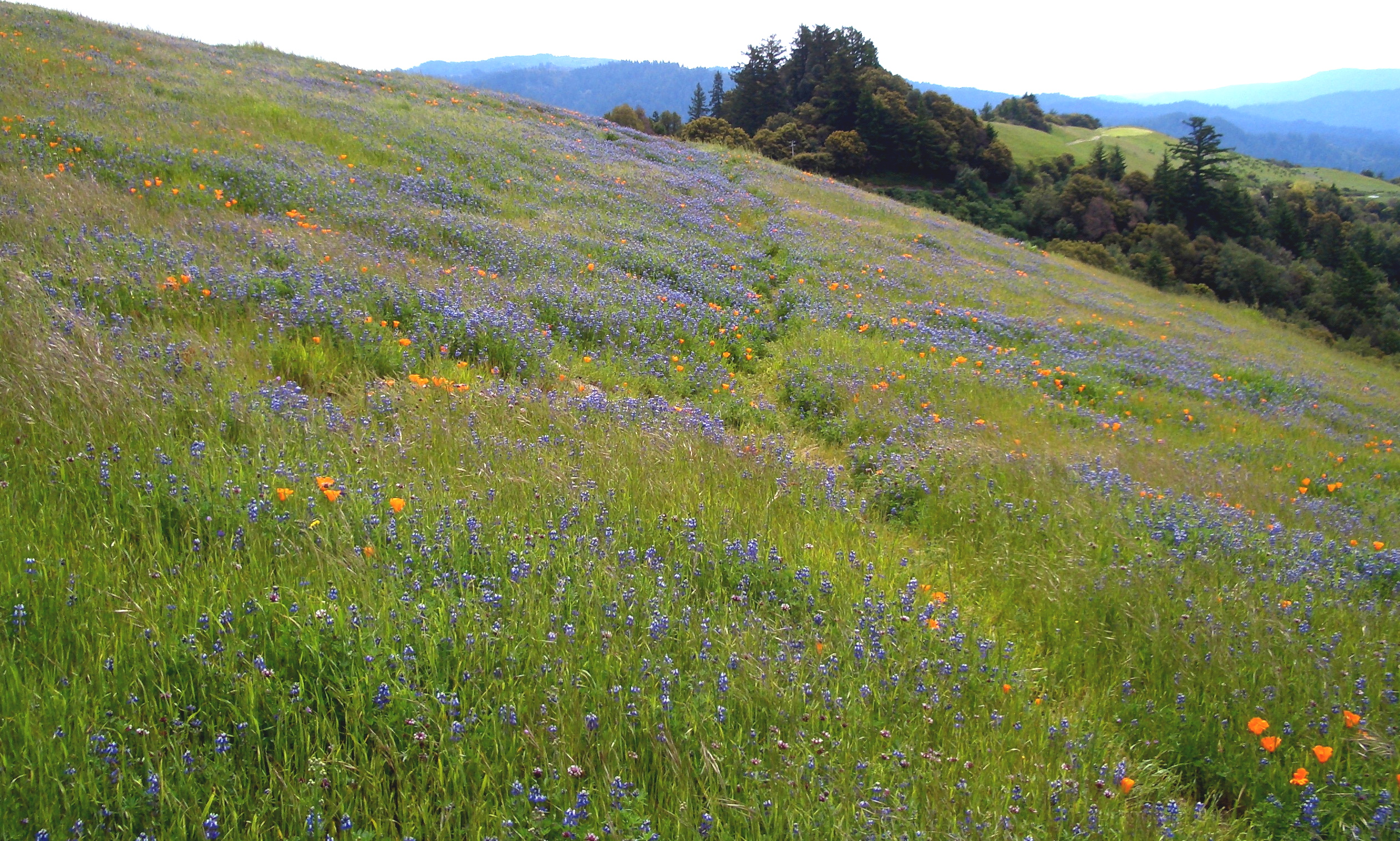
Russian Ridge Open Space Preserve

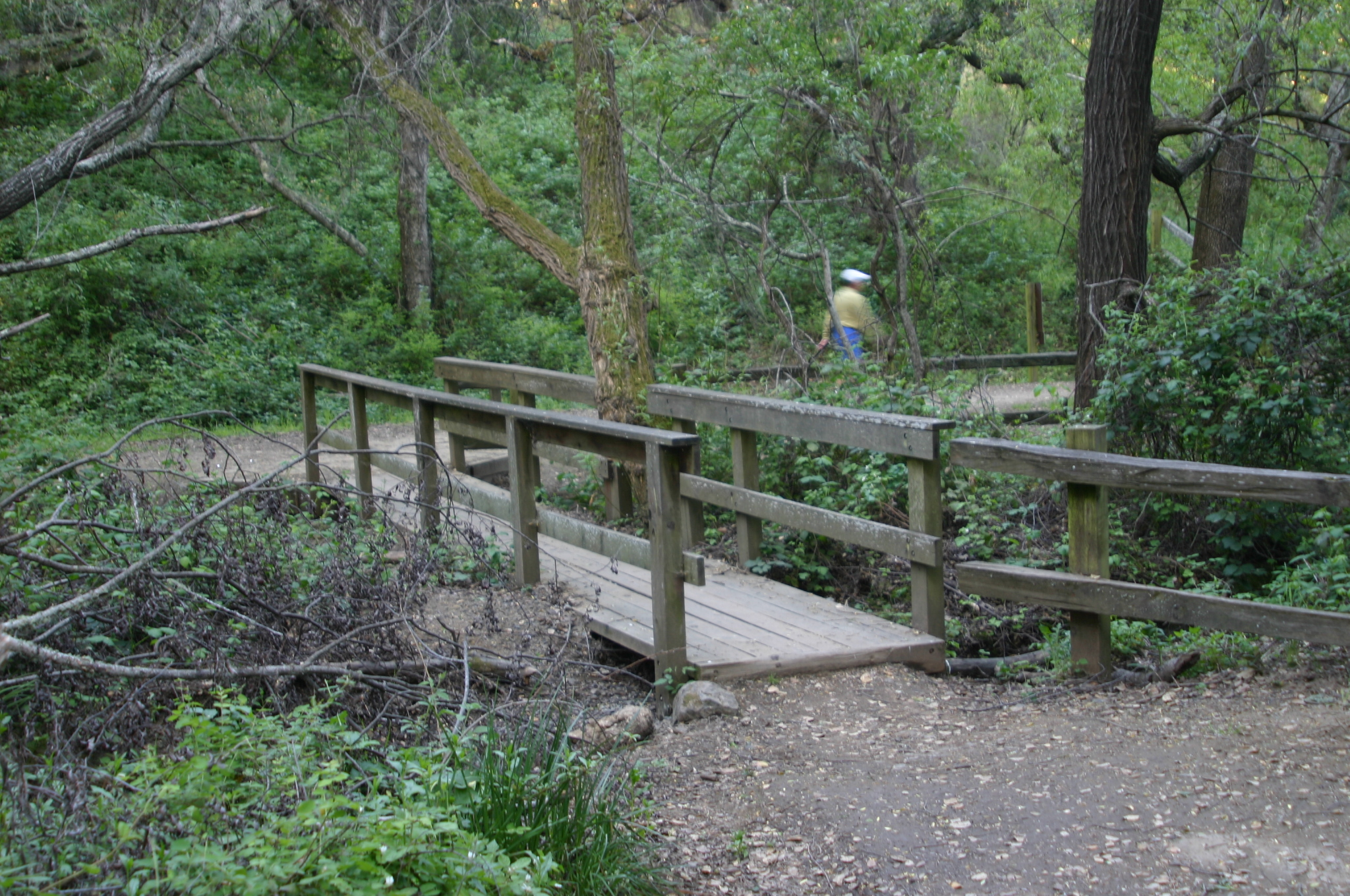
Pulgas Ridge Open Space Preserve

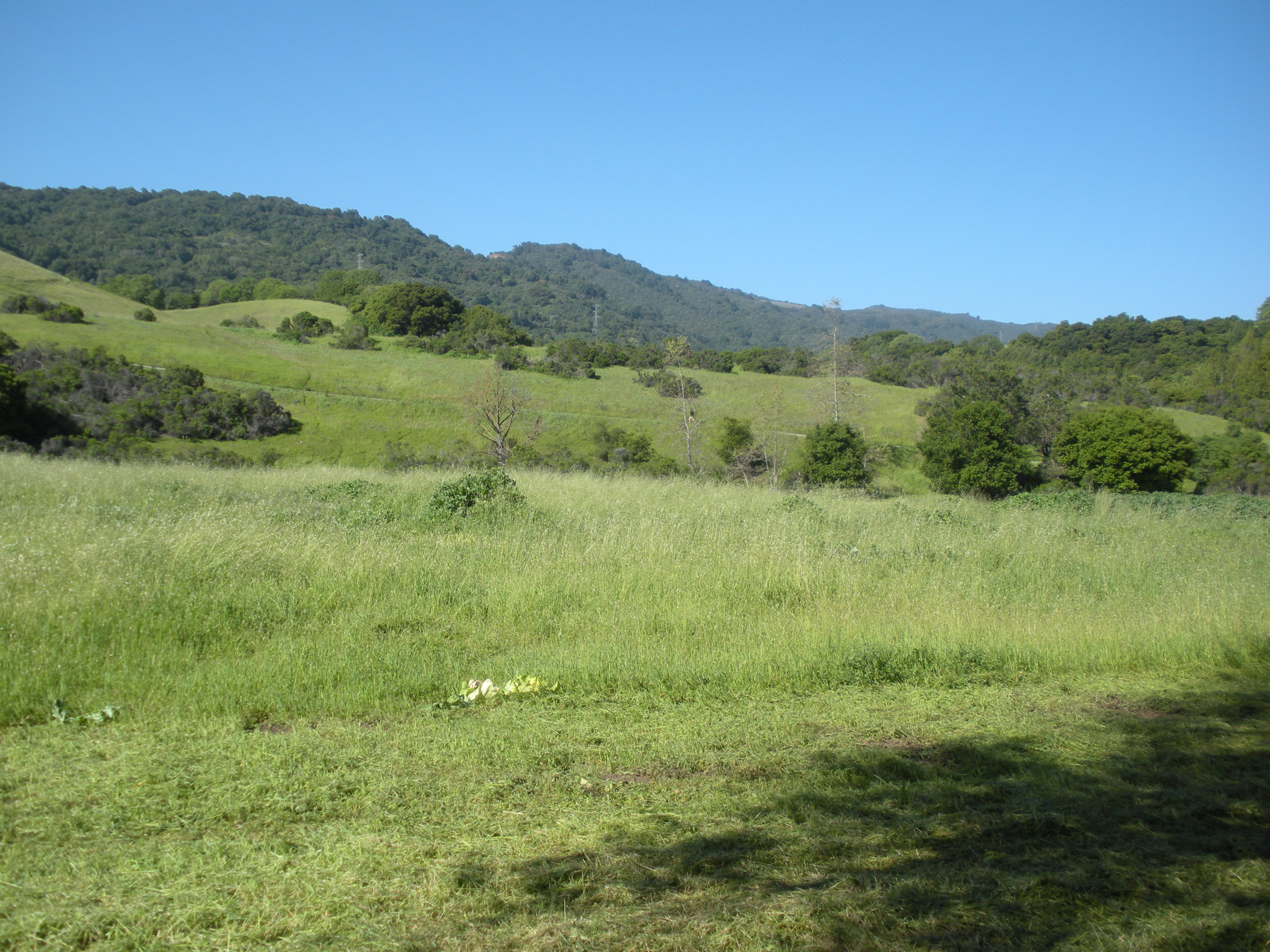
Rancho San Antonio County Park and Open Space Preserve
