= El Corte de Madera Creek Open Space Preserve =

Protected area in San Mateo County, California

Coordinates: 37.411883°N 122.308851°W

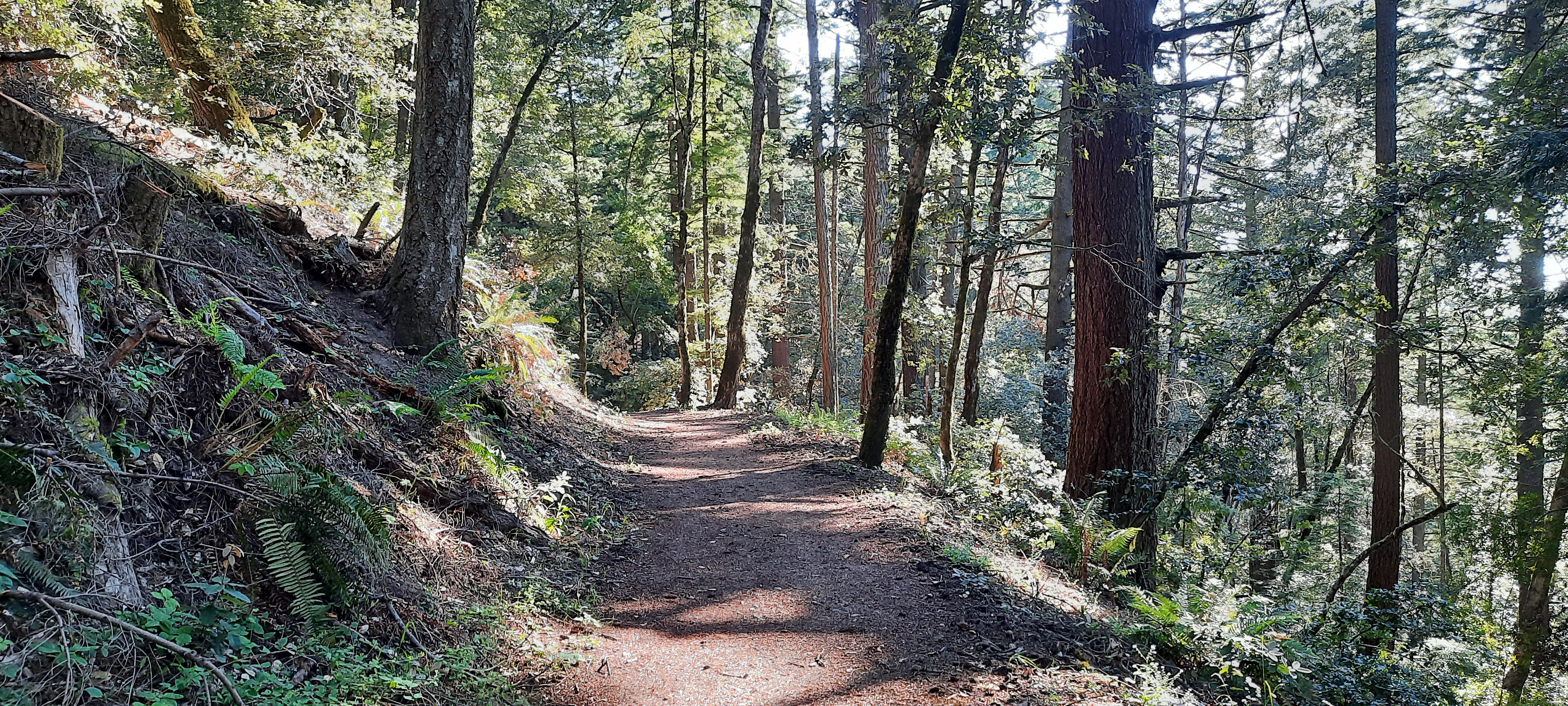
A view of the Tafoni Trail in El Corte de Madera Open Space Preserve

El Corte de Madera Open Space Preserve, known to locals as Skeggs (after Skeggs Point), is a 2,908-acre (1,177 ha) open space preserve in San Mateo County, California.

== Recreation ==
The preserve contains over 34 miles of trails for bicycles, horses, and hiking. The preserve is popular for mountain biking.

A portion of the Bay Area Ridge Trail runs through the park.

== History ==
Starting in the 1860s, the area was logged. Eight mills were operated in the area. Modern logging continued on and off until 1988.

In 1953, BCPA Flight 304 crashed in what is now the preserve, killing all on board. An historical marker in the park commemorates the site.

Prior to its acquisition by the Mid-peninsula Regional Open Space District (MROSD), the area was also used by a local motorcycle club (PITS); who built an extensive network of trails in addition to the old logging trails.

In the mid-90s, MROSD began taking a more active role in the management of trails in the preserve; closing several trails, and realigning or adjusting many others. Local mountain bikers from the organization ROMP (Responsible Organized Mountain Pedalers - one of the original organizations which together formed IMBA. ROMP also grew into today's (2025) Silicon Valley Mountain Bikers) advocated for the preservation of certain trail features which made them so interesting for mountain bikers. These advocacy efforts resulted in mountain bikers building the new "Leaf Extension" trail, and the original "Leaf" trail being preserved at the original 3ft width.
