= Bay Area Open Space Council =

The Bay Area Open Space Council was a network of 65 nonprofits and public agencies San Francisco Bay Area founded in 1990 by a group of land conservation practitioners to provide information, tools, and connections for its members. Though the Open Space Council's office was located in Berkeley, California, member organizations represented all nine counties of the San Francisco Bay Area plus Santa Cruz County.

In March 2020, a group of member organizations of the Open Space Council launched Together Bay Area to replace the former organization.

== Programs ==
=== Conservation Lands Network ===
One of the Open Space Council's projects was the Conservation Lands Network, a vision for the region's efforts to preserve biodiversity. Part of a five-year science-based study by over 125 organizations and individuals, the project was tasked to identify the most essential lands needed to sustain the natural infrastructure of the region. The Conservation Land Network studied over 4.3 million acres (17,000 km^{2}) and over 1,000 variables, such as redwood forests and California red legged frog habitats. Along with the Subtidal Habitat Goals Project and the Baylands Ecosystem Goals Project, this project is part of a science-based, regional approach to protecting biodiversity of the Bay Area.

=== Protected Areas Database ===
The Council collaborated with Greeninfo Network to develop a GIS database of protected areas in the nine county San Francisco Bay Area called the Bay Area Protected Lands Database (BPAD). In 2010, Santa Cruz County was included for the first time, adding a tenth county to the nine Bay Area counties.

=== Native American Partnerships ===
The film Here and Now, produced by the Open Space Council with help from the Christensen Fund, Midpeninsula Regional Open Space District, and The Trust for Public Land, is a short film that combines social justice, land conservation, human history, and scientific knowledge to tell the story of four partnerships between Native Americans and land conservation organizations.

=== Outdoor Voice ===
The Open Space Council is building a constituency for land conservation by engaging Bay Area park users in ways to get involved. The program Outdoor Voice is regional throughout all ten Bay Area counties, focusing on action, targeting Bay Area park users, and leveraging social media.
