= Russian Ridge Open Space Preserve =

Californian park

- IUCN category V (protected landscape/seascape)
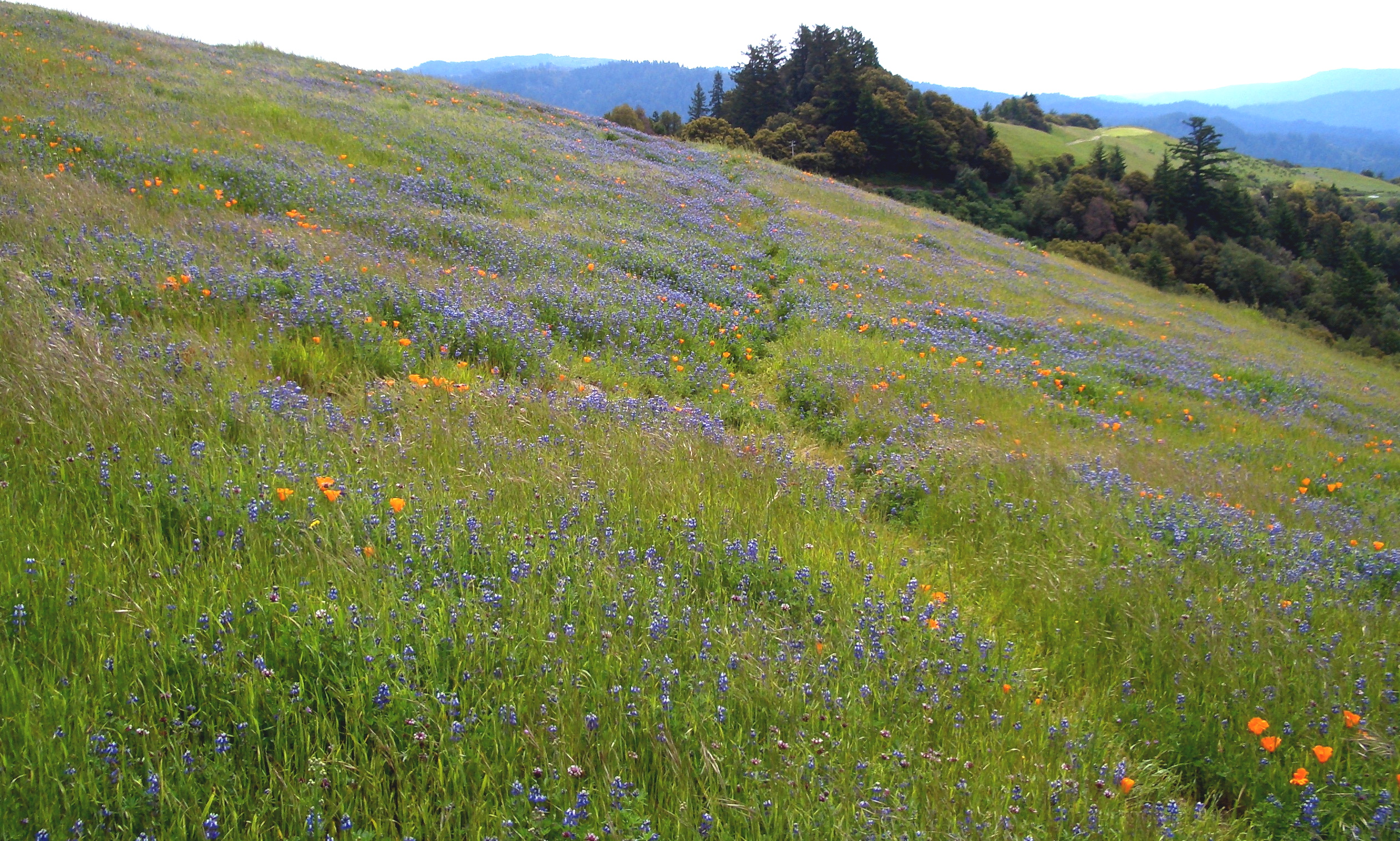
- A flowering meadow dotted with poppies and lupine in spring, Russian Ridge, Silicon Valley, CA, USA

- Location within California Location within the United States
- Location: San Mateo County, California, USA
- Nearest city: Redwood City, California
- Coordinates: 37°18′47″N 122°12′53″W
- Area: 3,137 acres (12.69 km^{2})
- Established: 1978
- Governing body: Midpeninsula Regional Open Space District

Russian Ridge Open Space Preserve is a regional park located in the Santa Cruz Mountains in San Mateo County, California along the San Francisco Peninsula. Its 3,137 acres (1,269 ha) and 10.4 miles (16.7 km) of trails are managed by the Midpeninsula Regional Open Space District.

== Description ==
The preserve consists of both dense forest and open meadows, and common activities in the preserve consist of hiking, mountain biking, and horseback riding. Its highest point is Borel Hill (2,572 feet or 784 metres) with views extending east across the San Francisco Bay from San Jose to San Francisco, and west to the Pacific Ocean.

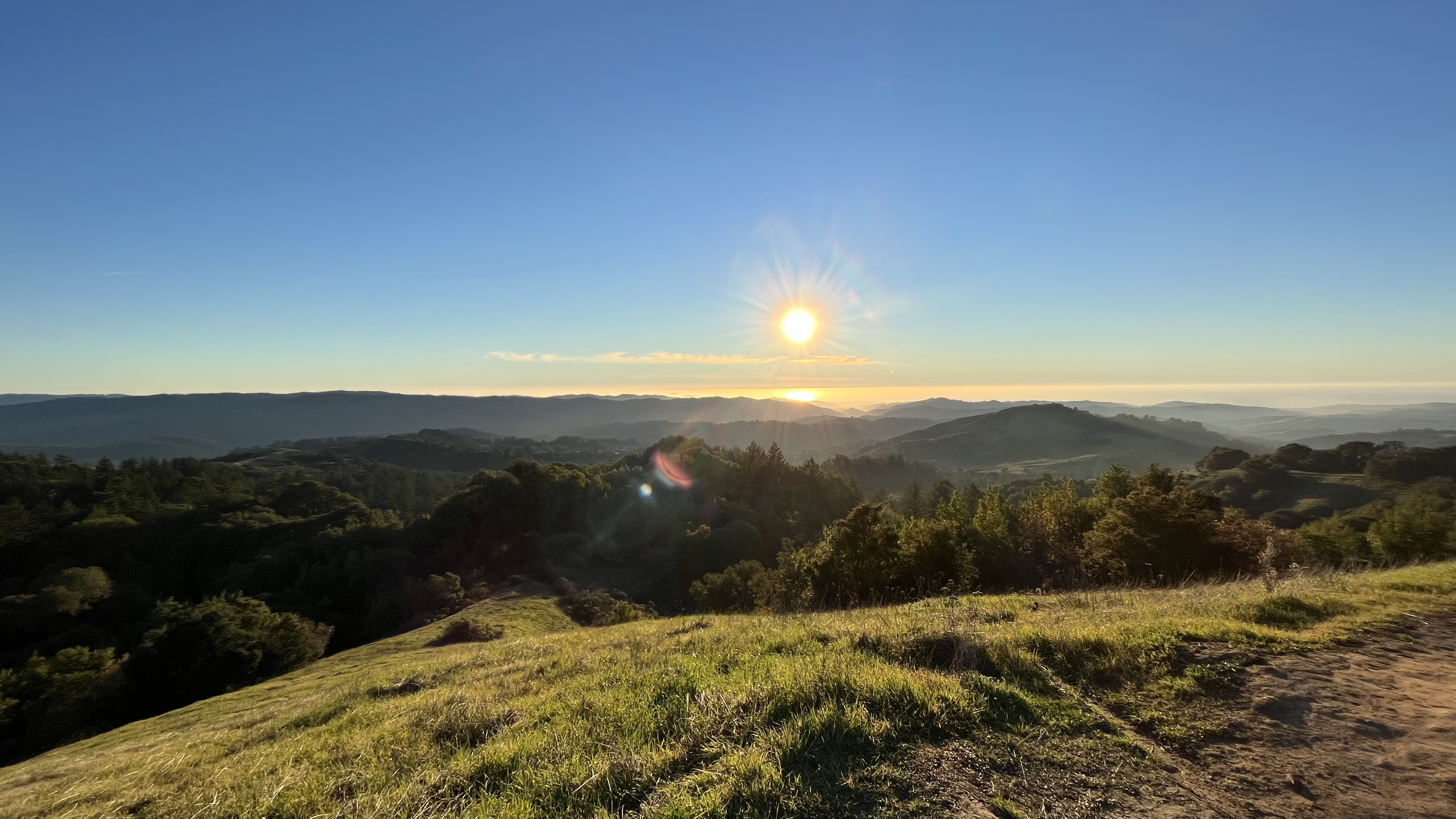
Looking west from the Ancient Oaks Trail in the park

== Flora ==
Poppies and lupines are the primary flowers that dominate the green, lush rolling meadows in the spring to early summer, but in the late summer the hills turn gold and are covered with flowers such as the cluster-lily, gumweed, mule's ear, and farewell to spring. In shaded areas, one can expect to see thimbleberry and a variety of ferns growing.

== Fauna ==
Several animals can be found on the preserve including coyote, bobcat, bats, California newts and birds such as the American kestrel and northern harrier.

== History ==
Russian Ridge is named after a Russian immigrant, Mr. Paskey, who leased a dairy farm here from the 1920s to 1950 from James "Sunny Jim" Rolph, Jr., then mayor of San Francisco and later California's 27th governor.

The district acquired the land starting in 1978 from later owners who had plans to develop it into subdivisions.

== Access ==
Parking for the preserve can be found in two parking lots — one lot as roadside parking on the northbound direction of Skyline Boulevard, the other, the Audrey C. Rust Commemorative Site, named after the former president of the Peninsula Open Space Trust, is located just off Alpine Road near the Alpine Road and Skyline Boulevard intersection.

It can also be accessed through neighboring preserves, such as the Skyline Ridge Open Space Preserve through the southeast end of the Ridge Trail (part of the Bay Area Ridge Trail system), as well as the Coal Creek Open Space Preserve, by crossing Skyline Boulevard from Coal Creek's Clouds Rest Trail to Russian Ridge's Ridge Trail.
