= Bay Area Ridge Trail =

Trail circling the San Francisco Bay Area

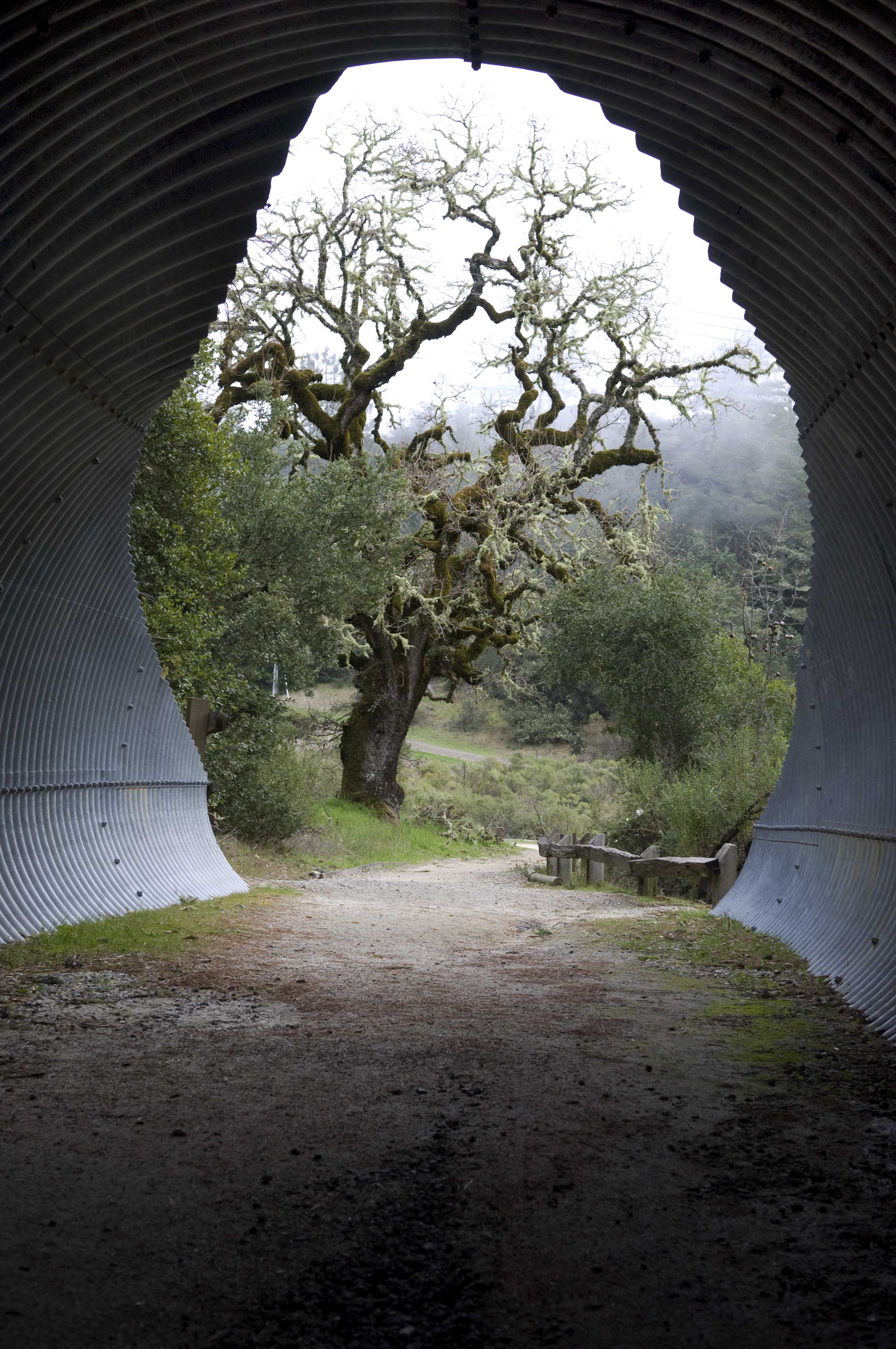
- Tunnel to Alpine Pond at Russian Ridge Open Space Preserve
- Length: 550 mi (890 km)
- Location: San Francisco Bay Area, California, United States
- Use: Hiking, bicycling, horseback riding, birdwatching, environmental education
- Waymark: Yes
- Website: ridgetrail.org

The Bay Area Ridge Trail (shortened as Ridge Trail) is a multi-use trail along the hill and mountain ridgelines surrounding the San Francisco Bay Area, in Northern California. It is planned to extend 550 miles (890 km); As of May 2025, 427 miles (687 km) have been established. When complete, the trail will connect over seventy-five parks and open spaces. The trail is being developed to provide access for hikers, runners, mountain bicyclists, and equestrians. It is intended to be accessible through trailheads near major population centers, but the trail extends into more remote areas. The first trail section was dedicated on May 13, 1989.

== History ==
William Penn Mott Jr., the twelfth director of the National Park Service, gave a speech in March 1987 at a state parks and recreation conference and discussed plans for the Ridge Trail. While working for the East Bay Regional Park District in the 1960s, Mott's office was on a ridgeline in the East Bay, and the views from the office inspired his vision of a hill-and-ridge trail encircling the Bay and linking its communities. The plan would later attract bipartisan support, with George Miller joining Mott.

In May 1987, the Greenbelt Alliance held a meeting to strategize how to approach the San Francisco Water Department and convince them to open their watershed lands to the public; Mark Evanoff convened the meeting and Brian O'Neill, Superintendent of the Golden Gate National Recreation Area, proposed a potential strategy to pursue the goals outlined in the report by the President's Commission on Americans Outdoors. Later that year, a planning committee was formed with memberships from nearly forty public agencies, recreation groups, and individuals. Eventually, this committee became the Bay Area Ridge Trail Council.

Dinesh Desai, a retired engineer, and Bob Cowell, a retired fire chief, completed the first hike of the Ridge Trail in 1999. The pair followed designated and non-designated trails, including a crossing of the Carquinez Strait by kayak.

=== Trail development ===
The first two segments of the trail, dedicated on May 13, 1989, were located in San Mateo County and managed by the Midpeninsula Regional Open Space District and the San Mateo County Department of Parks. Marin County and San Francisco City and County opened their first segments in September 1989; Napa, Solano, and Santa Clara counties in October 1989; Contra Costa and Alameda counties in June 1990; and Sonoma County in October 1990. Existing trails in public spaces were incorporated into the Ridge Trail, extending the trail to 100 miles (160 km) by 1990 and 200 miles (320 km) by 1995.

By 1999, 217 miles (349 km) of the Ridge Trail had been completed, mostly on public lands. 10 miles (16 km) of the Ridge Trail were added in 2005, including a new bridge over San Geronimo Creek; at that point, the Ridge Trail ran for 285 miles (459 km). The section of Ridge Trail through Crockett Hills Regional Park in Contra Costa County, which opened in June 2006, pushed the trail past the 300-mile (480 km) mark.

As of 2020, the Ridge Trail stood at 383 miles (616 km) completed. The section of the trail that runs through San Francisco has been completed, and parts of the San Francisco trail have been rerouted to pass through more green space and over the Twin Peaks. Large sections of the trail running through San Mateo, Marin, Contra Costa, and Alameda counties have been completed. Much of the remaining mileage is on private property in Santa Clara, Sonoma, and Napa.

== Route ==
Trail marker for Bay Area Ridge Trail

Starting at the Golden Gate Bridge and proceeding clockwise, the route goes through every Bay Area county: Marin, Sonoma, Napa, Solano, Contra Costa, Alameda, Santa Clara, Santa Cruz, San Mateo, and San Francisco. The planned alignment of the Ridge Trail extends as far north as Calistoga and Angwin, and as far south as Gilroy.

=== San Francisco City and County ===
From south to north, the trail passes through the following landmarks: Lake Merced, Stern Grove, Twin Peaks, Buena Vista Park, the panhandle of Golden Gate Park, and the Presidio.

Ridge Trail segment status (as of 2015)
County	Completed length of segments	Final planned length of segments
Marin	62 miles (100 kilometres)	72 miles (116 kilometres)
Sonoma	29 miles (47 kilometres)	50 miles (80 kilometres)
Napa	18 miles (29 kilometres)	80 miles (130 kilometres)
Solano	30 miles (48 kilometres)	50 miles (80 kilometres)
Contra Costa	43 miles (69 kilometres)	49 miles (79 kilometres)
Alameda	36 miles (58 kilometres)	56 miles (90 kilometres)
Santa Clara	83 miles (134 kilometres)	190 miles (310 kilometres)
San Mateo	44 miles (71 kilometres)	65 miles (105 kilometres)
San Francisco	15 miles (24 kilometres)	20 miles (32 kilometres)
Santa Cruz	1 mile (1.6 kilometers)	1 mile (1.6 kilometers)

== Bay Area Ridge Trail Council ==
The Bay Area Ridge Trail Council (BARTC), founded in 1987, is the organization building, maintaining, and promoting the Ridge Trail. BARTC initially was supported by the Greenbelt Alliance, but it was incorporated in 1991 as a 501(c)(3) nonprofit under co-chairs Brian O'Neill and Marcia McNally. The Council office is located in Berkeley.

== See also ==
- San Francisco Bay Trail
