= Brian O'Neill (superintendent) =

Golden Gate National Recreation Area Superintendent

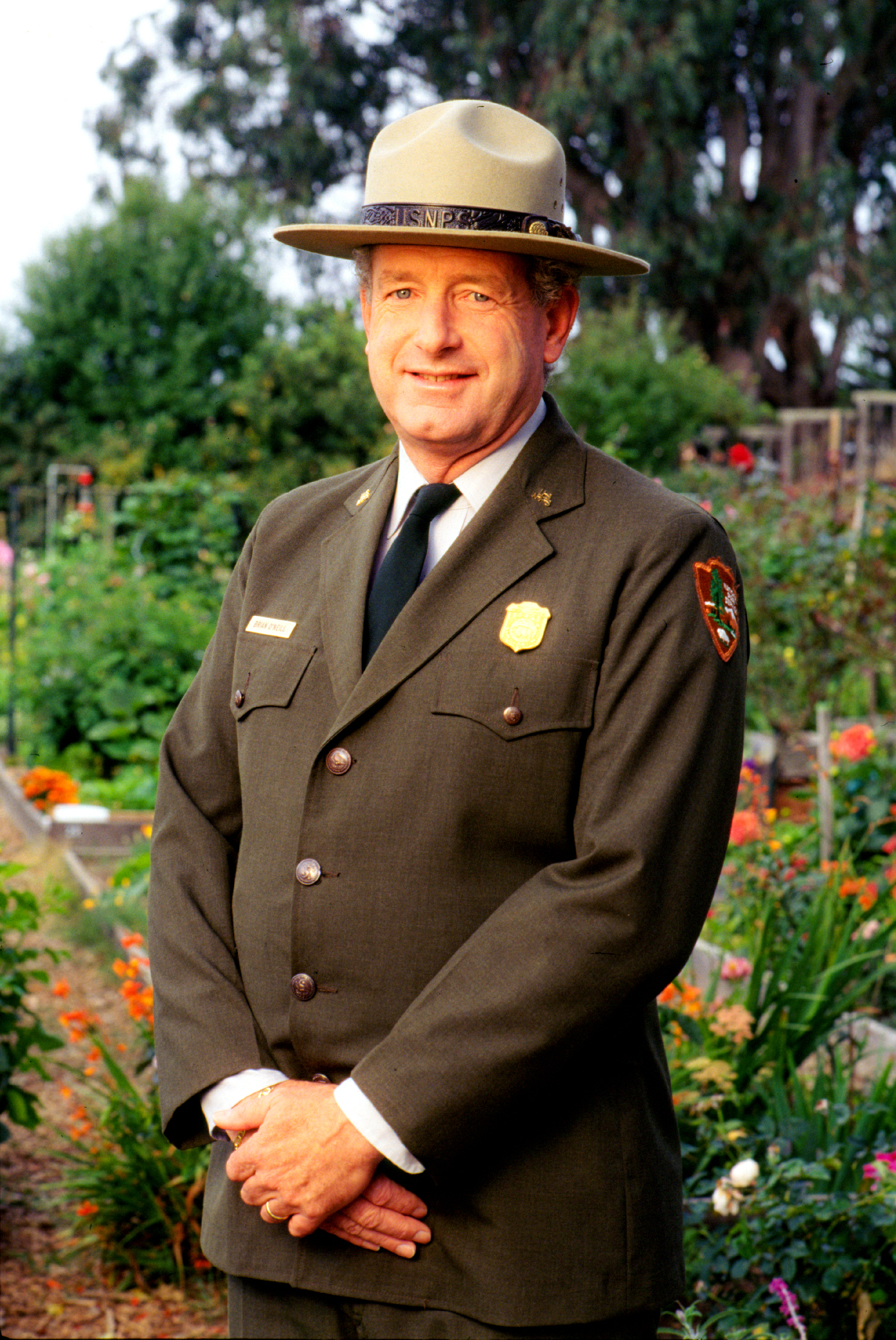
- Brian O'Neill
- Born: September 17, 1941^{[a]} Washington, D.C., United States
- Died: May 13, 2009 (aged 67); San Francisco, California, United States
- Known for: Superintendent of the Golden Gate National Recreation Area for twenty-three years

Brian O'Neill (September 17, 1941 – May 13, 2009)^{[a]} was the superintendent of the Golden Gate National Recreation Area from 1986 until his death in 2009. He has been described as the most important of the superintendents of the Golden Gate National Recreation Area.

== Early life ==
O'Neill was born in Washington, D.C., on September 17, 1941. He gained an appreciation for the wilderness from his family who would often take him camping when he was young. While in high school O'Neill and his twin brother Alan, along with their mother, founded a nonprofit organization to take urban children on trips to national parks. O'Neill attended and graduated from the University of Maryland, College Park with a degree in geography.

== Park related work ==
O'Neill joined the U.S. Geological Survey in 1964. He later joined the Urban Studies Branch of the U.S. Bureau of Outdoor Recreation where he helped plan various parks. In 1973 he moved to Albuquerque, New Mexico after taking a job with the U.S. Heritage Conservation and Recreation Service (HCRS). O'Neill moved to San Francisco in 1979 as part of his job as the assistant regional director with HCRS.

O'Neill was instrumental in making the Phleger Estate and open to the public by insuring federal funding for the purchase of the land.

=== Work with the Golden Gate National Recreation Area ===
O'Neill served on the planning commission for the Golden Gate National Recreation Area (GGNRA), and it was his presentation at the White House to President Nixon that convinced the President to endorse the concept of a park in San Francisco. In 1981 O'Neill was named assistant superintendent with the GGNRA, and was promoted to superintendent in 1986.

As superintendent O'Neill oversaw the completion of the Cavallo Point conference center, as well as the renovation of The Marine Mammal Center. He is credited with making Alcatraz a world-class tourist destination, as well as being the driving forced behind getting Crissy Field incorporated into the GGNRA and its later renovation. Under his tenure as superintendent Mori Point was incorporated into the GGNRA. O'Neill work with Tom Lantos to purchase Rancho Corral de Tierra and incorporate it into the GGNRA.

== Later life ==
O'Neill had heart valve replacement surgery at the California Pacific Medical Center. While recovering he developed an infection, and died after suffering a series of strokes. He is survived by his wife and two adult children.

== Footnotes ==
- ^{a} Other sources say he was born in 1942, but give no day or month.

== Bibliography ==
- Fimrite, Peter; Nolte, Carl (May 14, 2009), "Popular GGNRA superintendent Brian O'Neill dies", San Francisco Chronicle, Hearst Corporation, pp. B–1, archived from the original on May 21, 2009
- Prado, Mark (May 13, 2009), "GGNRA Superintendent Brian O'Neill dies", Marin Independent Journal, MediaNews Group, archived from the original on March 7, 2012
- Rogers, Paul (May 15, 2009), "Golden Gate National Recreation Area superintendent dies", San Jose Mercury News, MediaNews Group, archived from the original on June 29, 2011
