= Stevens Creek (California) =

Creek in Santa Clara County, California

Stevens Creek Cupertino Creek
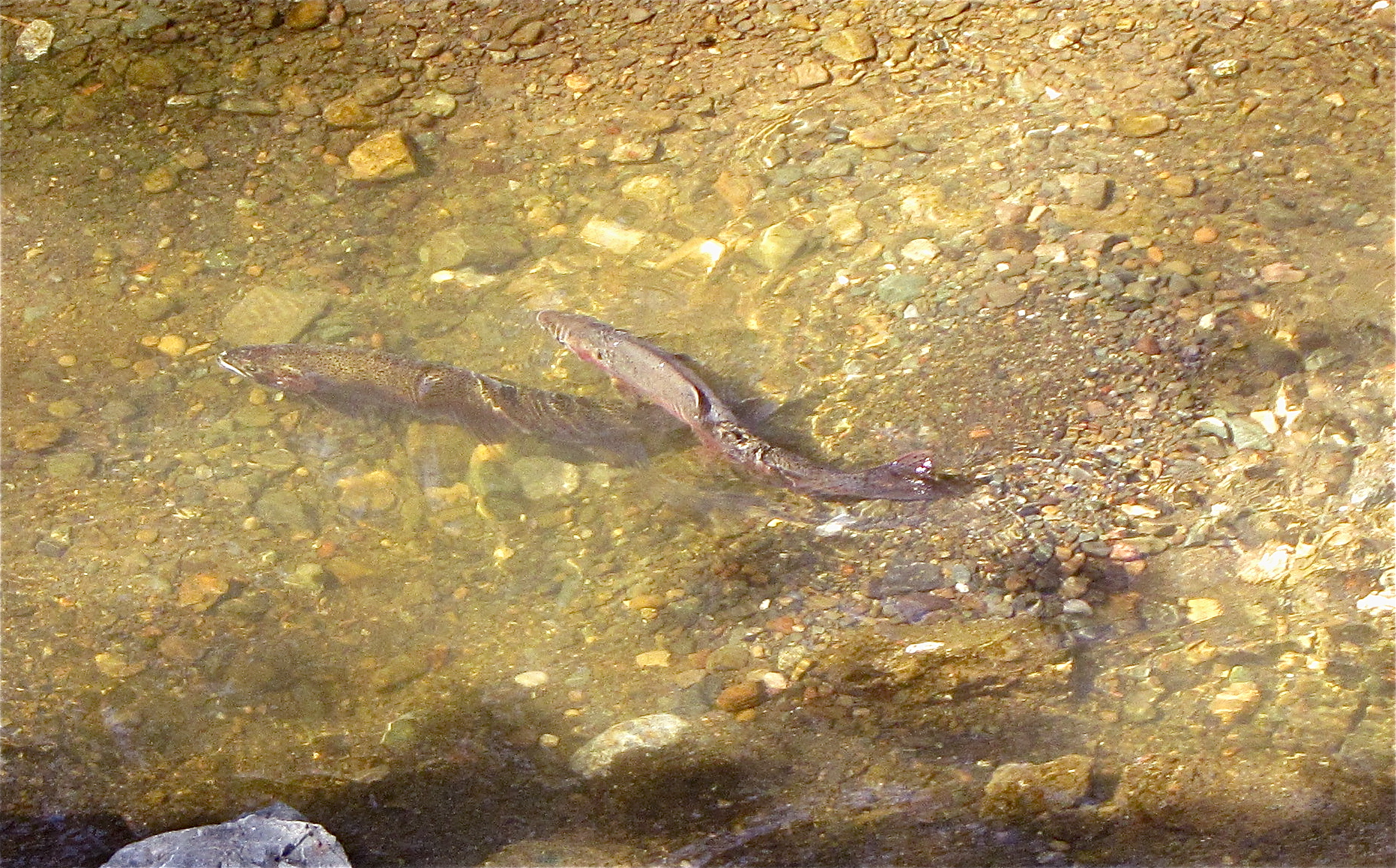
- Steelhead trout and spawning redd on Stevens Creek

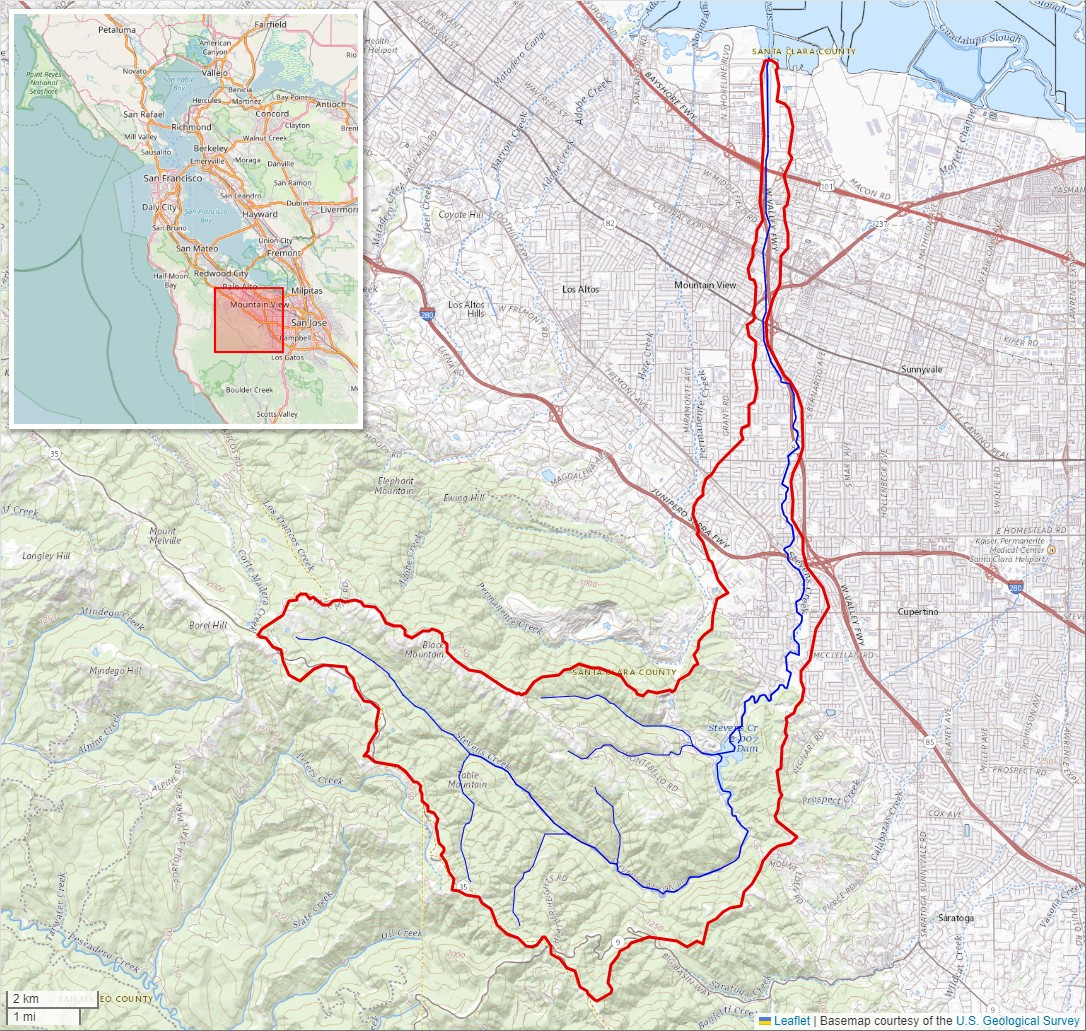
- Stevens Creek watershed (Interactive map)
- Native name: Arroyo San José de Cupertino (Spanish)

Location
- Country: United States
- State: California
- Region: Santa Clara County
- City: Mountain View, California

Physical characteristics
- Source: Black Mountain in the Santa Cruz Mountains
  - location: Monte Bello Open Space Preserve
  - coordinates: 37°18′40″N 122°11′14″W
- Mouth: Southwest San Francisco Bay
  - location: Whisman Slough, Mountain View, California
  - coordinates: 37°26′45″N 122°03′49″W
  - elevation: 3 ft (0.91 m)

Basin features
- Tributaries
  - left: Indian Creek (San Leandro River), Bay Creek (San Leandro River), Gold Mine Creek, Swiss Creek, Montebello Creek, Heney Creek

Arroyo de San José Cupertino
- Interactive map of Arroyo de San José Cupertino

California Historical Landmark
- Designated: December 23, 1964
- Reference no.: 800

Stevens Creek is a 20.9-mile-long (33.6 km) stream in Santa Clara County, California. The creek originates in the Santa Cruz Mountains on the western flank of Black Mountain in the Monte Bello Open Space Preserve near the terminus of Page Mill Road at Skyline Boulevard. It flows southeasterly through the Stevens Creek County Park before turning northeast into Stevens Creek Reservoir. It then continues north for 12.5 miles (20.1 km) through Cupertino, Los Altos, Sunnyvale and Mountain View before emptying into the San Francisco Bay at the Whisman Slough, near Google's main campus.

== History ==
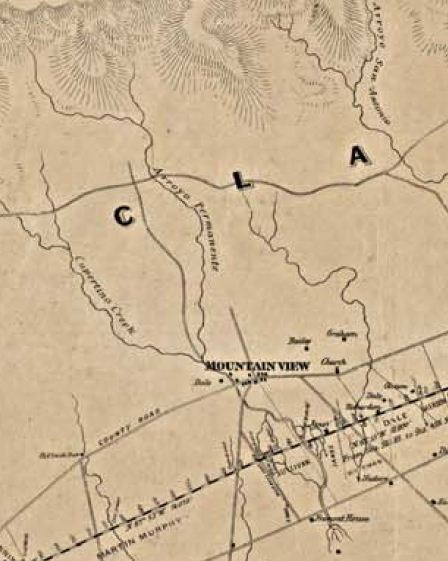
Portion of San Francisco & San Jose Railroad (Allardt) map showing historic connection of Permanente Creek (Arroyo Permanente) to Stevens Creek (then known as Cupertino Creek) circa 1862. These creeks ended in marshes that were hydrologically connected to the Bay at times of high winter flows. Hale Creek, unnamed and next stream to the right, does not appear connected to Permanente Creek in 1862 as it is today. Furthest to the right, the Arroyo San Antonio (Adobe Creek) is shown.

The creek was originally named Arroyo San José de Cupertino (Spanish for Saint Joseph of Cupertino Creek) by Spanish explorer Juan Bautista de Anza, who camped along the creek on his expedition from Monterey to San Francisco. De Anza completed the first overland route to San Francisco Bay when he and Father Pedro Font sighted the bay from a prominent knoll near the entry of Rancho San Antonio County Park. In de Anza's diary on March 25, 1776, he states that he "arrived at the "Arroyo San José de Cupertino", which is useful only for travelers. Here we halted for the night, having come eight leagues in seven and a half hours. From this place we have seen at our right the estuary which runs from the port of San Francisco." The Diocese of San Jose recently dedicated de Anza's Knoll as permanent public open space.

The Saint Joseph of Cupertino place name is preserved today in the city of Cupertino to the east and in the Saint Joseph of Cupertino Parish Catholic church in the city. The Arroyo San José de Cupertino became Cupertino Creek sometime before 1866, but was later re-named for Elijah Stephens (how his name was misspelled is unknown), a South Carolina-born blacksmith and trapper who settled on Cupertino Creek in 1848. Stephens renamed his 160-acre (0.65 km^{2}) property at the base of Black Mountain "Blackberry Farm". Stephens is notable for being the captain of the Stephens–Townsend–Murphy Party, the first wagon train to cross the Sierra Nevada (two years before the ill-fated Donner Party).

== Watershed ==
Stevens Creek enters the San Francisco Estuary near Long Point, north of Moffett Field Naval Air Station, at Whisman Slough between Mountain View's Shoreline Park and Stevens Creek Shoreline Nature Study Area. It drains a watershed of about 29 square miles (75 km^{2}).

There is one major impoundment (dam), Stevens Creek Reservoir at 531 feet (162 m) of elevation. The reservoir was constructed in 1935 to provide storage capacity of winter runoff that could be used to recharge the Santa Clara valley aquifer. The reservoir is managed by the Santa Clara Valley Water District (SCVWD) and has a current capacity of 3,465 acre-feet (4,274,000 m^{3}) of water. As currently managed by the SCVWD, flows are released during summer months which result in maintaining a wet channel for approximately 5.7 miles (9.2 km) downstream of the Reservoir (to Fremont Avenue) in order to preserve steelhead.

Tributaries above the Stevens Creek Reservoir include Indian Creek, Bay Creek, Gold Mine Creek, Swiss Creek and Montebello Creek. One tributary, Heney Creek, joins the mainstem 3.7 miles (6.0 km) below the Reservoir. Additionally, a diversion channel from Permanente Creek (constructed in 1959) sends winter storm flows into Stevens Creek approximately 6.3 miles (10.1 km) below the reservoir.

== Stevens Creek Trail ==
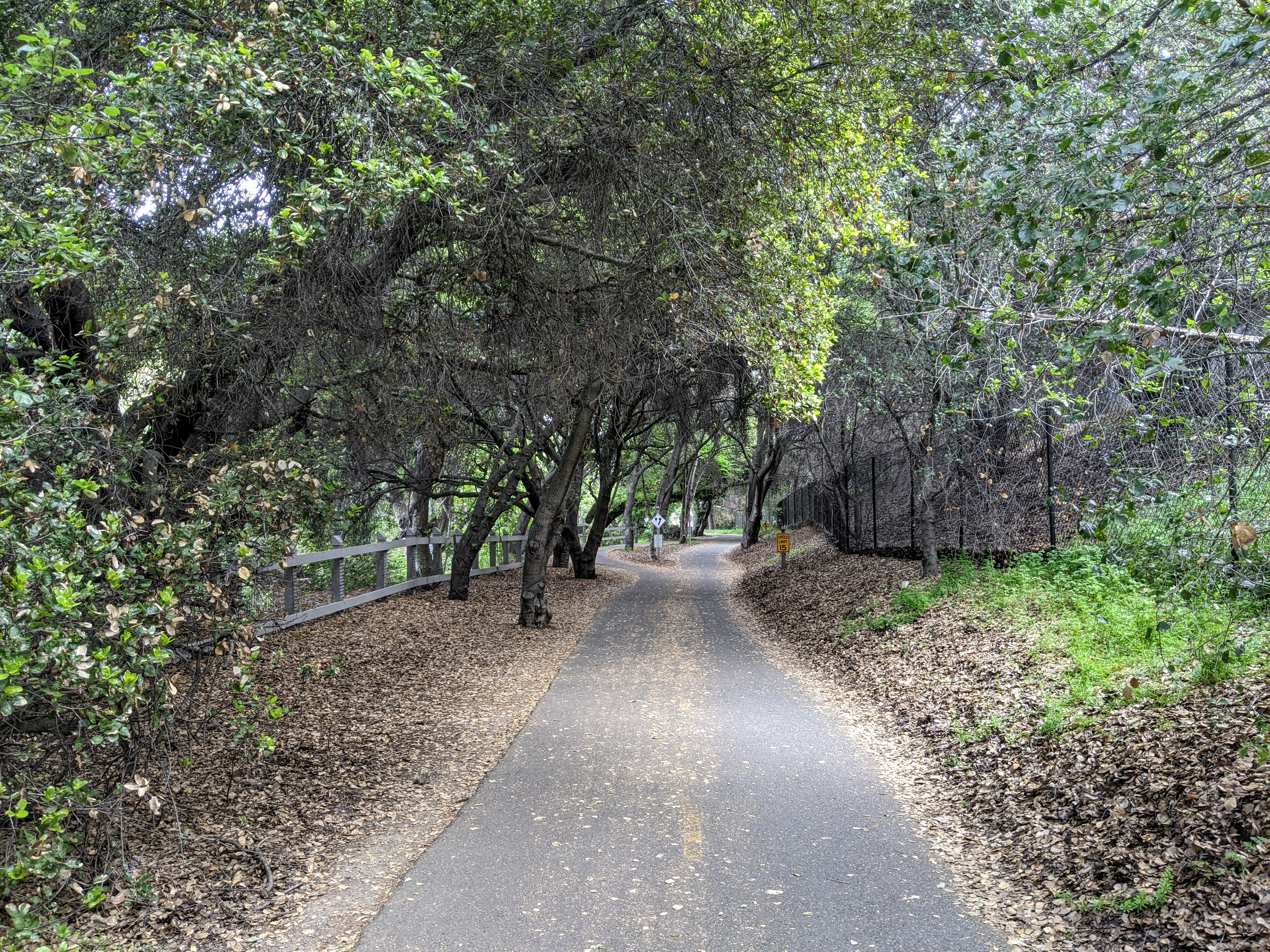
A view along the Stevens Creek Trail near downtown Mountain View

The Stevens Creek Trail is a 5-mile (8 km) long bicycle and pedestrian path that runs south continuously from Shoreline Park to Heatherstone Way in Mountain View. Cupertino has completed an approximately 1-mile (1.6 km) section of trail that runs north along the creek from McClellan Road to Stevens Creek Blvd., passing the 4-H farm and community gardens in McClellan Ranch Park nature preserve, and the Blackberry Farm Park. The trail is entirely separated from vehicular traffic, using numerous overcrossings and underpasses.

The four cities of Sunnyvale, Cupertino, Los Altos, and Mountain View cooperated on potential trail alignments with the goal of a completed trail from the Bay to the Santa Cruz Mountains; they produced a recommendation, which was approved by all four cities, and then disbanded their joint city working team.

== Habitat and conservation ==
=== Steelhead trout ===
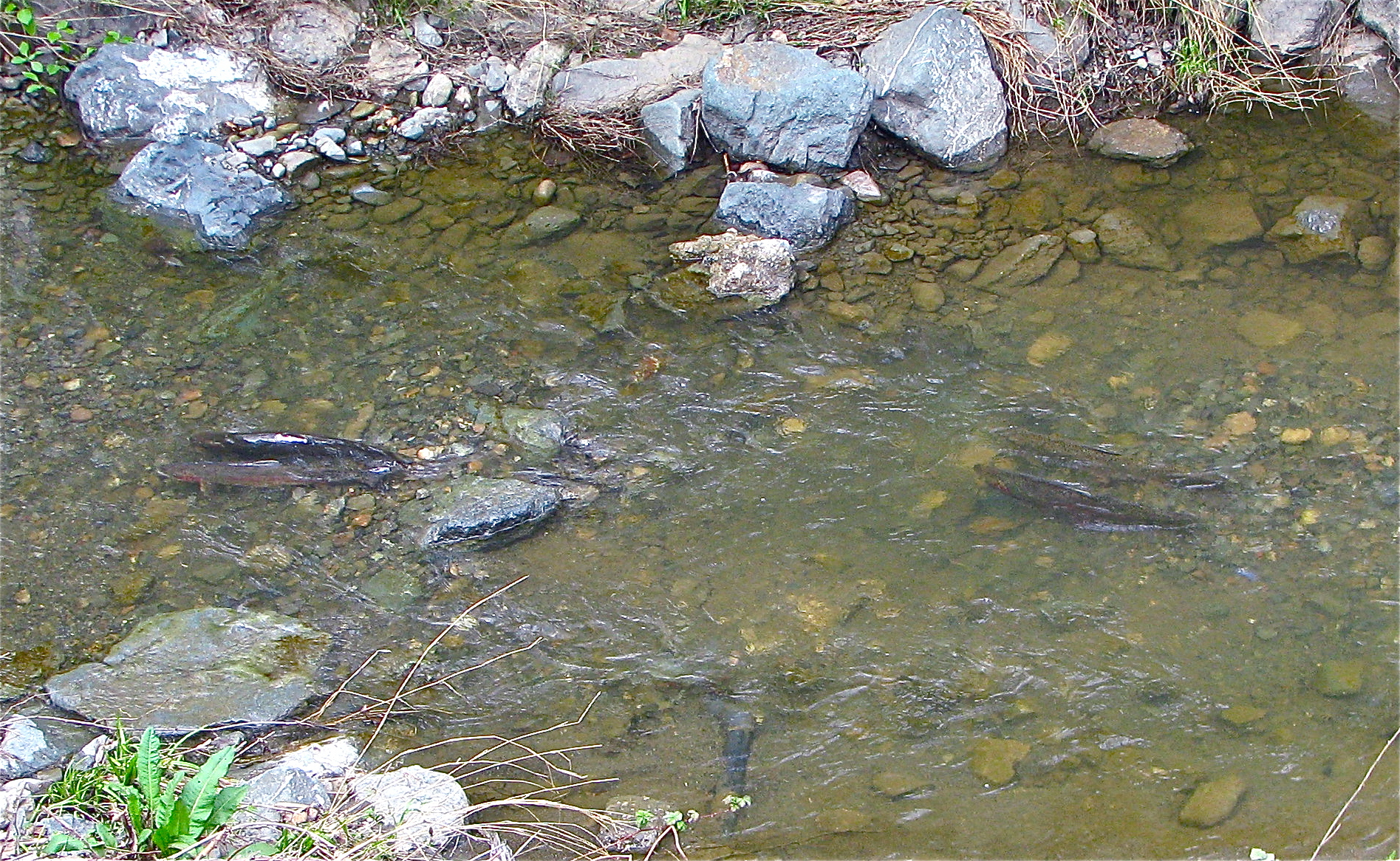
Two pairs of steelhead trout spawning in lower reaches of Stevens Creek may have had difficulty ascending to former spawning grounds due to fish passage barriers

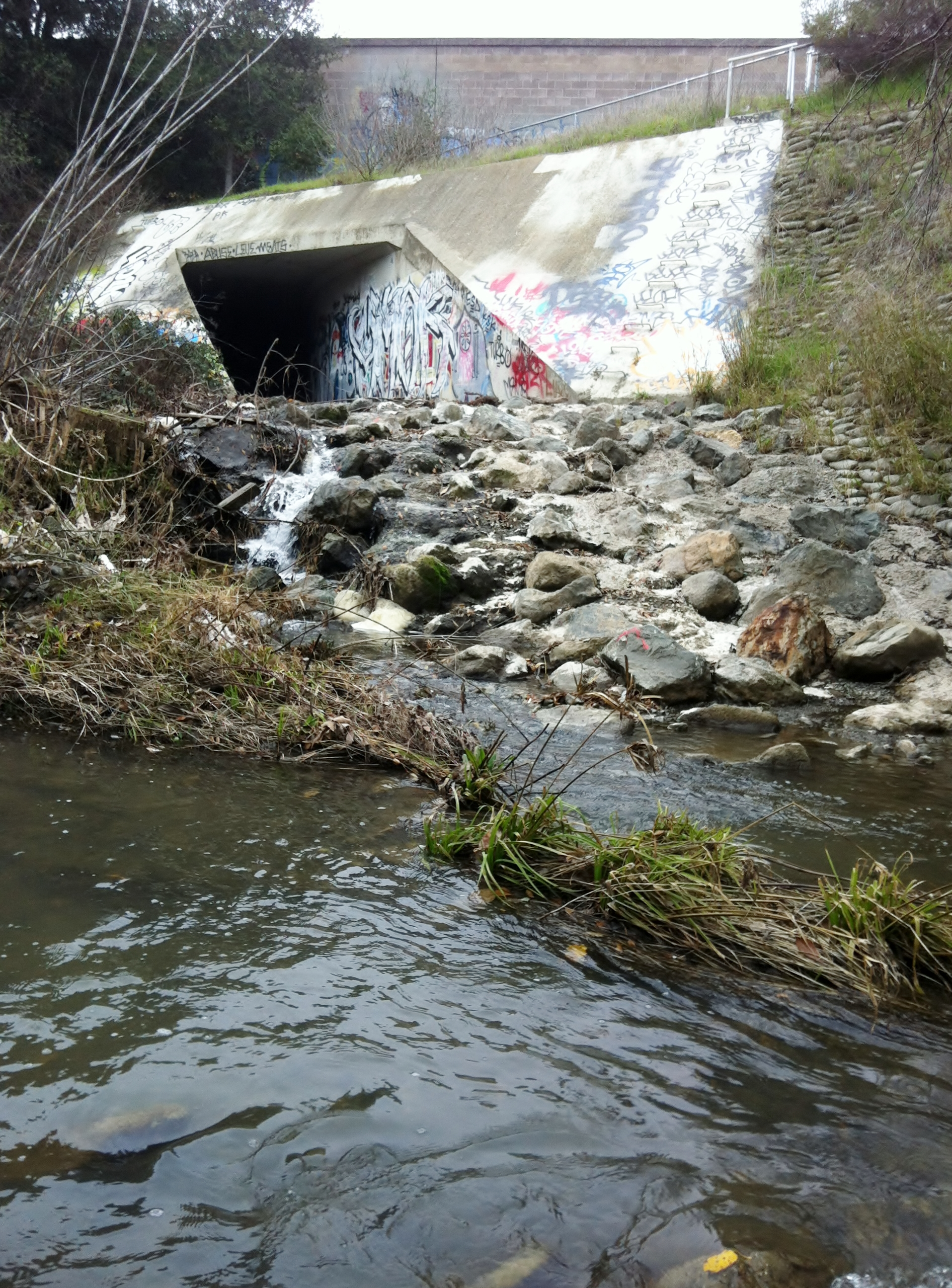
Looking west, from east side of Stevens Creek, at terminus of Permanente Creek Diversion Channel as it exits beneath Highway 85. Here Permanente Creek drops about ten vertical feet over cemented boulders, an impassable barrier to in-migrating steelhead trout, 2013.

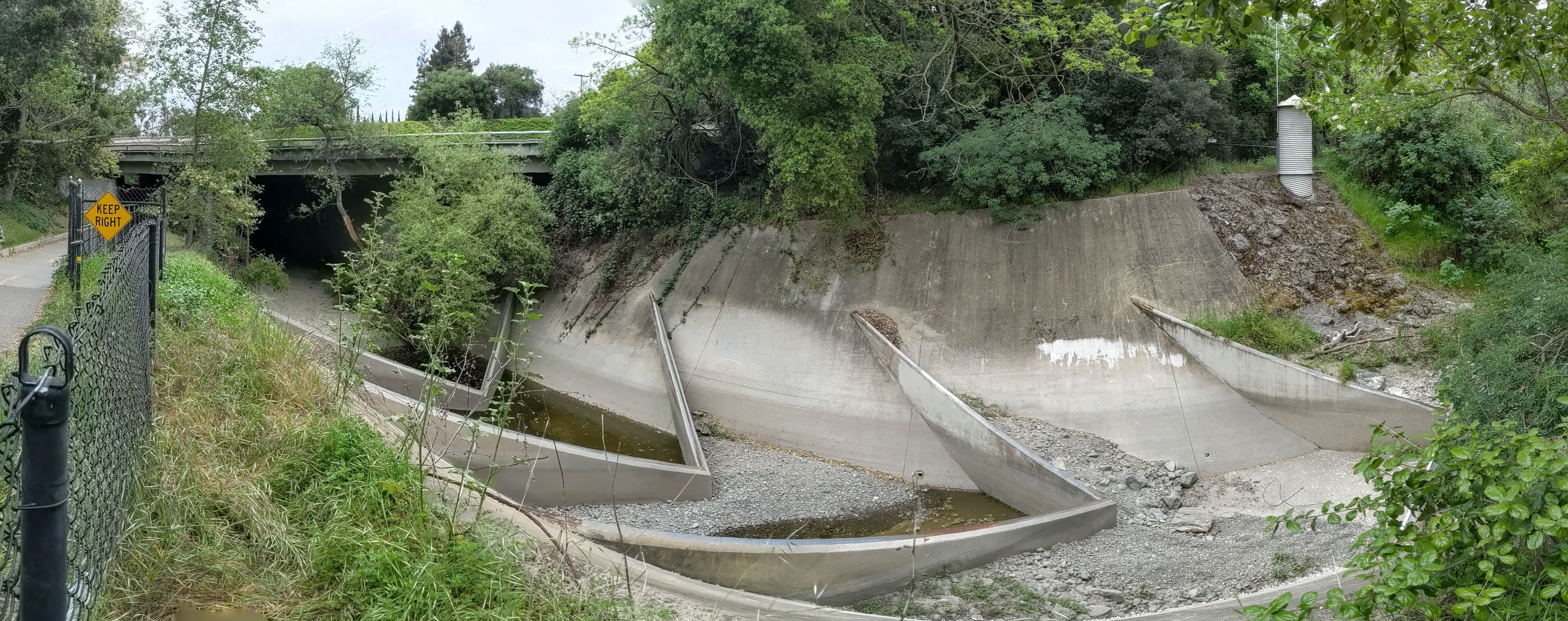
Stevens Creek in Mountain View, just above where it crosses under California Route 85, showing fish-passage baffles

Stevens Creek was one of the prime steelhead (coastal rainbow trout) (Oncorhynchus mykiss irideus) habitats within the county. The Sportsman Gazetteer in 1877 touted Stevens Creek as a trout fishing destination. Six physical specimens were collected in 1893 by Stanford Biology Professor W. W. Thoburn and are in the California Academy of Sciences collection. In 1898 John Otterbein Snyder collected steelhead trout specimens in Stevens Creek. Leidy reviewed numerous historical observer and sampling records of steelhead trout in Stevens Creek throughout the twentieth century and noted that hatchery stock planted in the creek did not seem to survive like the native, wild trout did. In a genetic study of fish from Santa Clara Valley streams, Stevens Creek and other trout had coastal steelhead ancestry and no substantial introgression of hatchery trout. The Stevens Creek fish were closely related to the steelhead trout in nearby basins.

However, there are significant barriers for anadromous steelhead to run up Stevens Creek to spawn. In a 1994 study, the Santa Clara Valley Water District (SCVWD) found fish ladders at the Central Expressway and U.S. Route 101 often had insufficient flow and/or were clogged with debris and sediment. In addition, the drop structure at L'Avenida Avenue was impassable in all five years of the study. In August, 2003 the Stevens & Permanente Creeks Watershed Council was officially formed to support stewardship of the watersheds. The SCVWD's Fish and Aquatic Habitat Collaborative Effort (FAHCE), has recommended removal of the Denil-type fish ladders at Fremont Avenue, Evelyn Avenue, and Moffett Boulevard which tend to clog with debris and are now classified as partial barriers by the California Department of Fish and Game (CDFG). Adjacent to the fish ladder at Moffett Boulevard is a concrete drop structure built in the 1980s which is another obstacle to salmonid passage. The existing concrete-lined channel extending further downstream to Highway 101 (a distance of 450 feet (140 m)) is flat and low flows cross it as a thin sheet of water over the concrete bottom. At least 6 inches (150 mm) depth of flow is required for adequate fish passage. Although steelhead continue to spawn in lower Stevens Creek, it is doubtful whether young trout can oversummer for one to two years in its drier, hotter lower reaches. In a 2004 report of factors limiting steelhead trout survival, the key recommendation was to improve access for spawning steelhead in the lower reaches of the creek (which gets very warm or even dry in summer) to the upper reaches of Stevens Creek which have perennial flows of colder water. In addition, if the Permanente Creek Diversion Channel could be modified to accommodate steelhead trout in-migration, then potentially 9 miles (14 km) of upper Permanente Creek, which currently holds a population of resident coastal rainbow trout, would be available for spawning. A NOAA/National Marine Fisheries Service report on the Stevens Creek steelhead trout population in April 2013 found a high density of spawning Redds below the Evelyn Avenue fish ladder and grade control structure, but that this barrier was forcing most of the steelhead to spawn in the undesirable lower reaches of the stream, and that it has been a significant barrier to upstream spawning runs for at least the past four years. Under the water district's Fish and Aquatic Habitat Collaborative Effort (FAHCE), Stevens Creek has been identified as one of the prime steelhead habitats within Santa Clara County and plans are underway to remove three barriers to fish passage in the lower creek: at Moffett Boulevard, Evelyn Avenue and Fremont Avenue.

Stevens Creek Dam blocks 8.6 miles (13.8 km) of potential anadromous steelhead trout spawning habitat further upstream.

=== Red-bellied newt ===
The red-bellied newt (Taricha rivularis) was thought to occur only in coast redwood (Sequoia sempervirens) forests 130 kilometres (81 mi) north of Stevens Creek in Sonoma County, California, however a disjunct population was discovered in the upper watershed of Stevens Creek that is genetically identical to the Sonoma County population. Whether the Stevens Creek newts were introduced or are a relict population is unclear.

=== Western burrowing owl ===
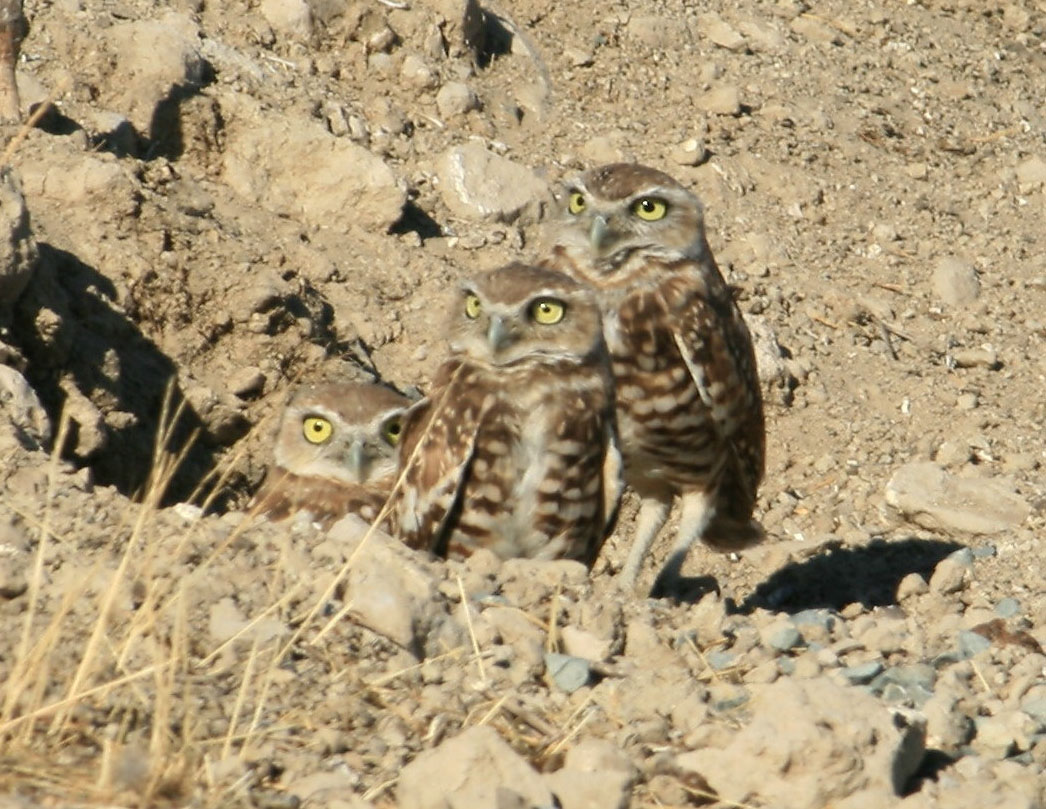
Western burrowing owls

The western burrowing owl (Athene cunicularia) nests at Shoreline Park near the mouth of Stevens Creek. In 2008, Mountain View evicted a pair of burrowing owls so that it could sell a parcel of land to Google to build a hotel at Shoreline Boulevard and Charleston Road. Eviction of the owls is controversial because the birds regularly reuse burrows for years, and there is no requirement that suitable new habitat be found for the owls. Despite being listed in 1979 as a Species of Special Concern (a pre-listing category under the Endangered Species Act) by the California Department of Fish and Game, California's population declined 60% from the 1980s to the early 1990s, and continues to decline at roughly 8% per year. In 1994, the U.S. Fish and Wildlife Service nominated the Western Burrowing Owl as a Federal Category 2 candidate for listing as endangered or threatened, but loss of habitat continues due to development of the flat, grassy lands used by the owl. According to The Institute for Bird Populations at Point Reyes, there has been a 50 percent decline in burrowing owl populations in the Bay Area in the last 10 to 15 years. Their status protects them from disturbance during nesting season or killing at any time, but does not guarantee them a permanent home, as outside of breeding season, owls can be evicted from their homes. A 1992–93 survey reported no breeding burrowing owls in Napa, Marin, and San Francisco counties, and only a few in San Mateo and Sonoma. The Santa Clara County population is declining and restricted to a few breeding locations, leaving only Alameda, Contra Costa, and Solano counties as the remnant breeding range.

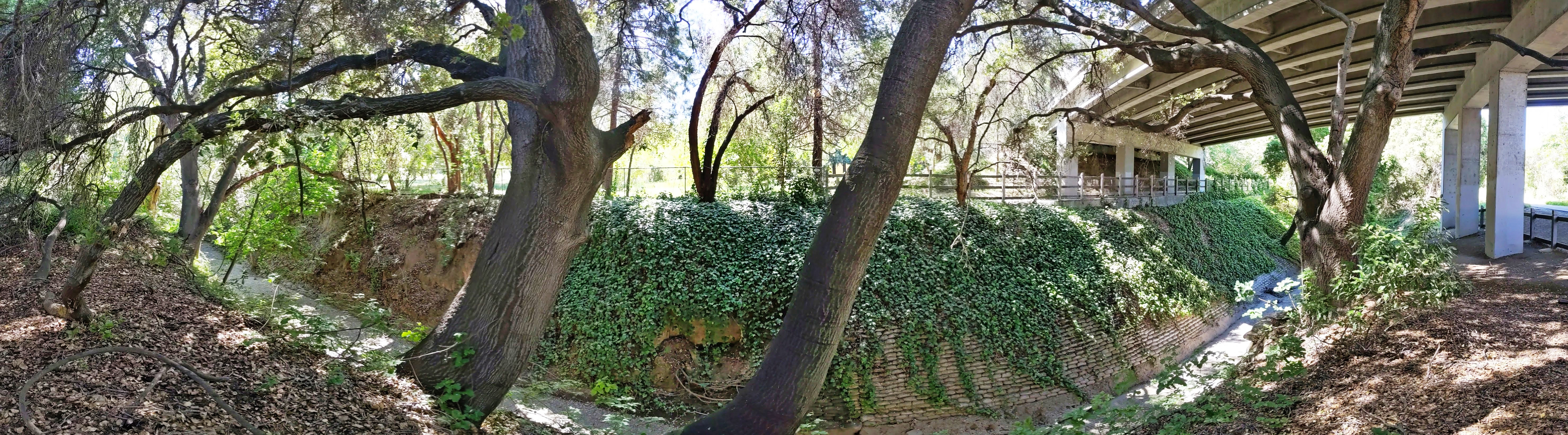
Stevens Creek from Stevens Creek Trail, just upstream of where they run under Mountain View's Dana Street overpass

== Landmark status ==
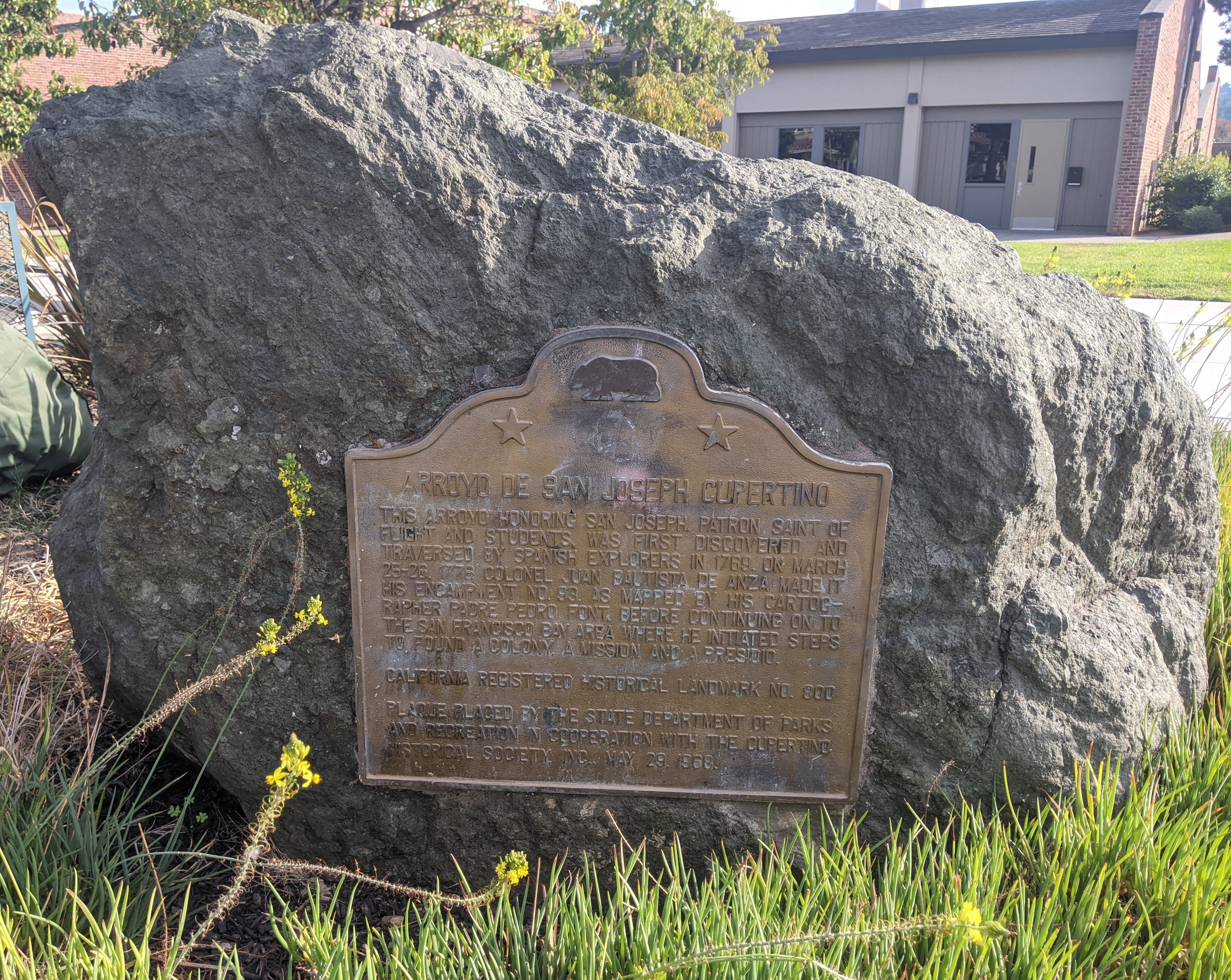
Arroyo de San Joseph Cupertino, CA, USA

On December 23, 1964, the Office of Historic Preservation designated Arroyo de San José Cupertino as a California historical landmark #800. A description on the commemorative plaque reads: "This arroyo honoring San Joseph, patron saint of flight and students, was first discovered and traversed by Spanish explorers in 1769. On March 25–26, 1776, Colonel Juan Bautista de Anza made it his encampment No. 93, as mapped by his cartographer, Padre Pedro Font, on his journey to the San Francisco Bay area where he initiated a colony, a mission, and a presidio."

== See also ==
- List of watercourses in the San Francisco Bay Area
- California Historical Landmarks in Santa Clara County
