= KFJC =

Radio station at Foothill College in Los Altos, California

- Los Altos, California; United States
- Broadcast area: San Francisco Peninsula
- Frequency: 89.7 MHz

Programming
- Format: Variety

Ownership
- Owner: Foothill-De Anza Community College District

History
- First air date: 1959
- Former frequencies: 88.5 MHz (1959–1962)
- Call sign meaning: Foothill Junior College

Technical information
- Licensing authority: FCC
- Facility ID: 22012
- Class: B1
- ERP: 110 watts
- HAAT: 562 meters
- Transmitter coordinates: 37°19′13.7″N 122°8′32.8″W

Links
- Public license information: Public file; LMS
- Webcast: Listen live
- Website: kfjc.org

KFJC (89.7 FM) is a student-run college and community radio station licensed to Foothill College in Los Altos Hills, California. The station, which has a Variety format, broadcasts a broad spectrum of musical genres as well as public affairs programming. KFJC serves the southern San Francisco Bay Area.

KFJC's mission is to be a conduit for new and interesting audio art and information. KFJC's music programming is largely oriented to recent material from many genres. Most programs must play at least 35% (by song count) tracks from material added in the last 8 weeks. The station is licensed to the trustees of the Foothill-De Anza Community College District and operated as a teaching laboratory for the Fine Arts and Communications Department of Foothill College. As a community radio station, the vast majority of KFJC's small operating budget is raised during their annual fundraiser held each October, which is supplemented by other community events such as penny-pitches, film festivals, and the like.

KFJC's 300-watt transmitter is located on Black Mountain, in the Monte Bello Open Space Preserve, south of Los Altos, California.

== History ==
KFJC signed on October 20, 1959, broadcasting from a broom closet at the old Foothill Junior College campus in Mountain View. The station broadcast from 5 p.m. until 7 p.m. Monday through Thursday, playing "study music" and pre-recorded educational materials. In 1961, Foothill Junior College and KFJC moved to their current location in Los Altos Hills; the station also moved from 88.5 to 89.7 MHz. In 1965, the first rock and roll record was played on KFJC, causing the DJ Woody Muff to be reprimanded shortly after. The next year, however, Woody was rewarded; on April 2, the first rock and roll show was allowed to run on KFJC. It did not last a year, however, before it was forced off the air by more conservative staff members.

By 1968, KFJC numbered 100 staff volunteers and was broadcasting from noon to 9:30 p.m. Monday through Friday. Rock and roll was making more frequent appearances on the station. In 1970, KFJC hosted an open mike session during a nationwide student strike that had also shut down the Foothill College campus.

From the late 1960s to 1972, KFJC was a block-formatted station run by students who were in a 2-year broadcasting program, playing mainly top 40, specialty/ethnic, or progressive rock, the disc-jockey's choice. Airshifts were assigned by the program director, but the schedule was loose and allowed for station sign-offs if slots were unfilled. Record service was intermittent with mostly single 45s being issued from the record companies.

In 1972 several of the students joined managers Keith Garvey and Ted Brooks to professionalize station operation. Regular playlists were now compiled for the record companies, tallied from the songs DJs chose to play that week. This enabled KFJC to get professional record service. The emphasis turned to competing with the local professional progressive rock stations (mainly KOME, KSJO, and KSAN). As a distinction, DJs highlighted songs and albums that were exclusively played on KFJC. Several ethnic and specialty shows were also part of the programming during these years. The broadcast day was increased to 24 hours and according to surveys conducted by KOME, KFJC had quite a following during the 1973-1975 era.

Jona Denz was elected Station Manager in 1974 with a goal of raising the station's power and upgrading from mono to stereo broadcasting. She and her staff began the Dead Air Club as a fundraising entity and developed a series of concerts, movies, and other events to achieve it. By 1975, KFJC had increased its power from 10 Watts mono to 250 Watts stereo, enhancing its sound quality while maintaining its reach from San Francisco to San Jose.

The station continued its cutting edge image in 1978 by redirecting its sound to distinctly punk/new wave. DJs were again encouraged to play "alternate" tracks, but from this particular genre, bands like the Ramones, Elvis Costello, the Knack, and the Clash, i.e., songs that weren't being played by the professional stations (KSJO, KOME, and KSAN). Influential players during this phase were General Manager Kerry Loewen, Music Director Bob Gibson, Program Director Robert "Quasimoto" Zepernick, News Director Teresa "Trash" Heinrich, Kevin "LION!" Hardiman, Todd E. Daniels, Boris Darling, Frankie Carbuncle, Bob "Bob Doll" Gaynor, Leslie "Chris Gray" Smith, Scott "Gideon Baxter" Sanderson, Kevin "Grranimal" Ariente, Ric (Sky) Curtice, Bryce "Mark Elliot" Canyon, Rabbi Fächman, Cubby Calcutta, Charles Hutchinson, Angstmaster Fast Max, Faulty Bagnose, Clive "Bongo" Fleishman, Elmo C. Esta, Anita "Know" Plep, Paul Kiely, Kelly Porter, Robert "Doc" Pelzel and the Duck from Columbia.

During the late 1970s to mid '80s era, a number of staff went on to join record companies as executives. The yearly pilgrimages to the CMJ Convention in New York City started around this time, and the West Coast interlopers from "The Wave of The West" literally made their mark on the Big Apple, for example: when CBGB's closed, photos were taken for a tribute book, and over the ladies' room sink was the distinctive red, black and white triangle logo sticker, allegedly affixed there by former promotions director Tracie Jarosh ("Sarah Barhear/Nancy Sin").

In 1981, KFJC started the annual tradition of the "Month of Mayhem", in which the month is filled with special programming from increased live mics to in-depth coverage of artists. On August 19, 1983, the station was newsworthy for playing variations of Louie Louie. The event, known as "Maximum Louie Louie", saw 823 versions of the song played over the course of 63 hours. The escapade was the result of a competition between Bay Area radio stations. It was covered by Bay Area media and featured in The Wall Street Journal.

In 1984 the KFJC studios were enlarged and received a bathroom, much to the delight of the DJs.

In 1985, KFJC hosted the Inter-Collegiate Broadcasting System Convention at the newly refurbished St. Claire Hilton in San Jose, California.

As a result of continuing successful fund raisers, in 2002 and 2003 KFJC studios were upgraded again, bringing new equipment introducing digital broadcast mixers as well as a 24-track digital portable multitrack recording system. In 2004 KFJC celebrated 45 years on the air with an entire day of 45s being played on October 31. KFJC no longer focuses its efforts as being a training ground for students wishing to enter the broadcasting industry. Each show continues to have its own personality as determined by the DJ (with approval from the program director). DJs follow a moderately strict break clock and all shows (with the exception of certain "specialty shows") must play a minimum of 35% of their content from recently added material—known as the "current library". The exceptions to this policy are during "live mics" when bands play live at the station in an area affectionately known as "the pit", the occasional "Freak Week" of freeform programming, and the "Month of Mayhem" (May) when DJs are encouraged to come up with original programming focused on a band, a genre or another creative theme. KFJC celebrated its 50th anniversary in 2009 hosting a number of events throughout the year. The station held a logo contest and featured the winner and runners up in a San Jose art gallery exhibition called Blowing Minds Since 1959. Former KFJC DJs also joined in to help celebrate their 50th anniversary as part of a DJs from the past series, featuring memorable past DJs such as Hairy Kari, Jack Soil, Reject Girl, Peggy O, JC Clone, Diana Goddess of Pop, and Daryl Licht.

== See also ==
- Campus radio
- List of college radio stations in the United States
- List of community radio stations in the United States
