= Shoreline Park (Mountain View, California) =

Park in Mountain View, California, United States

Coordinates: 37.430°N 122.084°W

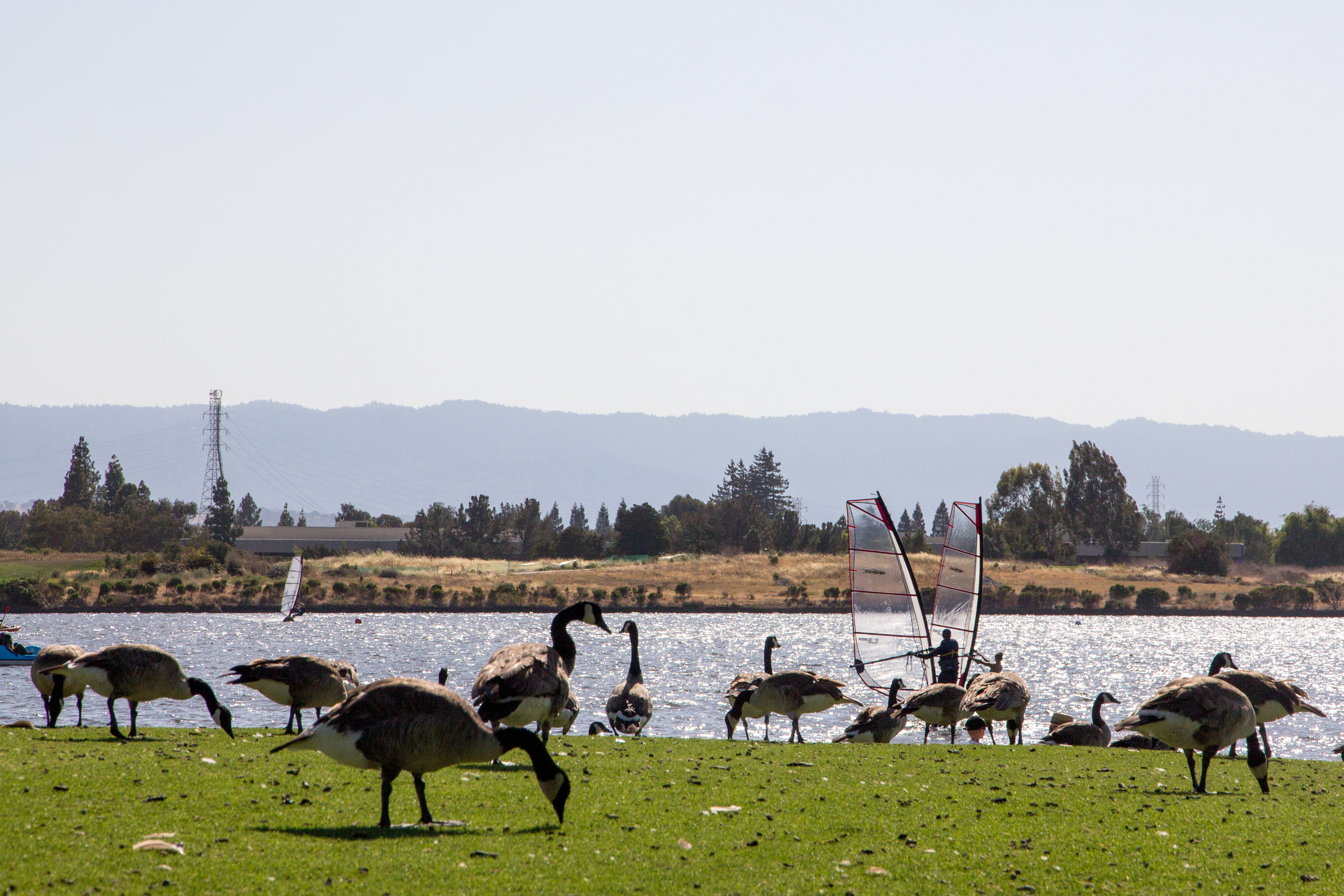
Image of Shoreline Park, Mountain View

Shoreline at Mountain View is a park in Mountain View, California, United States. The city park was dedicated in 1983, some fifteen years after the City undertook the daunting task of planning a regional park that would provide citizens with environmentally savvy recreation opportunities, from a site that was originally a landfill.

== History ==
The city of Mountain View bought the site in 1967 to build a recreational facility. However, the cost of importing earth to raise it by 20 feet (6.1 m) in order to prevent flooding was too high, so it was instead operated as a landfill accepting garbage from San Francisco. Shoreline Park opened in 1983, with some initial problems from methane fires. In 1987, Shoreline won the League of California Cities' Helen Putnam Award for public works.

== Features and trails ==
Shoreline Park now features an 18-hole links-style golf course with a pro shop and driving range, Shoreline Golf Links, and a 50-acre (20 ha) artificial lake. On the lake's eastern shore is the Shoreline Boathouse, which offers sailboat, windsurfing, kayak, canoe, rowboat, and pedalboat rentals, as well as sailing, windsurfing, and kayaking classes. The adjacent Shoreline American Bistro is open daily and offers a variety of food to lake goers. Shoreline Amphitheatre is next to the golf course. The Rengstorff House, a historic Victorian mansion moved to the park from its original location elsewhere in Mountain View, and Michaels at Shoreline Restaurant are also in the built-up area of the park.

Walkers, runners, bike riders, et al., can enjoy miles of paved and unpaved trails, some of which are part of the San Francisco Bay Trail. The trails connect to the Stevens Creek Trail at the eastern edge of the park and the Palo Alto Baylands Nature Preserve on the western edge.

== Critical habitat ==
Through the developed park, one reaches a wildlife refuge at the edge of the bay, where many birds can be seen at almost any time.

Meadowlands near the mouth of Permanente Creek in Shoreline Park provide critical remnant habitat for western burrowing owls (Athene cunicularia), a bird that has vanished from many counties in the Bay Area. The owl was listed as a Species of Special Concern (a pre-listing category under the Endangered Species Act) by the California Department of Fish and Game in 1979, and its Bay Area population continues to decline. In 2008, City of Mountain View evicted a pair of burrowing owls so that it could sell a parcel of land to Google to build a hotel at Shoreline Boulevard and Charleston Road. Eviction of the owls is controversial because suitable alternative habitat has vanished due to suburban sprawl. Development continued to encroach on the owls' habitat when, in 2010, the City of Mountain View approved Google's plan to build a 6.9-acre (2.8 ha) recreational park for its employees, so that they can play tennis, disc golf, shuffleboard and other activities on Google property that is part of the owls' foraging area. Although there were hundreds of burrowing owls in Santa Clara County when monitoring began in the 1980s, now there are only 35, with three breeding pairs raising ten eggs at Shoreline in 2011 (less than half the number of young in 2003).

== Gallery ==
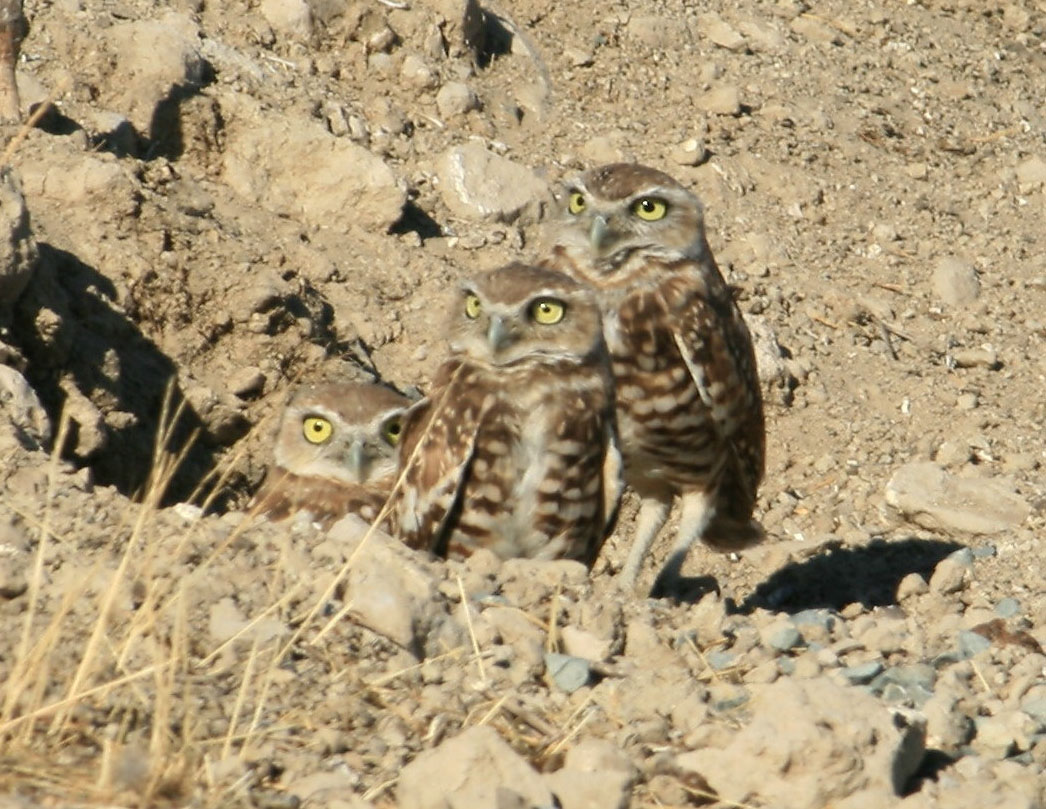
Family of Burrowing owls

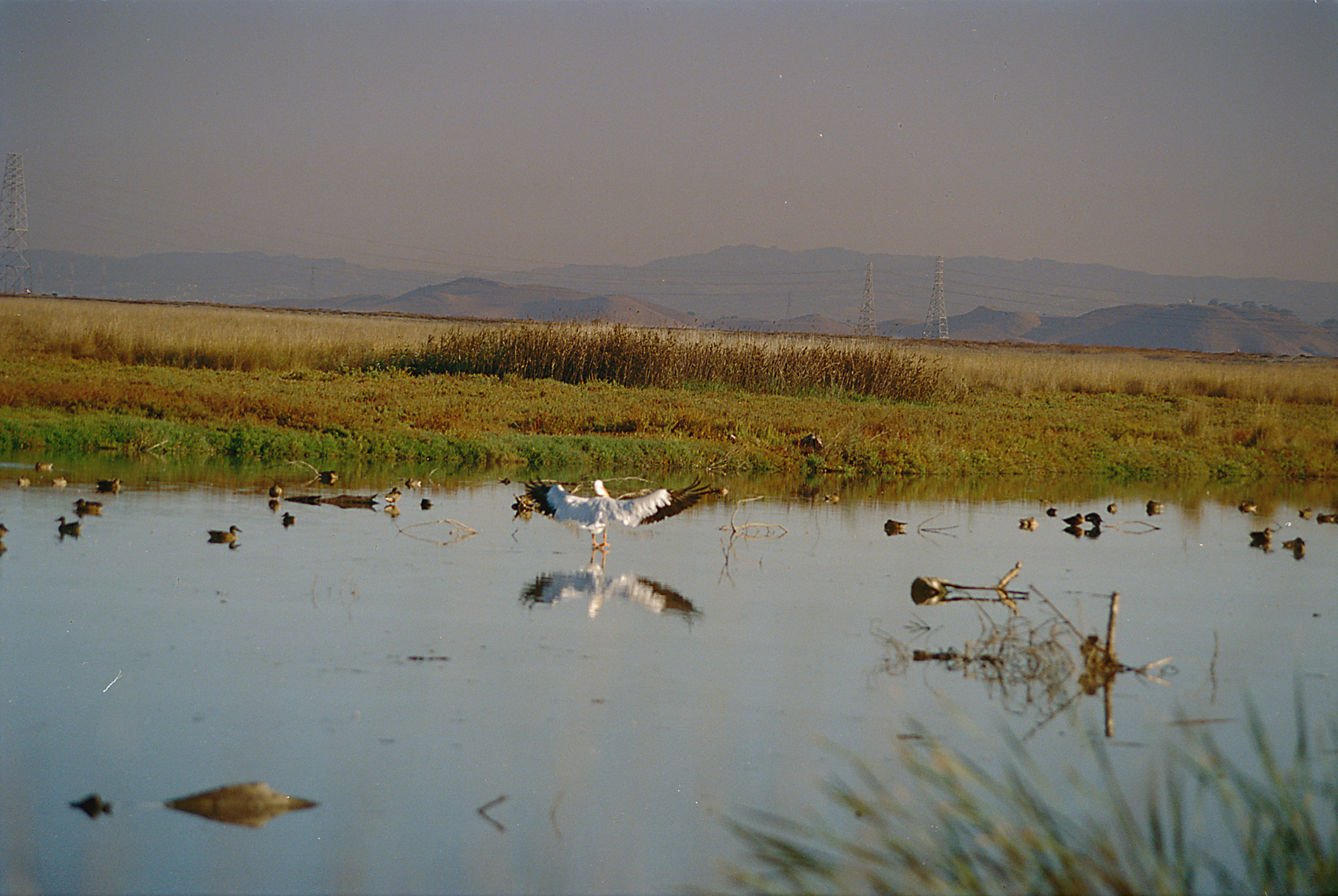
American white pelican landing by San Francisco Bay, Santa Cruz Mountains in background

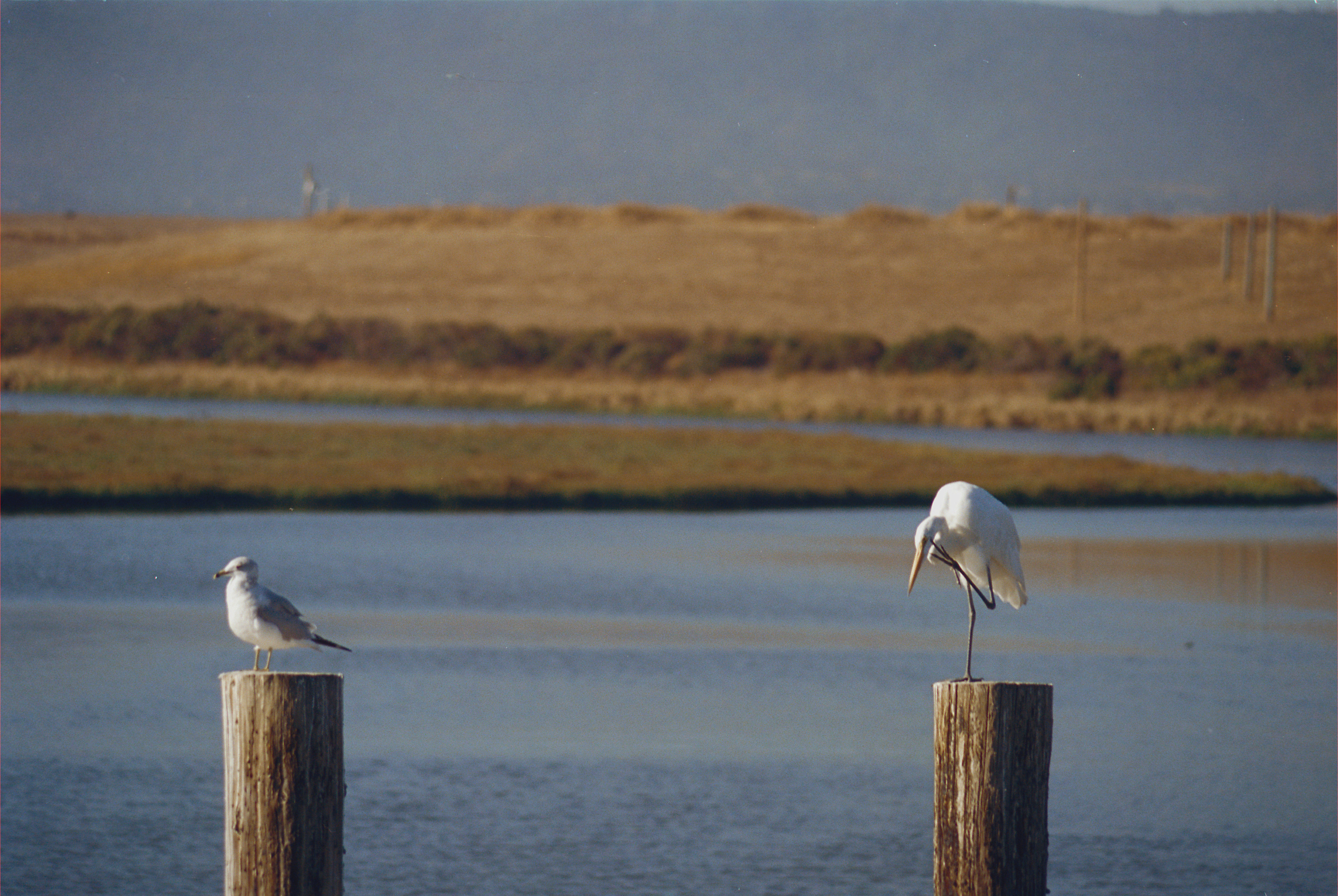
Greater egret and gull on pilings

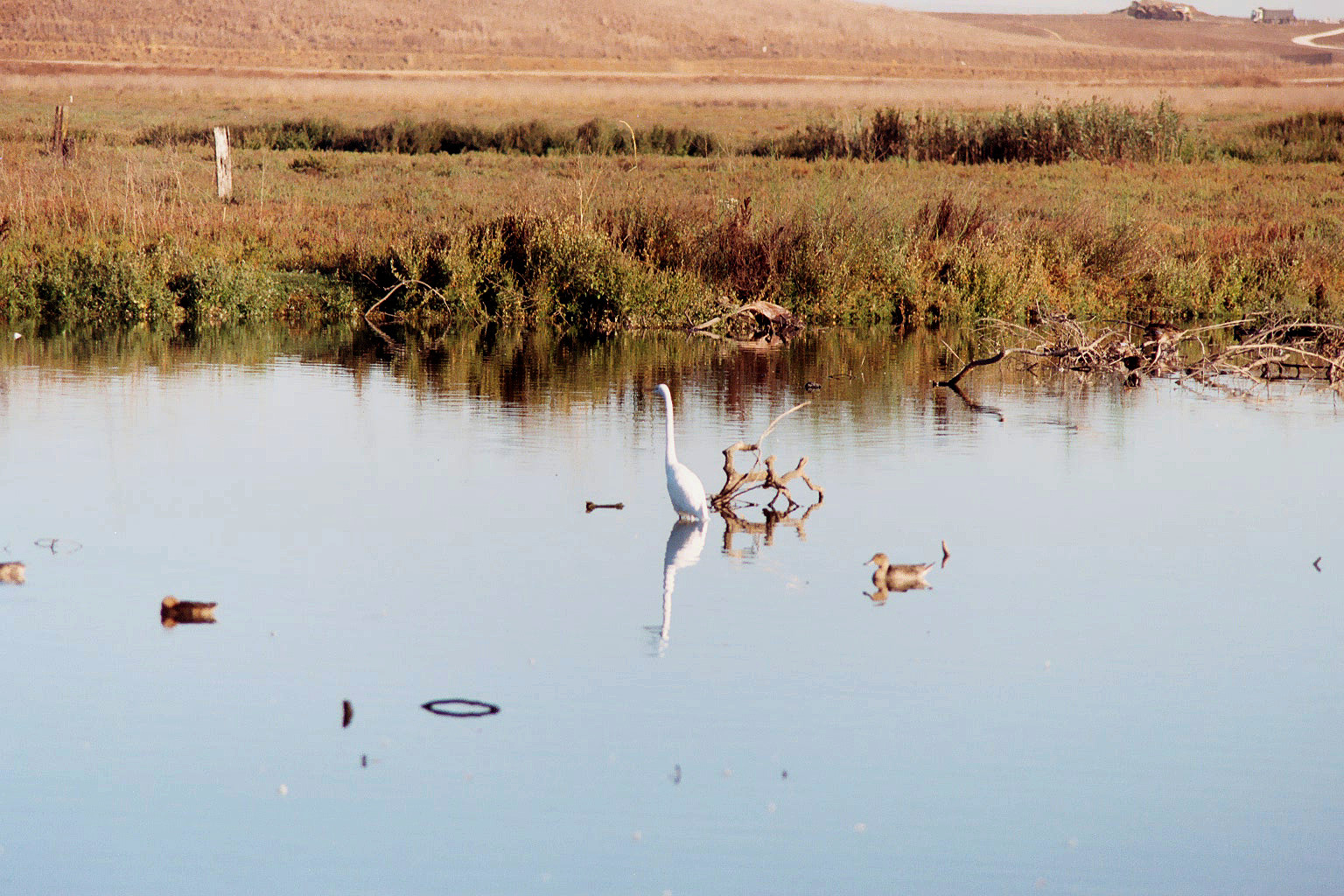
Great egret and ducks

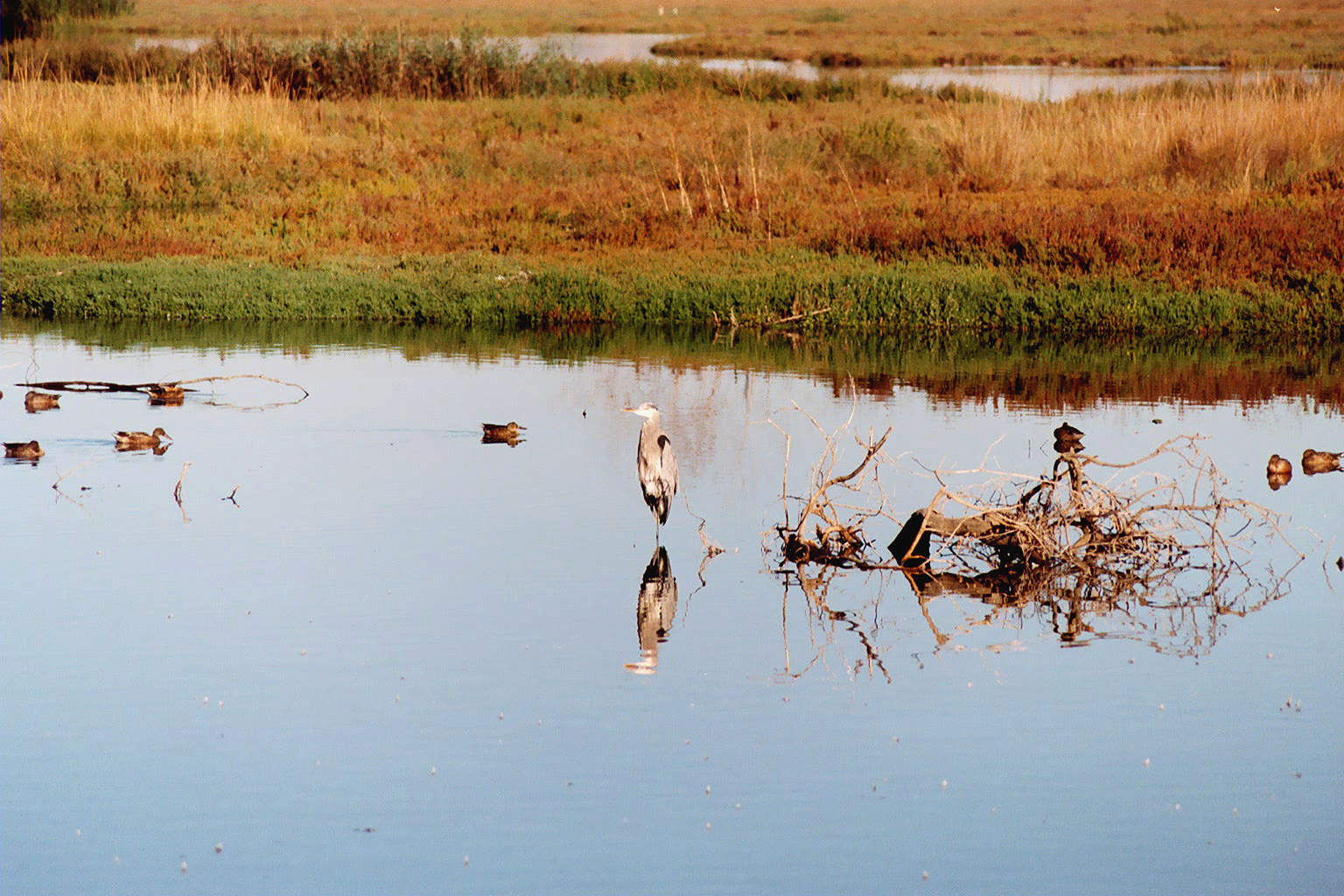
Great blue heron and ducks

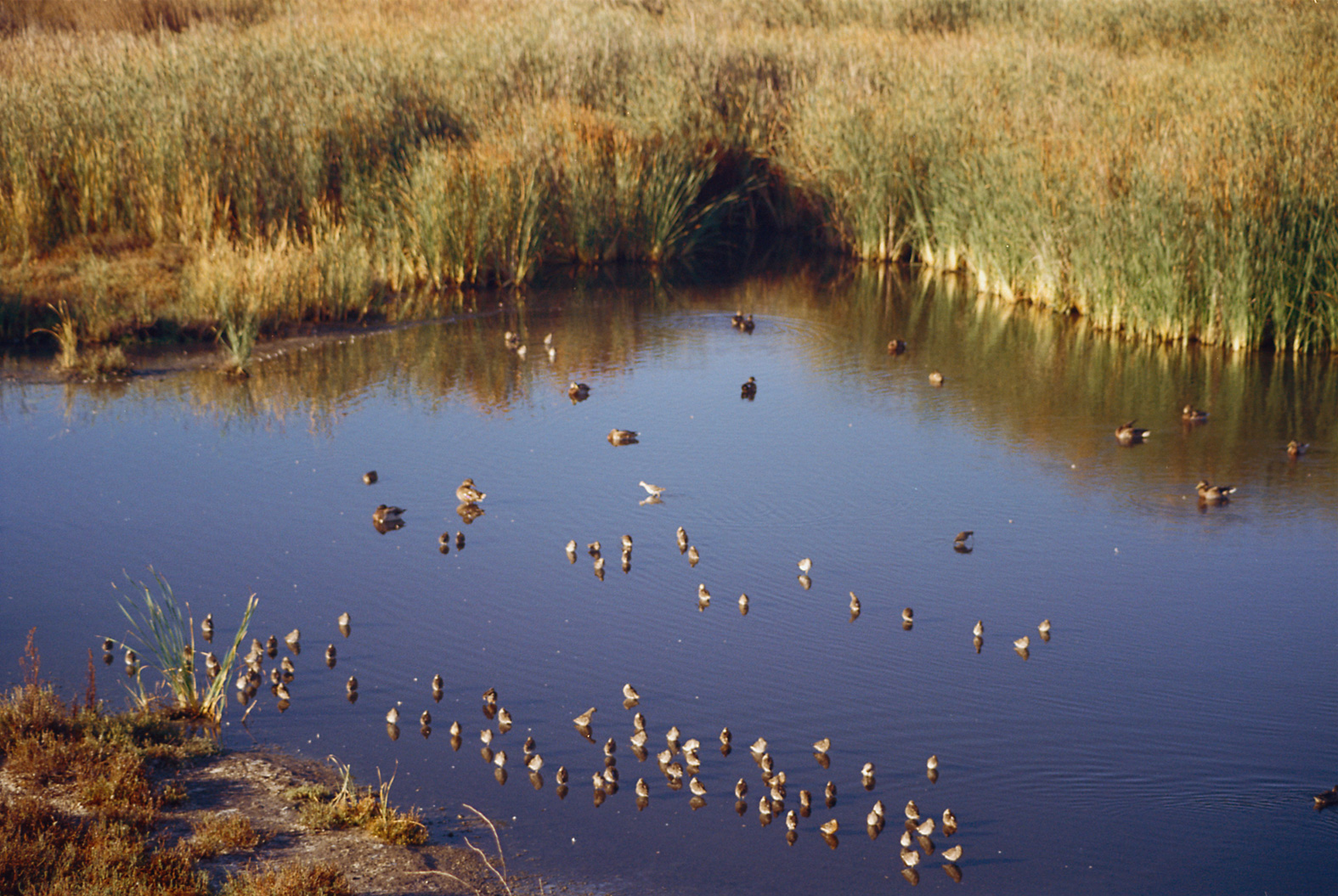
Small water birds

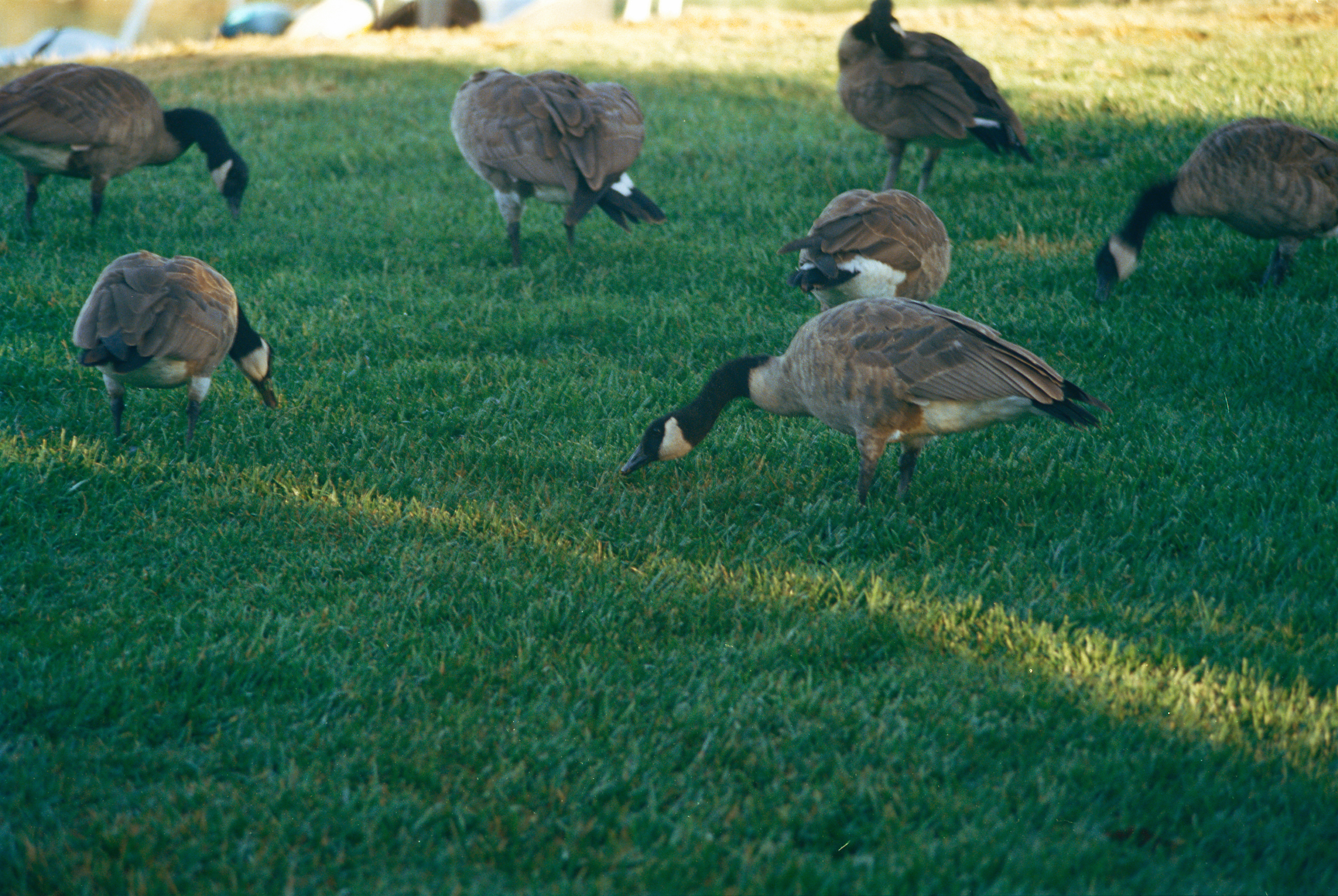
Canada geese in Shoreline Park

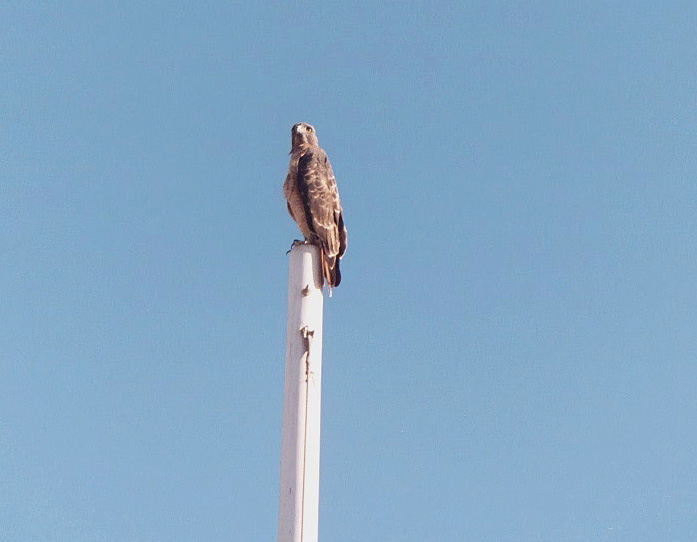
Hawk on pole

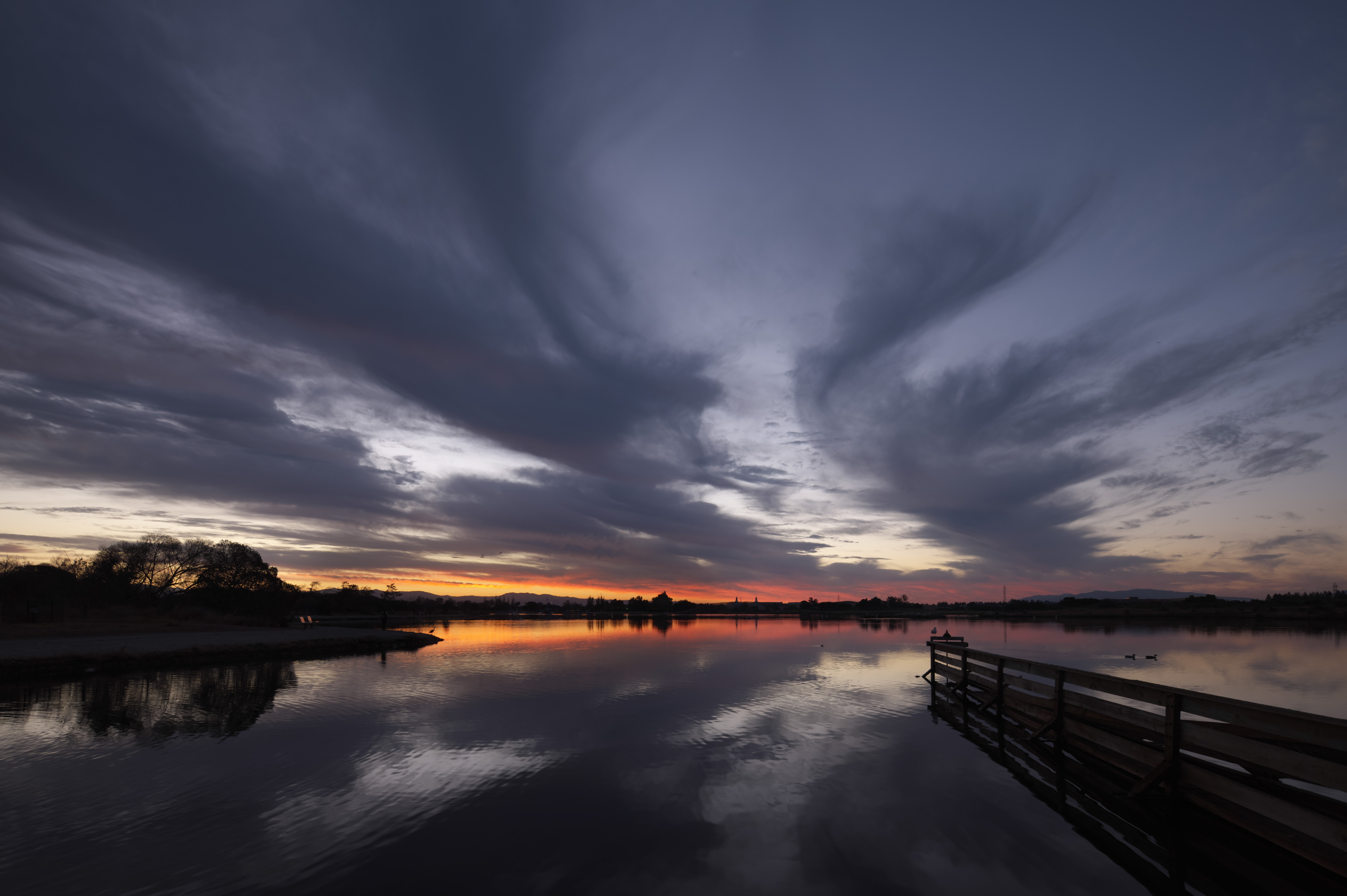
Early morning view of lake

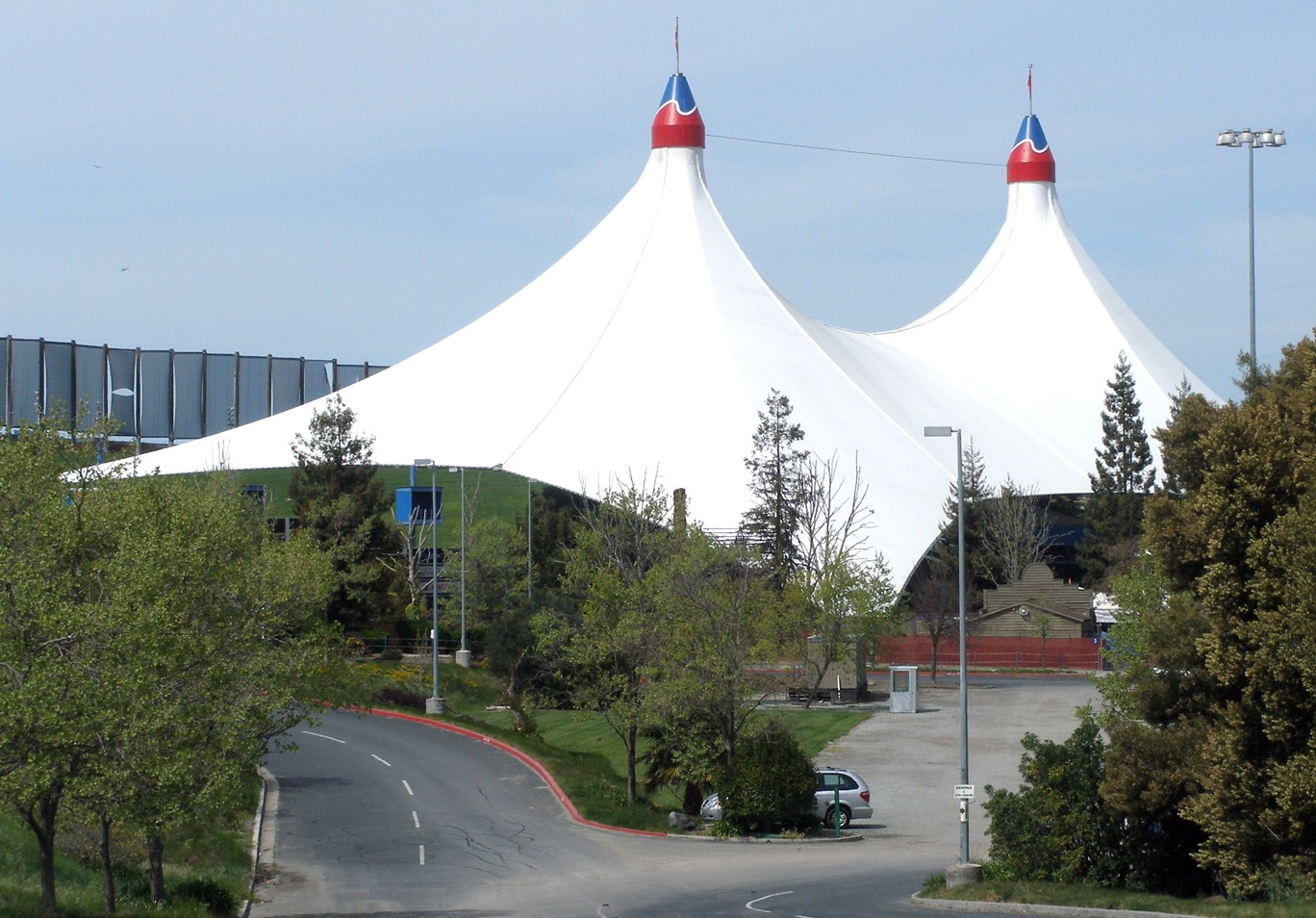
Shoreline Amphitheatre

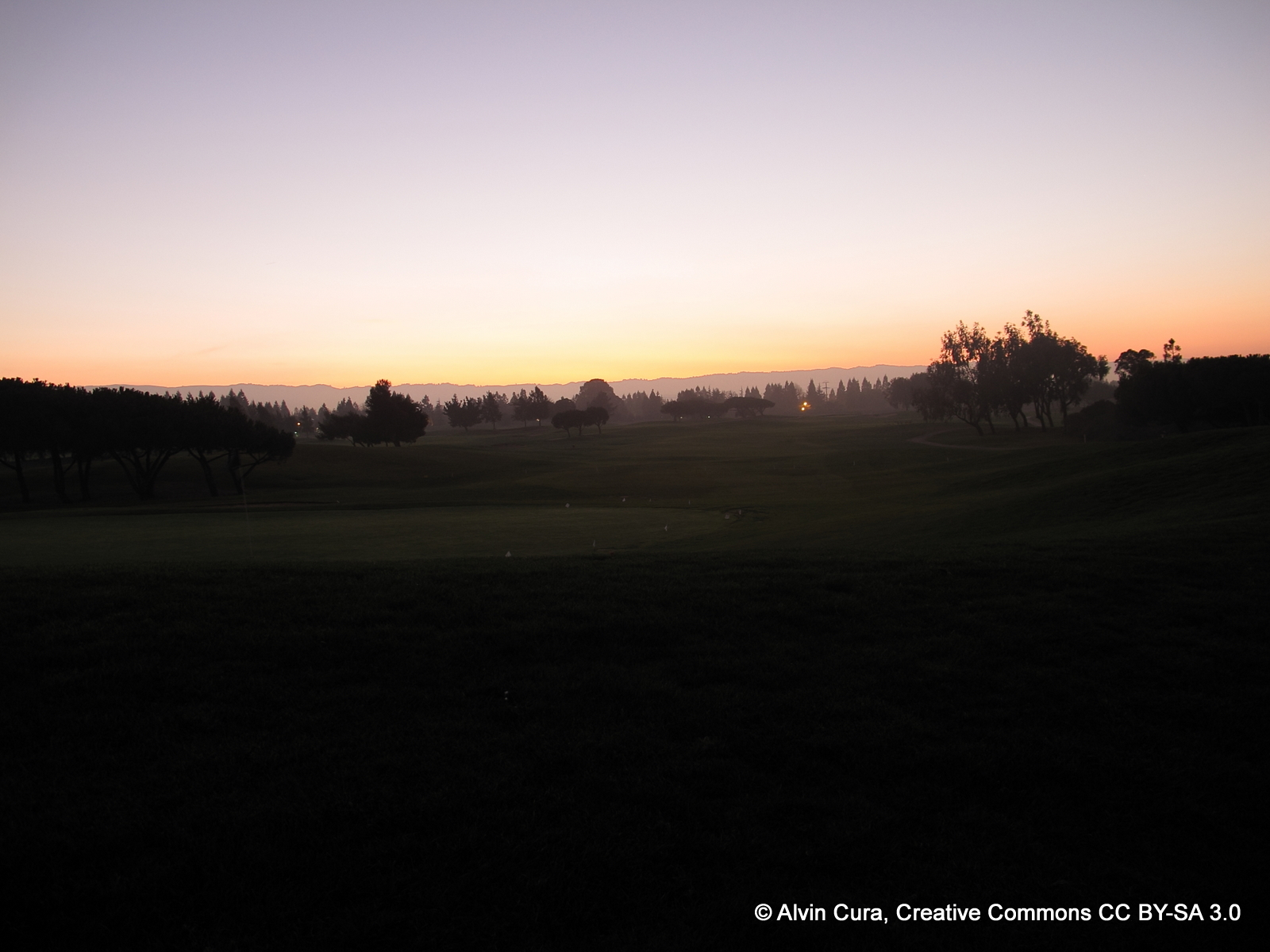
Shoreline Golf Links at Sunset

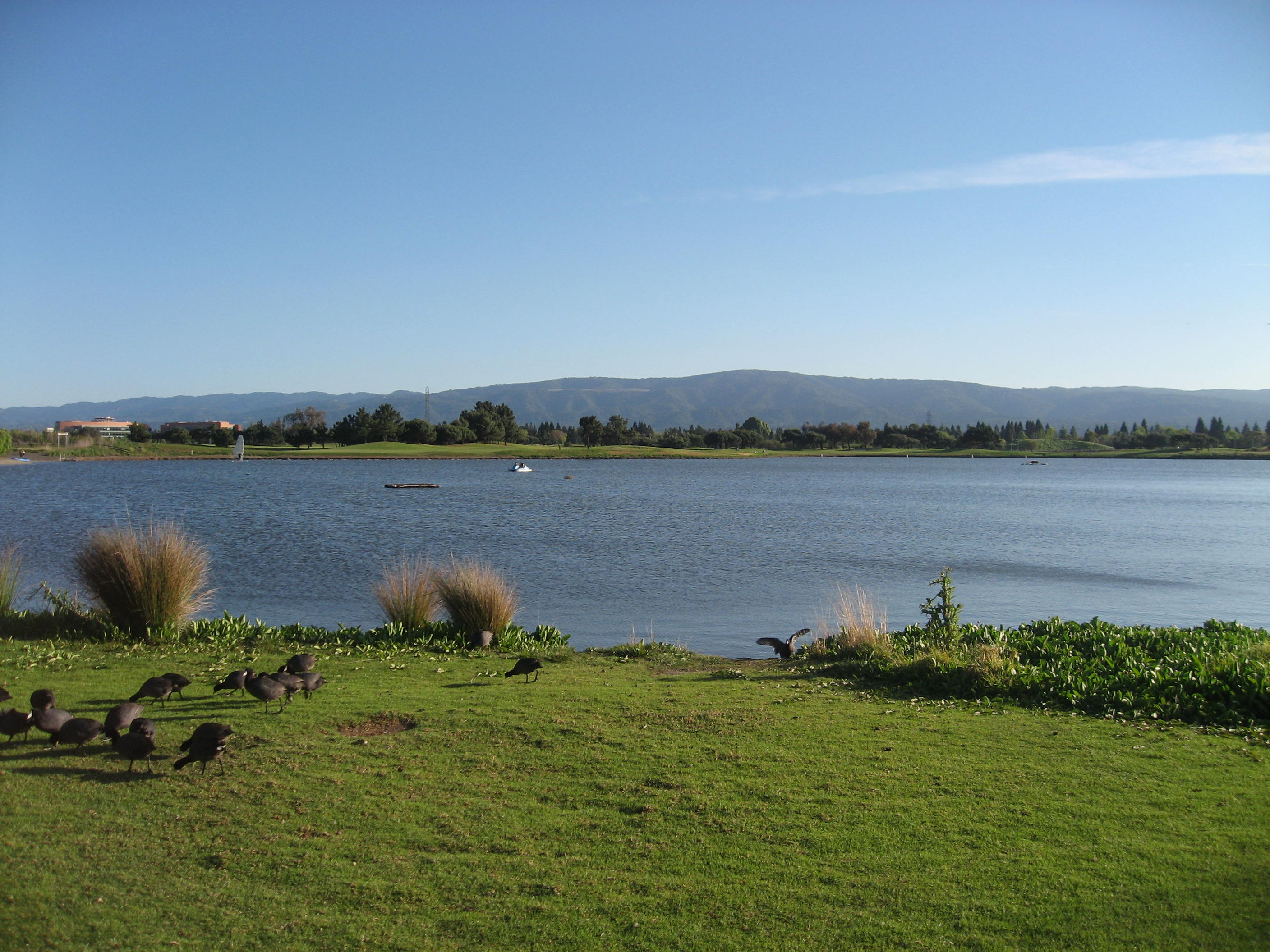
Portion of lake used for Shoreline Aquatic Center rentals and classes
