= Species of special concern =

Species of special concern may refer to:

- California species of special concern
- The Canadian Species at Risk Act

== See also ==
- Species of concern
