= Monte Bello Open Space Preserve =

Coordinates: 37.31°N 122.15°W

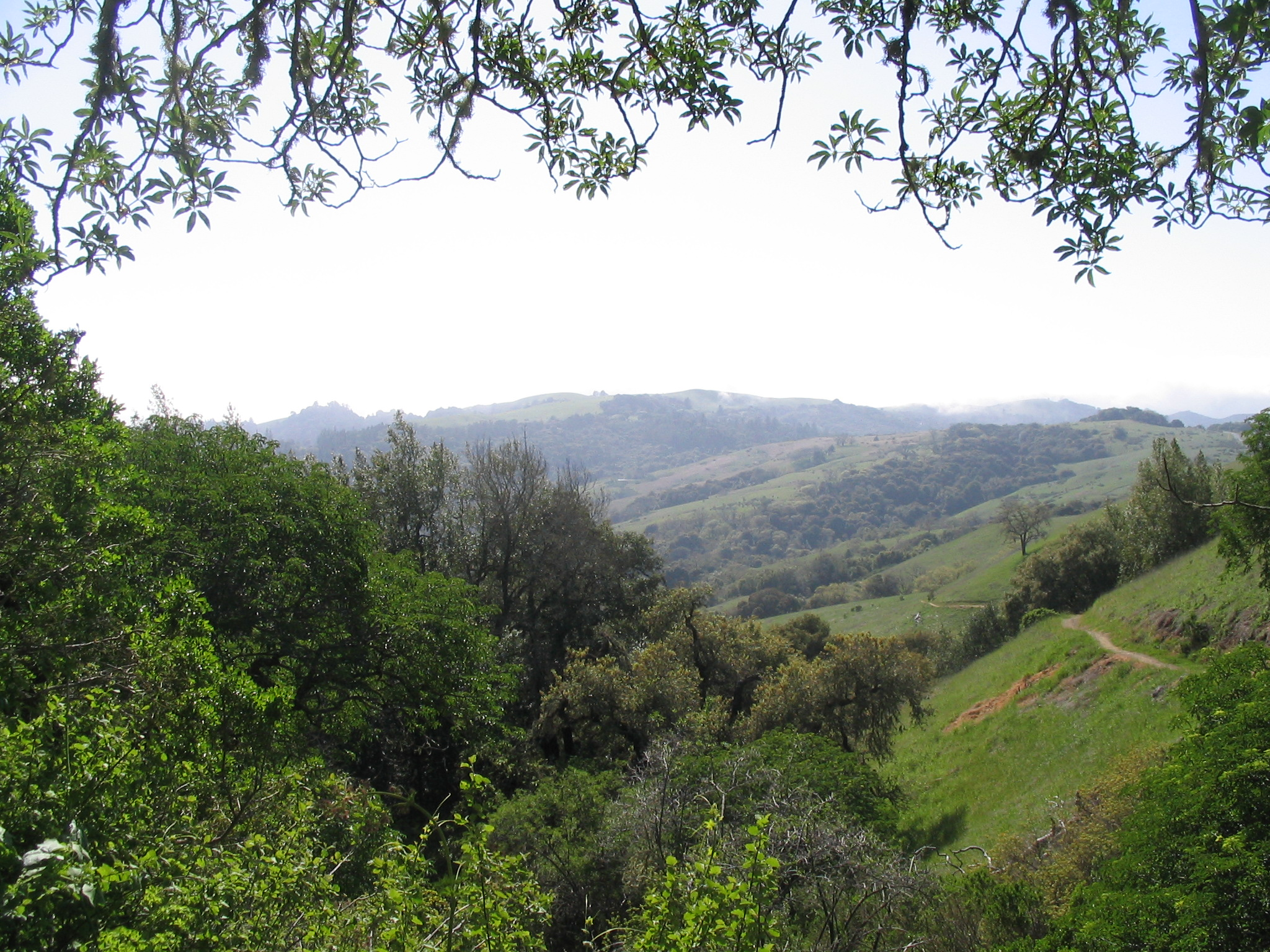
Looking back along Bella Vista Trail in Monte Bello Open Space Preserve at the varying types of vegetation in the upper Stevens Creek valley, in the hills west of Palo Alto, CA.

Monte Bello Open Space Preserve is a 3,133-acre (12.68 km^{2}) open space preserve, located near Palo Alto in the Santa Cruz Mountains, in San Mateo and Santa Clara Counties, California, United States. The preserve encompasses the upper Stevens Creek watershed in the valley between Monte Bello Ridge and Skyline Ridge. "Monte Bello" means "beautiful mountain" in Italian, and refers to Black Mountain which is the highest part of Montebello Ridge. The straight valley of upper Stevens Creek is also the rift valley of the San Andreas Fault.

== History ==
After extensive logging operations in the nineteenth century, Italian farmers and winemakers settled on the flanks of Montebello Ridge. Dairies in the Santa Cruz Mountains supplied much of the milk for San Francisco and the San Francisco Peninsula. There was a large dairy near what is now the preserve's main parking area on Page Mill Road, and cattle freely grazed the slopes of Monte Bello Ridge. Ranch buildings dotted the landscape.

George Morell, founding publisher of the Palo Alto Times and a Trustee of Stanford University, bought the Black Mountain Ranch property in 1940. "Nature in the raw" is what led Mr. Morell to buy Black Mountain Ranch, according to his essay, "History of Black Mountain and Monte Bello Ridge," written in 1959. Morell donated the land comprising the former Johnson, Winship, Morell ranches to Stanford University.

When the preserve lands were acquired by the Midpeninsula Regional Open Space District (MROSD) from Stanford in 1975, a commune of about 100 people, called "The Land" were evicted. The Land lived along the Canyon Trail from Page Mill Road to Indian Creek and built a variety of dwellings on platforms scattered amongst the oak woodlands and secluded canyons. A large ranch building was used as a central dining hall, and maintained a woodworking shop, a stained-glass workshop, and a food store selling bulk items. Commune members grew their own food in gardens, engaged in artistic pursuits, and gathered for holiday dinners and celebrations.

== Habitat and wildlife ==
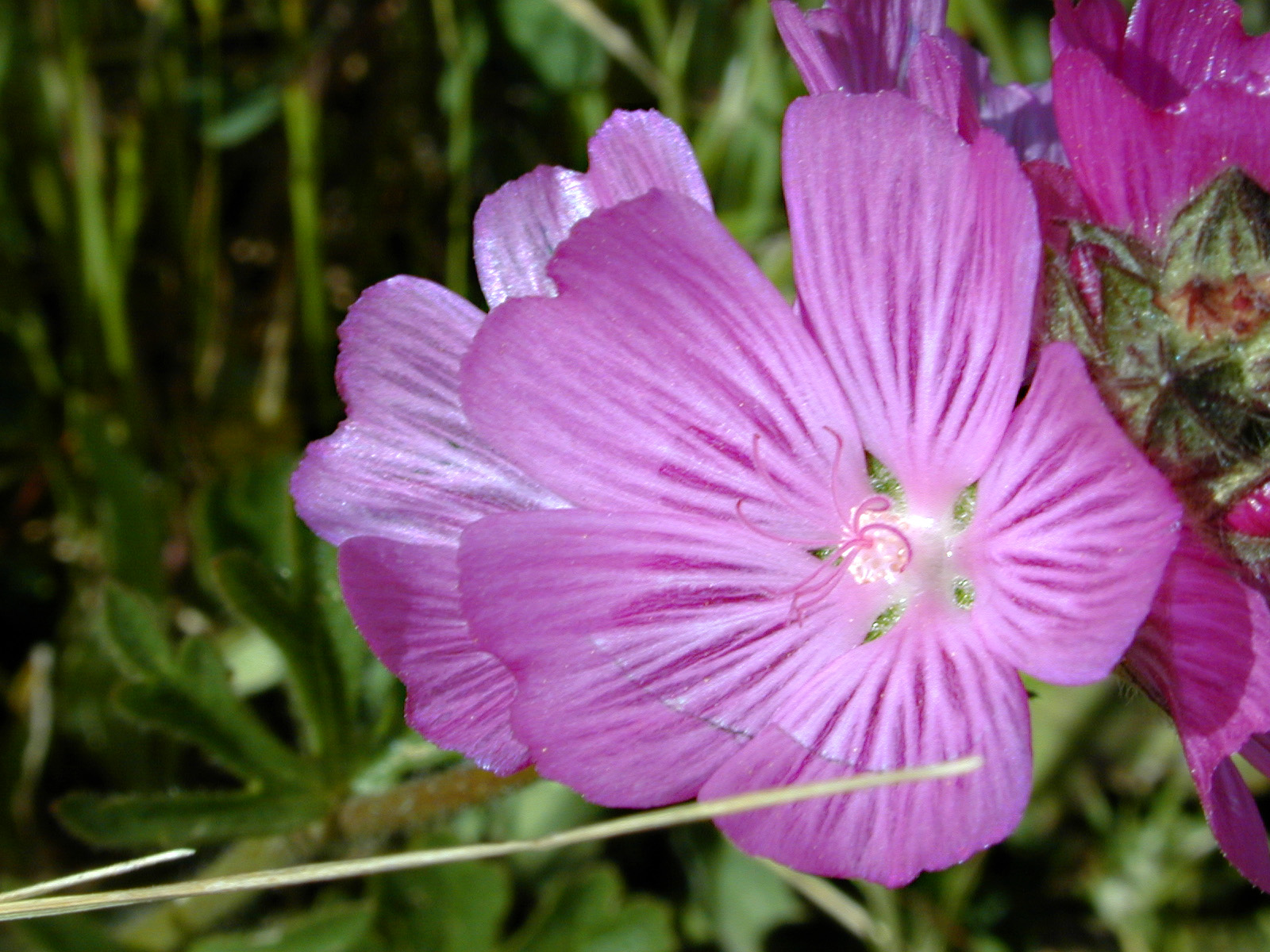
Sidalcea malviflora in the Preserve

Evidence of a large historic Coast Douglas-fir (Pseudotsuga menziesii var. menziesii) forest includes the "Skid Road Trail", which was once traversed by 19th-century loggers who used oxen to drag huge firs and smaller Tanbark oak (Lithocarpus densiflorus) trees along "skids" which were flat-topped logs doused with water to reduce friction. Today, seedlings sown by second growth Douglas-fir forest can be seen advancing up into the preserve's grasslands in an example of forest succession.

The preserve's grasslands include California poppy, checker mallow, purple owl's-clover, bluedicks, and blue-eyed grass. Large mammals in the preserve include coyote, bobcat, deer, badger and mountain lions. Common raptors include red-tailed hawks, northern harriers, and American kestrels, and less commonly, rough-legged hawks, prairie falcons, merlins, and golden eagles can be seen during fall and spring migratory seasons. Monte Bello hosts a wide variety of owl species, including great horned, barn, pygmy, long-eared, western screech, and northern saw-whet. Secretive Virginia rails (Rallus limicola) inhabit the sag pond at the beginning of the Canyon Trail.

== Hiking and recreation ==
The Preserve connects upper Stevens Creek County Park with Skyline Ridge Open Space Preserve, Los Trancos Open Space Preserve, and Rancho San Antonio Open Space Preserve, enabling many different long hike combinations. Monte Bello boasts grassland, Douglas fir, live oak, and California bay forests, an excellent riparian corridor, great views, and a backpack camp. The preserve contains about 15.5 miles (24.9 km) of hiking trails, including some that are wheelchair accessible.

The Canyon Trail leads through a grove of English walnuts from the Preserve entrance on Page Mill Road, to a sag pond formed by faults and fed by a spring on Monte Bello Ridge.

The Stevens Creek Nature Trail, with a self-guided 3-mile (4.8 km) loop with interpretation, which descends into the forested canyon, continues along the creek, and heads back up through grasslands.

The Black Mountain Backpack Camp, the only campsite on Midpeninsula Regional Open Space District lands, provides visitors with a camping experience just one half-hour away by car from the cities below. The camp is a 1.5-mile (2.4 km) hike from Page Mill Road, including a 500-foot (150 m) uphill climb from the parking lot. There are bathrooms but no potable water. A permit is required but this camp makes it possible to take a multi-day hike from the Santa Clara Valley to the coast.

The Preserve features excellent mountain biking including a descent from the preserve's main entrance on Page Mill Road via the Canyon Trail to Stevens Creek Road and ultimately, Stevens Creek Reservoir. Alternatively several trails climb to the top of 2,800-foot (850 m) Black Mountain.

The preserve's main entrance is on Page Mill Road, 7 miles (11 km) west of Highway 280 and 1.5 miles (2.4 km) east of Skyline Boulevard. Parking is available for 45 cars. Additional parking is available at the Los Trancos Open Space Preserve parking area, located directly across Page Mill Road.

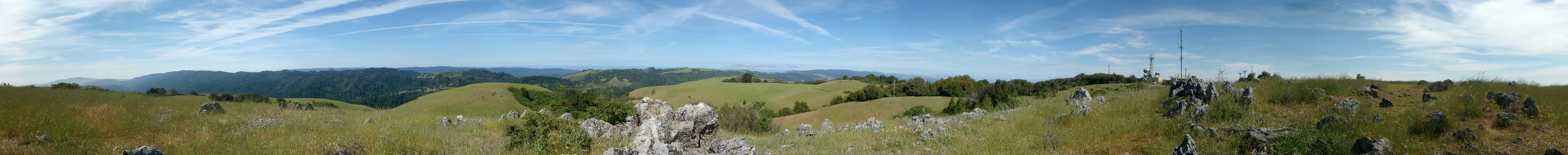
Panorama from summit of Black Mountain
