= Santa Clara valley aquifer =

Aquifer under the San Francisco Bay area

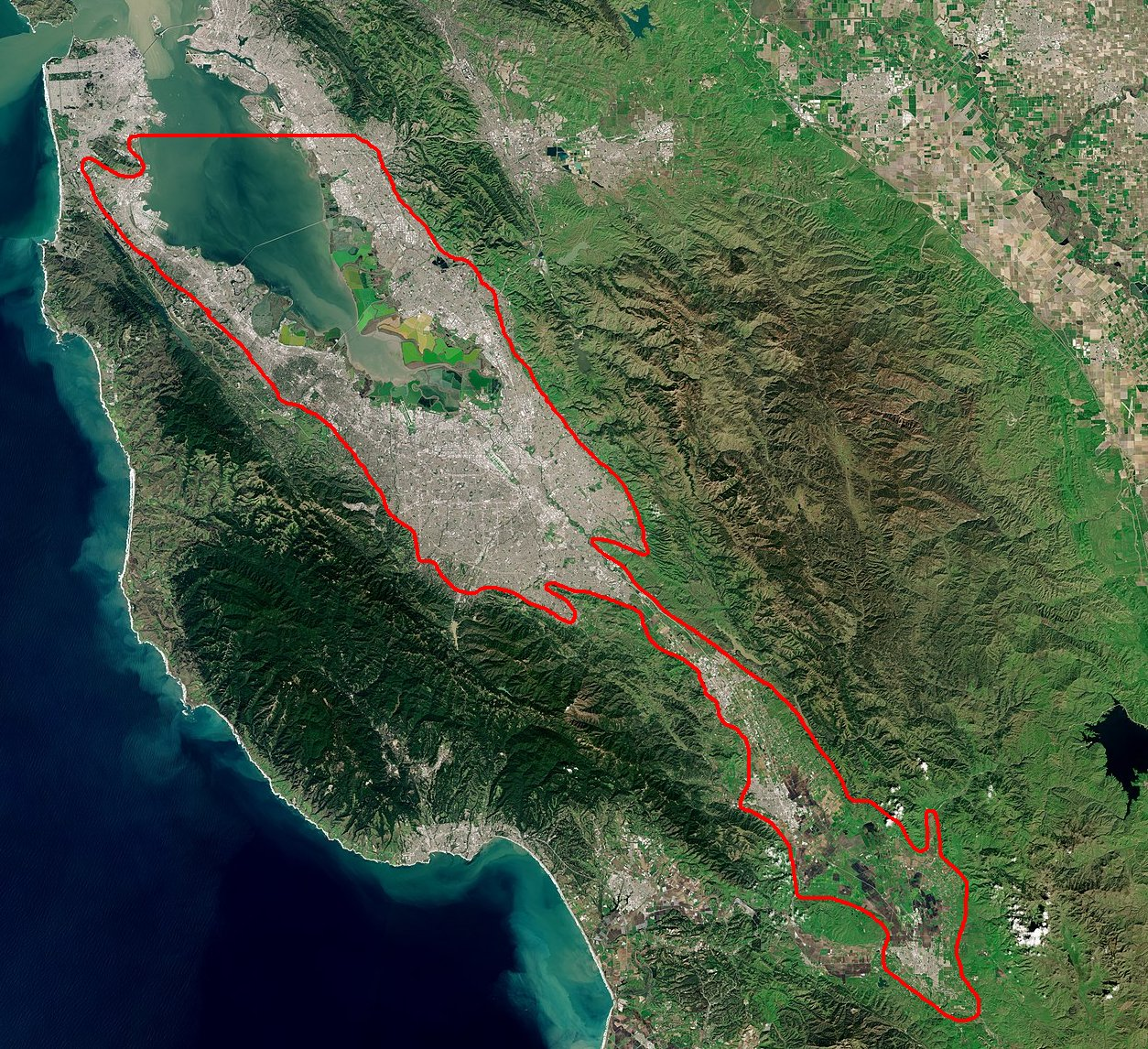
Overview of the valley

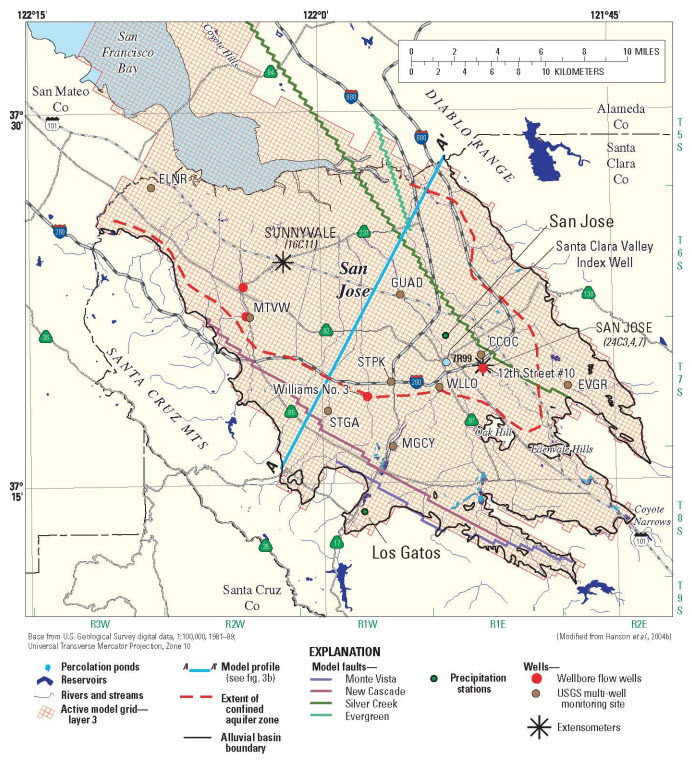
Santa Clara valley aquifer

The Santa Clara valley aquifer is a groundwater aquifer located in the southern San Francisco Bay Area. The geology of the Santa Clara valley aquifer consists of a complex stratigraphy of permeable and impermeable units. Management of aquifer resources is associated with the Santa Clara Valley Water District.

== History ==
In the early parts of the 20th century, the Santa Clara Valley was a vegetable and fruit growing region. Ground water was pumped heavily, leading to the Santa Clara valley being the first region recognized to be affected by land subsidence in the 1940s. Between 1912 and 1966, artesian pressure levels dropped more than 200 feet (61 m). The decreasing pressure heads resulted in land subsidence of up to 15 feet (4.6 m). The Santa Clara Valley Water District and other water purveyors have work to refined management practices which have halted land subsidence. During the 1960s due to the substantial decrease in ground water the SCVWD began to import surface water. The Central Valley Project and the California State Water Project provide the surface water which has been beneficial to the region.

== Hydrogeological framework ==
The groundwater aquifer can be separated into two major regions: the Upper and Lower Aquifers. The alluvial boundary which surrounds the valley allows for water to permeate through the ground which then flows horizontally into the confined region of the aquifer. This system creates a convergent flow within the area which is bound by the topography of the region. The faults in the region also play a role in how groundwater is controlled, which furthermore subdivides the aquifer into three subregions. The hydrogeology of the aquifer has been significantly altered by surface water, which is treated and recharged to the aquifer while also providing water to local users.

=== Hydrogeological structure ===
Well core data indicate that the Santa Clara Valley Aquifer consists of between four and six different water-bearing units. The aquifer is composed of both confined and unconfined units. Water-bearing units are generally coarse-grained and separated by relatively fine-grained units. The thicknesses of coarse-grained sections vary between 10–25 feet (3.0–7.6 m) in the southeast and between 50–200 feet (15–61 m) in the south-central and southwestern areas of the valley. Temperature data from monitoring wells indicate that horizontal groundwater flow occurs primarily above 775 feet (236 m) in southern-central regions and above 510 feet (160 m) in southeastern areas. Faults also play a big role in how water is controlled; depending on the sediments' permeability, the Silver Creek fault creates seasonal subsidence or uplift on the west side or long term uplift on the east side. The uplift has been associated with the dam on the eastern side of the Valley.

=== Land Subsidence ===
Subsidence has been a key issue in the region, which led to 17 square miles (44 km^{2}) of dry land to sink beneath high tide levels in the 1969; this region was adjacent to the San Francisco Bay. The region is now heavily rigged with ring dikes and control levees, which work as flood control and prevent saltwater intrusion. Land subsidence created a need for controlling stream channels to ensure that water flowed into the Bay. The majority of land subsidence has occurred in the confined region of the aquifer.

==== Land Uplift ====
The effort conducted in the valley to halt subsidence resulted in uplift from 1992 to 1998: the mean uplift surveyed was 6.4 ± 2.2 mm/yr, which was noted in Sunnyvale and eastern San Jose. However, there is still a lot of land deformation from subsidence, but not notable from fault movement. The majority of notable uplift has been noted to be in the southernmost region of the confined zone of the aquifer, which has been seen as seasonal.

== Management ==
Decades of ground water depletion due to urban development and agriculture resulted in substantial land subsidence. The Santa Clara Valley Water District and other water purveyors have replenished ground water levels by artificial recharge, which is occurring in the upper 500 feet (150 m) of the upper aquifer.

=== Artificial Recharge ===
Percolation ponds were built in the margins of the Santa Clara Valley to help increase the rate of recharge with rainfall runoff. However, the percolation ponds did not produce any uplift, due to the compacted interbeds of the upper aquifer. Recharge wells pump treated water into the confined region of the aquifer, which has produced uplift.

== Water quality ==
The quality of the groundwater is considered "good", but if the demand for ground water exceeds the amount replenished, then there would be increased the risk of seawater intrusion, which may degrade the water quality. The characteristic of the water is identified to be calcium bicarbonate, which occurs in the region of 200 feet (61 m) and above the subsurface, while in-between 200–1,000 feet (61–305 m), it is sodium bicarbonate.
