= Black Mountain (near Los Altos, California) =

Mountain in Santa Clara County, California

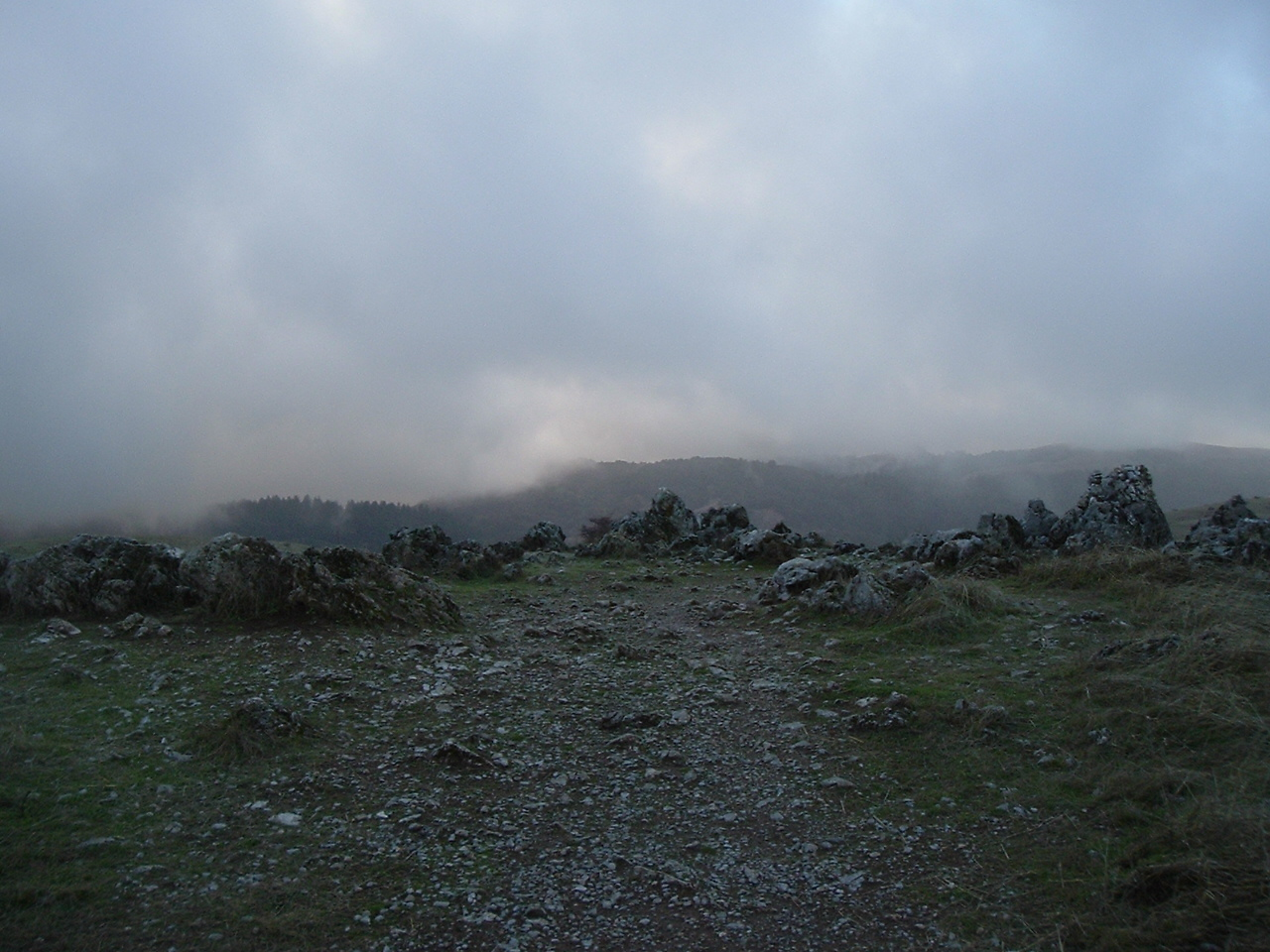
- View of the Santa Cruz Mountains from the summit of Black Mountain on a cloudy day

Highest point
- Elevation: 2,812 ft (857 m) NAVD 88
- Coordinates: 37°19′08″N 122°08′51″W

Geography
- Location: Santa Clara County, California; United States
- Parent range: Santa Cruz Mountains
- Topo map: USGS Mindego Hill

Black Mountain is a summit on Monte Bello Ridge in the Santa Cruz Mountains of west Santa Clara County, California, south of Los Altos and Los Altos Hills, and west of Cupertino; it is within the Palo Alto city limits though not near the developed part of the city. It is located on the border between Rancho San Antonio Open Space Preserve and Monte Bello Open Space Preserve, with the summit located in the former. Early Spanish explorers commonly named tree- or chaparral-covered summits which look black in the distance Loma Prieta, from the Spanish (loma-hill, prieta-dark). The Spanish also called the middle portion of the Santa Cruz Mountains the Sierra Morena meaning (morena-brunette, sierra-mountain range), extending from Half Moon Bay Road (California State Route 92) south to a gap at Lexington Reservoir, and which includes a summit called Sierra Morena. There are over 100 "Black Mountains" in California.

== History ==
After extensive logging operations in the nineteenth century, Italian farmers and winemakers settled on the flanks of Montebello Ridge. Dairies in the Santa Cruz Mountains supplied much of the milk for San Francisco and the Peninsula. There was a large dairy near what is now the Montebello Open Space Preserve's main parking area on Page Mill Road, and cattle freely grazed the slopes of Black Mountain. Ranch buildings dotted the landscape.

Oseo Perrone, a physician and immigrant from Mattarana, La Spezia Province, Italy, came to San Francisco in 1881, became interested in viticulture and purchased a large ranch at 2,600 feet (790 m) on Black Mountain in 1885 where he, and then his nephew of the same name, began production of Montebello Winery (now Ridge Vineyards) wine in 1892.

George Morell, founding publisher of the Palo Alto Times and a Trustee of Stanford University, bought the Black Mountain Ranch on the mountain's summit in 1940. "Nature in the raw" is what led Mr. Morell to buy Black Mountain Ranch, according to his essay, "History of Black Mountain and Monte Bello Ridge," written in 1959. Morell donated the land comprising the former Johnson, Winship, Morell ranches to Stanford University.

In 1975, when the Black Mountain Ranch lands were acquired by the Midpeninsula Regional Open Space District (MROSD) from Stanford, a commune of about 100 people, called "The Land", were evicted. The Land lived along the Canyon Trail from Page Mill Road to Indian Creek and built a variety of dwellings on platforms scattered amongst the oak woodlands and secluded canyons. A large ranch building was used as a central dining hall, and maintained a woodworking shop, a stained-glass workshop, and a food store selling bulk items. Commune members grew their own food in gardens, engaged in artistic pursuits, and gathered for holiday dinners and celebrations.

Three creeks, each with an interesting history, spring from Black Mountain and flow to southwest San Francisco Bay.

Stevens Creek originates in the Montebello Open Space Preserve on the west flank of the mountain and flows southeast then north to the Bay. Stevens Creek was originally called Arroyo San José de Cupertino by Spanish explorer Juan Bautista de Anza, who camped along the creek on his expedition from Monterey to San Francisco. Anza completed the first overland route to San Francisco Bay when he and Father Pedro Font sighted the bay from a prominent knoll near the entry of Rancho San Antonio County Park. In Anza's diary on March 25, 1776, he states that he "arrived at the "Arroyo San José de Cupertino", which is useful only for travelers. Here we halted for the night, having come eight leagues in seven and a half hours. From this place we have seen at our right the estuary which runs from the port of San Francisco." The Arroyo San José de Cupertino became Cupertino Creek, but was later re-named for Elijah Stephens (how his name was misspelled is unknown), a South Carolina-born blacksmith and trapper who settled on Cupertino Creek in 1848. Stephens renamed his 160-acre (65 ha) property at the base of Black Mountain "Blackberry Farm". Stephens is notable for being the captain of the Stephens-Townsend-Murphy Party, the first wagon train to cross the Sierra Nevada (two years before the ill-fated Donner Party).

Adobe Creek, originally named Yeguas Creek then San Antonio Creek, flows down Black Mountain's north flank to the Bay at the Palo Alto Flood Basin, just west of the Bay Trail on the levee separating it from Charleston Slough. The founders of Adobe Systems, a software company, lived next to Adobe Creek in Los Altos, and named their company after the creek. The upper watershed of Adobe Creek is protected by the Hidden Villa, a nonprofit educational organization founded by Frank and Josephine Duveneck, who purchased the land in 1924 and offered it as a gathering place for discussion, reflection, and incubation of social reform. Over the following decades, the Duvenecks established the first Hostel on the Pacific Coast (1937), the first multiracial summer camp (1945), and Hidden Villa's Environmental Education Program (1970).

Permanente Creek, named Río Permanente by early Spanish explorers because of its perennial flow, descends the east flank of Black Mountain then courses north to the Bay at the Mountain View Slough. Permanente Creek is also the namesake for Kaiser Permanente. Bess Kaiser and her spouse, industrialist Henry Kaiser, had a lodge on the creek's headwaters above the large Permanente Quarry and Cement Plant, and, in 1945, Bess felt that the name of their attractive and dependable stream would be a good name for their medical program at the shipyards. That medical program became Kaiser Permanente.

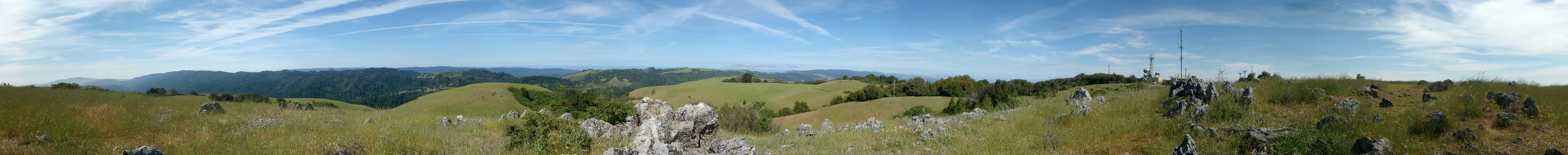
Panorama from the summit of Black Mountain

== Habitat and wildlife ==
Rainfall on the summit of Black Mountain averages 40 inches (1.0 m) per year, much higher than the Santa Clara Valley which lies in its rain shadow.

From its name, Black Mountain's dark summit was once covered with forest or chaparral instead of the current grasslands. Evidence of a large historic Coast Douglas-fir (Pseudotsuga menziesii var. menziesii) forest includes the "Skid Road Trail" in the Stevens Creek valley west of Black Mountain. Nineteenth century loggers used oxen to drag huge firs and smaller Tanbark oak (Lithocarpus densiflorus) trees along the trail. "Skids" were flat-topped logs doused with water to reduce friction. Although the summit today is mostly grassland and oak, the Stevens Creek valley contains the last remaining Douglas-fir forest in Santa Clara County. Until the 1975 conversion of Black Mountain to open space by the Midpeninsula Regional Open Space District, forest succession was inhibited by grazing dairy cattle. Today, saplings sown by large remnant Douglas-fir trees are distributed widely over the mountain in an example of forest succession.

The Monte Bello ridge's grasslands include California poppy, checker mallow, purple owl's-clover, bluedicks, and blue-eyed grass. Large mammals on the ridge include coyotes, bobcats, deer, badgers and mountain lions. Common raptors include red-tailed hawks, northern harriers, and American kestrels, and less commonly, rough-legged hawks, prairie falcons, merlins, and golden eagles can be seen during fall and spring migratory seasons. Monte Bello hosts a wide variety of owl species, including great horned, barn, pygmy, long-eared, western screech, and northern saw-whet. Secretive Virginia rails (Rallus limicola) inhabit the sag pond at the beginning of the Canyon Trail.

== Geology ==
The geology of the mountain is complex and has features different from the rest of the Santa Cruz Mountains. The San Andreas Fault runs along the base of Monte Bello Ridge, of which Black Mountain is the highest point at 2,812 feet (857 m). It is the second highest summit on the Sierra Morena portion of the Santa Cruz Mountains, after Castle Rock at 3,214 feet (980 m). Everything west of the San Andreas fault rides to the northwest on the Pacific Plate's Salinian Block, which is made up largely of Mesozoic-era granitic rocks, similar to those of the Sierra Nevada, and overlain by more recent sedimentary rocks of marine origin. East of the fault, the North American Plate rides to the southeast, and here the bedrock is the Franciscan Assemblage, made up of rocks common in the Bay Area such as sandstone, basalt, and metamorphics. On the very summit of Black Mountain are Calera limestone rocks which are relatively unique in the Bay Area. Microfossils in the limestone deposits suggest that the mountain originated as a seamount at 22 degrees north in the tropical Pacific about 100 million years ago (early Aptian to late Turonian) and was transported to Los Altos by the Pacific Plate. These rocks occur as jagged gray boulders and outcrops just southwest of the radio towers on the summit, as well as in the large Permanente Quarry downhill east of the preserve where the limestone is mined to produce cement. Calera is the Spanish word for 'limekiln', reflecting how limestone was burned historically to produce lime, a key ingredient for mortar. The summit is also unusual as it is higher than the Skyline Ridge to the west, allowing a view of the ocean on a clear day.

Small quantities of gold and mercury have been mined from the mountain. Legend has it that a lone Indian eked out a living on gold extracted from a "lost mine". The location has since been lost.

== Black Mountain today ==
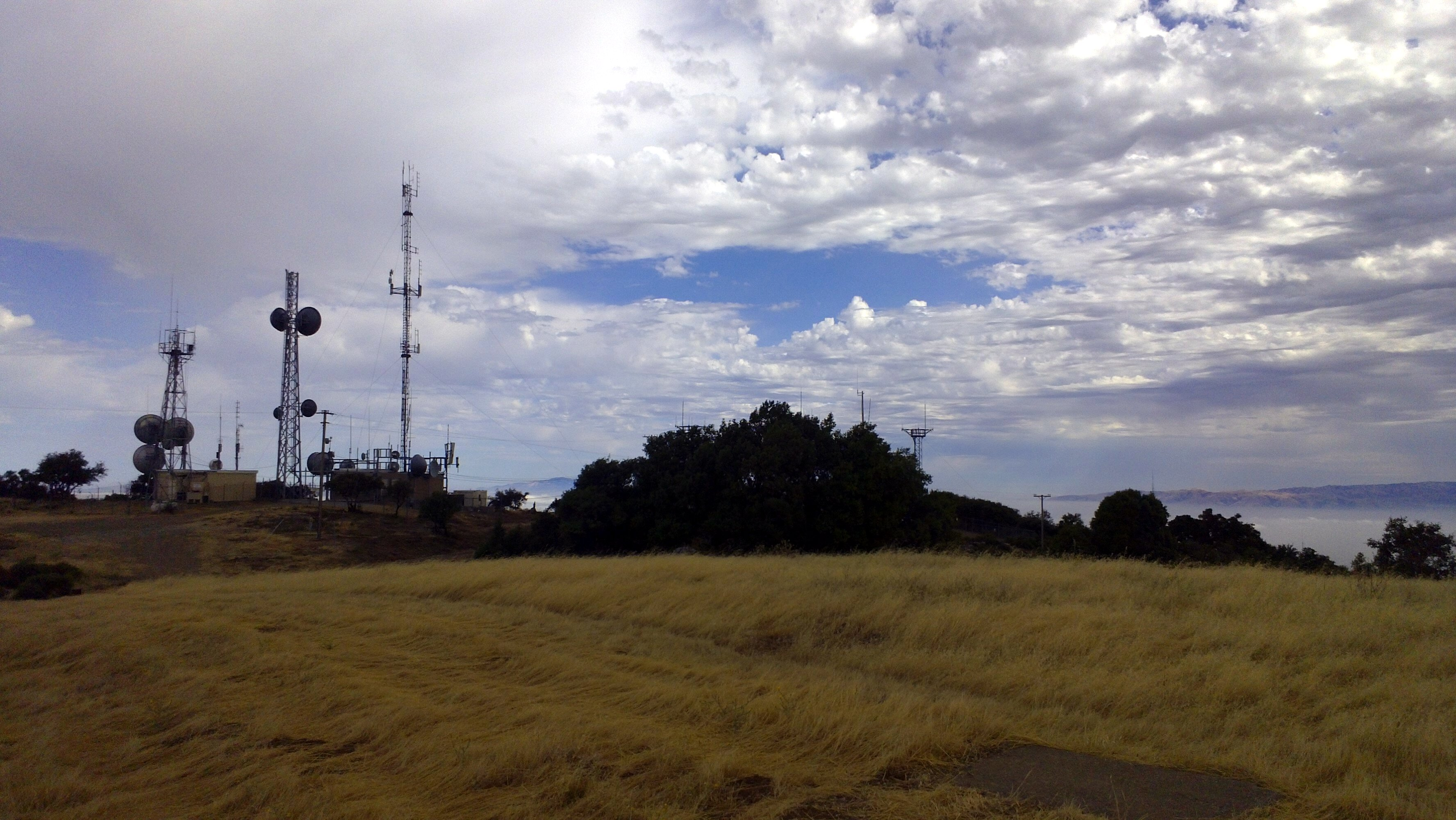
View from the highest point of the trail connecting Montebello Road and Page Mill Road.

The mountain is a popular destination for hikers and mountain bikers. The summit is most easily accessed from the Monte Bello parking area on Page Mill Road, via a 2.5-mile (4.0 km) route from about 2,200 feet (670 m). The summit can also be reached from the northwestern entrance of Rancho San Antonio on Rhus Ridge Road in Los Altos Hills by a 5 miles (8.0 km) route from about 400-foot (120 m). This strenuous hike is not recommended for novice or beginning hikers.

The summit can also be reached by Montebello Road which begins near the Stevens Creek Reservoir. This maintained road can be followed most of the way to the summit. It has an average grade of 8.1% on the paved portion, and while it is open to motor vehicles the traffic is comparatively light. On the summit there are three broadcasting stations. One is a private radio station owned by Stanford University, another is owned by the Federal Aviation Administration, and Foothill College's radio station, KFJC, also broadcasts from there

There are several wineries along Montebello Road, including Ridge Vineyards, Fellom Ranch Vineyards and Picchetti Brothers Winery.

== See also ==
- Adobe Creek (near Los Altos, California)
- Permanente Creek
- Stevens Creek (California)
