= Stevens Creek Reservoir =

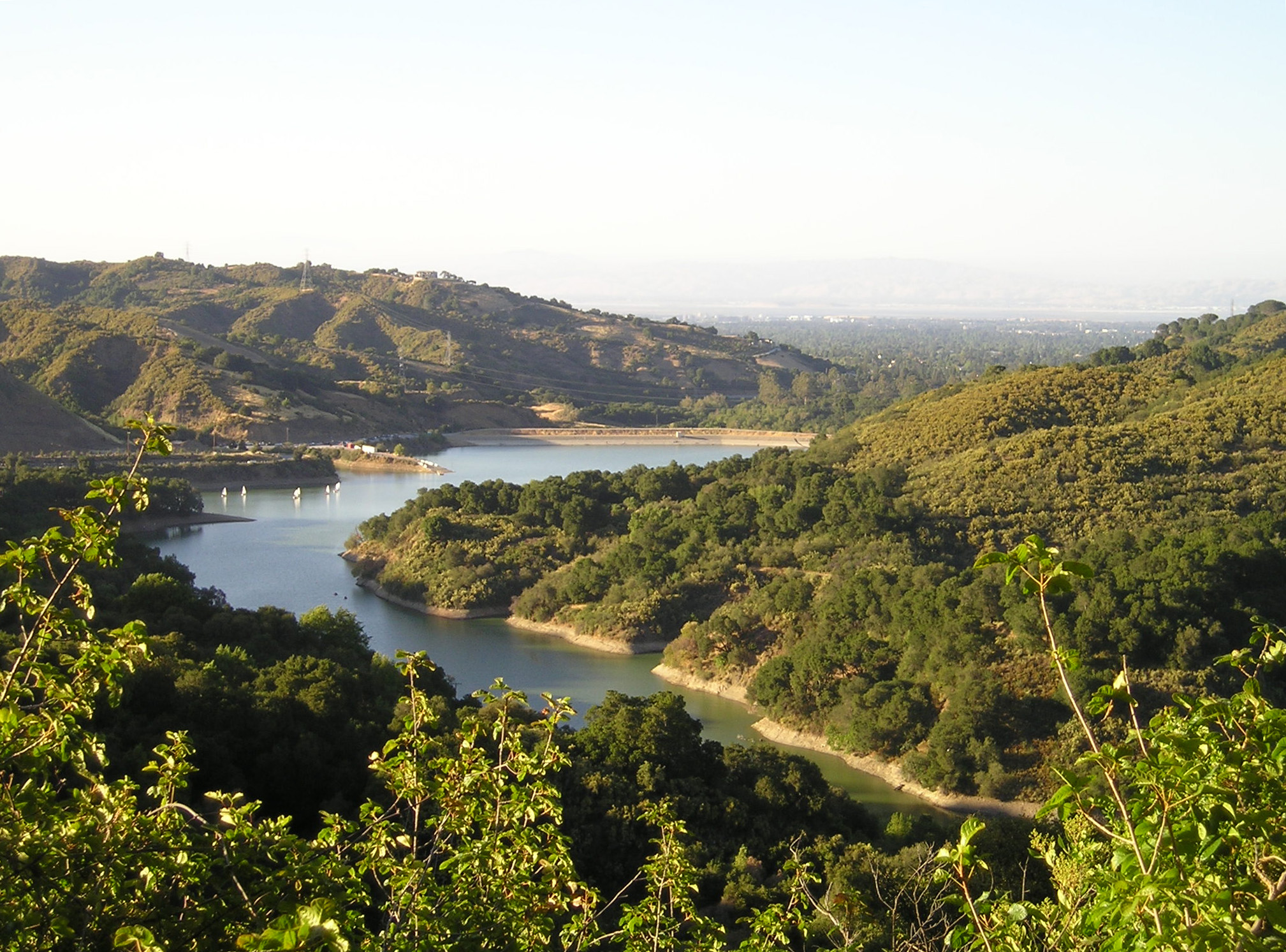
- View from Zinfandel Trail, June 2008

- Location within California Location within the United States
- Location: Santa Clara County, California
- Coordinates: 37°17′38″N 122°04′47″W
- Type: Reservoir
- Primary inflows: Stevens Creek
- Primary outflows: Stevens Creek
- Catchment area: 17.5 sq mi (45 km^{2})
- Basin countries: United States
- Managing agency: Santa Clara Valley Water District
- Surface area: 92 acres (37 ha)
- Water volume: 3,138 acre⋅ft (3,871,000 m^{3})
- Settlements: none

Stevens Creek Reservoir is an artificial lake located in the foothills of the Santa Cruz Mountains near Cupertino, California. A 1,063-acre (430 ha) county park surrounds the reservoir and provides limited fishing ("catch and release"), picnicking, hiking, and horseback riding activities. Although swimming is not allowed, non-power boating (such as by kayak) is allowed for certain parts of the year. No powered boats or jet skis are allowed. All vessels must be inspected for invasive Quagga mussels prior to launch.

The California Office of Environmental Health Hazard Assessment has issued a safe eating advisory for any fish caught in Stevens Creek Reservoir due to elevated levels of mercury.

== History ==
The reservoir was formed by the Stevens Creek Dam, built in 1935 (91 years ago) across Stevens Creek. It is one of the smaller reservoirs owned by the Santa Clara Valley Water District.

Originally named Arroyo de San José Cupertino, Stevens Creek flows into the reservoir and out of the dam to San Francisco Bay. Stevens Creek and the reservoir are named after Captain Elijah Stephens, who led the first wagon train across the Sierra Nevada in 1844 and settled in Cupertino.

== Stevens Creek Dam ==
Stevens Creek Dam is an earthen dam 132 feet (40 m) high and 1,080 feet (330 m) long. Its crest is 554 feet (169 m) above sea level. In 1985, the dam's height was raised 10 feet (3.0 m) to its present height with the addition of 231,000 cubic yards (177,000 m^{3}) of material.

== Stevens Creek County Park ==
Stevens Creek County Park is one of 28 Santa Clara County Parks. The 1,063-acre (430 ha) park surrounds the reservoir, with the Picchetti Ranch Open Space Preserve adjacent to its east on the Montebello Ridge (also known as Black Mountain). An entrance to the park lies three miles from Interstate 280. Six miles of trails connect with the Midpeninsula Regional Open Space District's Fremont Older Open Space Preserve.

=== Fishing ===
Bluegill, koi, common carp, largemouth bass, crappie, white catfish, native landlocked steelhead, and other species of fish live in the reservoir. A few illegally stocked white sturgeon have even been caught as recently as 2021, including one weighing over 50lbs in 2010. It can be fished only with a permit unless under the age of 16.

While regulations permit the taking of fish, DFW recommends catch and release because of problems with the concentration of mercury and PCBs in the water. The reservoir was historically stocked with farmed rainbow trout for recreational purposes, but this practice was discontinued after elevated levels of methylmercury were assessed. Fishing for trout at the reservoir is frowned upon since holdovers are likely endangered native steelhead.

== See also ==
- List of dams and reservoirs in California
- List of lakes in California
- List of lakes in the San Francisco Bay Area
