= California species of special concern =

Legal protective designation for at-risk wildlife in the state of California

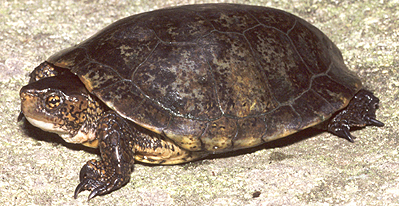
The western pond turtle is a species of special concern.

A species of special concern is a legal designation by the California Department of Fish and Wildlife for native wildlife facing significant risks. This label is applied to species that:

1. Have vanished from California, or for birds, no longer play their primary roles in the ecosystem
2. Are deemed threatened or endangered under the Federal Endangered Species Act but lack state listing
3. Meet the state Endangered Species Act criteria for threatened or endangered status but await formal listing
4. Have experienced or are currently undergoing substantial declines in population or habitat range, potentially leading to consideration for threatened or endangered status under the state Endangered Species Act if these declines persist
5. Possess naturally small populations that are exposed to various threats, such as habitat loss or human interference, which could result in declines meeting the criteria for threatened or endangered status under the state Endangered Species Act

== Definitions from the California Department of Fish and Wildlife ==
"Species of special concern" is a designation given to animals that are not categorized under the California Endangered Species Act, however they are still (1) exhibiting a declining population that may suggest a future listing, or (2) have historically low numbers partially due to ongoing threats to their existence. To be listed as a species of special concern, it must meet one or more of the following criteria:

1. Reside in small, isolated populations or in fragmented habitat, resulting in further isolation or population decline
2. Exhibit significant decline in population. A majority of taxa do not have population information available. Species that are still abundant, even if they exhibit population decline, do not meet the species of special concern requirements, whereas uncommon and rare species do.
3. Rely on a habitat that has undergone significant historical or recent decline in size, affecting the species ability to thrive. Examples of California habitats that have experienced substantial reductions in recent history include coastal wetlands, particularly in the urbanized San Francisco Bay and south-coastal areas, alluvial fan sage scrub and coastal sage scrub in the southern coastal basins, and arid scrub in the San Joaquin Valley
4. Occupy areas where habitat conversion to incompatible land uses threatens their survival
5. Have limited California records or historical presence without recent sightings
6. Primarily inhabit public lands, experience challenges due to management practices that impact the animal's persistence

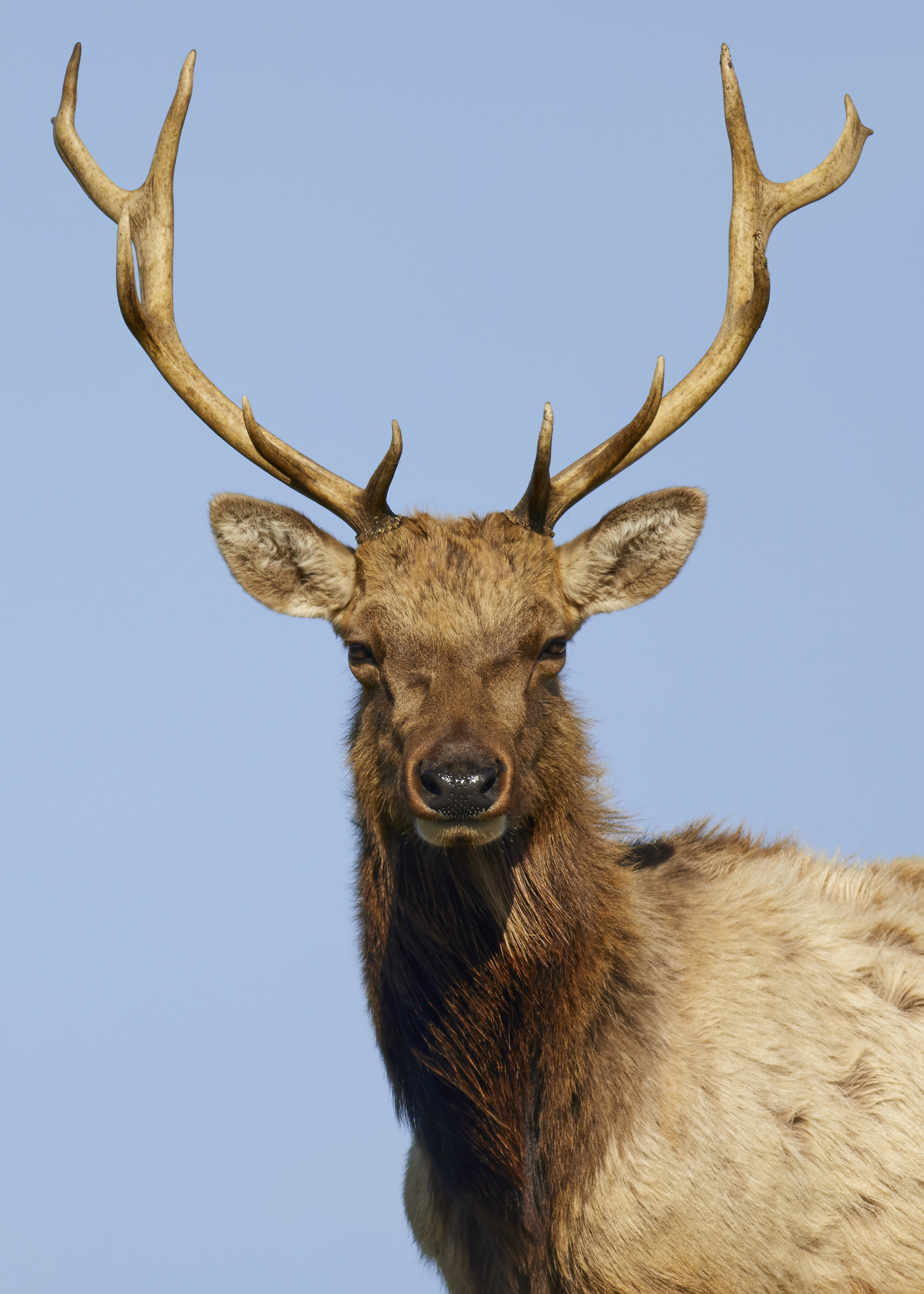
The Tule elk is listed as a species of special concern by the California Department of Fish and Wildlife.

== Purpose ==
The categorization of a species as a Species of Special Concern is intended to result in enhanced consideration for these animals by agencies involved in the environment, such as California Department of Fish and Wildlife, land managers, consulting biologists, and others. This designation is intended to avoid the need for costly listings under State endangered species laws and the subsequent recovery efforts. Additionally, this designation has the intended purpose of encouraging the collection of additional information on these species' biology, distribution, and status while directing management and research efforts towards their conservation.

The California Department of Fish and Wildlife should consider species of special concern during any of the following processes: (1) the environmental review process, (2) conservation planning process, (3) the preparation of management plans for California Department of Fish and Wildlife lands, or (4) inventories, surveys, and monitoring (conducted either by the California Department of Fish and Wildlife or others with whom they are cooperating).

== Designation process ==
The California Bird Species of Special Concern document (Shuford and Gardali 2008) outlines the state's preferred process for designating species. This methodology has been developed through collaboration between the California Department of Fish and Wildlife and the scientific community. Steps in the process of designation include:

1. Maintain consistency by ensuring a unified definition of species of special concern across different taxonomic groups
2. Establish a technical advisory group composed of biology experts who are knowledgeable on the taxonomic group's status
3. Develop a list of taxa with potential for species of special concern nomination through an open, collaborative process
4. Apply relevant metrics established by the technical advisory group to assess the status of the taxon
5. Include federally-listed taxa automatically
6. Exclude State-listed taxa autonomically
7. Use a ranking scheme to develop conservation priorities
8. Offer an explanation for taxa that was previously designated as species of special concern but has been omitted from the revised list
