= Los Altos Hills, California =

City in California, United States

- Town
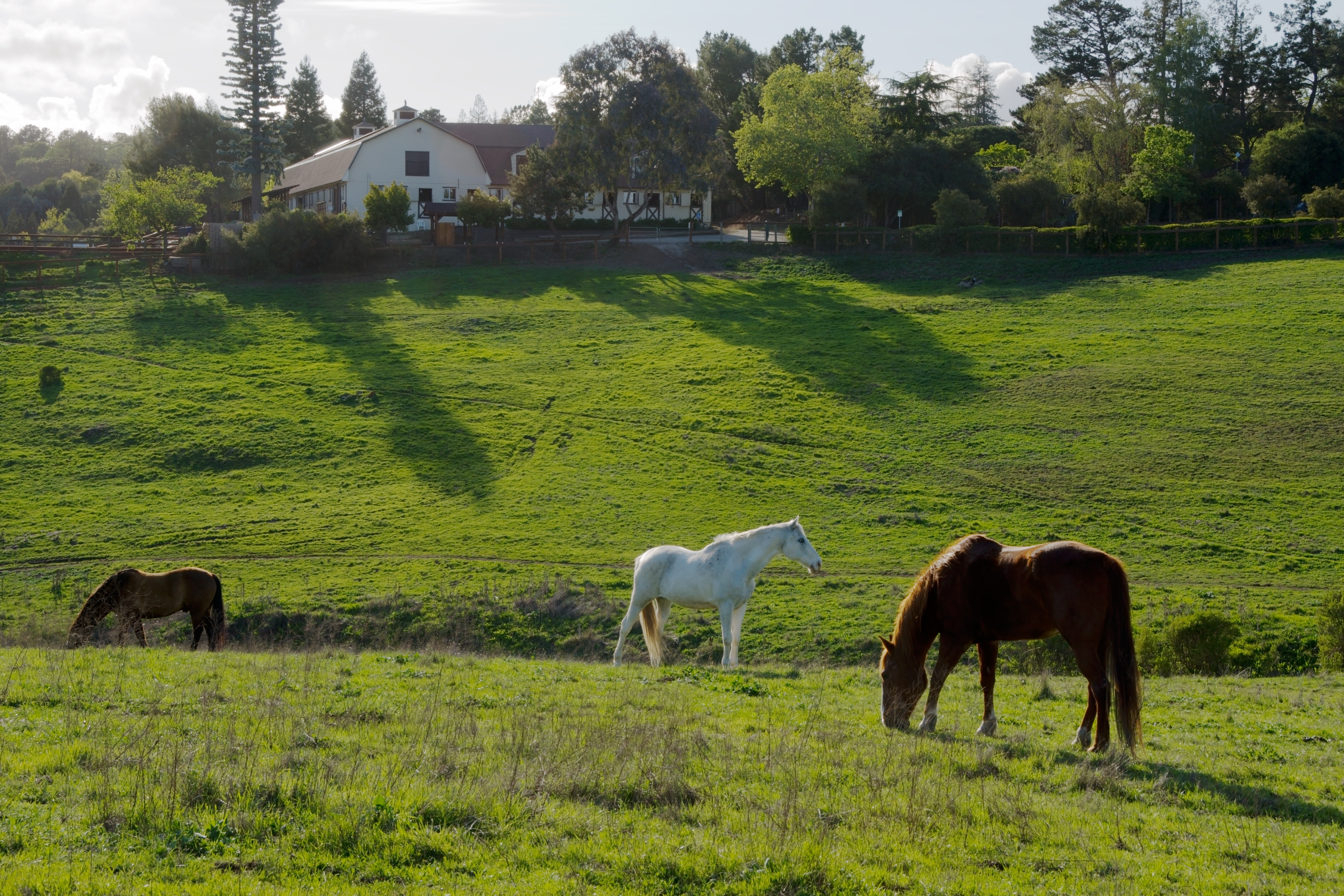
- Westwind Community Barn

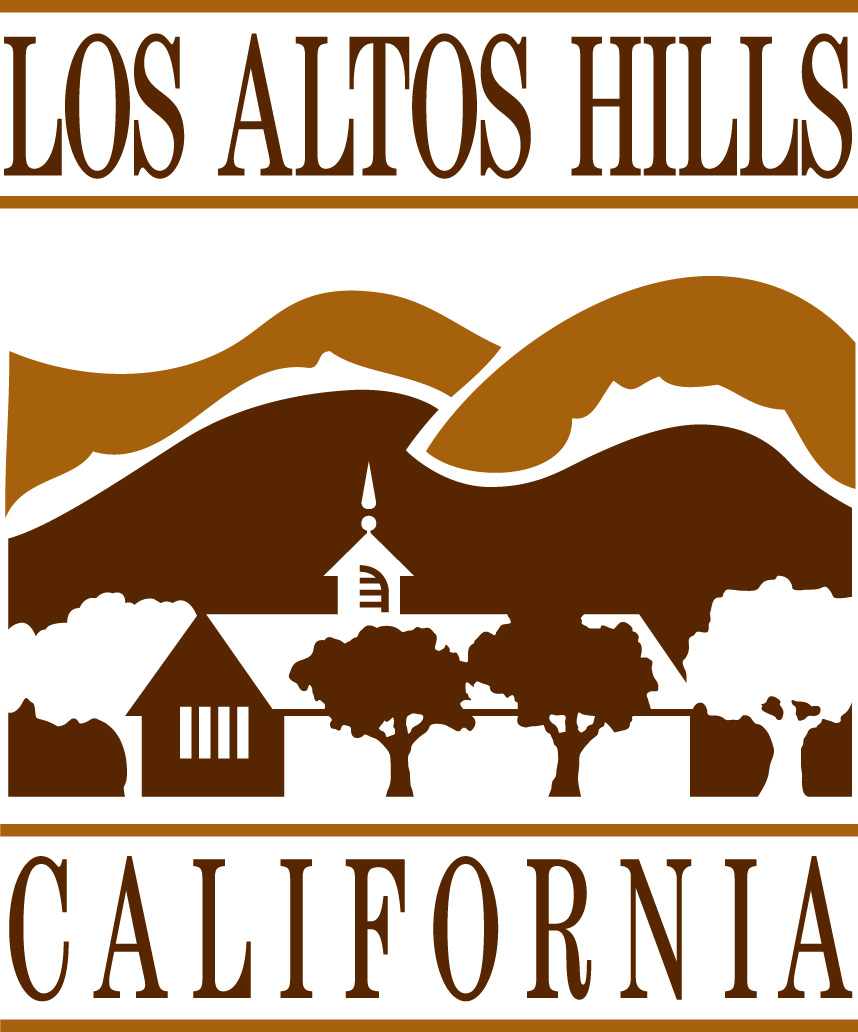
- Interactive map of Los Altos Hills, California
- Location in the United States Los Altos Hills (San Francisco Bay Area) Los Altos Hills (the United States)
- Coordinates: 37°22′17″N 122°8′15″W
- Country: United States
- State: California
- County: Santa Clara
- Incorporated: January 27, 1956

Government
  - Mayor: Rajiv Bhateja

Area
  - Total: 9.03 sq mi (23.39 km^{2})
  - Land: 9.03 sq mi (23.39 km^{2})
  - Water: 0 sq mi (0.00 km^{2}) 0%
- Elevation: 292 ft (89 m)

Population (2020)
  - Total: 8,489
  - Density: 940.0/sq mi (362.9/km^{2})
- Time zone: UTC-8 (PST)
  - Summer (DST): UTC-7 (PDT)
- ZIP codes: 94022, 94024
- Area code: 650
- FIPS code: 06-43294
- GNIS feature ID: 1659746
- Website: losaltoshills.ca.gov

Los Altos Hills (US: /lɑːs ˈæltoʊs/; Los Altos, Spanish for "The Heights") is an incorporated town in Santa Clara County, California, United States. The population was 8,489 at the 2020 census.

== History ==
The earliest inhabits in the area were the Ohlone, who maintained multiple villages nearby.

The area of Los Altos Hills consisted of two large Spanish–Mexican land grants: Rancho San Antonio de Padua and Rancho La Purísima Concepción. The land for Rancho San Antonio de Padua was given in 1839 by Governor Juan Bautista Alvarado to Spanish commander of Alta California, Juan Prado Mesa. When Mesa died in 1845, the land went into probate, with two claims honored.

Rancho La Purísima Concepción was given in 1840 by Governor Juan Bautista Alvarado to José Gorgonio and his son José Ramon, Ohlone Native Americans. In 1844, they sold part of the land to Juana Briones de Miranda. By 1861, Juana Briones had sold 3,000 acres (1,200 ha) to Martin Murphy Jr., a cattle rancher who had previously leased the land.

Los Altos Hills the town was incorporated on January 27, 1956.

== Geography ==
According to the United States Census Bureau, the town has a total area of 9.0 square miles (23.4 km^{2}), all land.

The town is located in a group of small hills. Both the Altamont and Monta Vista Faults pass through the town.

Los Altos Hills maintains a rural feel, similar to the neighboring Woodside and Portola Valley. There are many open space preserves, such as Rancho San Antonio and Westwind Barn.

=== Residential ===
Los Altos Hills has a ban on commercial zones, which was upheld by the California Court of Appeal (First District) in 1973. The town's two retail commercial operations are the book store on the campus of Foothill College and the gift shop on the grounds of the Immaculate Heart of the Poor Clare Colettines. The town does not have a post office or library.

The town's zoning regulations require a minimum lot size of one acre (4,000 m²), setbacks from the property boundary, and easements for public pathways. Landowners are limited to one primary dwelling per lot, which effectively bans multifamily housing; this ban and the minimum lot size were upheld as constitutional by the U.S. Court of Appeals for the Ninth Circuit in 1974.

The town contracts with Santa Clara County for police and fire services, making it a contract city under California law.

== Demographics ==
Historical population
Census	Pop.	Note	%±
1960	3,412		—
1970	6,871		101.4%
1980	7,421		8.0%
1990	7,514		1.3%
2000	7,902		5.2%
2010	7,922		0.3%
2020	8,489		7.2%
U.S. Decennial Census

Los Altos Hills is known for its expensive residential real estate.

=== 2020 census ===
As of the 2020 census, Los Altos Hills had a population of 8,489 and a population density of 940.2 inhabitants per square mile (363.0/km^{2}).

The age distribution was 19.2% under the age of 18, 7.9% aged 18 to 24, 13.7% aged 25 to 44, 31.5% aged 45 to 64, and 27.6% aged 65 or older. The median age was 51.7 years. For every 100 females, there were 96.0 males, and for every 100 females age 18 and over there were 94.2 males age 18 and over.

The census reported that 99.2% of the population lived in households, 0.8% lived in non-institutionalized group quarters, and no one was institutionalized. 99.4% of residents lived in urban areas, while 0.6% lived in rural areas.

There were 2,874 households, of which 32.5% had children under the age of 18 living in them. Of all households, 76.0% were married-couple households, 3.0% were cohabiting couple households, 8.7% had a male householder with no spouse or partner present, and 12.4% had a female householder with no spouse or partner present. About 10.9% of all households were made up of individuals and 7.2% had someone living alone who was 65 years of age or older. The average household size was 2.93, and there were 2,450 families (85.2% of all households).

There were 3,098 housing units at an average density of 343.1 units per square mile (132.5 units/km^{2}). Of all housing units, 7.2% were vacant and 92.8% were occupied. Of occupied units, 89.7% were owner-occupied and 10.3% were occupied by renters. The homeowner vacancy rate was 1.3% and the rental vacancy rate was 2.6%.

Racial composition as of the 2020 census
Race	Number	Percent
White	4,817	56.7%
Black or African American	22	0.3%
American Indian and Alaska Native	10	0.1%
Asian	2,863	33.7%
Native Hawaiian and Other Pacific Islander	23	0.3%
Some other race	103	1.2%
Two or more races	651	7.7%
Hispanic or Latino (of any race)	334	3.9%

=== Demographic estimates ===
In 2023, the US Census Bureau estimated that 35.7% of the population were foreign-born. Of all people aged 5 or older, 61.5% spoke only English at home, 2.9% spoke Spanish, 10.0% spoke other Indo-European languages, 21.8% spoke Asian or Pacific Islander languages, and 3.8% spoke other languages. Of those aged 25 or older, 99.2% were high school graduates and 85.6% had a bachelor's degree.

=== Income and poverty ===
The median household income in 2023 was more than $250,000, and the per capita income was $173,837. About 2.1% of families and 4.5% of the population were below the poverty line.

=== 2010 census ===
At the 2010 census Los Altos Hills had a population of 7,922. The population density was 900.0 inhabitants per square mile (347.5/km^{2}). The racial makeup of Los Altos Hills was 5,417 (68.4%) White, 37 (0.5%) African American, 4 (0.1%) Native American, 2,109 (26.6%) Asian, 8 (0.1%) Pacific Islander, 50 (0.6%) from other races, and 297 (3.7%) from two or more races. Hispanic or Latino of any race were 213 people (2.7%).

The census reported that 99.3% of the population lived in households and 0.7% lived in non-institutionalized group quarters.

There were 2,829 households, 949 (33.5%) had children under the age of 18 living in them, 2,204 (77.9%) were opposite-sex married couples living together, 114 (4.0%) had a female householder with no husband present, 53 (1.9%) had a male householder with no wife present. There were 53 (1.9%) unmarried opposite-sex partnerships, and 19 (0.7%) same-sex married couples or partnerships. 359 households (12.7%) were one person and 210 (7.4%) had someone living alone who was 65 or older. The average household size was 2.78. There were 2,371 families (83.8% of households); the average family size was 3.02.

The age distribution was 1,811 people (22.9%) under the age of 18, 342 people (4.3%) aged 18 to 24, 1,083 people (13.7%) aged 25 to 44, 2,848 people (36.0%) aged 45 to 64, and 1,838 people (23.2%) who were 65 or older. The median age was 50.2 years. For every 100 females, there were 97.8 males. For every 100 females age 18 and over, there were 96.4 males.

There were 3,001 housing units at an average density of 341.0 per square mile, of the occupied units 2,582 (91.3%) were owner-occupied and 247 (8.7%) were rented. The homeowner vacancy rate was 1.2%; the rental vacancy rate was 4.2%. 7,162 people (90.4% of the population) lived in owner-occupied housing units and 707 people (8.9%) lived in rental housing units.

The median household income was $219,485 and the median family income was $224,922. Males had a median income of $152,361 versus $89,216 for females. The per capita income for the town was $118,779. About 2.2% of families and 2.6% of the population were below the poverty line, including 0.7% of those under age 18 and 3.8% of those age 65 or over.

== Politics and government ==
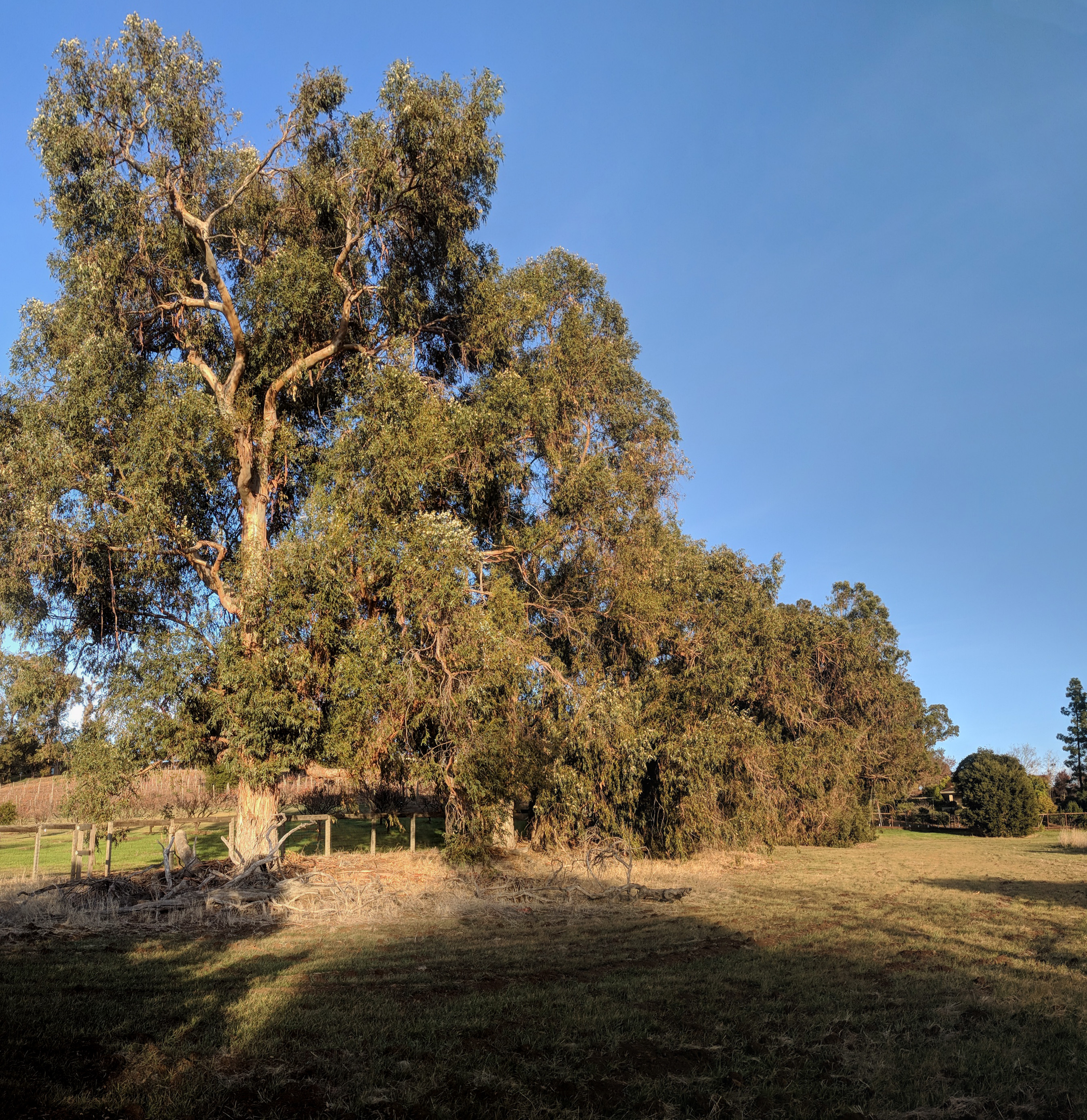
Eucalyptus trees at Esther Clark Park, which is partly in Los Altos Hills and partly in Palo Alto

The town of Los Altos Hills has a five-member elected city council.

In the California State Legislature, Los Altos Hills is in the 13th senatorial district, represented by Democrat Josh Becker and in the 23rd Assembly district, represented by Democrat Marc Berman.

In the United States House of Representatives, Los Altos Hills is in California's 16th congressional district, represented by Democrat Sam Liccardo.

== Education ==
Los Altos Hills is served by both the Palo Alto Unified School District (serving the northern part of the town) and the Los Altos School District (serving the southern part of the town). In 2008 the Los Altos School District reopened Gardner Bullis School, a public elementary (K-6) grade school in Los Altos Hills.

Ventana School is a private pre-school and elementary school modeled around the Reggio Emilia approach. Pinewood is a private coeducational K-12 school. The Pinewood School Upper Campus is also located in Los Altos Hills, serving students in grades 7–12.

Foothill College operated by the Foothill–De Anza Community College District is in the city. The college has the district's headquarters.

== Notable residents ==
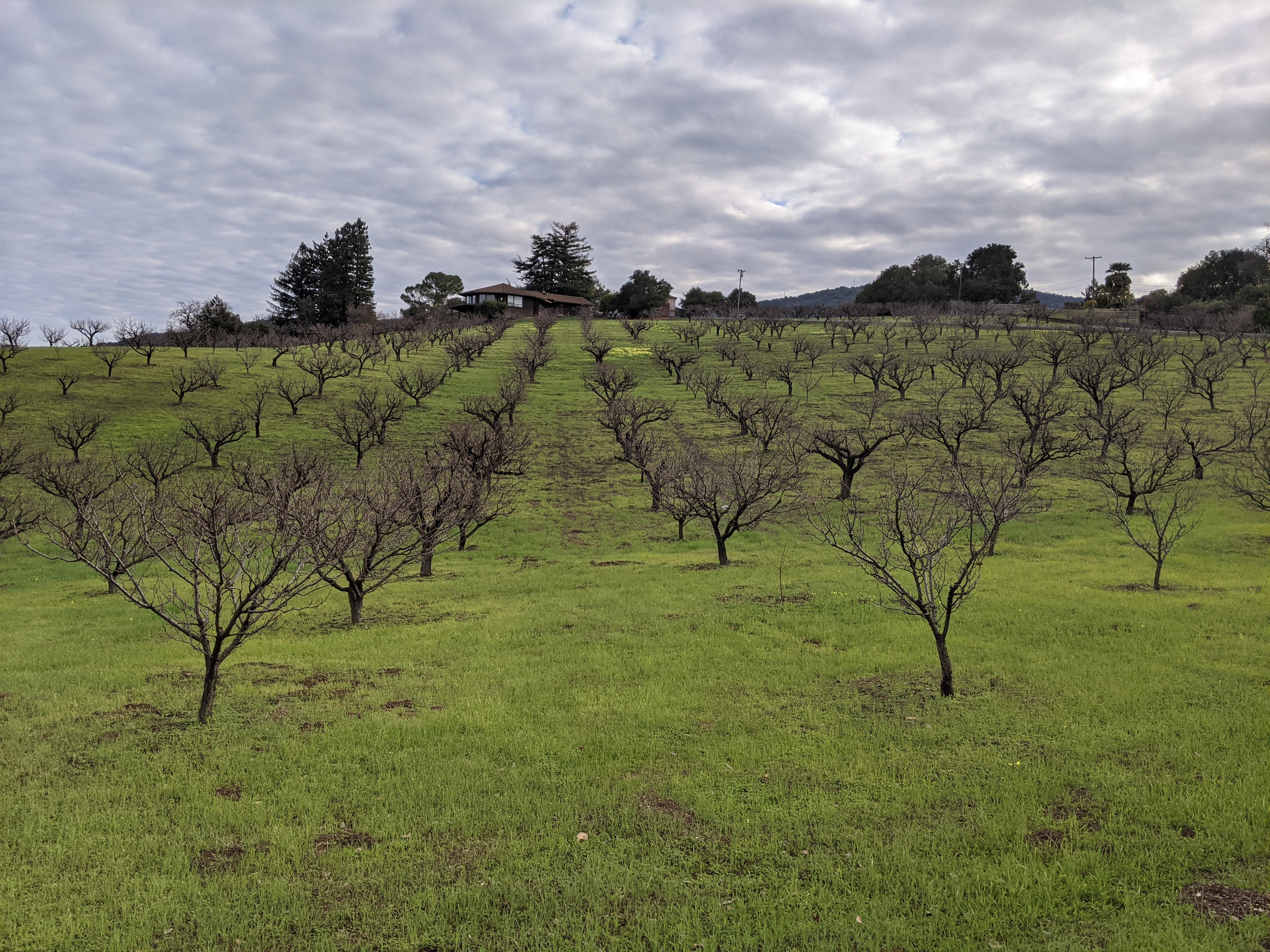
David Packard's home and apricot orchard in winter. The hills of Los Altos Hills are typically green in winter, brown in summer.

- Adrienne Barbeau, actress, singer and author
- Barry Bonds (born 1964), Major League Baseball player
- Sergey Brin, co-founder of Google
- John T. Chambers, former executive chairman and CEO of Cisco Systems
- Jon M. Chu and his father "Chef Chu" Lawrence Chu
- Edward Ginzton (1915–1998), Ukrainian-American engineer and Stanford physics professor.
- Jensen Huang, founder and former CEO of Nvidia
- Steve Kirsch, entrepreneur
- George M. Marcus, billionaire real estate broker and founder of Marcus & Millichap
- Yuri Milner, entrepreneur, venture capitalist, and physicist
- Gordon Moore, billionaire businessman
- Becky Morgan, former politician
- Andrew Ng, computer scientist and technology entrepreneur
- David Packard (1912–1996), co-founder of Hewlett-Packard
- Pief Panofsky (1919–2007), German-American physicist and Stanford professor
- Sundar Pichai, CEO of Alphabet Inc. and Google
- Frank Quattrone, investment banker
- Daniel Rosenbaum (born 1997), American-Israeli basketball player for Maccabi Ironi Ramat Gan in the Israeli Basketball Premier League
- Stephen Schott, real estate developer
- Wallace Stegner (1909–1993), historian and novelist
- Elizabeth Murphy Taaffe (1844–1875) rancher and early settler in Los Altos Hills, California
- Max Thieriot, actor and director
- Jerry Yang, co-founder and former CEO of Yahoo! Inc.
- Jed York, CEO of the San Francisco 49ers
- Connie Young Yu, writer, historian, and lecturer
