= Essex Property Trust =

American Real Estate Investment Trust

Essex Property Trust, Inc.

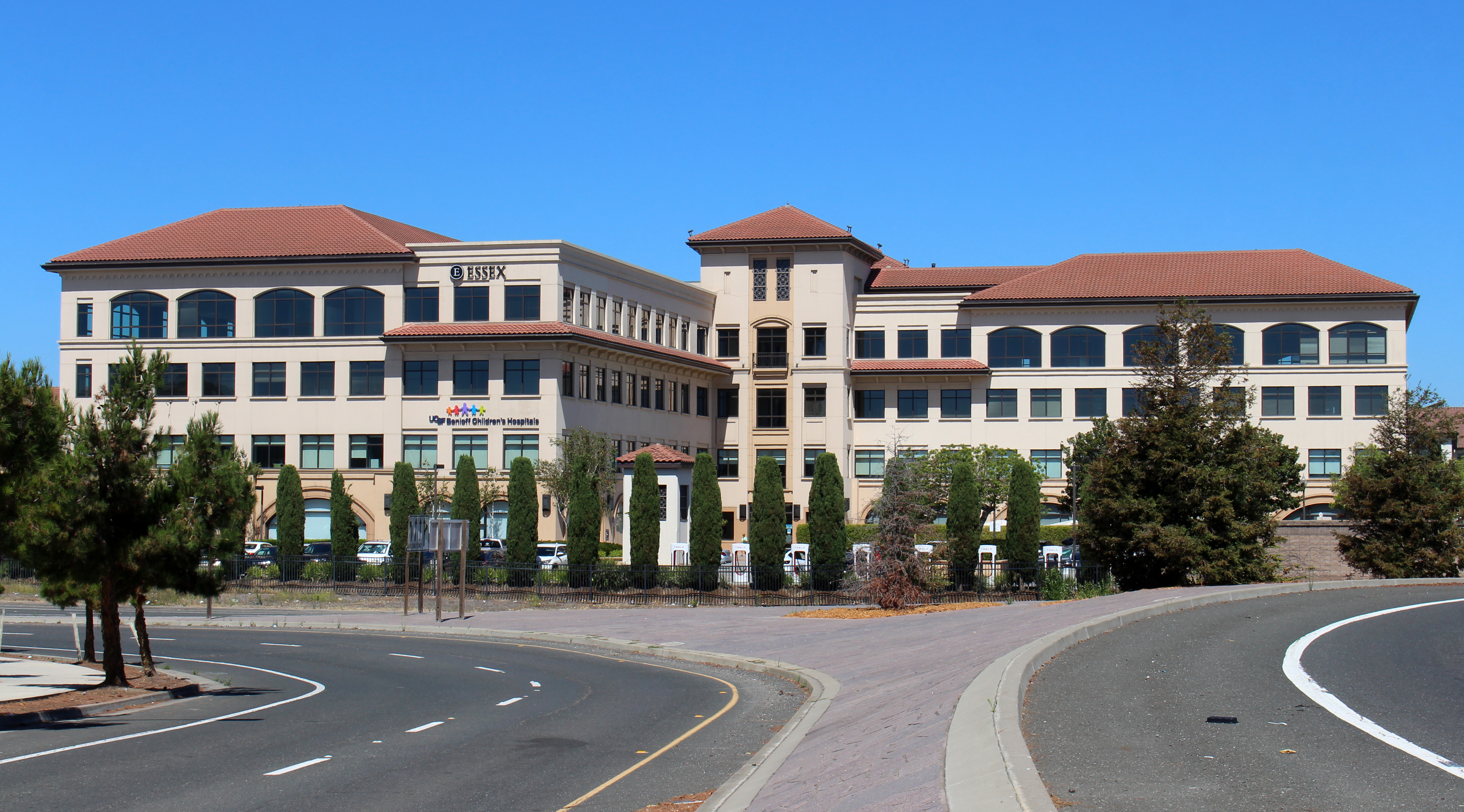
- Headquarters in San Mateo
- Type: Public company
- Traded as: NYSE: ESS; S&P 500 component
- ISIN: US2971781057
- Industry: Real estate investment trust
- Founded: 1971; 55 years ago
- Founder: George M. Marcus
- Headquarters: San Mateo, California
- Key people: George M. Marcus, Chairman; Angela L. Kleiman, CEO & President
- Products: Apartments
- Revenue: ▲US$1.89 billion (2025)
- Net income: ▼US$703 million (2025)
- Total assets: ▲US$13.2 billion (2025)
- Total equity: ▲US$5.54 billion (2025)
- Number of employees: 1,750 (2023)
- Website: www.essexapartmenthomes.com

Essex Property Trust is a publicly traded real estate investment trust that invests in apartments in California and in the Seattle metropolitan area.

As of December 31, 2023, the company owned interests in 252 apartment complexes, aggregating 61,997 apartment units, and 3 commercial office buildings, comprising 283,000 square feet.

It is the 11th largest owner of apartments in the United States and the 26th largest apartment property manager in the United States.

== History ==
The company was founded in 1971 by billionaire George M. Marcus, who also founded Marcus & Millichap that same year.

On June 13, 1994, the company became a public company via an initial public offering.

In April 2014, the company acquired BRE Properties for $4.3 billion.

In 2024, it acquired ownership interests in a joint venture owning 4 properties for $505 million.
