= Carl Gambino =

American real estate agent

Carl Gambino is an American real estate agent and founder of the Gambino Group at Compass, real estate professionals in the United States. Gambino operates across six markets in four states and has been named in The Hollywood Reporter's Top 30 Real Estate Agents in Los Angeles, New York, and Miami.

== Career ==
Gambino was first licensed in New York and began his career in commercial real estate, working at Marcus & Millichap.

From 2015 to 2020, Gambino worked at Beverly Hills-based Westside Estate Agency. In 2019, he had record-breaking sales in Encino, representing Joe Jonas and Sophie Turner in their $14.1 million acquisition.

In 2020, Gambino joined Compass. He founded the Gambino Group, which operates across: New York, Los Angeles, Miami, New Jersey, North Fork, and the Hamptons.

== Personal life ==
Gambino was born in New York and grew up primarily in New Jersey. He is married to interior designer Sarah Ivory. In 2021, he and his wife purchased a home on Miami Beach's Sunset Islands for $2.8 million, which they later sold for $5.7 million in 2023.
