= Los Medanos =

Los Medanos may refer to:

- Los Medanos College
- Los Medanos, the Samalayuca Dune Fields
- Rancho Los Medanos
