= Juan Prado Mesa =

Spanish commander, Alta California (d. 1845)

Alférez Juan Prado Mesa was a prominent Californio military commander in Alta California. He was born a subject of the Spanish Empire, and performed his military duties as an officer of the Republic of Mexico,

== Career ==
Mesa was a soldier stationed at the San Francisco Presidio in 1828. He was promoted to Corporal at Mission Santa Clara de Asís in 1832 and again to Sergeant in 1836.

In 1835, when Mariano Guadalupe Vallejo moved his troops to Sonoma, Mesa was made commander of the San Francisco Presidio. Later Mesa served as the commander of the Santa Clara Mission guard. Juan Prado Mesa was wounded in battle with aboriginals and died from his wounds in 1845.

== Family ==
His grandfather was Corporal Jose Valerio Mesa who accompanied Juan Bautista de Anza on the Anza Expedition to Alta California. His father was Jose Antonio Mesa who was awarded Rancho Los Medanos in 1839.

He married Mycaela Higuera and had a daughter, Encarnacion who inherited about 900 acres of her father's land grant.

== Rancho and legacy ==
For his service, in 1839 he received a land grant of one square league from Governor Juan Alvarado named Rancho San Antonio de Padua. The grant was bounded by Adobe Creek to the north and Stevens Creek to the south, and included Permanente Creek, and present-day Los Altos Hills.
