= George M. Marcus =

American real estate broker (born 1941)

- Born: George Moutsanas; 1941 (age 84–85); Euboea, Greece
- Education: San Francisco State University
- Occupation: Real estate broker
- Known for: Founder and chairman of Marcus & Millichap; Co-owner of Essex Property Trust
- Title: Chairman, Essex Property Trust
- Spouse: Judy Marcus
- Website: https://www.mmcrealestate.com/

George M. Marcus (born 1941) is a Greek-American billionaire real estate broker, the co-founder and chairman of Marcus & Millichap, and founder and chairman of Essex Property Trust.

== Early life ==
He was born George Moutsanas in Euboea, Greece, in 1941, and migrated to the US with his family in 1945, aged four.

He earned a bachelor's degree in economics from San Francisco State University (SFSU) in 1965.

== Career ==
In 1971, he co-founded Marcus & Millichap, with William A. Millichap.

Marcus is founder and chairman of Essex Property Trust. He owned 2.4% stake.

During the 1980s he was a trustee of the California State University and is a member of the CSU Foundation's board of governors. He also served 12 years as a University of California regent.

== Personal life ==
His wife Judy Otten Marcus graduated from SFSU in 1962 with a degree in recreation, and is a former physical education teacher.

Marcus lives in Los Altos Hills, California.

== Philanthropy ==
Marcus and his wife Judy donated $3 million to help found SFSU’s International Center for the Arts.

In 2017, Marcus donated $1 million to Hellenic College Holy Cross Greek Orthodox School of Theology.

In 2018, George and Judy Marcus donated $25 million to SFSU to establish the George and Judy Marcus Funds for Excellence in the Liberal Arts. The funds will support students and faculty in liberal and creative art programs at the school and make enhancements in its Department of Creative Writing and the School of Cinema. This donation follows a $1.8 million donation the year before to establish an athletics scholarship fund at the school.

In 2020, Marcus donated $2 million to the reconstruction of the St. Nicholas Greek Orthodox Church at the World Trade Center in New York City, adding to the $1 million that he had previously donated.
