= Rancho San Antonio de Padua =

Mexican land grant in California

Coordinates: 37.350°N 122.100°W

Rancho San Antonio was a 7,982-acre (32.30 km^{2}) Mexican land grant in present-day Santa Clara County, California given in 1839 by Governor Juan Alvarado to Juan Prado Mesa. The grant was bounded by Adobe Creek to the north and Stevens Creek to the south, and included Permanente Creek, and present-day Los Altos Hills.

== History ==
Juan Prado Mesa (1806–1845) was born in Santa Clara, grandson of Corporal José Valerio Mesa who came to California with the Anza Expedition, and son of Jose Antonio Mesa, grantee of Rancho Los Medanos. Since 1828, Juan Prado Mesa had been a soldier at the San Francisco Presidio. In 1835, when Vallejo moved his company to Sonoma, Alférez Juan Prado Mesa was left in charge of the San Francisco Presidio. Later Mesa served as the commander of the Santa Clara Mission guard. Juan Prado Mesa was wounded in an Indian fight in 1838, granted Rancho San Antonio in 1839, and died from his wounds in 1845.

With the cession of California to the United States following the Mexican-American War, the 1848 Treaty of Guadalupe Hidalgo provided that the land grants would be honored. As required by the Land Act of 1851, claims for Rancho San Antonio were filed with the Public Land Commission. Six claims were filed - two of which were patented. A claim was filed by the Mesa heirs (Encarnación Mesa et al.) with the Land Commission in 1852, and the grant patented at 4,440 acres (18.0 km^{2}) in 1866. A claim was filed by William A. Dana, Henry F. Dana, and James W. Weeks et al. with the Land Commission in 1853, and the grant patented at 3,541 acres (14.3 km^{2}) in 1857. A claim for 500 acres (2.0 km^{2}) filed by Henry C. Curtis with the Land Commission in 1853 was rejected. A claim for 2,551 acres (10.3 km^{2}) filed by William A. Dana and Henry F. Dana with the Land Commission in 1853 was rejected. A claim for 3,051 acres (12.3 km^{2}) filed by James W. Weeks with the Land Commission in 1853 was rejected. A claim for 100 acres (0.4 km^{2}) filed by William W. White with the Land Commission in 1853 was rejected.

Much of the land grant is now the Rancho San Antonio County Park.

== See also ==
- Ranchos of Santa Clara County, California
