= Permanente Creek =

Permanente Creek Arroyo Permanente
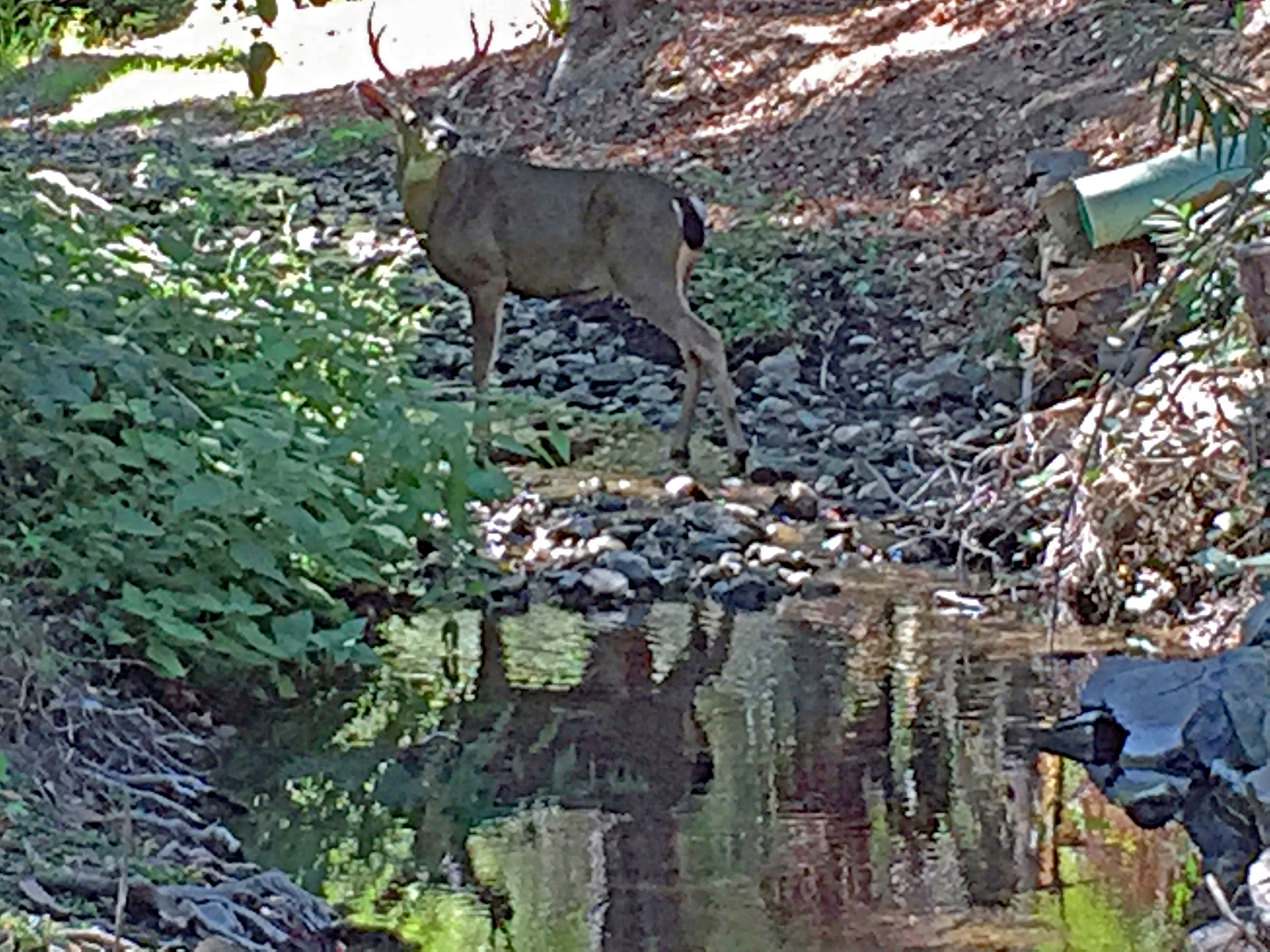
- Black-tailed deer buck straddling perennial reach of Permanente Creek between Foothill Expressway and Interstate 280 (2016)

Location
- Country: United States
- State: California
- Region: Santa Clara County
- Cities: Los Altos, Mountain View

Physical characteristics
- Source: Black Mountain in the Santa Cruz Mountains
  - location: Los Altos
  - coordinates: 37°19′20″N 122°08′41″W
  - elevation: 2,421 ft (738 m)
- Mouth: Mountain View Slough in southwest San Francisco Bay
  - location: Mountain View
  - coordinates: 37°26′00″N 122°05′09″W
  - elevation: 0 ft (0 m)

Basin features
- Tributaries
  - left: West Fork Permanente Creek and Hale Creek

Permanente Creek is a 13.3-mile-long (21.4 km) stream originating on Black Mountain in Santa Clara County, California, United States. Named by early Spanish explorers as Arroyo Permanente or Río Permanente because of its perennial flow, the creek descends the east flank of Black Mountain then courses north through Los Altos and Mountain View, discharging into southwest San Francisco Bay historically at the Mountain View Slough but now virtually entirely diverted via the Permanente Creek Diversion Channel to Stevens Creek and Whisman Slough in San Francisco Bay.

== History ==
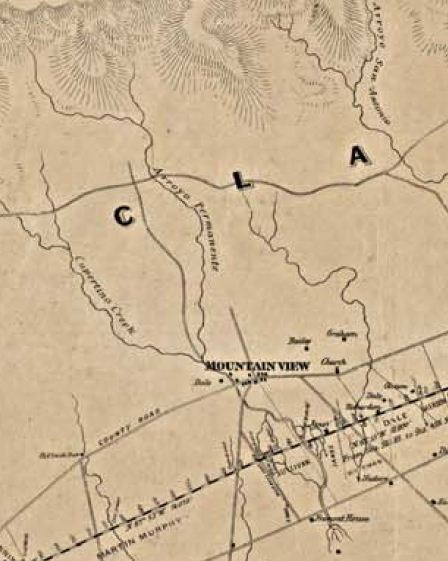
Portion of San Francisco & San Jose Railroad (Allardt) map showing historic connection of Permanente Creek (Arroyo Permanente) to Stevens Creek (Cupertino Creek) circa 1862. These creeks ended in marshes that were likely hydrologically connected to the Bay at times of high winter flows. Hale Creek and Arroyo San Antonio (Adobe Creek) are shown to the west of Cupertino Creek.

The Ohlone Indians lived in the area for over 3,000 years prior to the arrival of the Europeans. A large village, known as Partacsi, was located in this general area. An expedition led by Colonel Juan Bautista de Anza passed through this area in March 1776 as he forged the first overland route from Monterey to San Francisco Bay. Mission Santa Clara de Asis was founded in October of the same year, where many of the local Indians were taken. Governor Alvarado granted Rancho San Antonio de Padua to Juan Prado Mesa in 1839. This 440-acre (1.8 km^{2}) rancho was bounded by Adobe Creek to the north and Stevens Creek to the south, and included Permanente Creek. On a drawing of Rancho San Antonio in 1839 Permanente Creek is shown as Arroyo Permanente. Mesa had been a soldier at the Presidio of San Francisco since 1828, served as a corporal in the Santa Clara Guard, and had won fame as a soldier and Indian fighter. Mesa died in 1845.

Permanente Creek is also the namesake for Kaiser Permanente. Bess Kaiser and her spouse, industrialist Henry J. Kaiser, had a lodge on the creek's headwaters above the large Permanente Quarry and Cement Plant, and, in 1945, Bess felt that the name of their attractive and dependable stream would be a good name for their medical program at the shipyards. That medical program became Kaiser Permanente.

== Watershed ==
Permanente Creek consists of approximately 13.3 miles (21.4 km) of channel draining a watershed area of 17.5 square miles (45 km^{2}). From its origination at 2,421 feet (738 m) in headwaters protected by the Midpeninsula Regional Open Space District just north of the peak of Black Mountain (and just east of the Black Mountain Trail), Permanente Creek descends along the Permanente Quarry (currently known as the Lehigh Southwest Cement Plant and Quarry), and continues easterly through unincorporated County land for about five miles (8.0 km), then turns to the north at the base of the foothills and continues another eight miles (13 km) along the valley floor. It has two major tributaries, the West Fork Permanente Creek and Hale Creek. West Fork Permanente Creek and its Wildcat Canyon tributary were formerly known as Ohlone Creek. West Fork Permanente Creek begins on the east side of 1,253-foot (382 m) Ewing Hill, and runs easterly until it reaches the connector from the Chamise and Rogue Valley Trails where an earthen dam forms High Meadow Pond (aka Rogue Valley Pond). Below the pond, the West Fork is joined by 1.7-mile (2.7 km) long Wildcat Canyon Creek at Deer Hollow Farm, then continues on its run (3.2-mile (5.1 km) total) to the Permanente Creek mainstem which it joins 0.5 miles (0.80 km) south of Interstate 280.

Flows are perennial in the upper watershed but seasonal on the valley floor, with two exceptions: the portion of the Permanente Creek mainstem between Foothill Expressway and Interstate 280, and the Hale Creek tributary. The perennial reaches of these creeks share the same perennial nature as a similar reach on nearby Adobe Creek.

=== Permanente Creek Diversion Channel ===
Except for sakrete (bagged concrete) banking and several weirs, Permanente Creek's upper mainstem runs about 8 miles (13 km) in a relatively unmodified natural channel until reaching Portland and Miramonte Avenues at the north end of Heritage Oaks Park. Here the creek changes course, entering the Permanente Creek Diversion Channel, a concrete trapezoidal channel constructed by the Santa Clara Valley Water District (SCVWD) in 1959. The Permanente Creek Diversion Channel runs east 1.3 miles (2.1 km), passing through culverts beneath Grant Road, Saint Giles Lane, and Highway 85. Except in high flow winter storm events, Permanente Creek's entire flow is diverted east to Stevens Creek via the Diversion Channel.

The diversion is controlled by a floodgate which is closed every winter, diverting virtually all winter flows east to Stevens Creek, in order to prevent floodwaters from flowing north in the original creek channel through dense residential areas. Therefore, the Diversion Channel effectively reconnects Permanente Creek to the Stevens Creek watershed. This recapitulates the 1862 Allardt Map of the San Francisco & San Jose Railroad which shows Permanente Creek (Arroyo Permanente) as a tributary of Stevens Creek (then Cupertino Creek) (see inset). This is significant ecologically, because Stevens Creek still hosts an anadromous steelhead trout run. Although steep drops in the Diversion Channel are impassable barriers to upstream fish migration, modifications to the Diversion Channel would open up an additional 9 miles (14 km) of upper Permanente Creek watershed to steelhead trout.

The Diversion Channel essentially changes the total length of Permanente Creek from 13.3 miles (21.4 km) to San Francisco Bay to 9.3 miles (15.0 km) ending at its junction with Stevens Creek just past Highway 85. However, Hale Creek still flows to the channelized lower reaches of Permanente Creek.

== Permanente Creek Diversion Channel Gallery ==
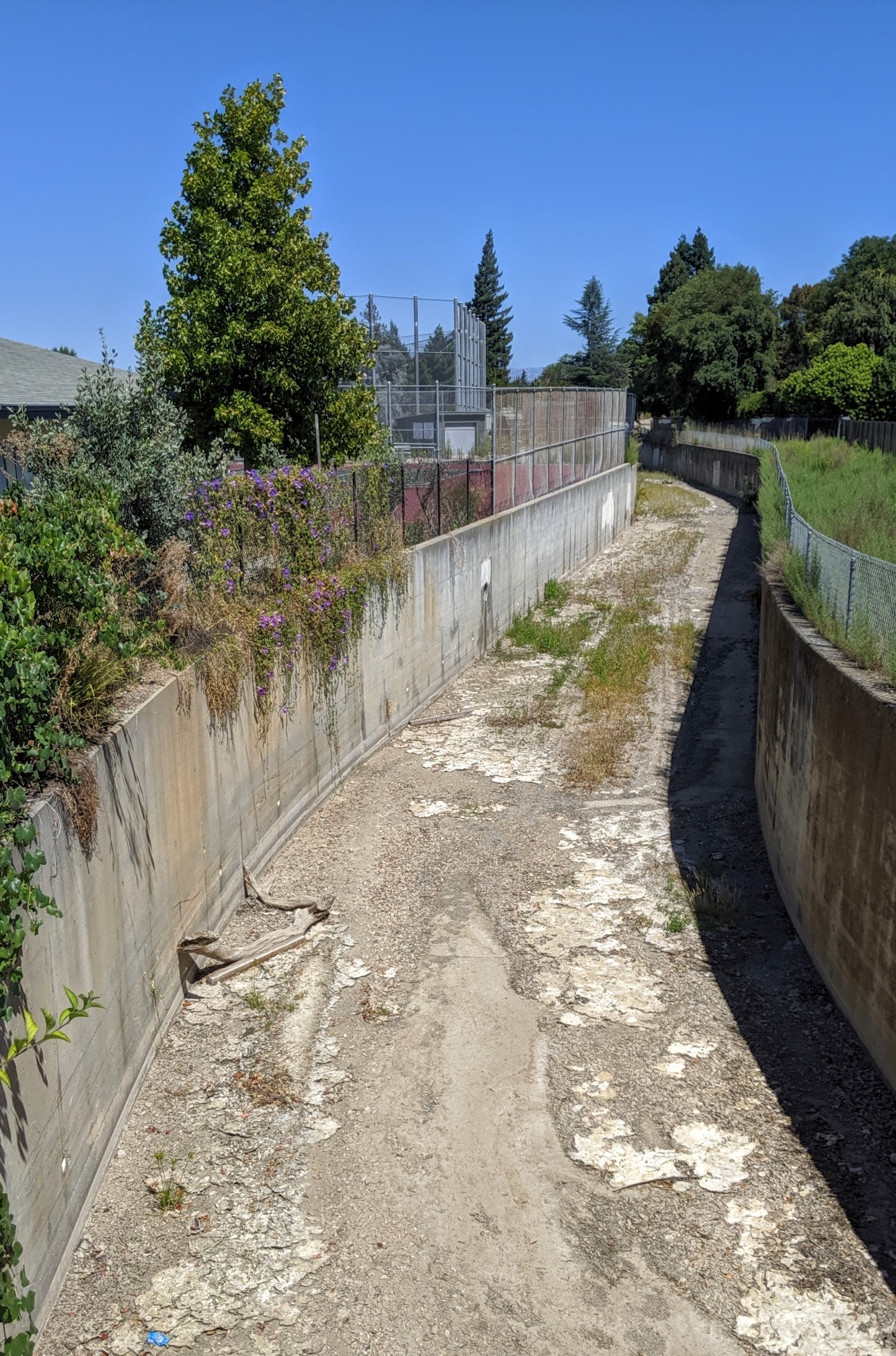
Permanente Creek Diversion Channel flows 1.3 miles (2.1 km). Here behind Blach Middle School in Los Altos.

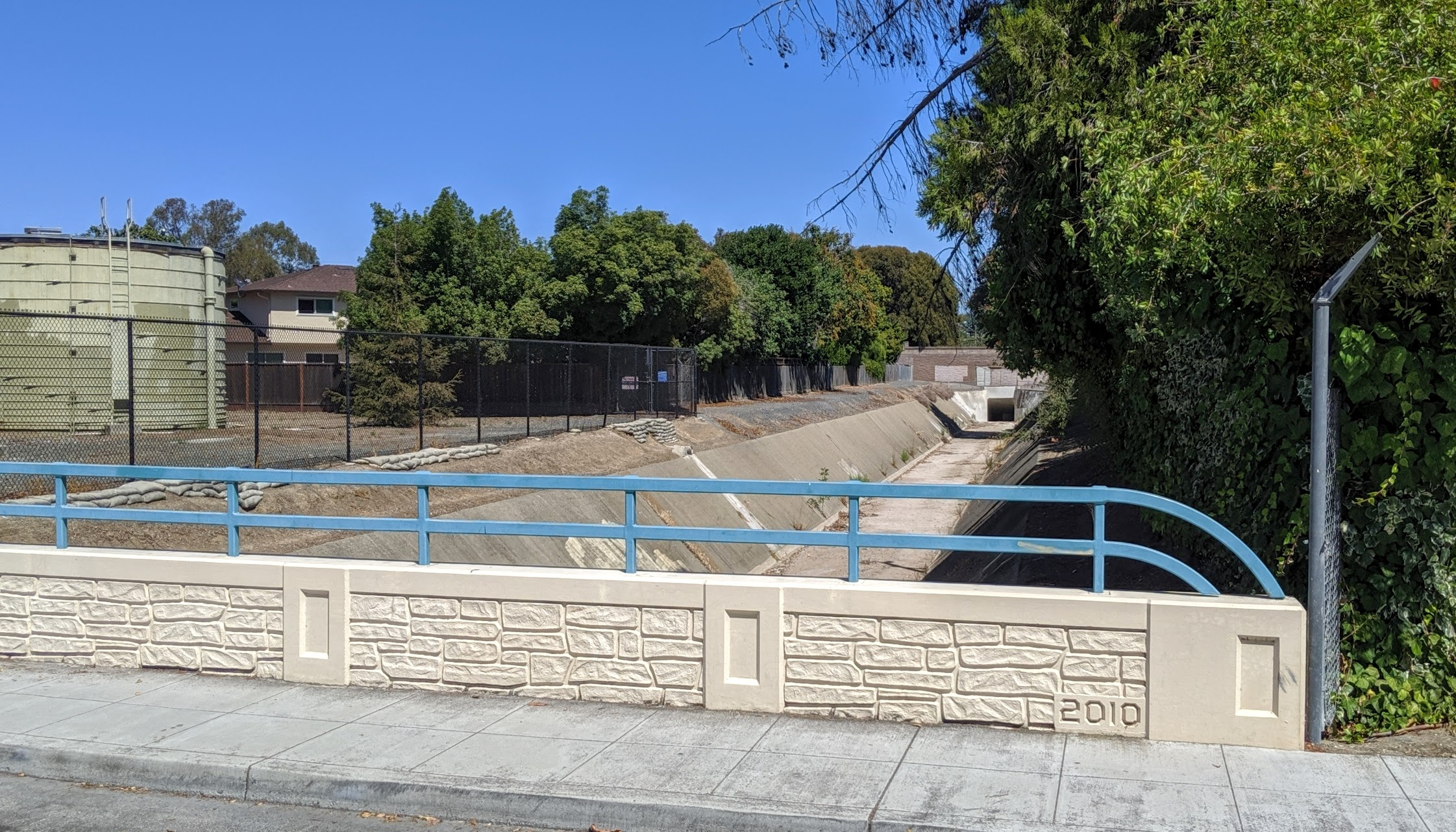
Looking east along Permanente Creek Diversion Channel as it approaches the box culvert under Highway 85.

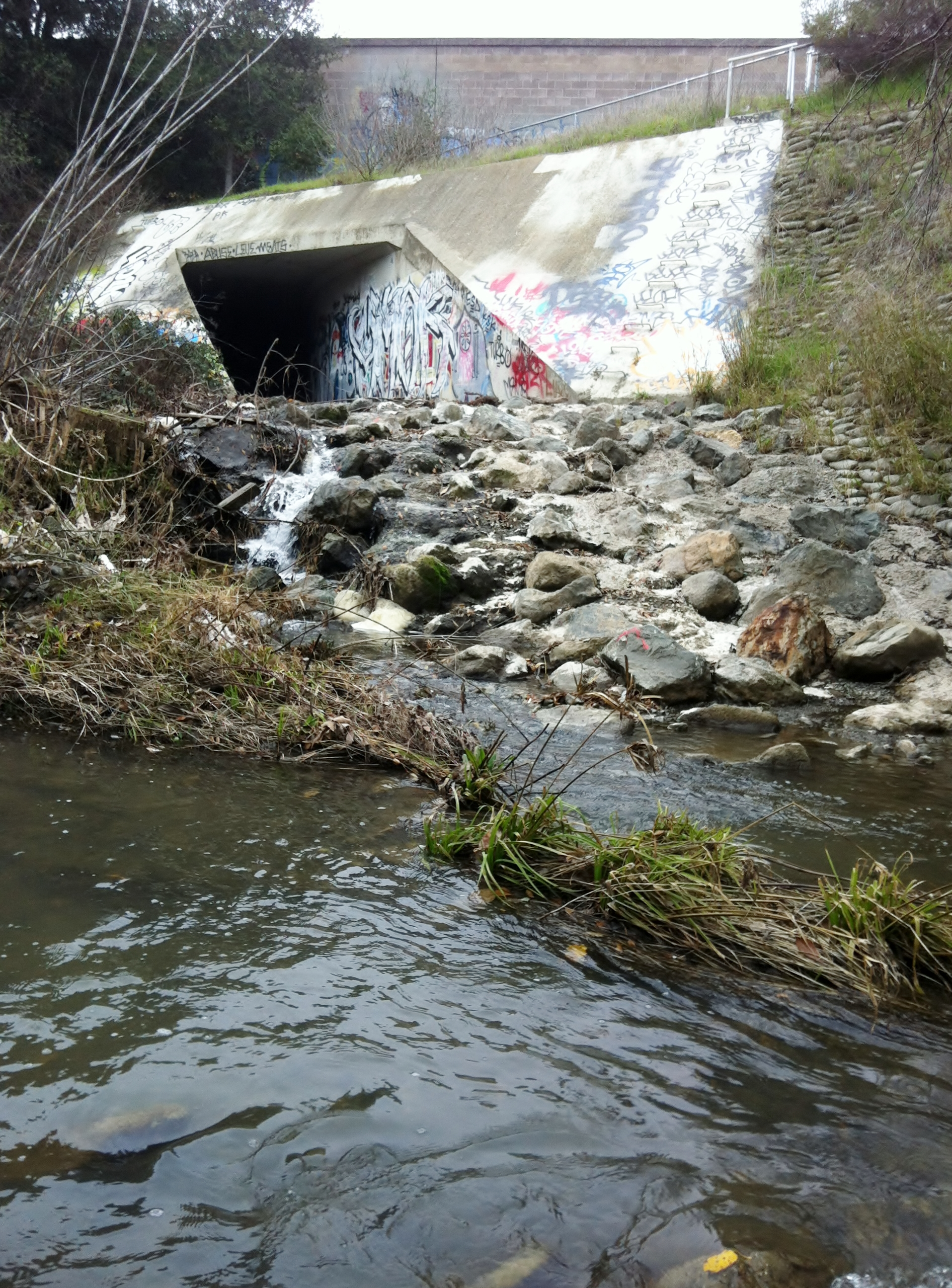
Looking west, from east side of Stevens Creek, at terminus of Permanente Creek Diversion Channel as it exits beneath Highway 85. Here Permanente Creek drops about ten vertical feet over cemented boulders, an impassable barrier to in-migrating steelhead trout, 2013.

=== Lower mainstem ===
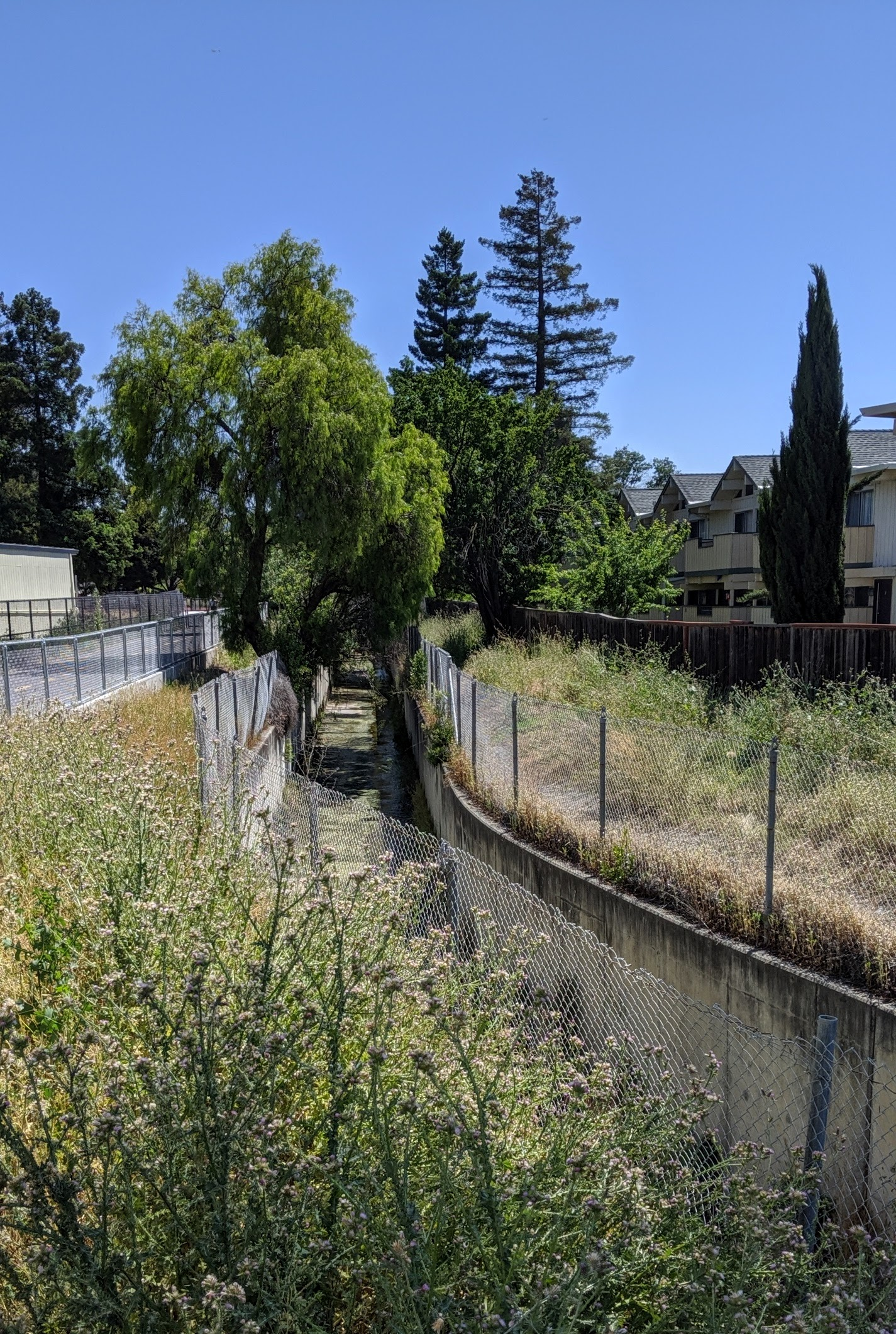
Most of the creek's route through Mountain View is channelized as here by Crittenden Middle School.

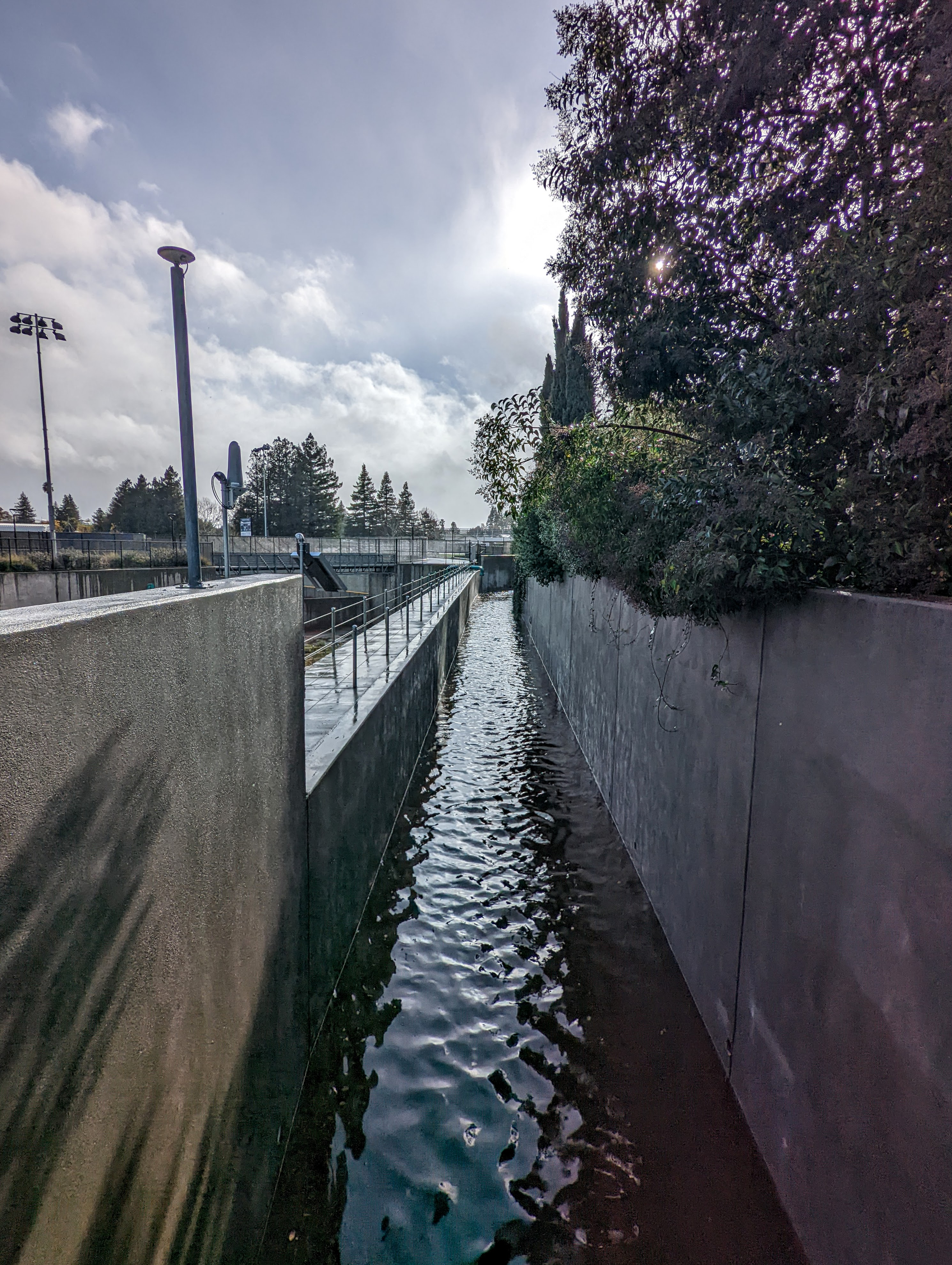
Permanente Creek where it can overflow (to the left) into the McKelvey Park retention basin.

The original creek channel below the floodgate in the Diversion Channel, now severely depleted of water, runs north another 1.5 miles (2.4 km) to its confluence with Hale Creek just upstream from McKelvey Park. Permanente Creek's original channel then goes on to pass under U. S. Highway 101, along the west side of the Google campus, and out to the Bay at the Mountain View Slough just east of Shoreline Park, the latter built on a reclaimed San Francisco garbage dump in 1983. This lowest part of the creek historically disappeared into the marshland before reaching the Bay, and its channel was extended to the Bay in the nineteenth century. The creek must have been hydrologically connected to the Bay at times of high winter flows since steelhead trout were able to access Permanente Creek historically. Saltwater is pumped from Charleston Slough into Shoreline Lake and from there it flows to Permanente Creek and then back into the Bay. The Mountain View Slough carries flows to the Bay between former salt ponds A1 and A2W. The levees around these ponds will be breached and opened to the Bay as part of the South Bay Salt Pond Restoration Project Phase II.

The Santa Clara Valley Water District has been working (2010–2020) to excavate as much as 23 feet (7.0 m) down to create flood detention basins to protect homes from a 100-year Permanente Creek flood, at Cuesta Park Annex, Blach Intermediate School, McKelvey Park, and Rancho San Antonio County Park. Despite considerable community opposition, the SCVWD Board approved the decision to go ahead on June 17, 2010. The Blach School Board voted against use of school property for a detention basin but construction permits are being sought as of 2016 for the McKelvey Park and Rancho San Antonio Park basins. Construction of the McKelvey Park detention basin and recreational facilities was completed in February 2020. Construction at Rancho San Antonio Park is planned to include a 15-foot deep basin and new park infrastructure.

== Ecology ==
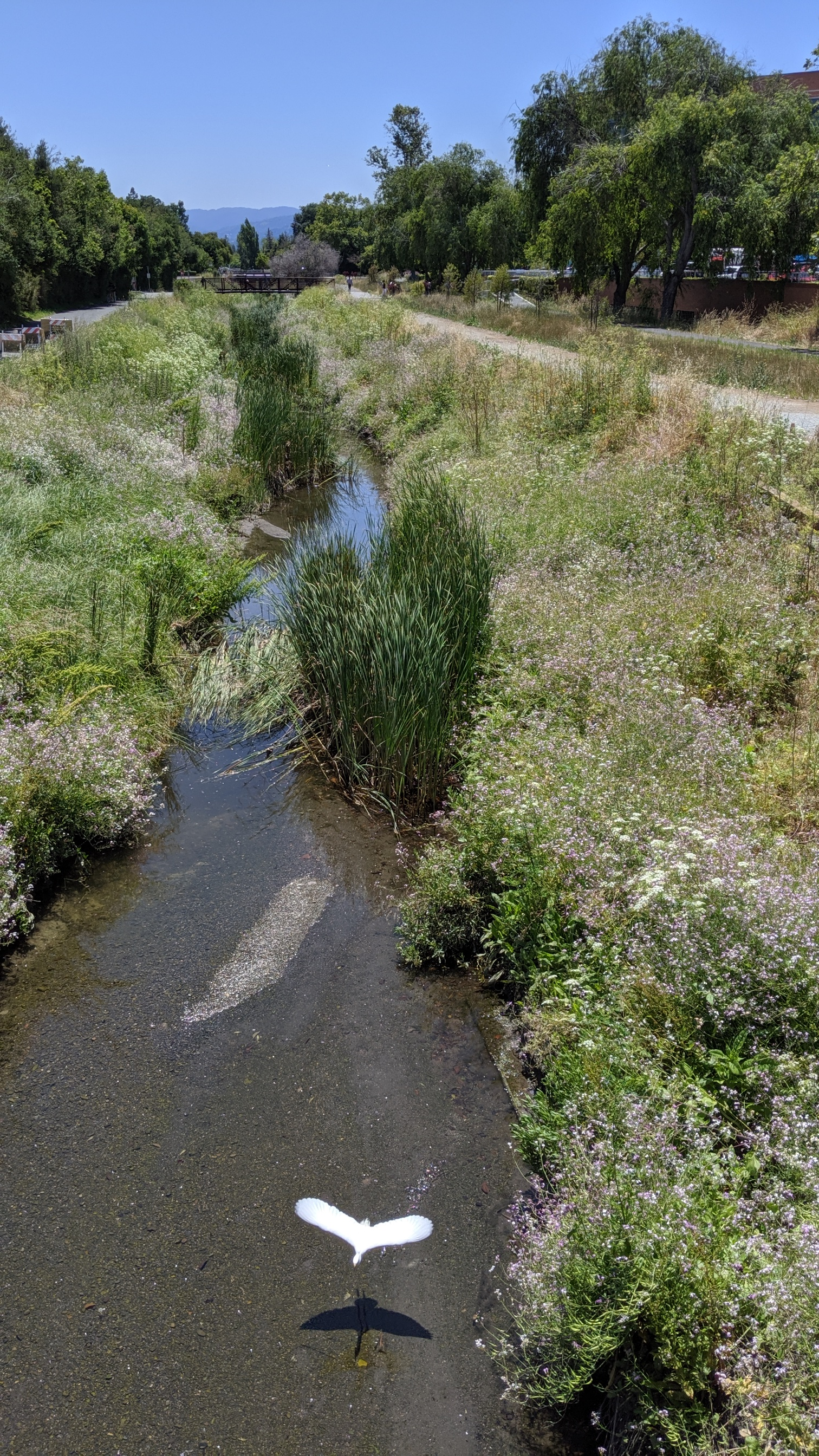
Egrets are a common sight in the creek near the bay. There is an egret rookery in the trees on Shorebird Way a few blocks away.

Federally threatened California red-legged frogs (Rana draytonii)) inhabit the upper watershed of Permanente Creek and the US Fish and Wildlife Service in 2017 asked the Army Corps of Engineers to assure that sufficient riparian habitat, specifically near ponds 14 and 21 along the Permanente Quarrry, would be set in a conservation easement to ensure their survival. In fact, a 2011 biological resources assessment of the quarry property found six California special status wildlife species, including the California red-legged frog, dusky-footed woodrat {Neotoma fuscipes), white-tailed kite (Elanus leucurus), olive-sided flycatcher (Contopus cooperi)), yellow warbler (Setophaga petechia), and grasshopper sparrow (Ammodramus savannarum).

Although Leidy postulated that steelhead trout (coastal rainbow trout) (Oncorhynchus mykiss irideus) were once native to Permanente Creek but now extirpated, twenty stream resident rainbow trout from the stream were sampled in a genetic study by the SCVWD and published in 2008. In 1940, a California Department of Fish and Game stream survey noted a resident's account of Permanente Creek as formerly a "fine trout stream" from which anglers caught large fish. Since most of the creek's flow is diverted to the Permanente Creek Diversion which culminates in a 10-foot (3.0 m) drop, steelhead can no longer ascend the stream. However, rainbow trout (the landlocked form of steelhead trout) can successfully reproduce in freshwater and continue to do so. The genetics study indicates that their genetics have historical integrity, i.e. they are not hatchery stock. A study of trout in South Bay streams found the Permanente Creek trout to be the most genetically introgressed of any watershed in the region, potentially descended from a single, surviving family of trout. Downstream fish passage barrier removal will be key to restoring the genetic diversity, and thus likelihood of survival, of these trout. Also of relevance, the cement company operating in the upper part of the watershed has discharged sediment-laden water into Permanente Creek and has undertaken corrective actions. As recommended by Becker in 2007 and Higgins in 2012, modification of the Permanente Creek Diversion Channel would enable steelhead trout to return to the protected upper reaches of Permanente Creek beginning above Heritage Oaks Park and including Rancho San Antonio County Park and Rancho San Antonio Open Space Preserve. The amount of stream length available to spawning steelhead trout above the Diversion Channel would be increased significantly by more than 10 miles (16 km) (7.5 miles (12.1 km) of Permanente Creek mainstem plus 2.4 miles (3.9 km) of West Fork Permanente Creek (to the small reservoir) plus additional miles of Wildcat Canyon Creek and other small tributaries).

Leidy's 2007 report also recorded the fish still inhabiting Permanente Creek - including native California roach (Lavinia symmetricus), Sacramento sucker (Catostomus occidentalis occidentalis), threespine stickleback (Gasterosteus aculeatus), and non-native bluegill (Lepomis macrochirus), common carp (Cyprinus carpio), rainwater killifish (Lucania parva), and western mosquitofish (Gambusia affinis).

Riparian trees on Permanente Creek include the State's tallest and third largest California bay laurel tree (Umbellularia californica) - see Gallery below, estimated to be over 200 years old. Other riparian trees include Willow ssp. (Salix ssp.), California sycamore (Platanus racemosa), white alder (Alnus rhombifolia), black cottonwood (Populus trichocarpa), Fremont cottonwood (Populus fremontii), bigleaf maple (Acer macrophyllum), California buckeye (Aesculus californica) and California walnut (Juglans californica).

Shoreline Park meadows near the mouth of Permanente Creek provide critical remnant habitat for the western burrowing owl (Athene cunicularia), a bird that has vanished from many counties in the Bay Area. The owl was listed as a Species of Special Concern (a pre-listing category under the Endangered Species Act) by the California Department of Fish and Game in 1979, and its Bay Area population continues to decline. Although there were hundreds of burrowing owls in Santa Clara County when monitoring began in the 1980s, now there are only 35, with three breeding pairs raising ten eggs at Shoreline in 2011 (less than half the number of young in 2003).

In August, 2003 the Stevens & Permanente Creeks Watershed Council was officially formed to support stewardship of the watersheds.

== Pollution ==
=== Mercury ===
The cement plant at the Permanente (Lehigh Hanson) Quarry is responsible for 29% of total Bay Area airborne mercury emissions and was shown to impact a rural site, Calero Reservoir, 20 miles (32 km) away. Mercury, a neurotoxin and pollutant which is concentrated in the aquatic food web, was found to be 5.8 to 6.7 times higher in precipitation near the cement plant than at a control location 2.0 miles (3.2 km) away. A 2011 study showed a significant geographic association between the occurrence of autism in local school districts, such as the Cupertino Union School District, and higher levels of ambient mercury generated by coal-fired power plants in Bexar County, Texas and the Permanente Quarry cement plant in Santa Clara County, California.

=== Selenium discharges ===
Groundwater fills the current quarry and is pumped into Permanente Creek. Selenium pollution in the creek downstream from the quarry ranged from 13 to 81 micrograms/liter (μg/L). A North Quarry water sample in January 2010 had a dissolved selenium concentration of 82 μg/L, indicating that the quarry is the source of the selenium pollution. Selenium is bioaccumulated in the aquatic food web. Safety standards for selenium concentrations in fresh water are 5 μg/L under the California Toxics Rule (same as the National Toxics Rule set by the U.S. Environmental Protection Agency (USEPA) in 2000 and 2012.

=== Sediment discharges ===
Anthropomorphic activities related to quarry operations and the cement plant have resulted in sediment discharges into Permanente Creek that are 3.5 times what would be expected under normal conditions. Sediment loads in the upper Permanente Creek mainstem are 15 times those in the West Fork Permanente Creek, which drains mostly parkland. These sediment loads could threaten the resident rainbow trout (Oncorhynchus mykiss) population in the creek.

== Recreation ==
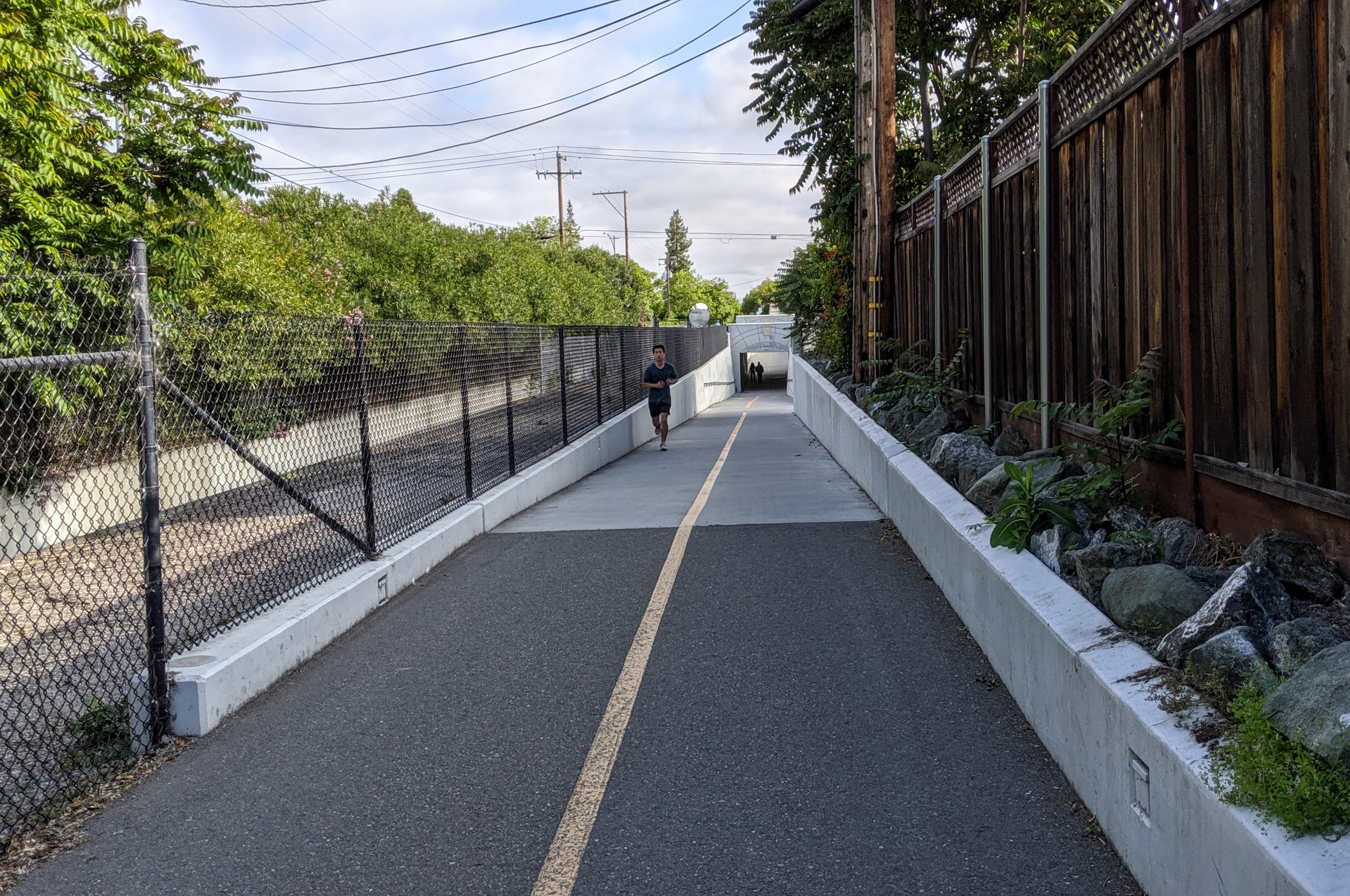
The Permanente Creek Trail underpass at Old Middlefield Way

Above Interstate 280 (and below the Quarry) a large section of the creek mainstem and all of the West Fork Permanente Creek tributary, and the Ohlone Creek sub-tributary, is protected by Rancho San Antonio County Park and Rancho San Antonio Open Space Preserve. The 3,988 acres (16.14 km^{2}) Open Space Preserve, combined with the adjoining 165 acres (0.67 km^{2}) County Park, in area and contains 23 miles (37 km) of hiking trails. A one-mile walk from the County Park's main parking lot leads to the historic 10-acre Deer Hollow Farm on the West Fork Permanente Creek.

There is a trail that runs along the creek, beginning at the historic Rengstorff House in Shoreline Park where it is connected to the San Francisco Bay Trail. The Permanente Creek Trail runs from there south to West Middlefield Road.

== Wildlife Gallery ==
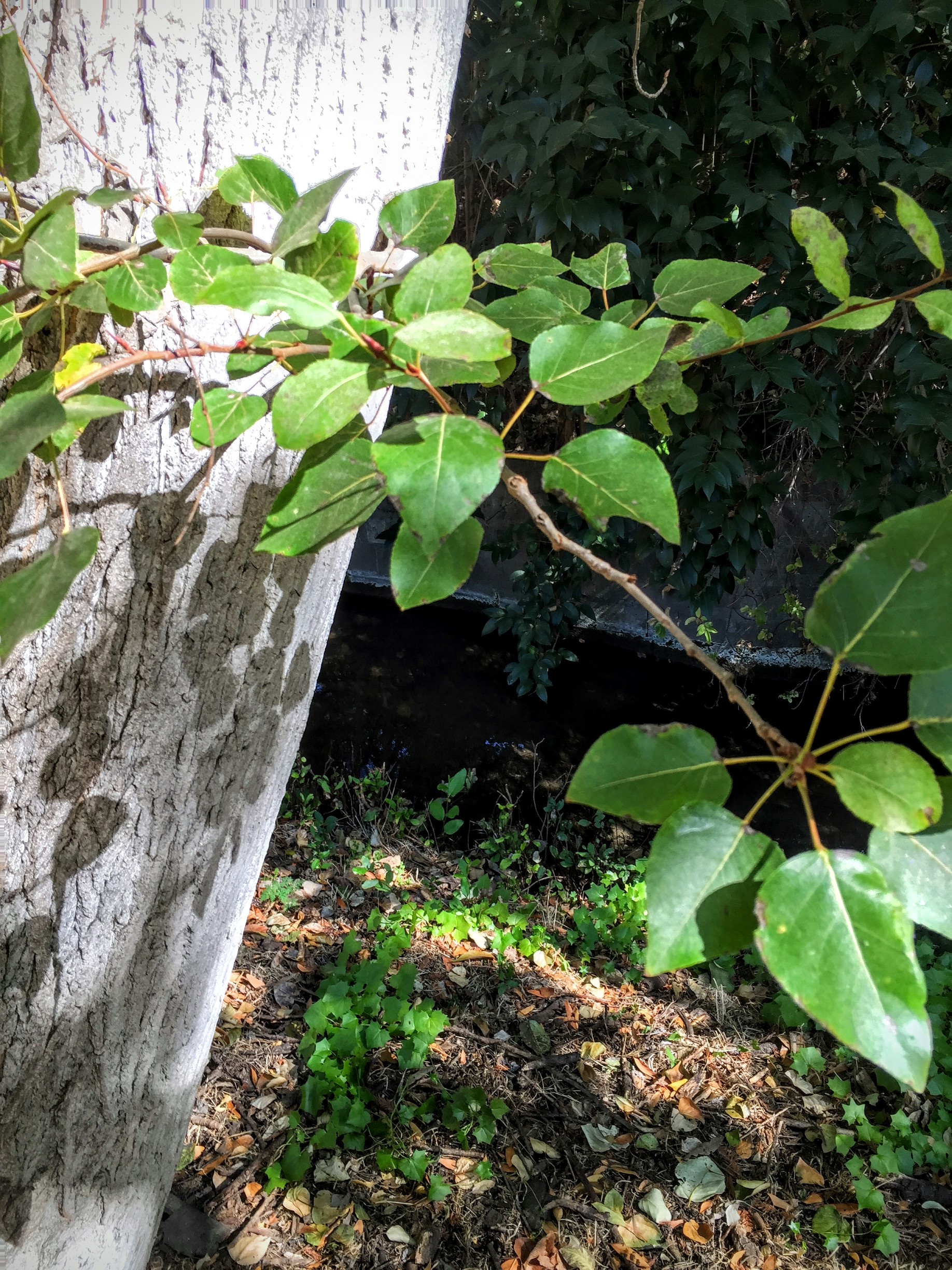
Native mature black cottonwood (Populus trichocarpa) in Permanente Creek between Foothill Expressway and Interstate 280. Note perennial flow October 8, 2016.

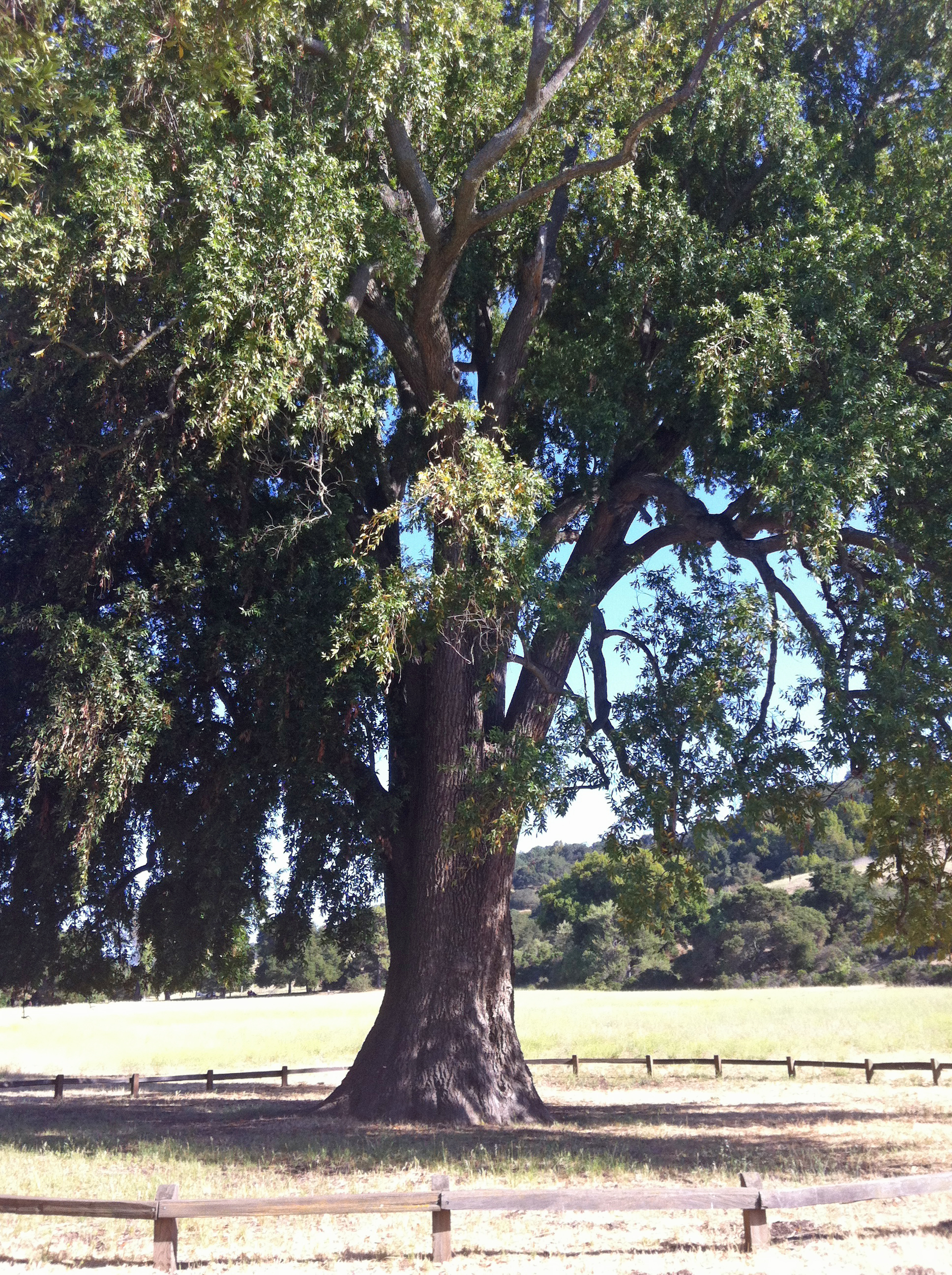
Giant California bay laurel by the creek in Rancho San Antonio County Park.

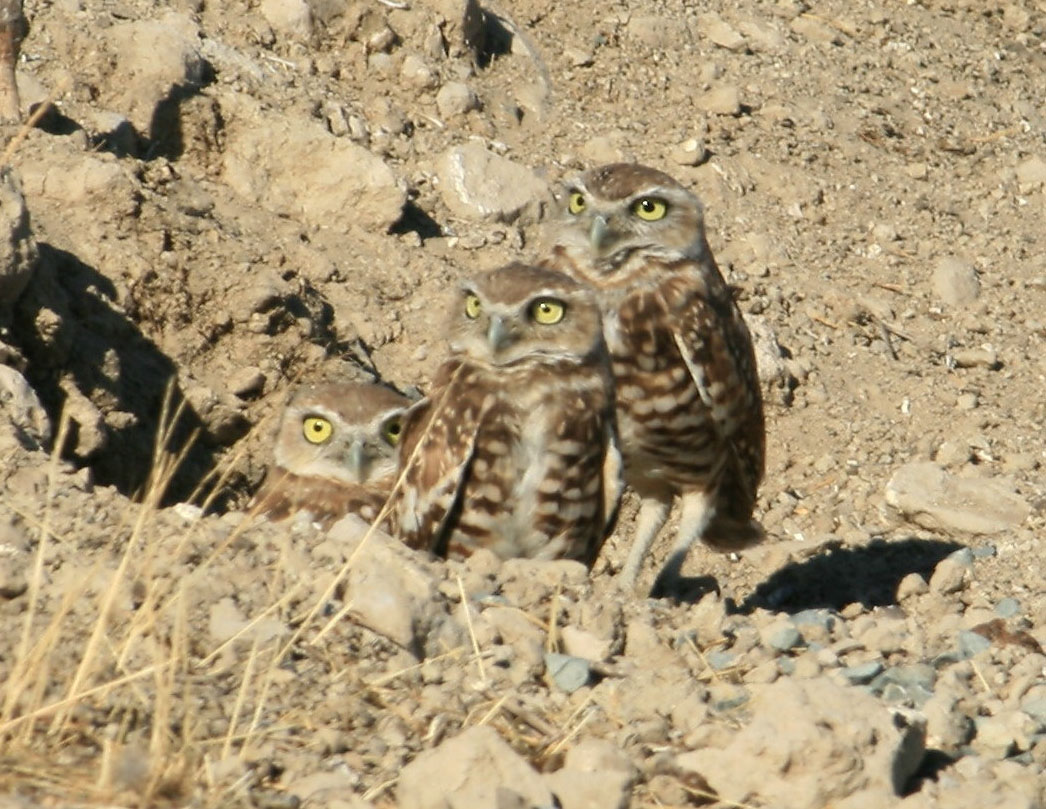
Family of burrowing owls.

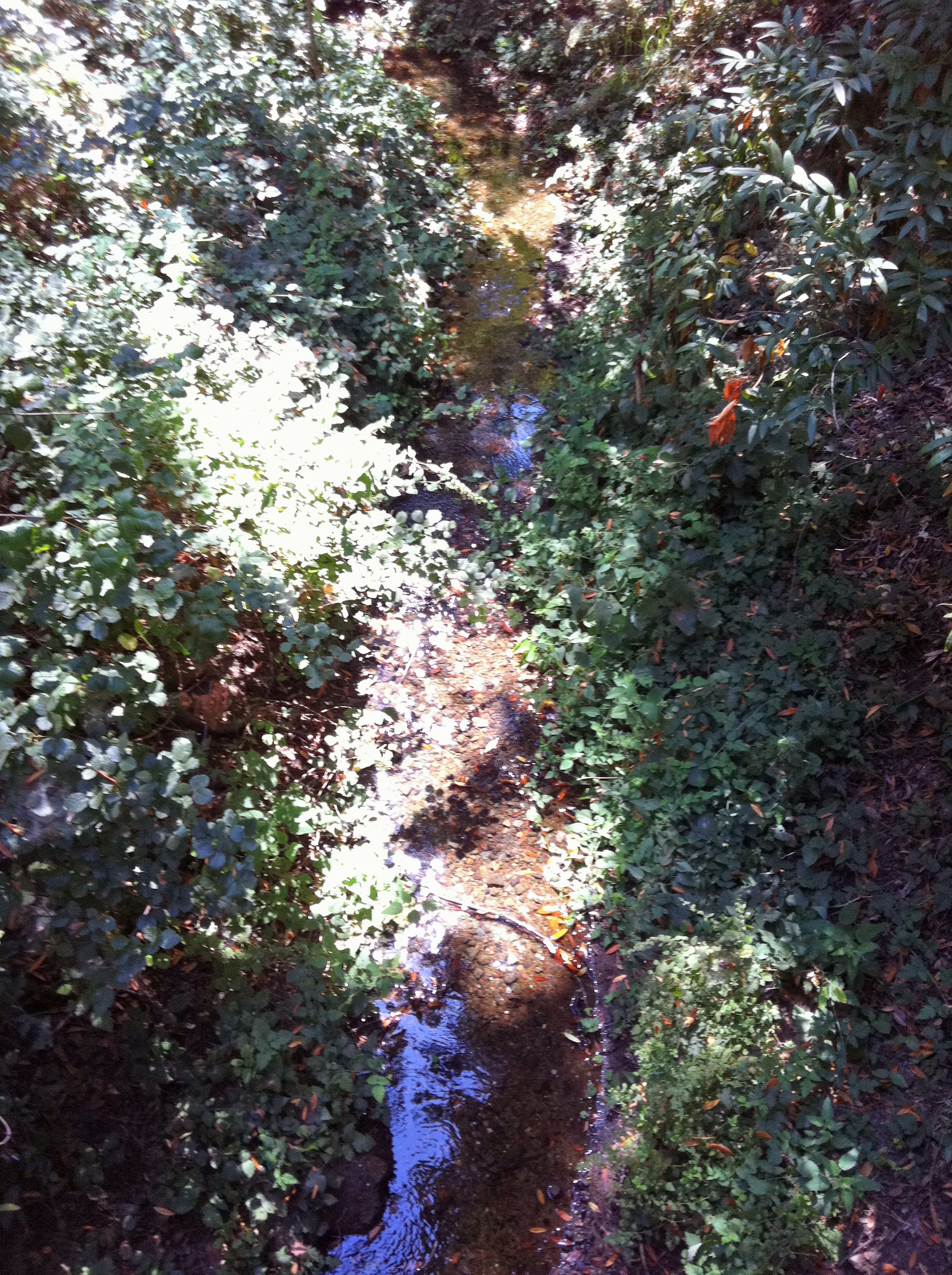
Perennial sections on the West Fork Permanente Creek persist through autumn in medium rainfall years, seen here in September 2011.

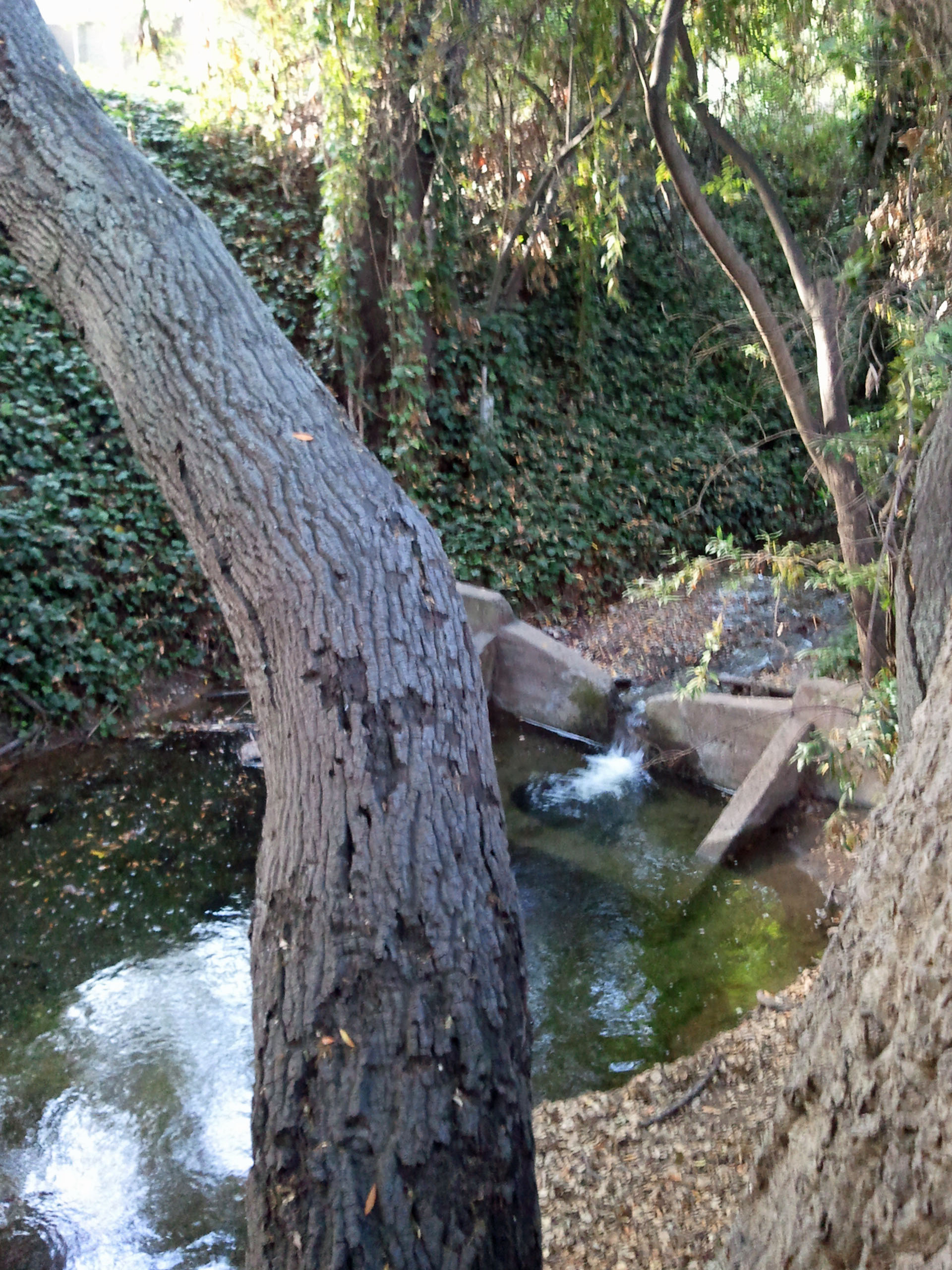
A weir on Permanente Creek in Los Altos roughly midway between Fremont Ave and Heritage Oaks Park.

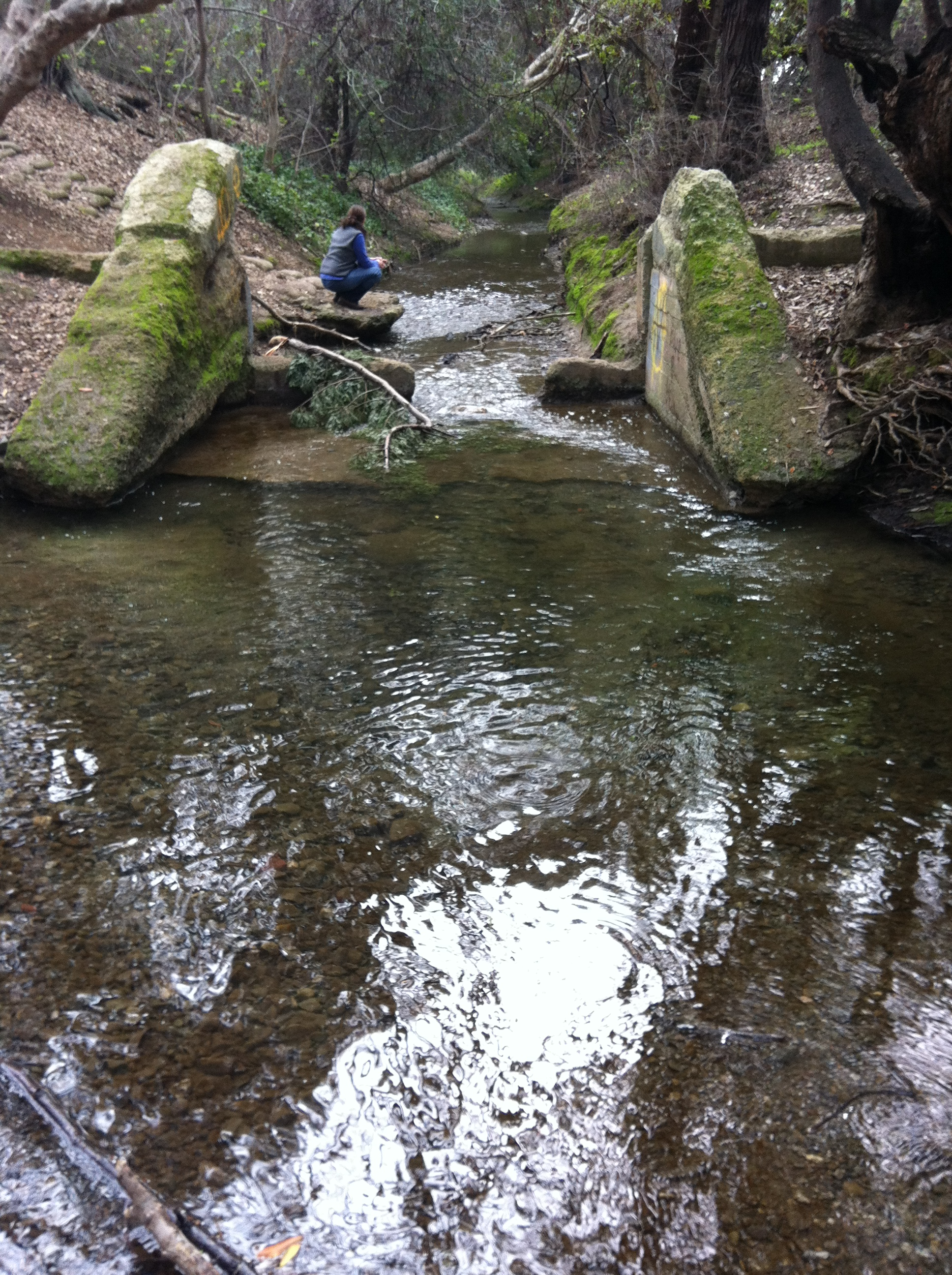
Looking upstream at 1935 weir in Permanente Creek in Heritage Oaks Park.

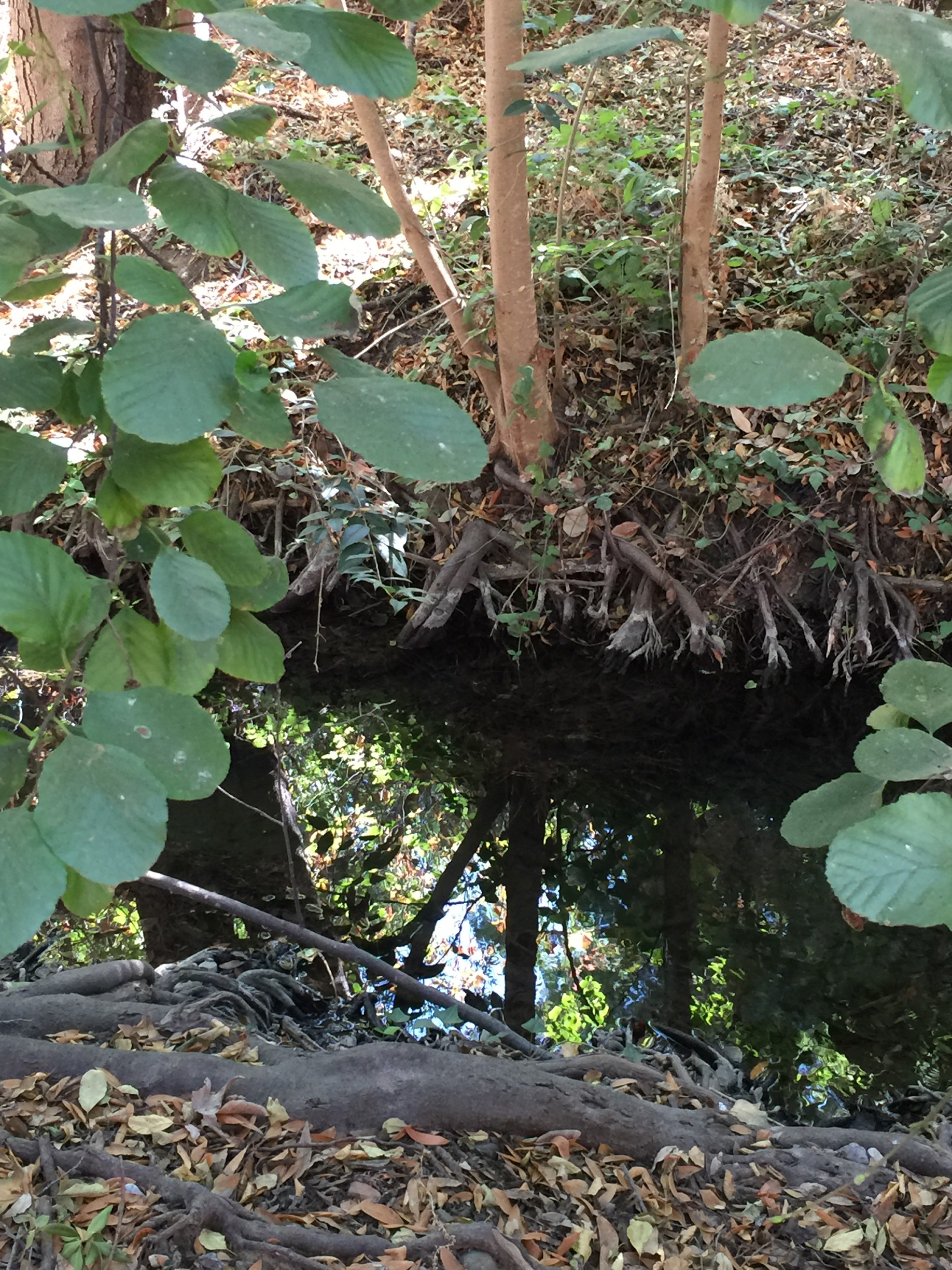
Mature (see dark exposed roots) native white alder (Alnus rhombifolia) in perennial section of Permanente Creek, October 8, 2016.

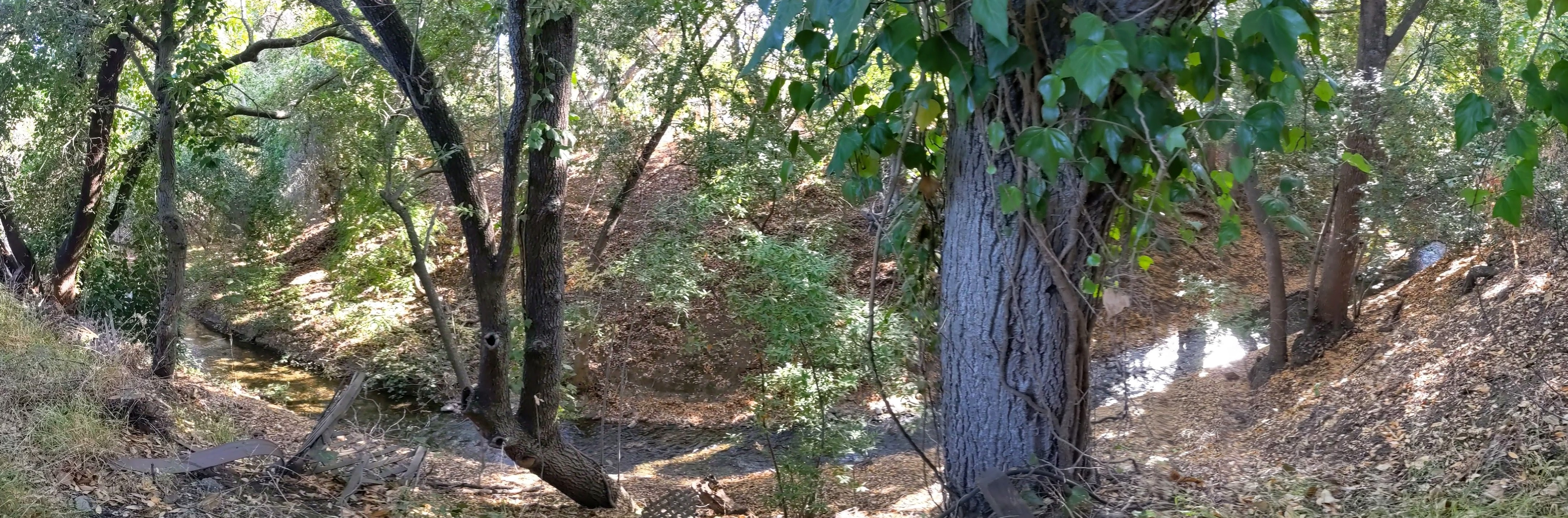
Below Fremont Avenue

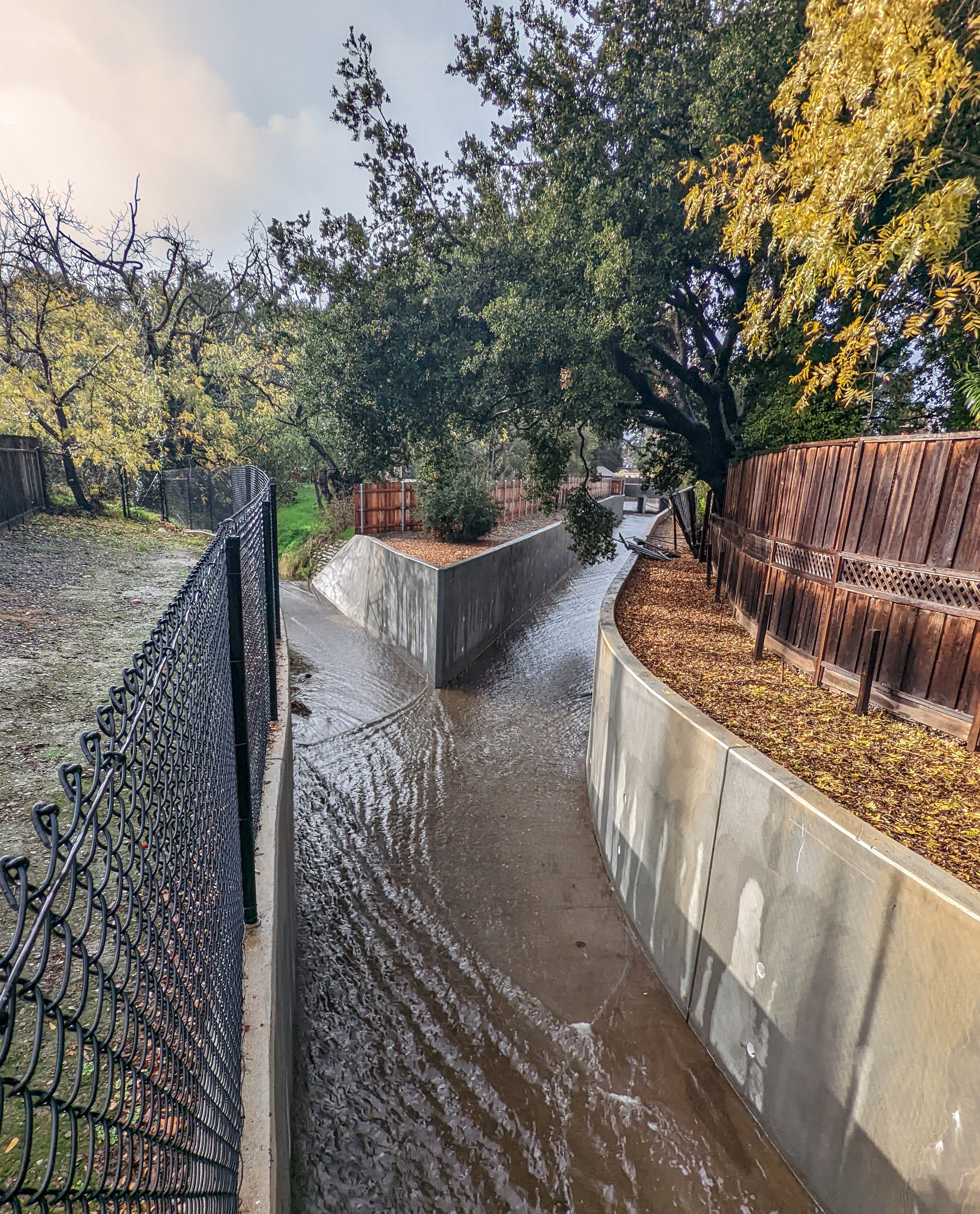
The confluence of Hale Creek (right) and the reduced Permanente Creek (left) in Los Altos, viewed from Mountain View.

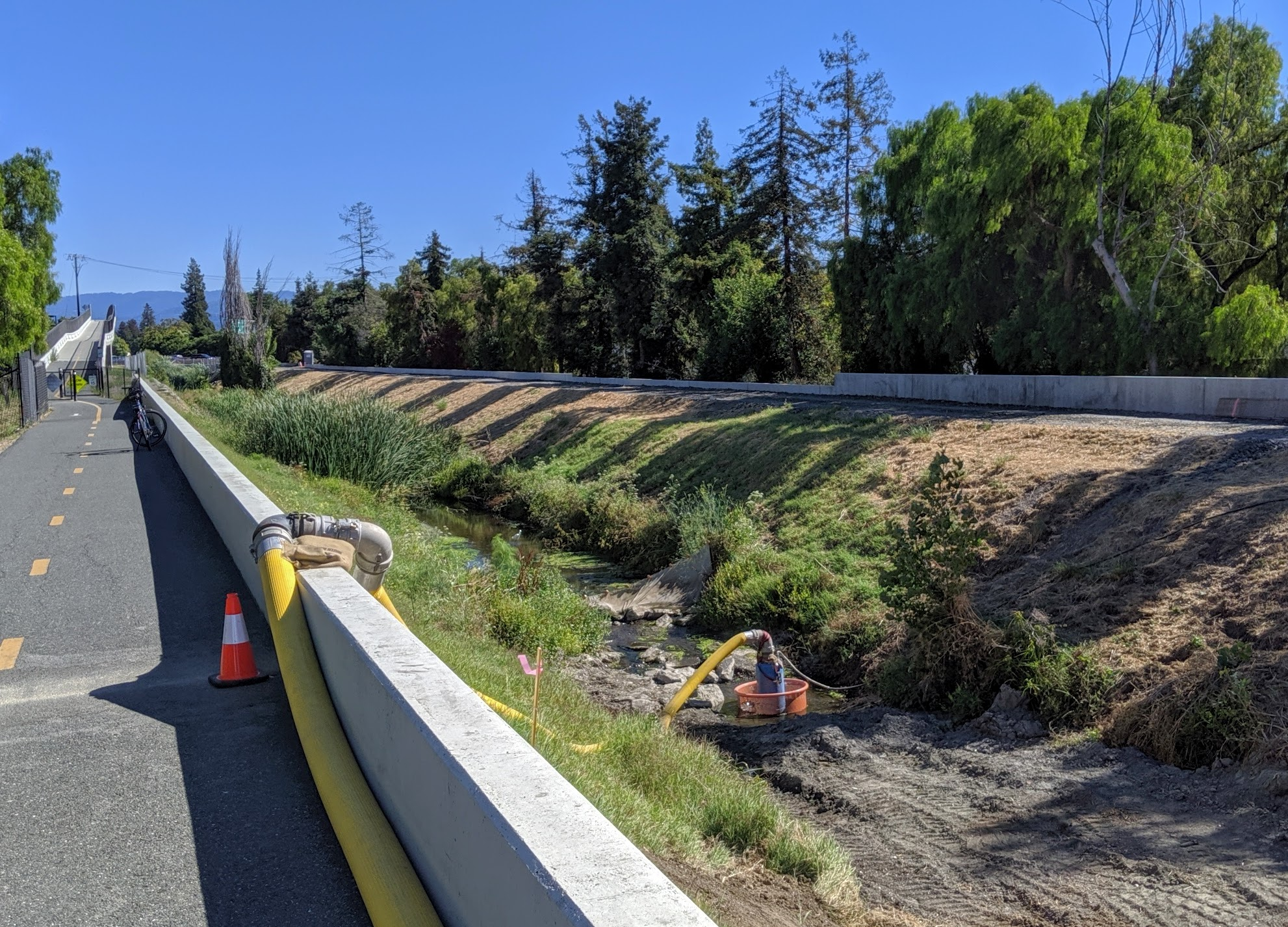
In July, 2019, the entire flow of the creek is diverted through a hose for creekbed weed cleanout by the Google campus.

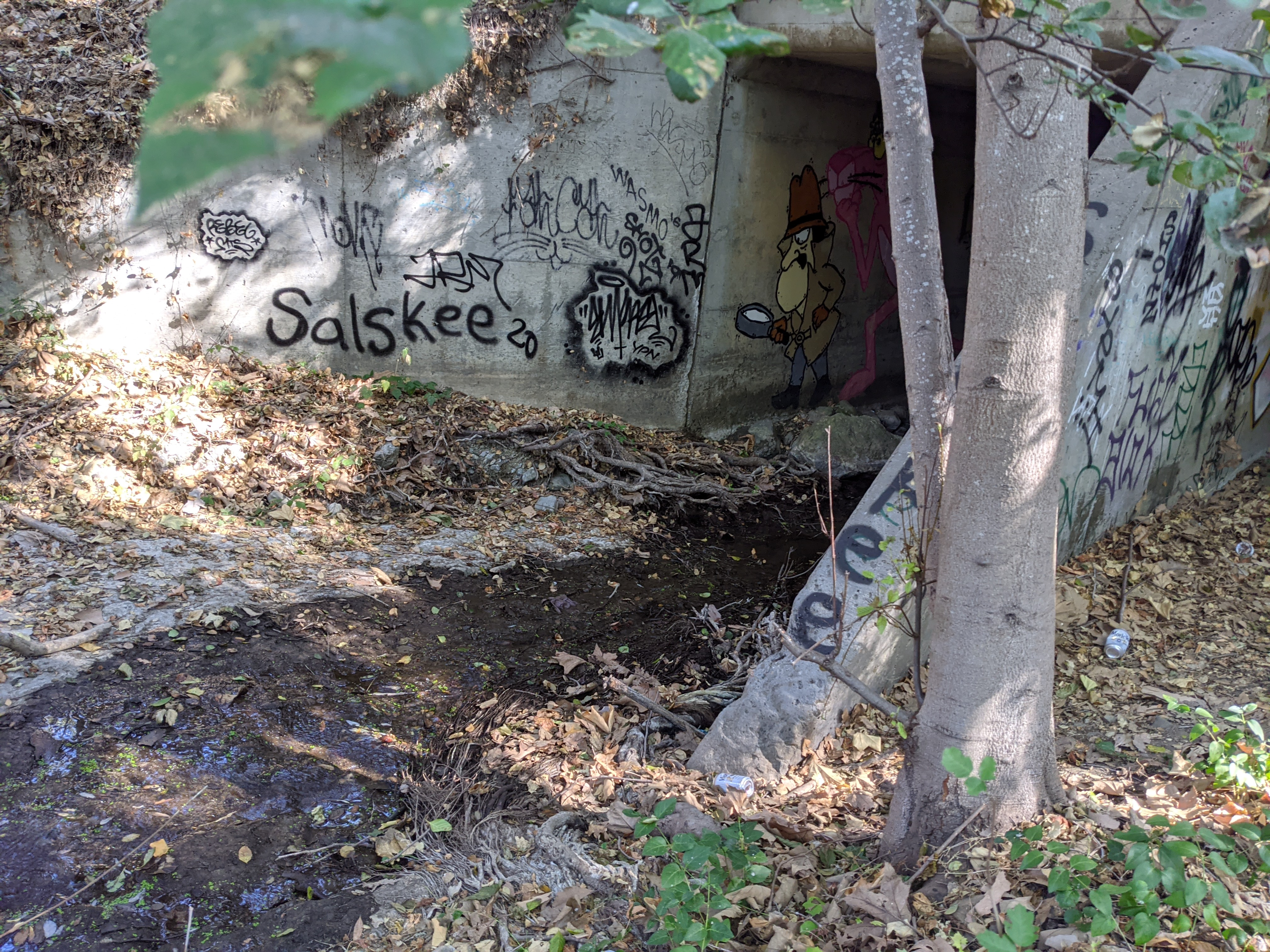
Permanente Creek as it exits Rancho San Antonio, flowing through the culvert beneath I-280, on the border of Los Altos.

== See also ==
- List of watercourses in the San Francisco Bay Area
