= Rancho San Antonio County Park =

County park in Santa Clara County, California, United States

Rancho San Antonio County Park and Open Space Preserve
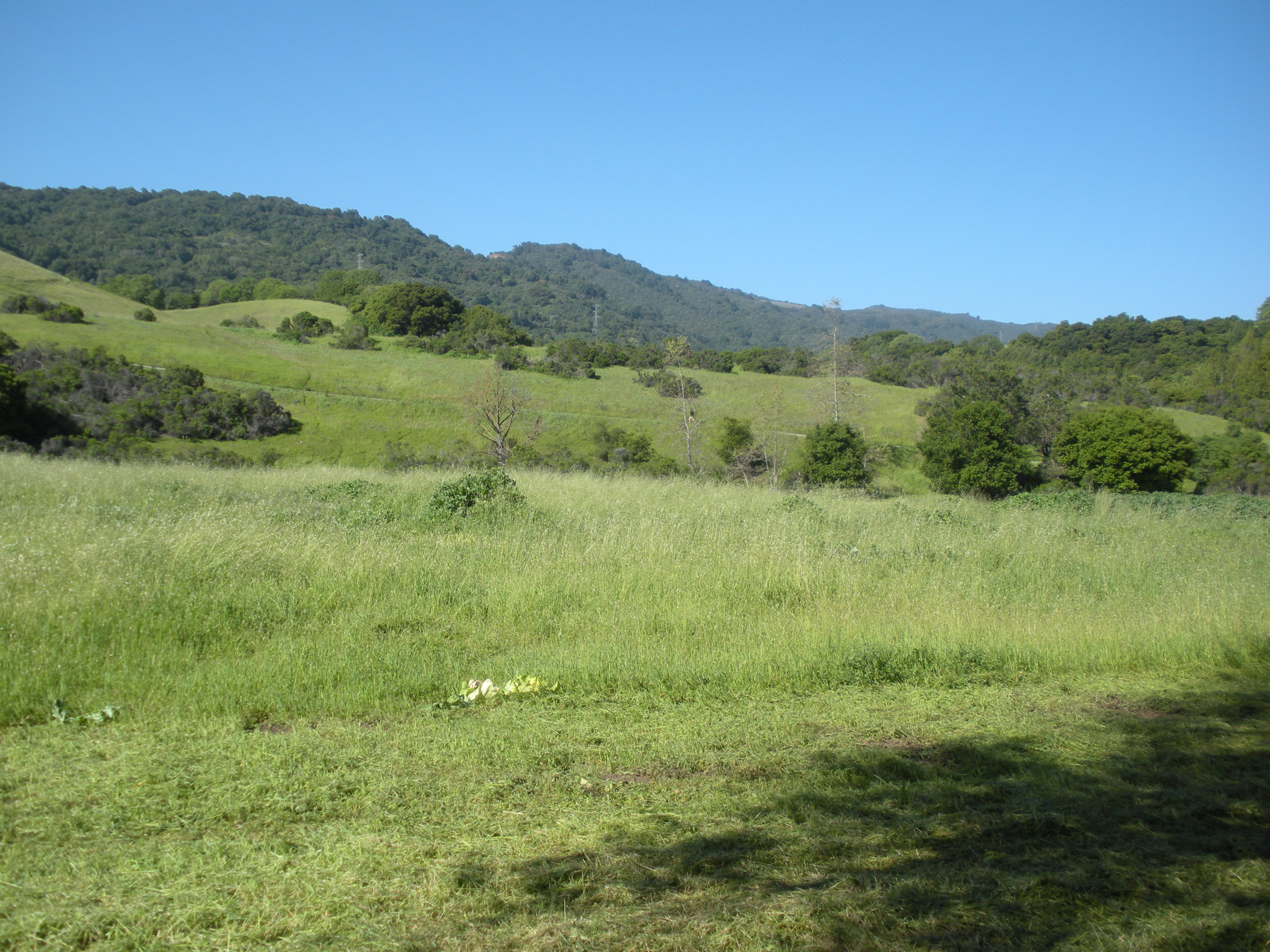
- A meadow grasslands in Rancho San Antonio County Park.

- Location within California Location within the United States
- Location: Santa Clara County, California, United States
- Nearest city: Cupertino, California
- Coordinates: 37°19′52″N 122°5′34″W
- Area: 4,277 acres (17.31 km^{2})
- Governing body: Midpeninsula Regional Open Space District
- Website: Open Space Preserve and County Park

Rancho San Antonio County Park and Rancho San Antonio Open Space Preserve are a conjoined public recreational area in the Santa Cruz Mountains, in the northwest quadrant of Santa Clara County, California. The County Park is bordered by Los Altos with some parts of the eastern part of the County Park in western Cupertino. The Open Space Preserve is on the west side of the County Park, also bordered by Los Altos Hills, Monte Bello Open Space Preserve, and the Permanente Quarry.

The Midpeninsula Regional Open Space District manages both the 3988 acre Open Space Preserve and the 289 acre County Park.

This article covers both Rancho San Antonio County Park and Rancho San Antonio Open Space Preserve.

== History ==
The Ohlone Indians lived in the area for over 3,000 years prior to the arrival of the Spanish. A large village, known as Partacsi, was located in the general area.

In March 1776, Juan Bautista de Anza led the first overland expedition to San Francisco Bay from Monterey through this area. In de Anza's diary on March 25, 1776, he states that he "arrived at the arroyo of San Joseph Cupertino (now Stevens Creek), which is useful only for travelers. Here we halted for the night, having come eight leagues in seven and a half hours. From this place we have seen at our right the estuary which runs from the port of San Francisco." A prominent hill between Permanente and Stevens Creeks is referred to as "De Anza's Knoll" and marks the location where the explorer first spotted the Bay.

Governor Alvarado granted Rancho San Antonio to Juan Prado Mesa in 1839. Mesa had been a soldier at the San Francisco Presidio since 1828. In 1853, William A. Dana, a former seafarer and merchant, purchased the Rancho. In 1923, the Catholic Church purchased what had become the Snyder Ranch and in 1926 constructed Saint Joseph's College and the Maryknoll Seminary. Saint Joseph's College was demolished after sustaining heavy damage in the 1989 Loma Prieta earthquake. The Maryknoll Seminary, with its oriental motif, stands east of the park across Cristo Rey Drive. The Santa Clara County Parks Department purchased 130 acres in 1977 and another 35 acres in 1981 from St. Joseph's Seminary. The Park's improvements were constructed in the early 1980s with additional improvements completed in 1993.

== Habitat and conservation ==
Several ecosystems exist in the park and preserve. In canyons, bay trees and big-leaf maples form shady groves. Along creeks, several species of willow grow, and cottonwoods are found in a couple areas. On cooler, north-facing slopes, oaks and bays form a forest. On hotter, south-facing slopes, chaparral scrub of chamise, manzanita, and birch-leaf mountain mahogany predominates. Douglas-fir, common west of the crest of the Santa Cruz Mountains, can be seen as lone trees above the Rogue Valley trail, and along the Black Mountain trail; they are the only conifer in the park. Ridges support grassland and scattered oaks.

The Open Space Preserve protects the watersheds of West Branch Permanente Creek and its Ohlone Creek tributary. West Branch Permanente Creek begins on the east side of 1,253-foot Ewing Hill, and runs easterly until it reaches the connector from the Chamise and Rogue Valley Trails where an earthen dam forms High Meadow Pond (aka Rogue Valley Pond). Below the pond, the West Branch is joined by 1.7 mile long Ohlone Creek at Deer Hollow Farm and continues on its run (3.2 mile total) to join the Permanente Creek mainstem 1/2 mile south of Interstate 280. West Fork Permanente Creek and its Wildcat Canyon tributary flow intermittently in summer and fall. Permanente Creek flows year round along the approximately 2 mile stretch in the County Park. The Permanente riparian corridor is crucial for wildlife survival, providing food and water as well as the ability to migrate through suburban areas relatively undisturbed.

Rancho San Antonio is home to native species such as deer, mountain lion and bobcat. The big cats are tracked and thus far have posed no threat to humans. Visitors are warned of the presence of the animals with signs at the entrance to the preserve and various trail map stations. The Rancho San Antonio land preserve is one of the few remaining tracts of land in Silicon Valley where native animals can roam free.

Along with deer, other commonly seen animals are California quail, cottontail rabbits, crows, hawks, jays, LBBs (little brown birds), lizards, squirrels, turkeys, voles, white tailed kites, woodpeckers. Less common, reclusive, or seasonal are blue herons, butterflies, California slender salamanders, coyotes, egrets, frogs, gopher snakes, jackrabbits, newts, rattlesnakes, skunks, tarantulas.

Star Thistle is an invasive species growing prolifically in the meadows and along sunny trail sides in the park and the preserve.

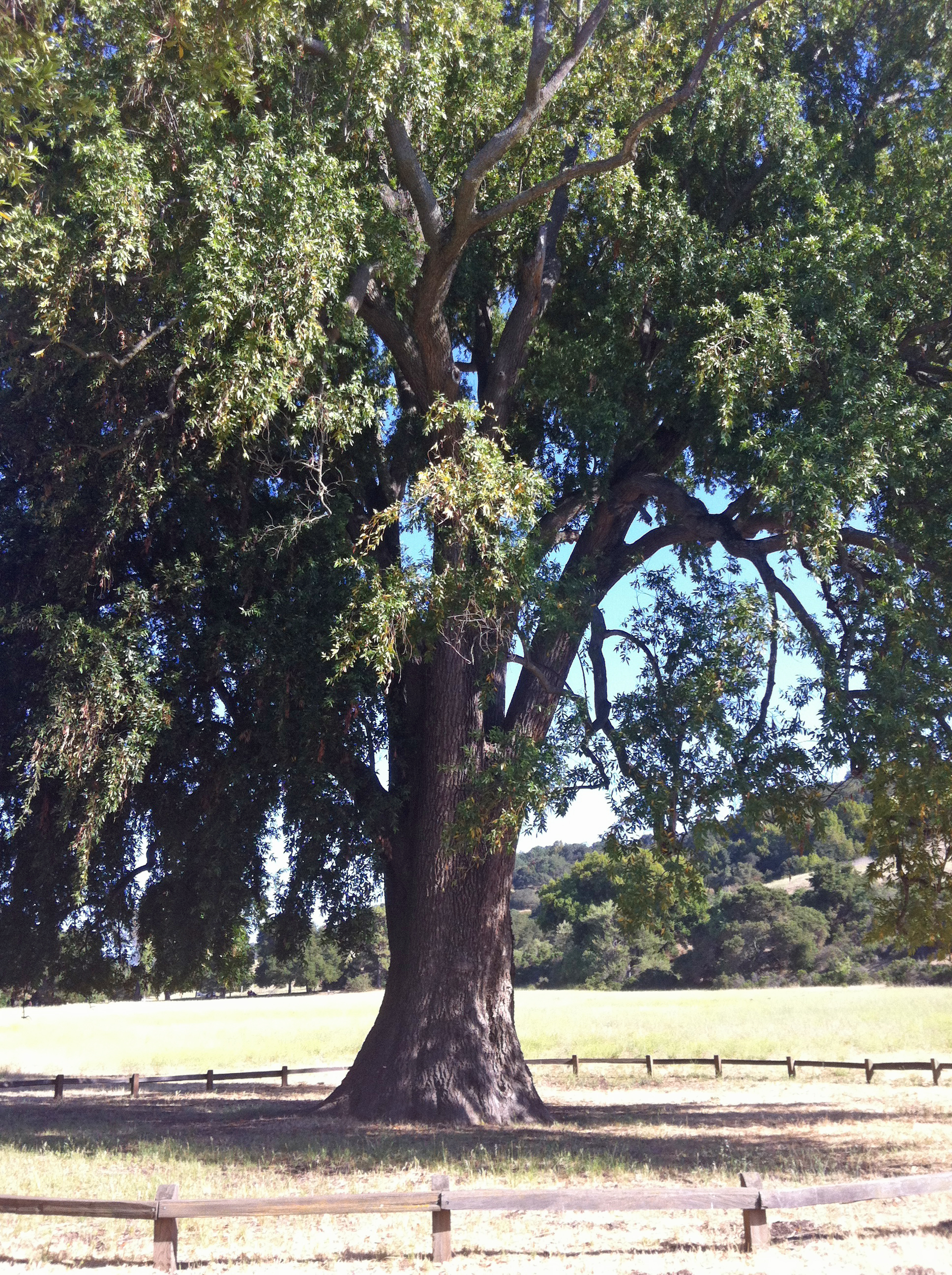
Giant California Bay Laurel near Permanente Creek in Rancho San Antonio County Park

The State's tallest and third largest California bay laurel tree (Umbellularia californica), estimated to be over 200 years old, grows in Rancho San Antonio County Park. The tree was protected in 2004 with the addition of fencing and by the removal of a nearby handball court. At the time it was 126 feet tall, its canopy spread was 118 feet, and the trunk circumference was 30 feet. In 1869, the wood of a California Bay Laurel was used for the “Last Tie” connecting North America's first transcontinental railroad. The tree's leaves are highly aromatic and its small yellow flowers bloom between December and April, important to bees at a time when few other plants are in bloom.

== Deer Hollow Farm ==
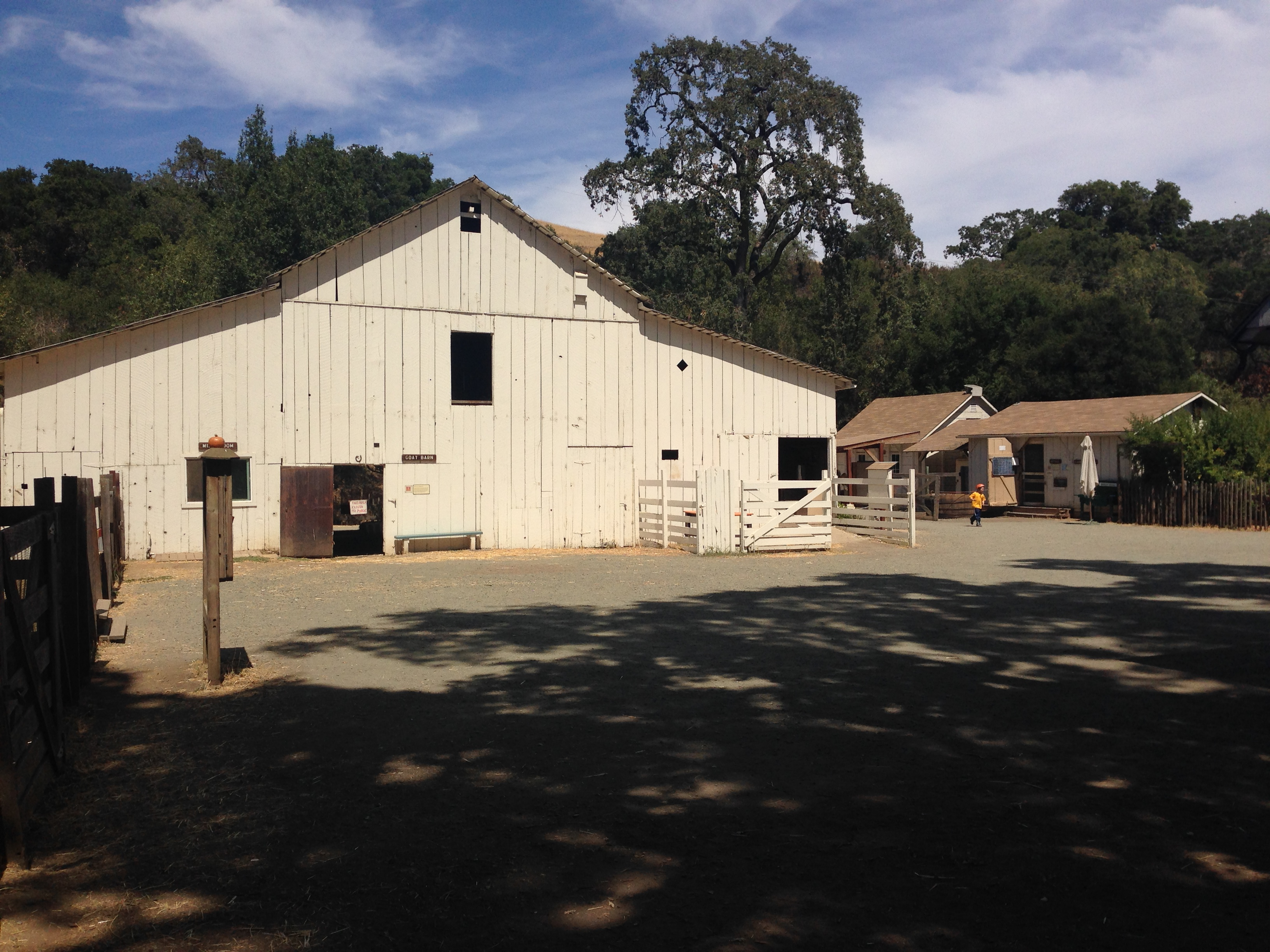
Deer Hollow Farm barn

Deer Hollow Farm is an educational center where the public can observe, study and participate in a working farm, funded by a unique collaboration between the City of Mountain, Midpeninsula Regional Open Space Distract, Santa Clara County, and the Friends of Deer Hollow Farm. The 170-year-old Farm covers ten acres and stands as a reminder of Santa Clara County's agricultural history. In the tradition of a working homestead, Deer Hollow Farm continues to produce food on-site. The farm is home to a variety of animals including chickens, ducks, geese, rabbits, goats, sheep, pigs and a cow. Farm fresh eggs and seasonal orchard produce are for sale when available.[4] It is a one-mile easy walk west from the Rancho parking lots along the West Fork Permanente Creek. The restored Grant Ranch Cabin has been furnished to represent living conditions in the late 1800s. The Deer Hollow Farm section of the Rancho San Antonio land preserve is managed by the City of Mountain View recreation division. The city manages all Farm programs and ensures that no further development takes place on the land. The city of Mountain View is instrumental in the preservation of the area and protects the environment against human intervention.

The historic open air hay barn rests at the north end of the farm. Visitors can rest and have picnics at the many wooden picnic tables available for public use. Visitors may also take self-guided tours of the surrounding area, which includes the livestock pens. Although the public cannot interact directly with the farm animals, they are able to observe them from a short distance. In addition, an environmentally sustainable vegetable garden neighbors the open air hay barn. Deer Hollow Farm volunteers maintain the garden and plant seasonal vegetables. This garden is utilized as part of the farm's education program.

As part of Deer Hollow Farm's commitment to environmental education, including sustainable farming and food growth, the farm offers a variety of educational programs for a range of ages. These programs include a Nature center, which is housed in an old apple shed (one of the original 1850s buildings), School Year Classes for kindergarten through fifth graders, which offer farm and garden education, exploration of the wilderness preserve, Ohlone Indian education, and Summer Wilderness Camps for children in grades one through nine which encourage exploration of the preserve and hands-on learning.

Deer Hollow Farm is supported through the non-profit organization Friends of Deer Hollow Farm. This organization's mission is to support the farm as a working homestead as well as environmental education through grants, donations and fundraising activities. FODHF was formed in 1994. As the last working homestead in Silicon Valley, it is important that Deer Hollow Farm be preserved and maintained. Friends of Deer Hollow Farm supports Deer Hollow Farm by offering student scholarships, funding the care and feed of the ~100 animals, and contributing to a variety of farm enhancement projects and operational needs. There are over 100,000 visitors to Deer Hollow Farm each year, and 5,000 local children participate in the variety of camps and activities offered year round. The extent to which visitors utilize the open space preserve shows how important it is to the Silicon Valley community.

== Recreation ==
The 29 miles (47 km) of hiking trails in Rancho San Antonio are very popular with walkers, hikers, and joggers. Full parking lots are the norm on weekend mornings. Most of the County Park is between 400 and 500 feet of elevation, so most trails in the park are on level ground. Walkers of all ages use most of these trails. The Open Space Preserve goes from about 400 feet to almost 2800 feet at Black Mountain, with much longer trails, providing more strenuous hikes and runs. The park and open space preserve contain various hikes such as the Chamise Trail which leads to the Duveneck Windmill Pasture Area and connects to the Black Mountain Trail which climbs to the summit of Black Mountain. Other trails provide shorter easier loops.

Five picnic tables with charcoal bar-b-q stands are located at the south end of the North Meadow in the County Park.

Non-gas powered RC model aircraft enthusiasts use the South Meadow in the County Park next to the second parking lot.

Bicycles are restricted to designated trails only - basically pavement only, no dirt trails - and are not permitted west of Deer Hollow Farm.

Within the County Park, equestrians are allowed on the equestrian staging area, the PG&E Trail, and the Hammond-Snyder Loop Trail. Almost all 24 miles (39 km) miles of trails in the Open Space Preserve are open equestrians.

=== Access & Parking ===
The easternmost entrance to the County Park is 0.3 miles (0.48 km) from North Foothill Blvd, on Cristo Rey Drive. Parking for this entrance is on Cristo Rey Drive on either side of Kring Way / Cristo Rey Pl. 0.6 miles (0.97 km) further west on Cristo Rey Drive is the main entrance to the park, with about 300 spaces in five parking lots, plus room for several horse trailers in the first lot. The Rhus Ridge parking lot has about 15 spaces but no room for horse trailers. Pedestrian access is also available at Mora Drive and Ravensbury Avenue in Los Altos Hills as well as Black Mountain Trail from Monte Bello Open Space Preserve. The Quarry Trail crosses private property on a district easement.

=== Facilities ===
At the first parking lot there is a water fountain and horse watering trough. A building with flush toilets and water fountain opened in the "Equestrian" parking lot in late 2018. Water fountains are also located at the last parking lot in the County Park, near the 5 picnic tables in the North Meadow, and at Deer Hollow Farm. Flush toilets are located at the last parking lot. Pit toilets are just beyond Deer Hollow Farm. Otherwise, no potable water or toilets are available past Deer Hollow Farm.
