= Rancho Los Médanos =

Mexican land grant in California

Coordinates: 38.010°N 121.900°W

Rancho Los Médanos (from Spanish, lit. 'Sand Dunes Ranch') was a 8,859-acre (35.85 km^{2}) Mexican land grant in present-day Contra Costa County, California given in 1839 by Governor Juan Alvarado to Jose Antonio Mesa and Jose Miguel Garcia. The land was located at the junction of the San Joaquin River and the Sacramento River, extending eastward along the south shore of Suisun Bay to Antioch. The name "los medanos" is derived from the sand hills located along the San Joaquin River on its northern boundary. The rancho lands included present-day Antioch and Pittsburg.

== History ==
The two league Rancho Los Medanos was granted in 1835 to Jose Antonio Mesa and Jose Miquel Garcia. Jose Antonio Mesa was the son of Corporal José Valerio Mesa who came to California with the Anza Expedition. Jose Antonio Mesa's son, Juan Prado Mesa, was the grantee of Rancho San Antonio.

Mesa and Garcia sold the southern half of their rancho to Colonel Jonathan D. Stevenson in 1849, and the northern half to James Walsh, Michael Murray, and Ellen Fallon in 1850. There was confusion about the orientation of the grant, and in 1851 Stevenson arranged an exchange of deeds, whereby he got the west half of the rancho, and Walsh, Murray, and Fallon got the east half.

With the cession of California to the United States following the Mexican-American War, the 1848 Treaty of Guadalupe Hidalgo provided that the land grants would be honored. A claim was filed with the Public Land Commission in 1853, and the grant was patented to Jonathan D. Stevenson et al. in 1872. A claim for Rancho Los Medanos filed in 1853 by James Enright, Michael Murphy, and Ellen Fallon, was rejected.

Colonel Jonathan Drake Stevenson (1800–1894) was the commanding officer of the 1st Regiment of New York Volunteers, part of the American occupation army force that landed in California in 1847. Stevenson and others laid out a site for a town they called "New York of the Pacific", and Rancho Los Medanos is sometimes known as the "New York Ranch". The name of the settlement was changed to Pittsburg in 1911.

Stevenson sold the rancho to the San Francisco banking firm of Louis Pioche, who in turn sold it in 1872 to L. L. Robinson. Lester Ludyah Robinson (1828–1892) was a California pioneer railroad builder, mining operator and land speculator. Robinson never married and at the urging of his sister Sophia Robinson Cutter, wrote a new will in 1891 in which he left the rancho to her. In 1900 the Bank of California, which held the mortgage on the ranch, foreclosed on the property. Charles Appleton Hooper purchased the ranch property in 1900.

== See also ==
- Ranchos of Contra Costa County, California
- Rancho Los Méganos
- Los Medanos College
