= Marcus & Millichap =

American real estate company

Marcus & Millichap, Inc.
- Type: Public
- Traded as: NYSE: MMI; S&P 600 component; Russell 2000 Index component
- Industry: Commercial real estate
- Founded: 1971; 55 years ago
- Founder: George M. Marcus
- Headquarters: Calabasas, California, U.S.
- Area served: North America
- Key people: Hessam Nadji (President) & (CEO; J.D.Parker COO); Steve DeGennaro (CFO)
- Services: Commercial real estate brokerage, financing, research, advisory services
- Revenue: ▲US$755.2 million (2025)
- Net income: ▲ −US$1.91 million (2025)
- Number of employees: Over 1,800 (2025)
- Website: marcusmillichap.com

Marcus & Millichap, Inc. is an American company that provides real estate brokerage, mortgage brokerage, research, and advisory services in the U.S. and Canada in the field of commercial property. It popularized the practice of listing properties exclusively with one brokerage firm. The company has over 1,800 employees in more than 80 offices across the U.S. and Canada.

== History ==
The company was founded in Palo Alto in 1971 by George M. Marcus.

William Millichap was one of the first salespeople Marcus hired, and was made a partner in 1976. The company was incorporated in California on August 26, 1976 as G. M. Marcus & Company, and was renamed as Marcus & Millichap, Inc. in August 1978.

In 2013, it became a public company via an initial public offering.

In December 2015, Marcus & Millichap expanded its institutional property market in the areas of office and industrial with the creation of Institutional Property Advisors (IPA)

In May 2016, Hessam Nadji was named Chief Executive Officer.

In 2018, Marcus & Millichap expanded its Canadian presence with the acquisition of McGill Commercial. In the same year, Marcus & Millichap acquired Primecorp in Canada.

In 2019, Marcus & Millichap further expanded in Canada when it acquired Form Real Estate Advisors

In 2020, Marcus & Millichap expanded its Marcus & Millichap Capital Corp (MMCC) division with the acquisitions of Metropolitan Capital Advisors, Mission Capital Advisors and LMI Capital.

In March 2025, Marcus & Millichap's Institutional Property Advisors (IPA) Capital Markets division appointed Onorio Lucchese as senior managing director in its Toronto office to enhance cross-border capital-raising efforts and support the firm's strategic expansion within the Canadian market.

In June 2025, Marcus & Millichap brokered the $6.65 million sale of Ellery Apartments, a 14-unit property built in 1880 in Harvard Square, Cambridge, marking its first change in ownership in over forty years.
