= Myron Norton =

American lawyer (1822–1886)

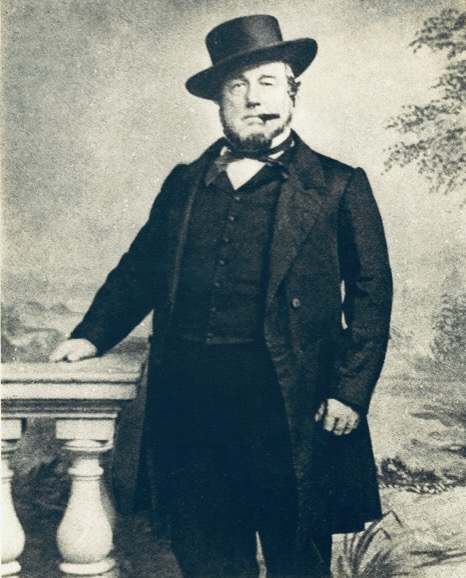
- Myron Norton (1822–1886)
- Born: September 23, 1822; Bennington, Vermont, US
- Died: April 16, 1886 (aged 63); Los Angeles, California, US
- Burial place: Evergreen Cemetery
- Military career
- Allegiance: United States Army
- Branch: 1st Regiment of New York Volunteers
- Service years: Mexican–American War

Myron Norton (1822–1886), was an American attorney, and an officer in the 1st Regiment of New York Volunteers, fighting in the Mexican–American War, and remained in California afterward to become active in both San Francisco and Los Angeles legal circles and politics. He drafted California's first state constitution.

== Early life ==
Norton was born in Bennington, Vermont, on September 23, 1822, and studied at Harvard University.

== Military ==
The day after he graduated from Harvard, he joined the Army and served under General Winfield Scott in the Mexican War. He then joined Jonathan D. Stevenson's 1st Regiment of New York Volunteers, with which he came to California. He was a lieutenant.

In 1850–51, the settlers were fearful of an Agua Caliente Indian "insurrection" under Chief Antonio Garra, so "Regulars and volunteers were accordingly mustered to guard against this danger." The Los Angeles volunteers were commanded by General Joshua Bean, with Norton as colonel and chief of staff. In a letter written to Governor John McDougall, Bean commended Norton for his bravery.

Later, Norton was second in command of the first legal militia organization in the state, the First California Guard, where he was commissioned a first lieutenant on July 23, 1853.

In their requisition for arms[,] the company requested that seventy-five rifles and accouterments be sent to them immediately, as there were very few arms in the Los Angeles area except what was held by bands of organized villains of the worst type. The members preferred rifles[,] as part of the time they would be engaged in cavalry routine, especially when dealing with gangs of robbers or raiding bands of Indians.

Norton was one of the organizers and was elected chairman of a "large number of citizens assembled at the Montgomery House" on December 7, 1857, to demand protection by the U.S. Army from a feared invasion of Mormon fighters through the Cajon Pass in the wake of what was called the Mountain Meadows massacre, a Mormon attack in Southern Utah upon an emigrant wagon train in September of that year.

== Legal and political ==
In 1849, Norton was in San Francisco, where he was the county's first justice of the peace and then police magistrate. He also had a law office in the Laffan Building.

In a vigilante-type trial in San Francisco, Norton was appointed to be defense attorney for a group of men called The Hounds, who were charged with serious crimes resulting from a rampage against Chilean immigrants.

As soon as news arrived from Washington, D.C., that Congress had failed to pass a bill authorizing territorial status for newly conquered California, Norton and Kimball H. Dimmick convened a committee in San Jose that nevertheless issued a call for a state constitutional convention. In March 1849 he was on a committee in San Francisco that urged the drafting of a state constitution instead of a territorial one. In a California-wide election for delegates, Norton received the second-highest number of votes, after Edward Gilbert. When work began in Monterey, Norton, as chairman of the Judiciary Committee, wrote the first draft of the constitution.

Norton resettled in Los Angeles and in 1851 was elected a judge of the Superior Court. On May 4, 1852, he was elected to the Common Council, the city's governing body. He served until May 3, 1853, and he was again elected in a special election on December 27, 1856, for a term ending May 6, 1857.

== Death ==
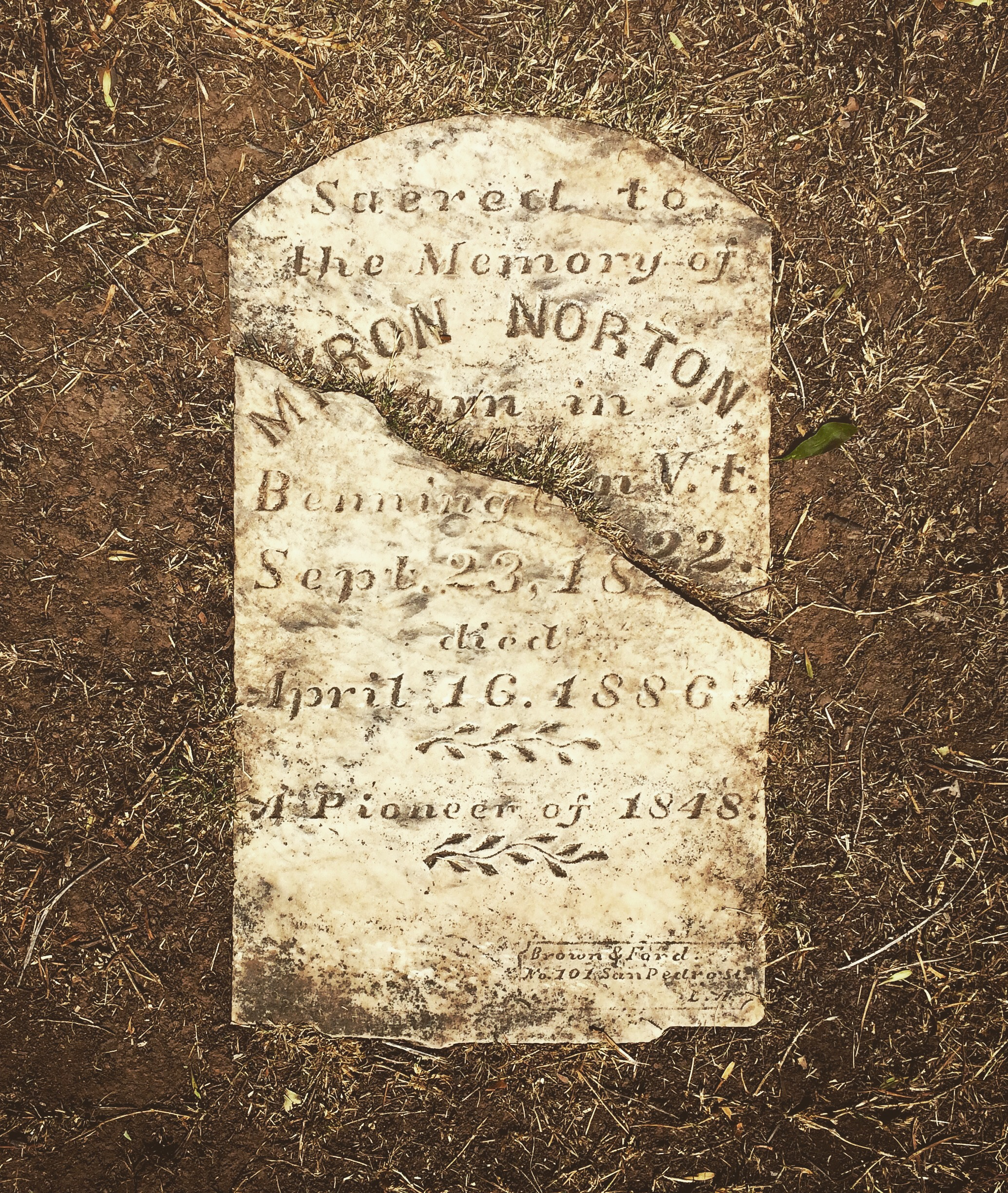
Headstone of Myron Norton at Evergreen Cemetery in Los Angeles

He died on April 16, 1886, and is buried at Evergreen Cemetery, Los Angeles, California.
