= Rancho Río de los Americanos =

Former Mexican land grant in Sacramento, California

Coordinates: 38.670°N 121.190°W

Rancho Río de los Americanos was a 35,521-acre (143.75 km^{2}) Mexican land grant in present-day Sacramento County, California given in 1844 by Governor Manuel Micheltorena to William Leidesdorff (1810–1848). The grant takes its name from Río de los Americanos, the name of the American River during the Mexican-rule era. The grant originally consisted of 8 square leagues and extended from the eastern border of John Sutter's New Helvetia (east of Sacramento) 4 leagues along the south bank of the American River, to the eastern end of present-day Folsom, and included present-day cities of Rancho Cordova and Folsom.

== History ==
William Alexander Leidesdorff, U.S. Vice Consul at the Port of San Francisco, hired a farm manager and financed construction of four adobe dwellings on the site of today's River Bend Park, near Bradshaw Road and Folsom Blvd, in the city of Rancho Cordova. Leidesdorff died suddenly three years later, on May 18, 1848, at the age of 38. He was not married and had no family in California. He died intestate, leaving a large estate of property at the dawn of the California Gold Rush.

His death came twelve days before the signing of the Treaty of Guadalupe Hidalgo and the cession of California to the United States following the Mexican-American War. Leidesdorff's vast estate passed to his mother, Anna Marie Spark, and surviving siblings, who resided in and were citizens of St. Croix, Danish West Indies, today's U.S. Virgin Islands.

Captain Joseph Libbey Folsom (1817–1855), a graduate of West Point had come to California in 1847 as Captain and Assistant Quartermaster of Jonathan D. Stevenson's 1st Regiment of New York Volunteers. He became the first Collector of the Port of San Francisco under American rule in 1848. Folsom was familiar with Leidesdorff's vast holdings and knew of his family in St. Croix. In 1849, Folsom took leave from the U.S. Army, and after stopping in New York to arrange financing, went to St. Croix, where he located some of Leidesdorff's relatives, including his mother. Anna Spark signed a note authorizing Folsom to purchase the title to her son's estate, including Leidesdorff's extensive real estate holdings in San Francisco as well as Rancho Río de los Americanos, for $75,000, with a $5,000 down payment and the remainder to be paid in two installments. When Spark realized the true value of the estate, she refused to accept further payments or to give title to Folsom. Folsom hired the law firm of Halleck, Peachy & Billings to force Spark to accept the final payments.

The State of California Senate in 1854 made an attempt to control the estate, contending that, because Spark was not an American citizen, among other legal questions, she could not inherit property in California, and hence could not transfer it to Folsom. In 1855, the California Supreme Court ruled that Spark could inherit the properties; and therefore, the title legally passed to Folsom.

The Treaty of Guadalupe Hidalgo provided that the land grants would be honored. As required by the Land Act of 1851, Folsom filed a claim for the grant with the Public Land Commission in 1852. The claim was confirmed by the Commission in 1855 and the District Court in 1857. Although clear title was tied up in court, Folsom continued to develop the grant. In 1854, Folsom began to sell parcels of the Rancho. He renamed the former Negro Bar townsite near the river Granite City, and had lots surveyed and sold. When Folsom died suddenly at the age of 38, in 1855, one month after the Commission confirmed his title to the grant, the town was renamed Folsom.

Folsom's estate was handled by his executors, Halleck, Peachy & Billings. A survey of the grant, known as the Hays survey, was completed and approved by the Surveyor General of California. Folsom had been dead three years, when, in 1858, the Department of Interior disapproved the survey. Jacob Thompson, the Secretary of the Interior, determined that the survey did not conform to either the description of the land granted by the Mexican government, the land as shown on the Diseño, or to the decree of the Court. The District Court ordered a new survey, known as the Mandeville survey; but in 1852, it reversed itself and approved the original Hays survey. However, the United States appealed this ruling to the United States Supreme Court.

In 1857 the Natoma Water and Mining Company, founded in 1851 and engaged in granite quarrying, agriculture, gold mining and hydro-electric power, purchased 5,000 acres (20.2 km^{2}) from the Folsom estate. Amos Parmalee Catlin appeared as counsel for the Natoma Water and Mining Company. The U.S. Supreme Court ruled the Hays survey valid, and the grant was patented to Joseph L. Folsom in 1864. In 1862, Horatio G. Livermore acquired the Natoma Water and Mining Company and 9,000 acres (36.4 km^{2}) of Rancho Río de los Americanos.
