= Constitution of California =

American state constitution

Constitution of the State of California Constitución del Estado de California (Spanish)
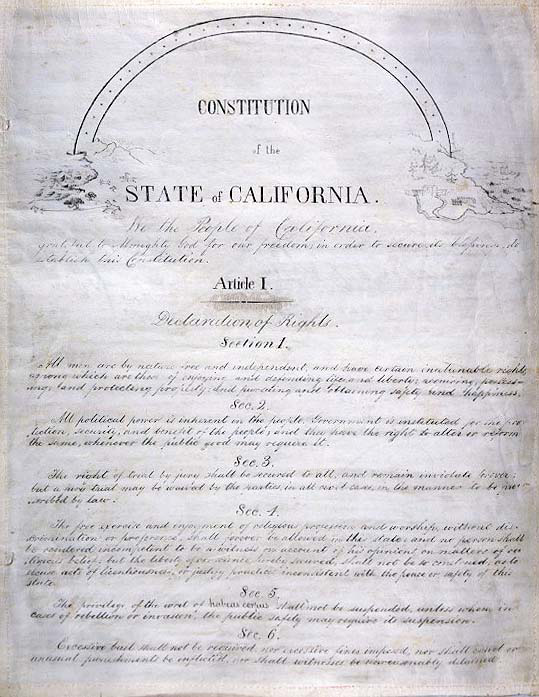
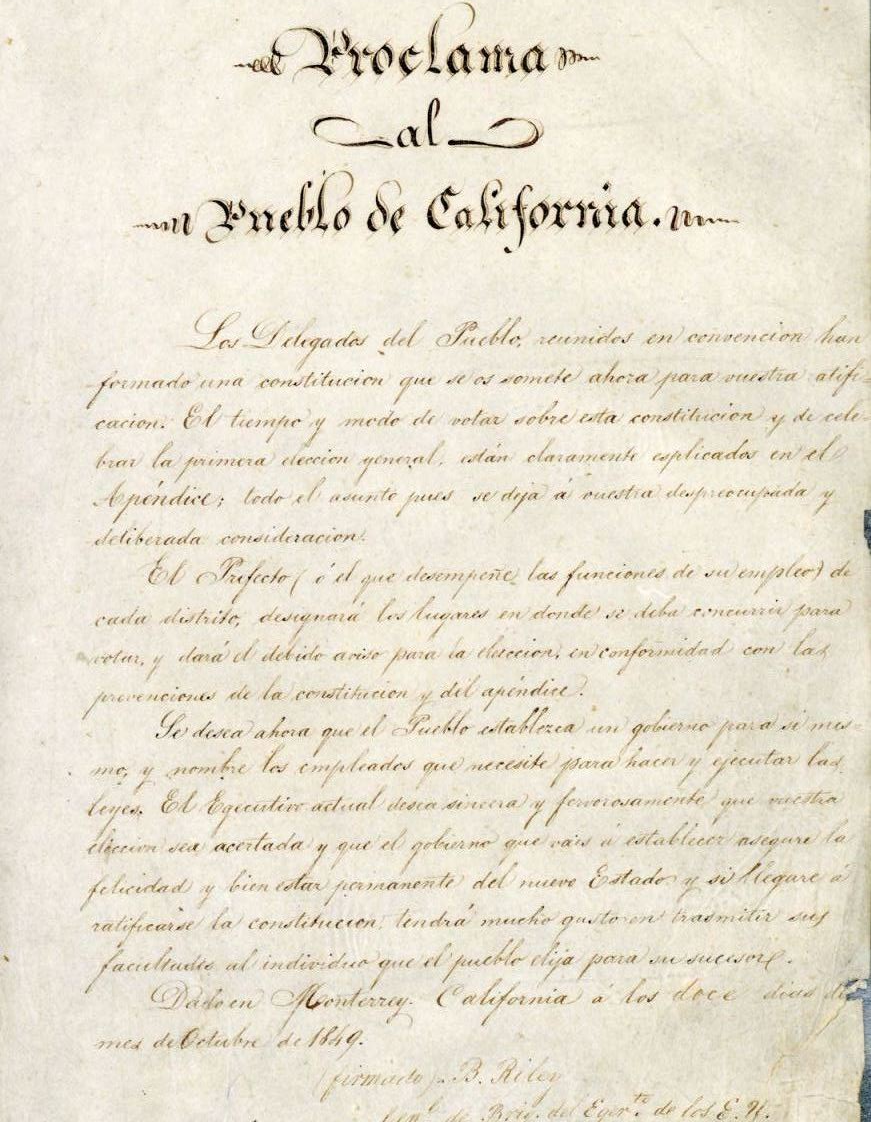
- Title pages of the original English (left) and Spanish (right) versions of the 1849 Constitution

Overview
- Jurisdiction: State of California
- Subordinate to: Supreme law of the United States
- Created: 13 October 1849
- Ratified: 7 May 1879

History
- Amendments: 514
- Location: California Capitol Museum, Sacramento, California
- Author: Monterey Convention of 1849
- Signatories: 48 delegates

The Constitution of California is the primary organizing law for the U.S. state of California, describing the duties, powers, structures and functions of the government of California. California's constitution was drafted in both English and Spanish by American pioneers, European settlers, and Californios (Hispanics of California) and adopted at the 1849 Constitutional Convention of Monterey, following the American Conquest of California and the Mexican–American War and in advance of California's admission to the Union in 1850. The constitution was heavily amended and ratified on 7 May 1879, following the Sacramento Convention of 1878–79.

Many of the individual rights clauses in the state constitution have been construed as protecting rights even broader than the United States Bill of Rights in the Federal Constitution. An example is the case of Pruneyard Shopping Center v. Robins, in which "free speech" rights beyond those addressed by the First Amendment to the United States Constitution were found in the California Constitution by the California courts. One of California's most significant prohibitions is against "cruel or unusual punishment," a stronger prohibition than the U.S. Constitution's Eighth Amendment prohibition against "cruel and unusual punishment." The Constitution also defined the states borders, and around two thirds of the commentary during constitutional convention of 1850 was spent on debating the boundaries of the state, particularly whether present day Utah should be included in the state since the mormon settlers there did not elect any delegates to the convention and due to significant doubt amongst delegates on whether Congress would admit such a large state.

In the present day, the Constitution of California is among the longest in the world. This is predominantly due to additions by California ballot propositions, which allow enacting amendments by a simple majority vote in a referendum. Since its enactment, the California constitution has been amended an average of five times each year. As a result, if California were a sovereign state, its constitution would rank as the second- or third-longest in the world by total word count. This has led politicians and political scientists to argue the procedures for amending the California constitution are too lax, creating a state constitution that is filled with irrelevant detail and incoherent policies created by conflicting majorities attempting to impose their will on each other by the ballot process.

== History ==
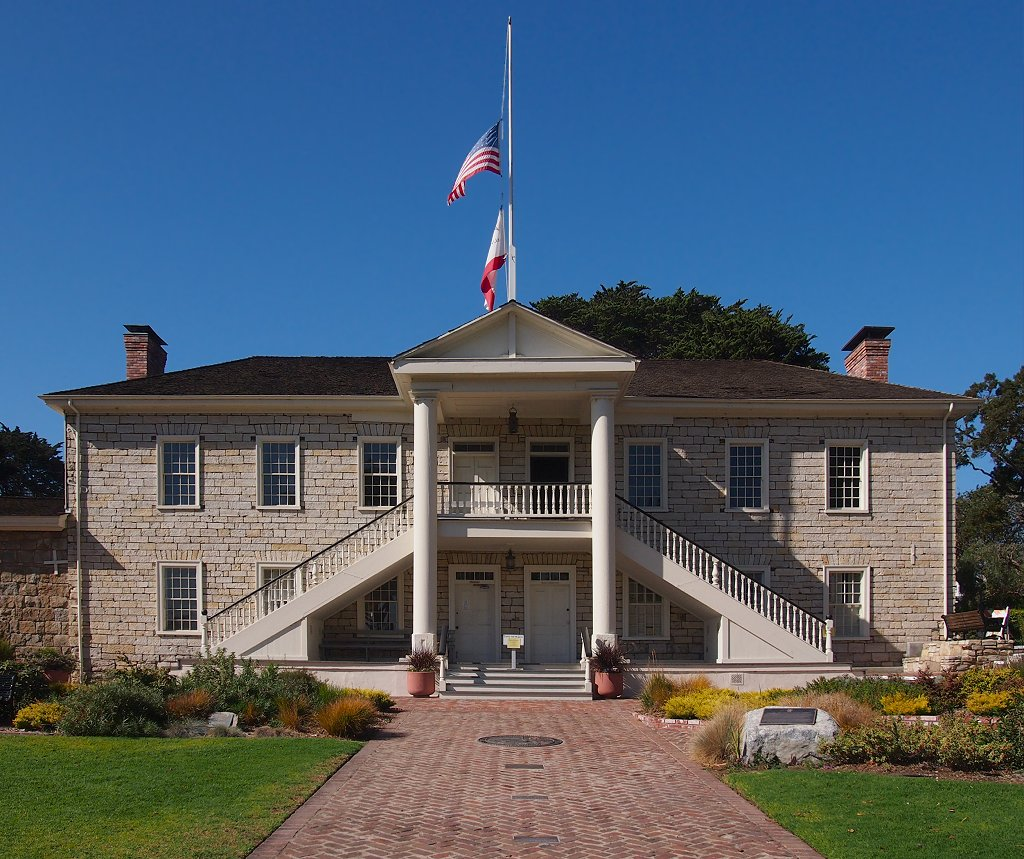
Colton Hall, in Monterey, site of the Constitutional Convention of 1849.

The Constitution of California has undergone numerous changes since its original drafting. It was rewritten from scratch several times before the drafting of the current 1879 constitution, which has itself been amended or revised (see below).

In response to widespread public disgust with the powerful railroads that controlled California's politics and economy at the start of the 20th century, Progressive Era politicians pioneered the concept of aggressively amending the state constitution by initiative in order to remedy perceived evils. From 1911, the height of the U.S. Progressive Era, to 1986, the California Constitution was amended or revised over 500 times.

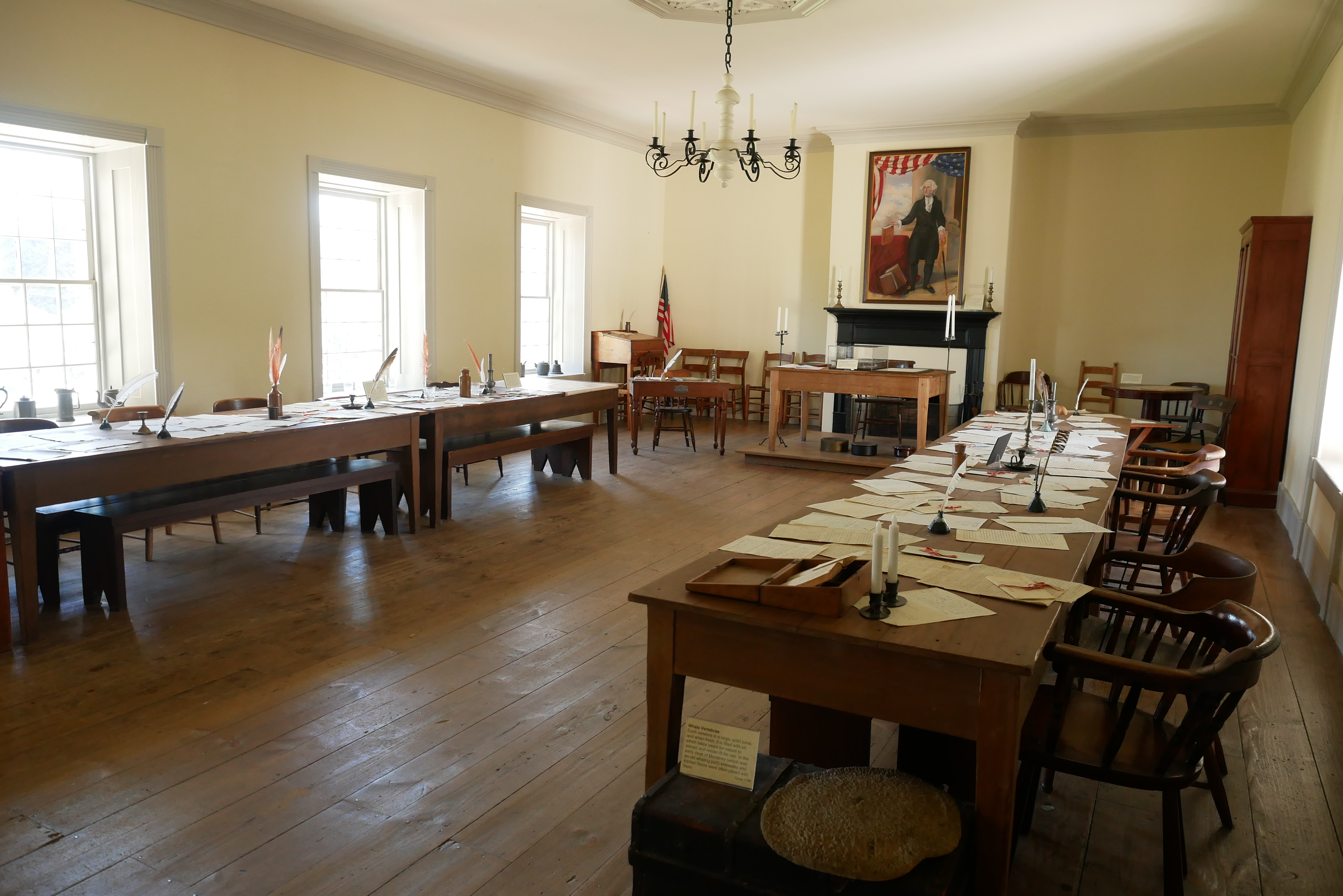
Interior of Colton Hall.

The constitution gradually became increasingly bloated, leading to abortive efforts towards a third constitutional convention in 1897, 1914, 1919, 1930, 1934 and 1947. By 1962, the constitution had grown to 75,000 words, which at that time was longer than any other state constitution but Louisiana's.

That year, the electorate approved the creation of a California Constitution Revision Commission, which worked on a comprehensive revision of the constitution from 1964 to 1976. The electorate ratified the commission's revisions in 1966, 1970, 1972, and 1974, but rejected the 1968 revision, whose primary substantive effect would have been to make the state's superintendent of schools into an appointed rather than an elected official. The Commission ultimately removed about 40,000 words from the constitution.

== Provisions ==
The California Constitution is one of the longest in the world. The length has been attributed to a variety of factors, such as the influence of previous Mexican civil law, a lack of faith in elected officials and the fact that many initiatives take the form of a constitutional amendment. Several amendments involved the authorization of the creation of state government agencies, including the State Compensation Insurance Fund, the California Department of Alcoholic Beverage Control, and the State Bar of California; the purpose of such amendments was to insulate the agencies from being attacked as an unconstitutionally broad exercise of police power or inherent judicial power.

Unlike other state constitutions, the California Constitution strongly protects the corporate existence of cities and counties and grants them broad plenary home rule powers. The constitution gives charter cities, in particular, supreme authority over municipal affairs, even allowing such cities' local laws to trump state law. By specifically enabling cities to pay counties to perform governmental functions for them, Section 8 of Article XI resulted in the rise of the contract city.

Article 4, Section 8(d) defines an "urgency statute" as one "necessary for immediate preservation of the public peace, health, or safety"; any proposed bill including such a provision includes a "statement of facts constituting the necessity" and a two-thirds majority of each house is required to also separately pass the bill's urgency section.

Many of the individual rights clauses in the state constitution have been construed as protecting rights broader than the Bill of Rights in the federal constitution. Two examples include (1) the Pruneyard Shopping Center v. Robins case involving an implied right to free speech in private shopping centers, and (2) the first decision in America in 1972 found that the death penalty is unconstitutional. California v. Anderson, 6 Cal. 3d 628. This noted that under California's state constitution a stronger protection applies than under the U.S. Constitution's Eighth Amendment; the former prohibits punishments that are "cruel or unusual", while the latter only prohibits punishments that are "cruel and unusual". The constitution also confers upon women equality of rights in "entering or pursuing a business, profession, vocation, or employment." This is the earliest state constitutional equal rights provision on record.

Two universities are expressly mentioned in the constitution: the public state-run University of California and the private Stanford University. UC is one of only nine state-run public universities in the United States whose independence from political interference is expressly guaranteed by the state constitution. Since 1900, Stanford has enjoyed the benefit of a constitutional clause shielding Stanford-owned property from taxes as long as it is used for educational purposes.

== Amendments and revisions ==
The California Constitution distinguishes between constitutional amendments and constitutional revisions, the latter of which is considered to be a "substantial change to the entire constitution, rather than ... a less extensive change in one or more of its provisions". Both require passage of a California ballot proposition by the voters, but they differ in how they may be proposed. A constitutional amendment may be placed on the ballot by either a two-thirds vote in the California State Legislature or by signatures equal to 8% of the votes cast in the last gubernatorial election through the exercise of the initiative power by the voters. The signature requirement for constitutional amendments is among the lowest thresholds for similar measures of any U.S. state.

As of 2023, this was 874,641 signatures compared to a 2020 population of 39,538,223. A constitutional revision originally required a constitutional convention but today may be passed with the approval of both two-thirds of the Legislature and approval by a majority of voters; while simplified since its beginnings, the revision process is considered more politically charged and difficult to successfully pass than an amendment. Voters exercising the initiative power are not permitted to propose a constitutional revision.

== Signatories of the 1849 Constitution ==
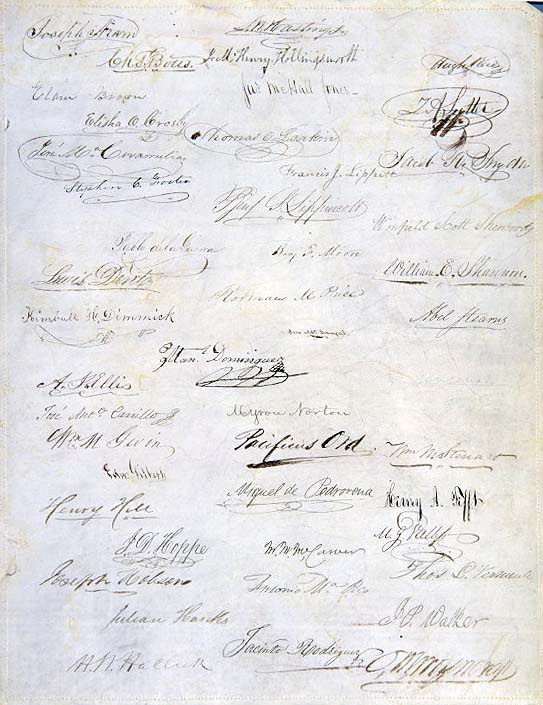
Signatures of the 1849 California Constitution

Many of the signatories to the state's original 1849 constitution were themselves prominent in their own right, and are listed below. The list notably includes several Californios (California-born, Spanish-speaking residents).

- Representing the District of Los Angeles

- José Antonio Carrillo
- Manuel Domínguez
- Stephen Clark Foster
- Hugo Reid
- Abel Stearns

- Representing the District of Monterey

- Charles T. Botts
- Lewis Dent
- Thomas O. Larkin
- Pacificus Ord
- Henry Wager Halleck

- Representing the District of Sacramento

- Elisha Oscar Crosby
- Lansford Hastings
- Morton Matthew McCarver
- John McDougall
- William E. Shannon
- Winfield S. Sherwood
- Jacob R. Snyder
- John Sutter

- Representing the District of San Diego

- Miguel de Pedrorena
- Henry Hill

- Representing the District of San Francisco

- Alfred James Ellis
- Edward Gilbert
- William M. Gwin
- Joseph Hobson
- Francis J. Lippitt
- Myron Norton
- William Morris Stewart
- Rodman M. Price

- Representing the District of San Joaquin

- John McHenry Hollingsworth
- James McHall Jones
- Benjamin S. Lippincott
- Benjamin F. Moore
- Thomas L. Vermeule
- Oliver Wozencraft

- Representing the District of San Luis Obispo

- José María Covarrubias
- Henry A. Tefft

- Representing the District of Santa Barbara

- Pablo de la Guerra
- Jacinto Rodríguez

- Representing the District of San José

- Joseph Aram
- Elam Brown
- Kimball Hale Dimmick
- Julian Hanks
- Jacob David Hoppe
- Antonio María Pico
- Pedro Sainsevain

- Representing the District of Sonoma

- Mariano Guadalupe Vallejo
- Robert B. Semple
- Joel P. Walker

== See also ==
- Government of California
- Politics of California
- Law of California
