= Philokalist =

Philokalist or Philocalist literally means "lover of beauty" (Greek roots phil- + kalos). The term may refer to:

- A pen name of Felix Wierzbicki
- An author or a follower of Philokalia, a guidance for Eastern Orthodox monks
- An author of any book titled Philocalia, e.g., Origen
