= William Shannon =

William Shannon may refer to:

- William V. Shannon (1927–1988), American journalist, author and ambassador
- William E. Shannon (1821/22–1850), American politician
