= Joseph Libbey Folsom =

American realtor

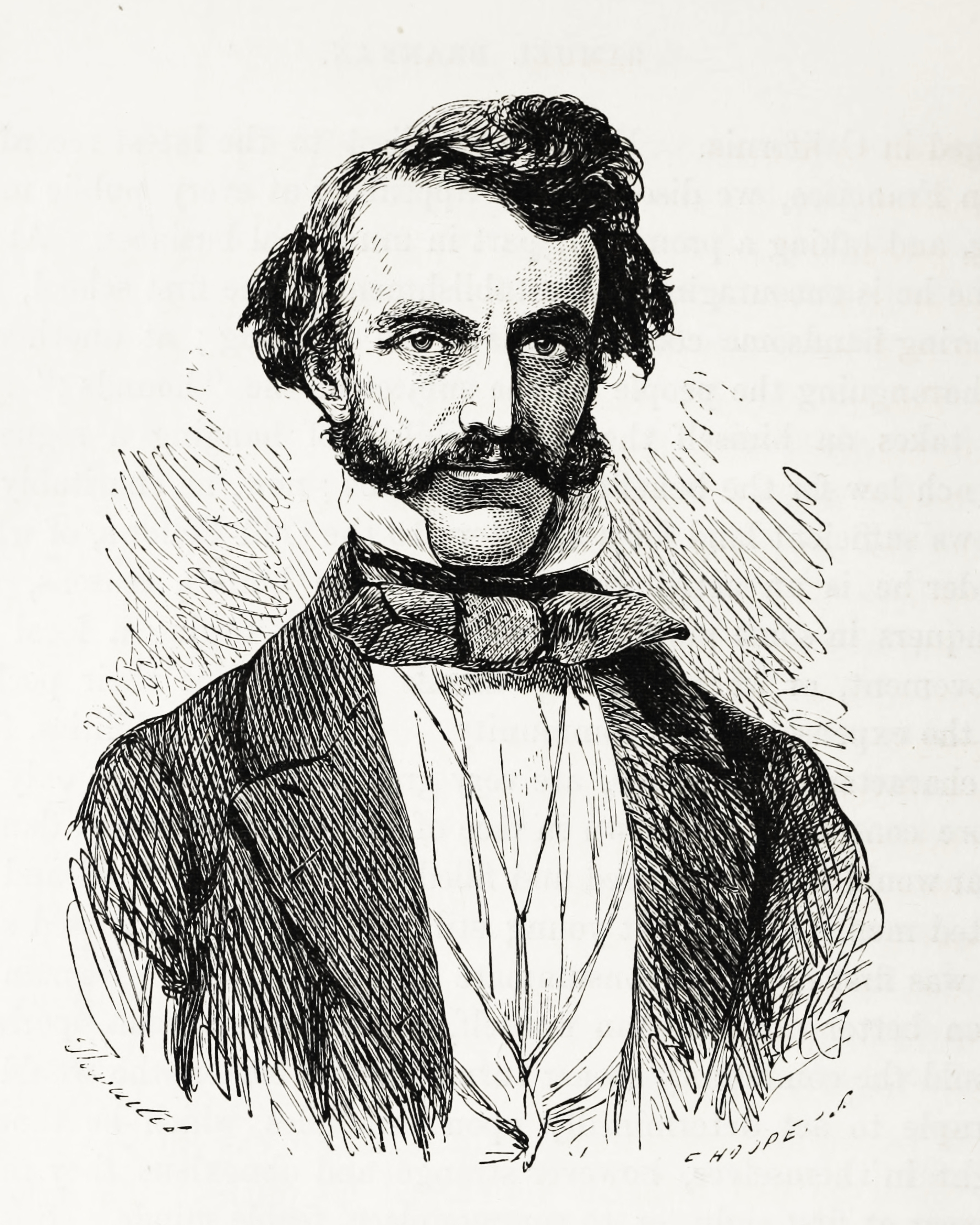
Joseph L. Folsom

Joseph Libbey Folsom (May 19, 1817 – July 19, 1855) was an American real estate investor, and military personnel in the early days of California's statehood. He was a United States Army officer. He is the founder of Folsom, California. Folsom's controversial purchase of Rancho Río de los Americanos land grant from the heirs of a San Francisco merchant William Alexander Leidesdorff remained tied up in litigation for many years, eventually reaching the Supreme Court of California after Folsom's death.

== Early life ==
Joseph Folsom was born on Monday, May 19, 1817, in Meredith, New Hampshire. He was the fourth child of Abraham Folsom and Mary Libbey. Descendants of a family that first arrived at Hingham, Massachusetts in the seventeenth century, and subsequently moved on to Exeter, New Hampshire, Abraham Folsom and his wife lived in a home near the northwest corner of Lake Winnipesaukee. Joseph had 5 siblings: Sally T. Folsom, George C. Folsom, Decatur A. Folsom, Charles P. Folsom, and Frank C. Folsom. Abraham Folsom died on Saturday, February 28, 1824, at the age of 46. Joseph was only 6 years old at the time of his father's death. Shortly after, the family moved 27 miles (43 km) southwest to Northfield, New Hampshire.

== Early military career ==
In June 1836, at the age of eighteen, Joseph became a cadet at the Military Academy at West Point. Four years later, in June 1840, he graduated with honors. On November 3, 1840, he held the rank of Second Lieutenant in the 5th infantry of the U.S. Army. He served under the command of General William J. Worth in Florida during the Second Seminole War. In 1844, he returned to the Academy at West Point where he served as an Instructor of infantry tactics for two years.

== California ==
In 1846, Folsom left the 5th U.S. Infantry to join the First Regiment of New York Volunteers under the command of Colonel Jonathan D. Stevenson. They sailed for six months before arriving at a port in Yerba Buena (early San Francisco) in March 1847. He was promoted to the rank of Captain and was made the regiment's quartermaster. Folsom received orders from General Stephen W. Kearny to inspect San Francisco Bay to select an area for the Army's Military Depot. He was also the first Collector of the Port of San Francisco under American rule from 1847 to 1849. After the Mexican War ended in 1848, he was mustered out of the volunteers and returned to the regular army and was stationed in San Francisco. In December 1851, he served as a judge on the courts martial of George H. Derby, the famous humorist, and Joseph Hooker, the assistant adjutant general of the Pacific Division in Sonoma, California.

Folsom invested in real estate by purchasing land owned by William Alexander Leidesdorff from Leidesdorff's mother Anna Maria Spark for $75,000 – a controversial purchase which was mired in litigation for years. Increasing land values in California made Captain Joseph Libbey Folsom a millionaire. In 1854, he chose an area of land near Sacramento, which he named "Granite City". In 1855, Joseph Folsom hired Theodore Dehone Judah, an engineer, to survey the area and map out the town. Folsom chose to name the streets of his town after the names of his friends, family, and other important people in California. He became the second president of the Sacramento Valley Railroad.

Joseph Folsom suffered from neuralgia, a painful nerve condition, and had symptoms of pneumonia. He died suddenly at the age of thirty-eight of renal failure while visiting friends at Mission San José (now Fremont, California) on Thursday, July 19, 1855.

In February 1856, the executors of Folsom's estate: Halleck, Peachy, and P. Warren Van Winkle changed the name of Granite City to Folsom, in his honor.
