= 1st Regiment of New York Volunteers =

1st Regiment of New York Volunteers, for service in California and during the war with Mexico, was raised in 1846 during the Mexican–American War by Jonathan D. Stevenson. Accepted by the United States Army in August 1846, the 1st Regiment of New York Volunteers was transported around Cape Horn to California, where it served as garrisons in Yerba Buena, Monterey, Santa Barbara, Los Angeles and San Diego. Elements of the Volunteers under Lieutenant Colonel Henry Stanton Burton were involved in operations of the Pacific Coast Campaign in Baja California, captured and garrisoned towns there, fighting in the Battle of La Paz, Siege of La Paz and defeated local forces at the Skirmish of Todos Santos after the peace was negotiated in 1848. The Regiment was then evacuated from Baja California and disbanded in California on August, September and October 1848.

== History ==
It was originally formed as the 7th Regiment of New York Volunteers upon the request of President James K. Polk by New York State Legislator Jonathan D. Stevenson. Secretary of War William L. Marcy directed Stevenson that the regiment should be composed of unmarried men, of good habits and varied pursuits, and such as would be likely to remain in California or adjoining territory at the close of the war.

The New York Legion departed New York 27 September 1846 aboard five ships, including the Susan Drew, LooChoo, and Thos H Perkins. Arriving in San Francisco 19 March 1847, companies D, E, G, and I were transported by store-ship to the California Capital Monterey. From this post, companies of the regiment were deployed by ship to lower California where they participated in the battles of La Paz, and the final Skirmish of Todos Santos. It is said of Co. D "This Company was without doubt the last command of American troops to leave the soil of Mexico after the close of the Mexican War." During the regiments tour of service in California portions of the regiment were dispatched throughout California in search of Indian horse-thieves. Much of the 1st New York was disbanded in early 1848.

== Many names ==
It was formed as the 7th Regiment New York Volunteers
and has been commonly referred to in New York as the California Guard or the California Regiment.
Since the 7th New York Volunteers was composed of infantry, cavalry, and artillery the regiment was also called the New York Legion.
Finally, it was re-designated in early 1848 by the War Department as the 1st Regiment New York Volunteers, for service in California and during the war with Mexico, and is now also called the 1st New York Legion.
However, this fact was not well known outside of California and thus another regiment formed in New York by Colonel Ward B. Burnett at which point it served in Mexico as the 1st Regiment New York Volunteers during the war but was re-designated by the War Department as the 2nd Regiment of New York Volunteers, during the war with Mexico.

== Flags ==
The regiment had 2 flags one was a Bear flag. It described by the Daily Alta California in 1886 as: "It is a yellow flag and has a brown grizzly in its center." It was not known when it was given to regiment, but it was first flown over the Presidio in San Francisco on the 8th of March, 1847.

The other flag was given to them in by General Winfield Scott in 1848, it was made after he captured of Mexico City. The flag was embroidered by a group of Mexican women and featured a blue silk field with a bald eagle in the center, above it was 2 haft rings of stars. In its claws was a scroll containing the inscription, "1st Regiment of New York Volunteers."

In 1850, The daily crescent describes that at least 2 flags belonging to the regiment were presented by Jonathan D. Stevenson to the State House in San Jose. During the American Civil War the Bear flag was given to the 7th California Infantry Regiment by Stevenson at the Presidio of San Francisco on March 8th, 1865.

== Field officers ==
- Colonel Jonathan D. Stevenson
- Lt. Colonel Henry S. Burton, (1st Lt. U.S. 3rd Artillery Regiment)
- Major James A. Hardie (2nd Lt., U.S. 3rd Artillery Regiment

== Staff officers ==
- Surgeon, Alexander Perry.
- Asst. Surgeon, Robert Murray.
- Asst. Surgeon, William C. Parker.
- Captain William G. Marcy, Commissary.
- Adjutants
  - First Lieutenant Henry C. Matsell. (Relinquished staff position to command his Company B, March 1847.)
  - First Lieutenant John C. Bonnycastle, (From March 22, 1847; appointed to U.S. 4th Infantry Regiment June 1848.)
  - Captain Joseph L. Folsom, Asst. Quartermaster.

== Non-commissioned staff ==
- Sergeant-Major, Alexander C. McDonald.
- Quarter-master Sergeant, Stephen Harris.
- Quarter-master Sergeant, George G. Belt.
- Quarter-master Sergeant, James C. Low.

== Sutler's Department ==
- Sutler, Samuel W. Haight.
- Clerk, James C. L. Wadsworth.

== Company A ==
- Captain, Seymour G. Steele.
- First Lieutenant, George S. Penrose. Acting commissary and quartermaster.
- Second Lieutenant, Charles Benjamin Young
- Second Lieutenant, George Francis Lemon, (Post Adjutant)
- Sergeant, Sherman O. Houghton.
- Sergeant, Walter Chipman.
- Sergeant, Edward Irwin.

== Company B ==
- Captain, James M. Turner (did not go to California)
- First Lieutenant, Henry C. Matsell, (Former Adjutant, commanded Company B from March 1847.)
- Second Lieutenant, Thomas E. Ketchum
- Second Lieutenant, E. Gould Buffum
- Sergeant, James Stayton
- Sergeant, Charles C. Scott.
- Sergeant, John Wilt.
- Sergeant, Charles Richardson.
- Sergeant, James D. Denniston.

== Company C ==
- Captain, John E. Brackett (former 2nd Lt. U.S. 2nd Artillery Regiment)
- First Lieutenant, William R. Tremells, (Acting adjutant—died at sea off Cape Horn.)
- First Lieutenant, Thomas J. Roach.
- Second Lieutenant, Theron R. Perlee.
- Second Lieutenant, Charles C. Anderson, (died at San Francisco September 13, 1847).
- Second Lieutenant, George D. Brewerton, (Appointed to U.S. 1st Infantry Regiment.
- Sergeant, Edmund P. Crosby.
- Sergeant, William Johnson.
- Sergeant, George Robinson.
- Corp, Cushing, ( d. 11 January 1848 Sonoma, CA, born Boston, MA)

== Company D ==
- Captain, Henry M. Naglee (former 2nd Lt. U.S. 5th Infantry Regiment)
- First Lieutenant, George A. Pendleton.
- Second Lieutenant, Hiram W. Theall.
- Second Lieutenant, Joseph C. Morehead.
- Sergeant, Aaron Lyons.
- Sergeant, William Roach.
- Sergeant, Henry J. Wilson.

== Company E ==
- Captain, Nelson Taylor.
- First Lieutenant, Edwards Williams.
- Second Lieutenant, William E. Cuttrell.
- Second Lieutenant, Thomas L. Vermeule.
- Sergeant, John M. O'Neil.
- Sergeant, Henry S. Morton.
- Sergeant, James Maneis.
- Sergeant, Abraham Van Riper.
- Walgamuth Henry J. (Alt Spelling) Wohlgemouth Henry J.

== Company F ==
- Captain, Francis J. Lippitt.
- First Lieutenant, Henry Storrow Carnes.
- Second Lieutenant, William H. Weirick.
- Second Lieutenant, John M. Huddart.
- Sergeant, James Queen.
- Sergeant, Thomas Hipwood.
- Sergeant, James Mulvey.
- Sergeant, John C. Pulis.

== Company G ==
- Captain, Matthew R. Stevenson (2nd Lt. U.S. 7th Infantry Regiment)
- Second Lieutenant, John McHenry Hollingsworth. (May 1847)
- Second Lieutenant, Jeremiah Sherwood.
- Second Lieutenant, William H. Smith.
- Sergeant, Walter Taylor.
- Sergeant, William B. Travers.
- Sergeant, James Mehan.
- Sergeant, John Connell.
- Sergeant, George Jackson.

== Company H ==
- Captain, John B. Frisbie.
- First Lieutenant, Edward Gilbert, (Acting adjutant)
- Second Lieutenant, John S. Day.
- Sergeant, Eleazer Frisbie.
- Sergeant, William Grow.
- Sergeant, Henry A. Schoolcraft.
- Sergeant, James Winne.
- Private, George N. Cornwell
- Felix Wierzbicki

== Company I ==
- Captain, William E. Shannon.
- First Lieutenant, Henry Magee.
- Second Lieutenant, Palmer B. Hewlett.
- Sergeant, Joseph Evans.
- Sergeant, Joshua S. Vincent.
- Sergeant, B. Logan.

== Company K ==
- Captain, Kimball H. Dimmick.
- First Lieutenant, George C. Hubbard.
- Second Lieutenant, John S. Norris.
- Second Lieutenant, Roderick M. Morrison.
- Sergeant, Jackson Sellers.

== See also ==
- List of U. S. Army, Navy and Volunteer units in the Mexican American War
- Jack Powers
