= William Leidesdorff =

American politician

William Alexander Leidesdorff
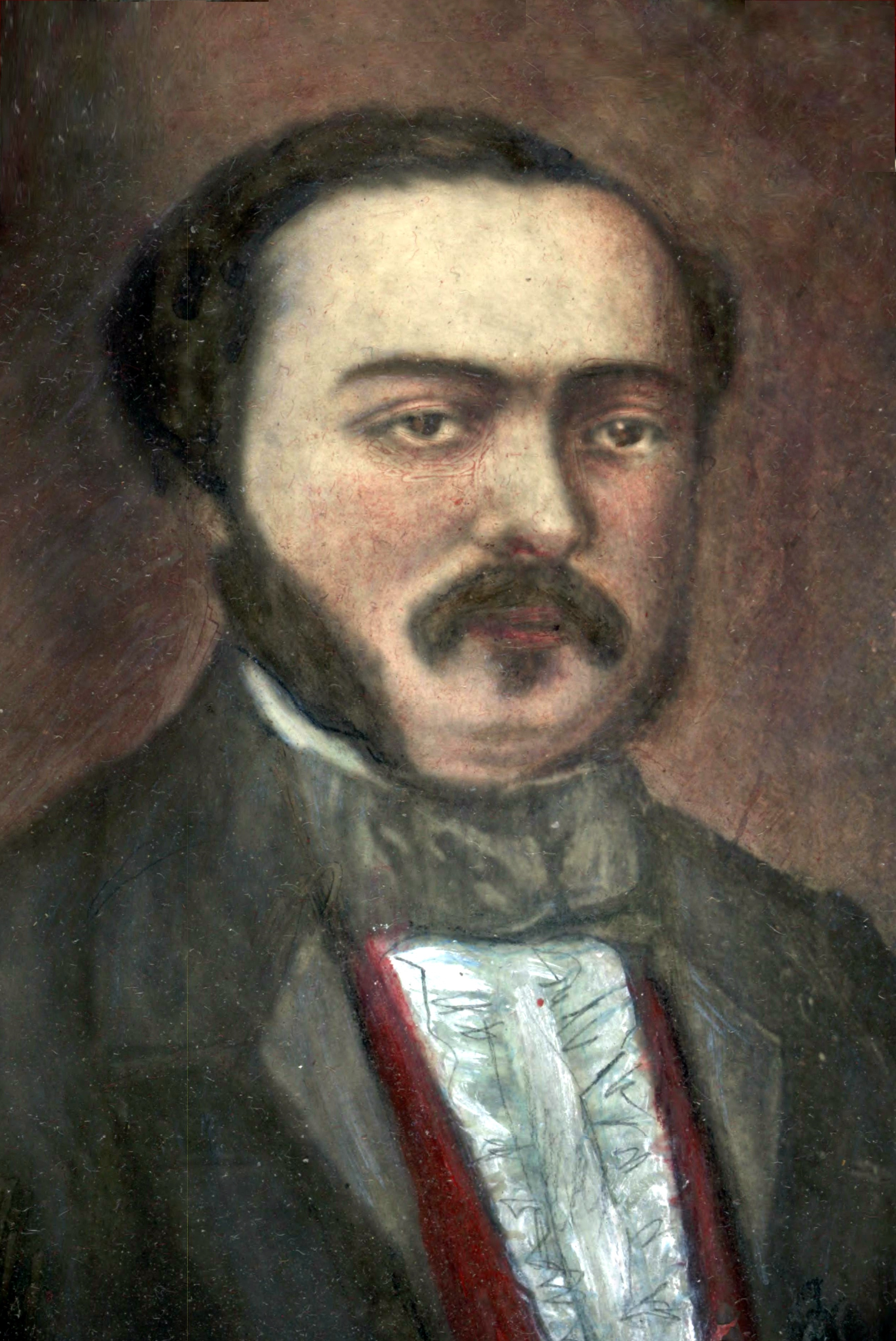
- Anonymous portrait of Leidesdorff (c. 1845)
- Born: 1810; St. Croix, Danish West Indies
- Died: May 18, 1848 (aged 38); California
- Burial place: Mission San Francisco de Asís
- Title: American vice-consul for the Port of San Francisco
- Term: October 1845 - July 1846
- Successor: Office abolished
- Parents: Wilhelm Alexander Leidesdorff (father); Anna Marie Sparks (mother)

William Alexander Leidesdorff Jr. (1810 – May 18, 1848) was an Afro-Caribbean settler in California and one of the founders of the city that became San Francisco. A highly successful, enterprising businessman, he is thought to have been the first black millionaire in the United States.

Leidesdorff was a West Indian immigrant of Afro-Cuban, possibly Carib, Danish/Swedish and Jewish ancestry. Leidesdorff became a United States citizen in New Orleans in 1834. He migrated to Alta California in 1841, then under Mexican rule, settling in Yerba Buena (now San Francisco), a village of about 30 Mexican and European families.

He became a Mexican citizen in 1844 and received a land grant from the Mexican government, 8 Spanish leagues, or 35,500 acres (144 km^{2}) south of the American River, known as Rancho Rio de los Americanos. He served as US Vice Consul to Mexico at the Port of San Francisco beginning in 1845. Leidesdorff was President of the San Francisco school board and also elected as City Treasurer. At the time of his death, his Rio de los Americanos land grant was being developed to produce wheat and cattle. By the time his estate was auctioned off in1856, eight years after his death, it was worth more than $1,445,000, not including vast quantities of gold mined upon his land.

International Leidesdorff bicentennial celebrations began on October 22, 2011, on his native isle of Saint Croix, U.S. Virgin Islands.

== Early life ==
Leidesdorff was born in 1810 on the island of Saint Croix in the Danish West Indies, to William Leidesdorff Sr., a white Danish plantation manager, and Anna Maria Spark, a free woman of color who became a merchant in Christiansted, Saint Croix. At the time of his birth, Saint Croix was occupied and governed by the British. As his parents were not legally married, Leidesdorff was considered illegitimate until July 18th, 1837, when a Crucian court formally recognized his birth, allowing him to inherit his father's property.

Wilhelm Leidesdorff Sr. was reportedly of Jewish descent from the community of Altona, Hamburg. It was part of the Danish Schleswig-Holstein, then across the river from but now part of today's port of Hamburg, Germany. He migrated to North America and later the Caribbean to further his career as a merchant. At the time Leidesdorff Jr.'s birth he was manager of Morning Star Plantation on Saint Croix which was owned by William MacDougall. Leidesdorff Sr. died on Saint Croix on January 3, 1840.

Leidesdorff, Jr.'s mother Anna Maria Spark, was described in one account as a Carib Indian woman; she was believed also to have had African and European ancestry. Her race was noted in a census report. Many people observed that what were called "Carib" people had skin of various hues that likely reflected mixed ancestry, ranging from dark brown to lighter shades of brown, resulting in a Virgin Islands Creole, to which she may have belonged. Other sources said the mother Marie Anne Spark (as she was also known) was a mixed-race woman of African and Spanish heritage, thought to have been born in Cuba. In census records, Marie Anne Spark was classified as a free Carib Indian, but few Carib survived into the late 18th century, according to Gary Palgon's biography of Leidesdorff. Other sources document tens of thousands of Caribs, most of mixed heritage, living in the Windwards and Trinidad at the time of Leidesdorff's birth. Together the accounts describe Spark as a light-skinned woman of mixed-race ancestry, yet classified as black by the 1850s California Court System, where blacks were restricted from testifying in court.

According to Sue Bailey Thurman, "With the name of William Alexander Leidesdorff, we begin the documentary history of pioneers of Negro origin in California."

As an infant, Leidesdorff was baptized as a Lutheran, as were all the Leidesdorff children, since it was the adopted faith his father and many other people of Jewish ancestry in Europe assumed to avoid conflict. In 1837 Leidesdorff Sr. officially "adopted" all four of his own children from Anna Maria Spark to give them legal standing by Danish Law.

== Career ==
In 1834, Leidesdorff immigrated to New Orleans where he became a naturalized American citizen and a ship captain. He held posts with firms associated with his father or perhaps his mentors. Ship manifest documents show Leidesdorff's working as Ship Captain and/or Master, 1834–1840, out of the Port of New Orleans. William Alexander Leidesdorff, Jr. was able to pursue a career as a ship captain in Louisiana despite enforcement of the Negro Seamen Acts because he did not acknowledge his African heritage and visibly passed as someone of white European decent.

Leidesdorff traveled to New York to become the Master of the schooner Julia Ann that sailed from New York to Yerba Buena (later San Francisco) in Alta California, then part of Mexico, in 1841. His route was via Panama, St. Croix, Brazil, Chile, the Sandwich Islands (Hawaii), Sitka (Alaska), and on to California following the Pacific Ocean currents.

== In San Francisco ==
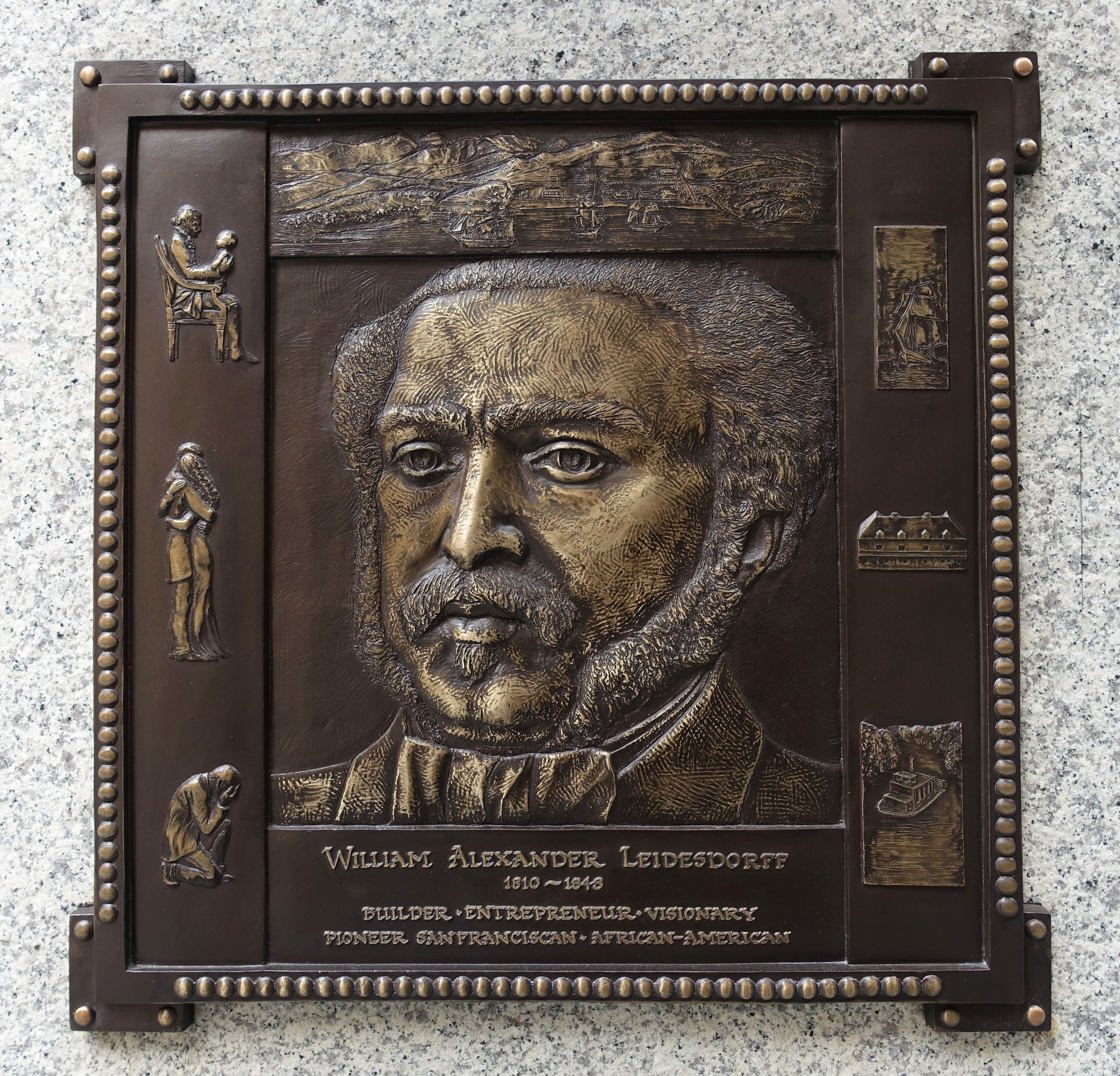
William Alexander Leidesdorff memorial in San Francisco, CA

On arriving at Yerba Buena, Leidesdorff, Jr. began to re-build his businesses. The village cove then only had thirty European-Mexican families, so it did not take long for the ambitious man to make an impact. He launched the first steamboat to operate on San Francisco Bay and the Sacramento River; it was small at 37 feet (11 m) long, purchased in Alaska but delivered to Yerba Buena Cove on aboard the Russian bark 'Naslednich' in October, 1847. He built the City Hotel, the first hotel in San Francisco, and the first commercial shipping warehouse, the latter on what became Leidesdorff Street off the Embarcadero.

In 1844 Leidesdorff obtained a vast land grant through favor from the Mexican government for 35,521 acres (143.75 km^{2}) on the south bank of the American River, near today's Californian City of Sacramento.He named the property Rancho Rio de los Americanos. During this period, Mexico encouraged leading Americans to settle in its territory by granting large land grants; in exchange the government required Americans to convert to Catholicism, the state religion; learn to speak Spanish; and accept Mexican citizenship. He went on to establish extensive commercial relations throughout Hawaii, Alaska and Mexican California.

During the eight years of his residence, Leidesdorff served as one of six aldermen or town councilors of the Ayuntamiento. After the United States took over California following the Mexican–American War, he was one of three members on the first San Francisco school board, which organized the first public school in the city; later he was elected City Treasurer. His house was one of the largest, and he donated land for the first public school.

In 1845, during the President James Polk administration, Leidesdorff accepted the request from United States Consul Thomas O. Larkin to serve as the US Vice Consul to Mexico at the Port of San Francisco, a measure of his political standing in region. Larkin was the first and last U.S. consul appointed to serve in California. Before the American flag was raised over San Francisco (July 1846), Leidesdorff had the U.S. Declaration of Independence read for the first time in California on the veranda at his home in celebration of Independence Day.

Leidesdorff, Jr. achieved a high reputation for integrity and enterprise; he is said to have been "liberal, hospitable, cordial, confiding even to a fault." Leidesdorff became one of the wealthiest men in California. However, at the time of his death, he was $50,000 in debt and the whole of his assets, including the Rio de los Americanos land grant, wer not considered of sufficient value to cover the debts. The gold rush had not yet started and he died before his land was to increase greatly in value over the following few years.

In March 1848, the California Star reported the total non-Native population of San Francisco as only 812: 575 males, 177 females and 60 children. In May 1848, the vast majority of men departed for the American River gold fields in hopes of striking it rich. Other towns were nearly emptied in the frenzy of the Gold Rush.

== Personal life ==
Leidesdorff never married. According to the explorer John C. Fremont, he lived with a Russian woman while maintaining diplomatic relationships with the Russian community in Sitka, Alaska.

== Death ==
Leidesdorff died of brain fever on May 18, 1848 after receiving last rites from a Catholic priest. On the day of his burial, the town was in mourning, flags were at half-mast, business was suspended, and the schools were closed. His remains were interred near the front entrance of Mission Dolores the next day on May 19th.

== Leidesdorff estate and controversy ==
The California pioneer died intestate, with no living relatives in California or the United States. In 1848 his estate was assumed devalued and in debt. The public discovery of gold in the American River valley and upon his extensive land holdings increased the actual value of his estate dramatically but posthumously. His waterfront property in today's financial district of San Francisco would be valuable today. A complete inventory of his estate has yet to be quantified. The court appointed temporary administrators of his estate because there were no probate laws in California at that time. By 1854, when the California State Legislature considered escheat to take control of the property, Leidesdorff's estate was worth well over one million dollars and multiple of millions of dollars in gold was mined off his land. When the Leidesdorff-Folsom partitioned estate was auctioned off in 1856, the property brought more than $1,445,000.

Settlement of the estate was complicated by the actions of Joseph Folsom. As Customs Collector and Harbor Master for San Francisco in 1848, he had become familiar with Leidesdorff's business dealings with the U.S. Army.

In 1849, Folsom took leave from the U.S. Army and located Leidesdorff's mother and some of his siblings in the West Indies. Folsom signed a note to purchase from Anna Maria Spark title to her son's estate for $75,000, title which included all of Leidesdorff's real estate holdings in San Francisco as well as the 35,000-acre (140 km^{2}) Rancho Rio de los Americanos near Sacramento. He paid her a deposit, with the promise of two more installment payments.

By the time Folsom returned to San Francisco, land prices were rising. The government challenged his purchase of Leidesdorff's title, as Anna Maria Spark legally had no claim to it. A California State government "claim was brought because under old Mexican law that foreigners could not inherit property. The dispute was brought to the courts, where legal entanglements over the conflicts of Mexican, American and Danish laws kept it for over ten years." The uncertainty of new probate laws, combined with the fact that William Leidesdorff, though he had held federal offices, held dual Mexican and U.S. citizenship, further complicated the property issues.

Leidesdorff's St. Croix relatives, mother and siblings, challenged title through Danish officials because of Folsom's false evaluation of the estate. Both the US and Mexican national governments had interest in the large estate. The high value and reach of the Leidesdorff estate made Folsom's "purchase" extremely controversial. In 1854, Governor Bigler, recommended the escheat of the estate, then worth a million and a half, to the state legislature, and suggested that proceedings be commenced for its recovery from Folsom. The courts refused to admit the title of the West Indian mixed-race relatives because there may have been "other heirs, who had never conveyed away their rights in the estate", from Europe. These "other heirs" from Leidesdorff's father's family lived in Europe at Altona and Copenhagen, and in the Caribbean Islands.

Ultimately the following happened: (1) The claims of Leidesdorff's West Indian relatives were thrown out of court; their evidence of relationship was rejected. As they were not American citizens, they were not considered to have standing. (2) No recognized Danish family or individual of the name of Leidesdorff appeared to claim the estate of William Leidesdorff of San Francisco. Other Danish members of the family lived on St. Croix for some time after the American's death. (3) The statute of limitations covered and protected every title obtained from Joseph L. Folsom and others who later acquired possession.

== Legacy and honors ==
Today, William Alexander Leidesdorff, Jr. is recognized as the "African Founding Father of California", as noted by the California State Legislature.

- Leidesdorff Street in San Francisco, California and Leidesdorff Street in Folsom, California are named for him.
- 15 miles (24 km) of U.S. Route 50 was dedicated the William Alexander Leidesdorff, Jr. Memorial Highway along the boundary of "Historic Leidesdorff Ranch", his 35,000-acre (140 km^{2}) cattle and wheat ranch along the southern banks of the American River Parkway, Sacramento County.
- 25th Anniversary of the Federal Holiday for Dr. Martin Luther King Jr. at the CORE New York City, New York Gala honoring the Leidesdorff Legacy.
- Leidesdorff Exhibit, Mission Delores Basilica, San Francisco, California, May 1–31, 2010
- Leidesdorff Bicentennial Celebration – "Golden Legacy of William Alexander Leidesdorff, Jr.," October 23, 2010, St. Croix, U.S. Virgin Islands.

== Sources ==
- California Reports, 1854
- "William Leidesdorf", Jewish Encyclopedia, 1906
- Journal of the Senate of California, 1854: Soule, Annals of San Francisco
- Hittell, History of California, vols. ii and iv
- California State Legislature, ACR 131 (Cox), 2004
- A. J. V. Sweasy, Early Days and Men of California
