= Felix Wierzbicki =

Polish-American physician; author of 1849 book about California

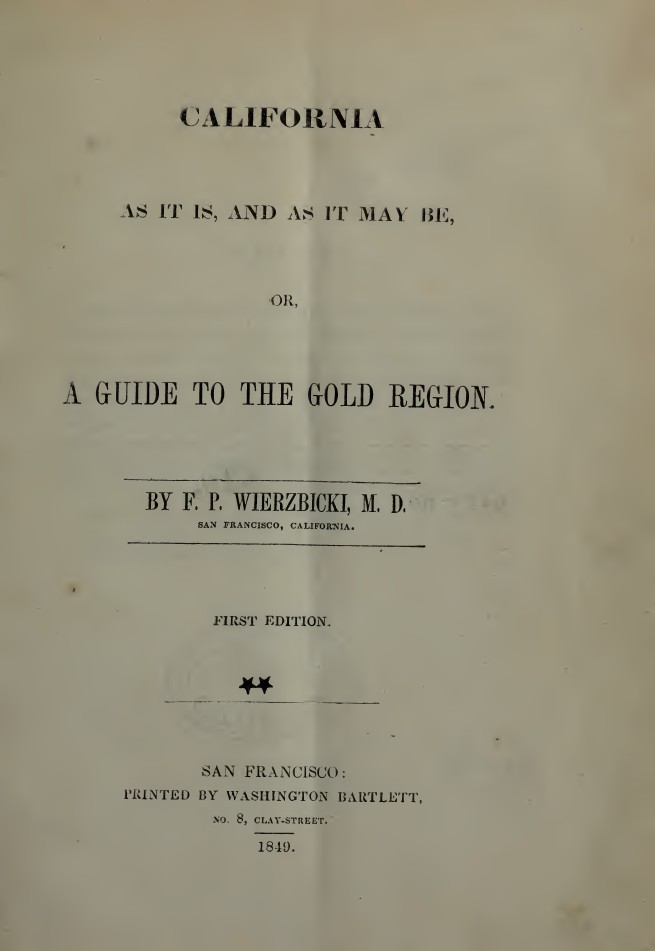
California as It Is and as It May Be, or a Guide to the Gold Region, 1849

Felix Wierzbicki (Polish: Feliks Paweł Wierzbicki [Felix Paul Wierzbicki]; 1 January 1815, in Czerniawka, Volhynia, Poland, now Chernyavka, Zhytomyr Oblast, Ukraine – 26 December 1860, in San Francisco) was a Polish-American veteran of the November 1830 Uprising, medical doctor, soldier, traveler, and writer.

== Early life ==
Felix Pawel Wierzbicki was born January 1, 1815 in Czerniawka, Volhynia, Poland, which is now known as Chernyavka, in the Zhytomyr Oblast of Ukraine. In his mid-teens, Wierzbicki participated in the Polish revolutionary movement of the November 1830 Uprising. He fought against the Russian Empire at the battles of Grochów and Ostrołęka, as well as in the defense of Warsaw.

At the end of the insurrection, Felix and his regiment retreated into then Austrian-held Galicia, and were disbanded and interned by Austrian forces. The Austrian Empire maintained custody of Poles who fled into Austria until 1833, in agreement with the Russian Empire and the Kingdom of Prussia. The Austrian government granted Polish refugees and prisoners a choice between a government-facilitated repatriation to occupied Poland or resettlement into the United States. Wierzbicki was among those who opted for the latter, and on November 21st, 1833, the Poles boarded two ships docked at Trieste. These ships arrived in New York on March 28th, 1834.

Having expressed interest in medicine in his youth prior to his service in the uprising, Wierzbicki enrolled in Yale from 1835-36 for his medical education. Additionally, he taught French at Amherst College in Massachusetts. After receiving his medical degree, he moved to Providence, Rhode Island and worked as a physician.

== Life in the United States ==
In 1842 while living in Providence, Wierzbicki published his first book The Ideal Man: A Conversation between Two Friends, upon the Beautiful, the Good, and the True, as Manifested in Actual Life. He signed it under the pen name Philokalist (meaning “lover of beauty"). On July 22nd, 1845 he was naturalized and became a legal immigrant in America. During this time he also patented improved designs for stoves and fireplaces with Henry Kalusowski.

In 1846, he began a two year service in the United States military during the Mexican-American War. Having enlisted with the 7th New York Volunteer Regiment, he served as a steward on a hospital ship before he was honorably discharged in 1848. The New York Volunteers was a unit organized by Colonel Jonathan D. Stevenson to occupy and settle California. Wierzbicki then participated in the California Gold Rush.

Wierzbicki moved to California and in 1849 he published his most famous work, and the first English-language book printed in California, California as it is and as it may be; or, A guide to the gold region. This book detailed the expectations and the reality of the Gold Rush, practical advice for mining gold, and in it he urged that the future of California would be found in other minerals and agriculture.

== Death ==
Felix Wierzbicki died in his home on December 26, 1860, from lung congestion at age 45. He was originally buried in San Francisco's former Laurel Hill Cemetery, now known by the name of Lone Mountain. Wierzbicki's remains were later reinterred at the San Francisco National Cemetery.

== Books ==
- The Ideal Man: A Conversation between Two Friends, upon the Beautiful, the Good, and the True, as Manifested in Actual Life, Boston, E.P. Peabody, 1842. Signed A Philokalist ("Lover of Beauty"), credited to Wierzbicki.
- California as It Is and as It May Be, or A Guide to the Gold Region, 1849.
