= James Allen Hardie =

American Civil War officer (1823–1876)

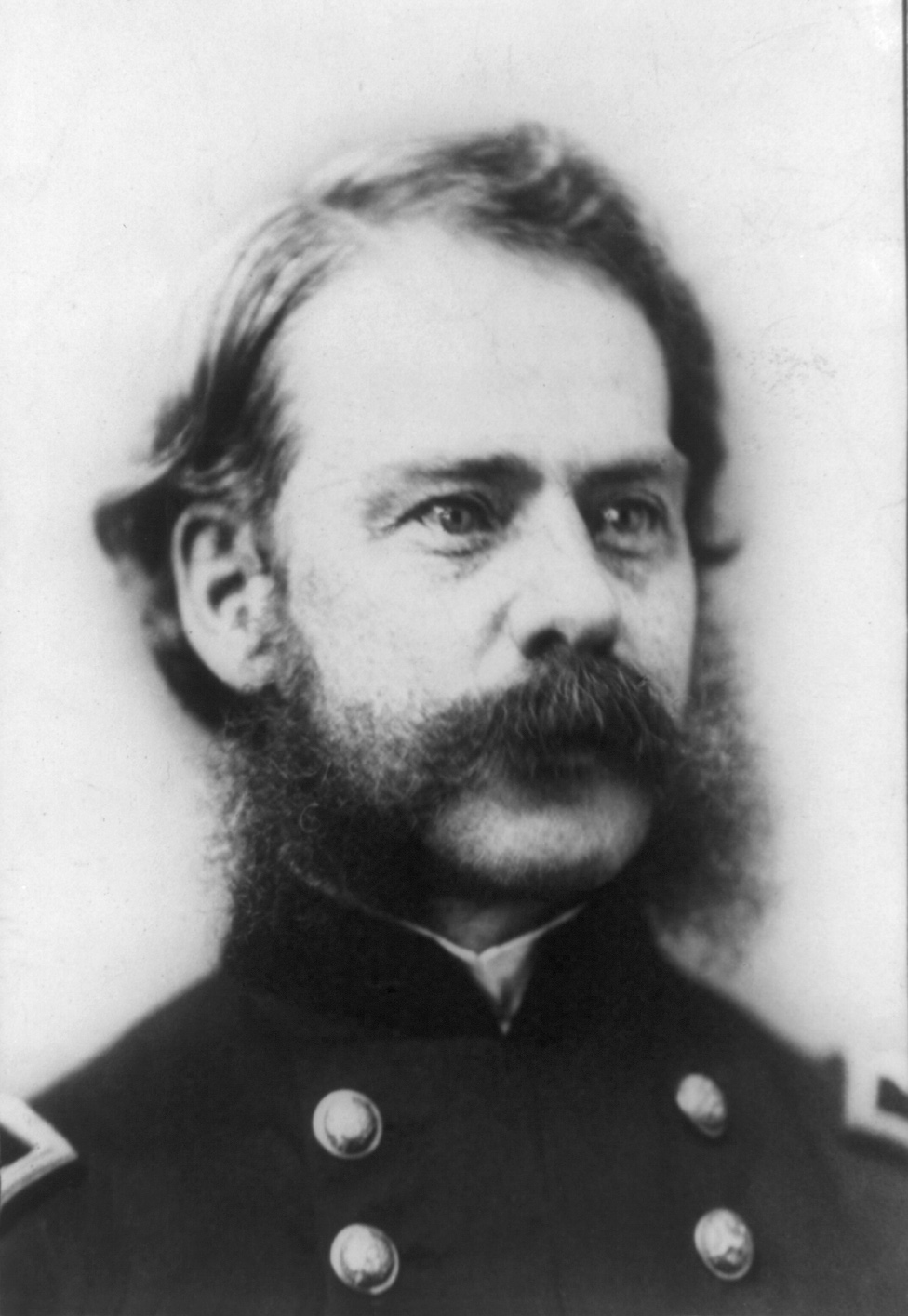
- James A. Hardie
- Born: May 5, 1823; New York City, New York, U.S.
- Died: December 14, 1876 (aged 53); Washington, D.C.
- Burial place: Green-Wood Cemetery; Brooklyn, New York, U.S.
- Military career
- Allegiance: United States of America; Union
- Branch: United States Army; Union Army
- Service years: 1843–1876
- Rank: Colonel; Brevet Major General
- Conflicts: Mexican-American War; American Civil War

James Allen Hardie (May 5, 1823 – December 14, 1876) was an American soldier, serving in a number of important administrative positions in the Union Army during the American Civil War.

== Early life ==
Hardie was born in New York City. He graduated from the United States Military Academy in 1843, 11th in a class of 39 cadets, and began serving with the 3rd U.S. Artillery Regiment. During the Mexican–American War, as a second lieutenant, he was detached from his regiment to serve with the 1st Regiment of New York Volunteers, for service in California and during the war with Mexico as a major. As such he became the military commandant of San Francisco. Returning to his regiment he participated in the campaigns against the Indians in Oregon and Washington Territory, and was an aide to Brig. Gen. John E. Wool. Hardie was in camp with General George Wright on Latah (Hangman's) Creek, near present-day Spokane, in 1858 when they lured Qualchan to camp and summarily hung him. Qualchan's father, Chief Owhi, who was in their custody, was later shot while trying to escape. Promoted to captain, he was serving as Adjutant General of the Department of Oregon when the American Civil War began.

== Civil War ==
Promoted to lieutenant colonel on September 28, 1861, Hardie joined the staff of Maj. Gen. George B. McClellan. During the Peninsula, Maryland, and Fredericksburg campaigns of the Civil War he was acting adjutant general of the Army of the Potomac, and on November 29, 1862, was appointed brigadier general of volunteers, but it was not confirmed by the United States Senate and the promotion was revoked on January 22, 1863. In 1863 he was appointed assistant adjutant general with the rank of major on the staff of the regular army, and on May 24, 1864, was made inspector general with the rank of colonel. On March 3, 1865, President Abraham Lincoln nominated Hardie for appointment to the grade of brevet brigadier general in the regular army to rank from March 3, 1865 and the United States Senate confirmed the appointment on March 9, 1865.

Hardie played an important administrative role in two key incidents during the war. During the Battle of Fredericksburg, he delivered the attack orders to Maj. Gen. William B. Franklin on December 13, 1862. Franklin did not conduct his attack to Maj. Gen. Ambrose E. Burnside's expectations, and Hardie has been criticized for not ensuring that the two generals understood each other correctly. On June 28, 1863, Hardie was the officer who delivered the surprise order to Maj. Gen. George G. Meade at Frederick, Maryland, appointing him commander of the Army of the Potomac, three days prior to the Battle of Gettysburg.

On March 8, 1866, President Andrew Johnson nominated Hardie to the grade of brevet major general in the regular army, to rank from March 13, 1865. The United States Senate confirmed the nomination on May 4, 1866 and reconfirmed it on July 14, 1866.

== Postbellum life ==
After the Civil War, Hardie served as one of the inspector generals of the Army. His military career lasted for 37 years until his death on active duty. In 1876 he was elected as a Companion of the Pennsylvania Commandery of the Military Order of the Loyal Legion of the United States.

He died in Washington, D.C., and is buried in Green-Wood Cemetery, Brooklyn, New York.
