= Jacob R. Snyder =

American politician

Personal details
- Born: c. 1812 Philadelphia, Pennsylvania
- Died: April 29, 1878 Sonoma, California
- Spouse(s): Susan H. Brayton (m. 1850, d. 1871), Rachel J. Sears (m. 1874)
- Profession: Army, politician

Military service
- Allegiance: California
- Rank: General

Jacob R. Snyder (c. 1812 - 1878) served in the California legislature and during the Mexican–American War he served in the US Army.

== Biography ==
Snyder was born in about 1812 in Philadelphia, Pennsylvania. His father, John Snyder was a flour merchant. His life was influenced by his father's business. In 1834, he started to settle himself on the bank of the Ohio River (the present town of Albany, Indiana) which was almost unbroken forest. He removed to California in 1846. Sometimes he was with military affairs.

Governor Mason appointed him Surveyor-General of the Middle Department of California. He was Quartermaster of Fremont's California Battalion and held an office until last moment of the Mexican war. From San Francisco, Snyder received the Senatorial nomination in 1851 and was elected by a large majority. He became a member of the banking firm of James King & Company the previous year. He was appointed a responsible position, United States Assistant Treasurer at San Francisco by President Franklin Pierce in 1853.

Snyder retired from the cares of office in 1862. He spent his last days in his residence in Sonoma Valley and died on 29 April 1878.
