= Thomas L. Vermeule =

American politician

Thomas Lloyd Vermeule (11 June 1814, New Jersey – 1856, Stockton, California) served in the California senate and signed the Constitution of California. During the Mexican–American War, he served in the United States Army.
