= Kimball H. Dimmick =

American politician (1815–1861)

Kimball Hale "K. H." Dimmick
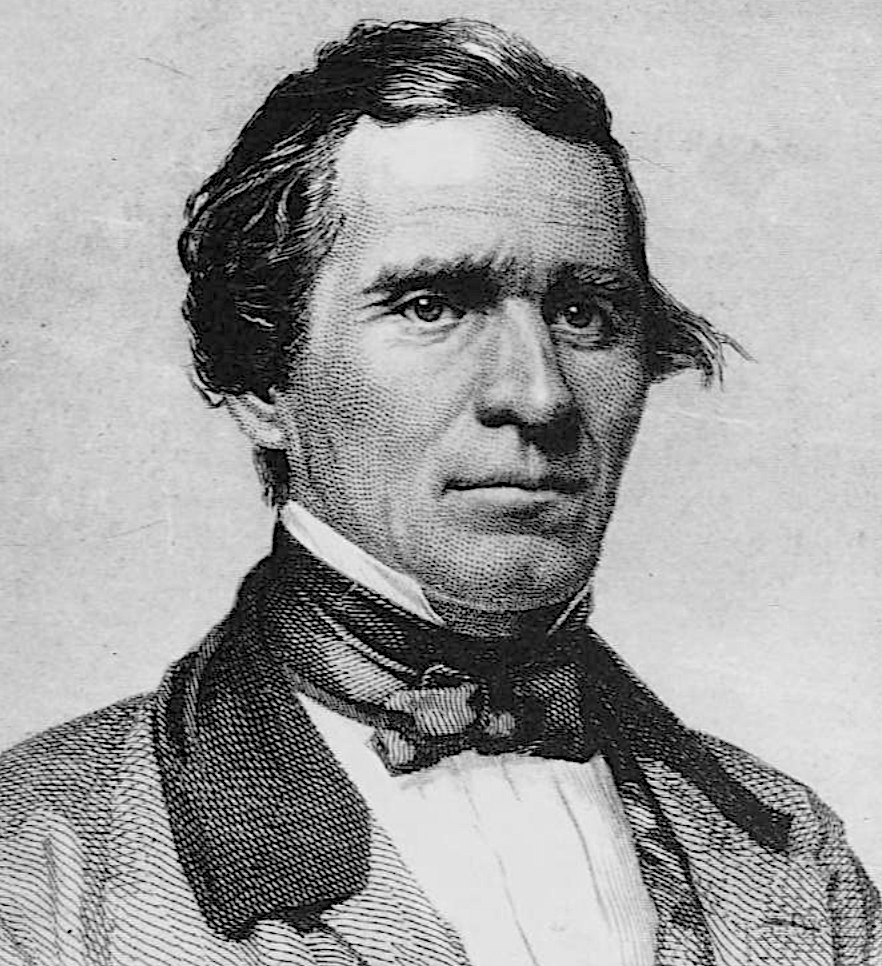
- Kimball H. Dimmick in 1861

District Attorney of Los Angeles

Member of the California State Legislature

Alcalde and Judge of the First Instance of San Jose, California

Personal details
- Born: 1815 Chenango County, New York
- Died: September 11, 1861 (aged 45–46) Los Angeles

Kimball Hale "K. H." Dimmick (1815 in Chenango County, New York – September 11, 1861 in Los Angeles) was an American politician, alcalde, judge, and lawyer. He served in the California legislature, and during the Mexican–American War he served in the United States Army. Dimmick signed the Constitution of California in 1849, as well as serving as the District Attorney for Los Angeles. He was an alcalde (mayor) and judge of the first instance in San Jose, California under the military transition to California statehood in 1849.
