= William E. Shannon =

American politician

William E. Shannon (1821/1822 – November 3, 1850) was an American politician.

Born in Ballina, County Mayo, Ireland, he passed the New York State Bar, was commissioned as a Captain in the United States Army, and given command of "Company J" of the 1st Regiment of New York Volunteers, which arrived in San Francisco on the Susan Drew on March 20, 1847 to take part in the so-called California Conquest campaign of the Mexican–American War.

After his military service, he served as mayor of Coloma, California, then was elected to the State Senate, where he stood out as a staunch abolitionist, reportedly having "secured the declaration in California's Bill of Rights that neither slavery or involuntary servitude, unless for the punishment of crimes, shall ever be tolerated in this state."

== Death ==
Shannon died in Sacramento during the 1829–51 cholera pandemic, aged 28.
