= Jonathan D. Stevenson =

American politician (1800–1894)

Jonathan Drake Stevenson
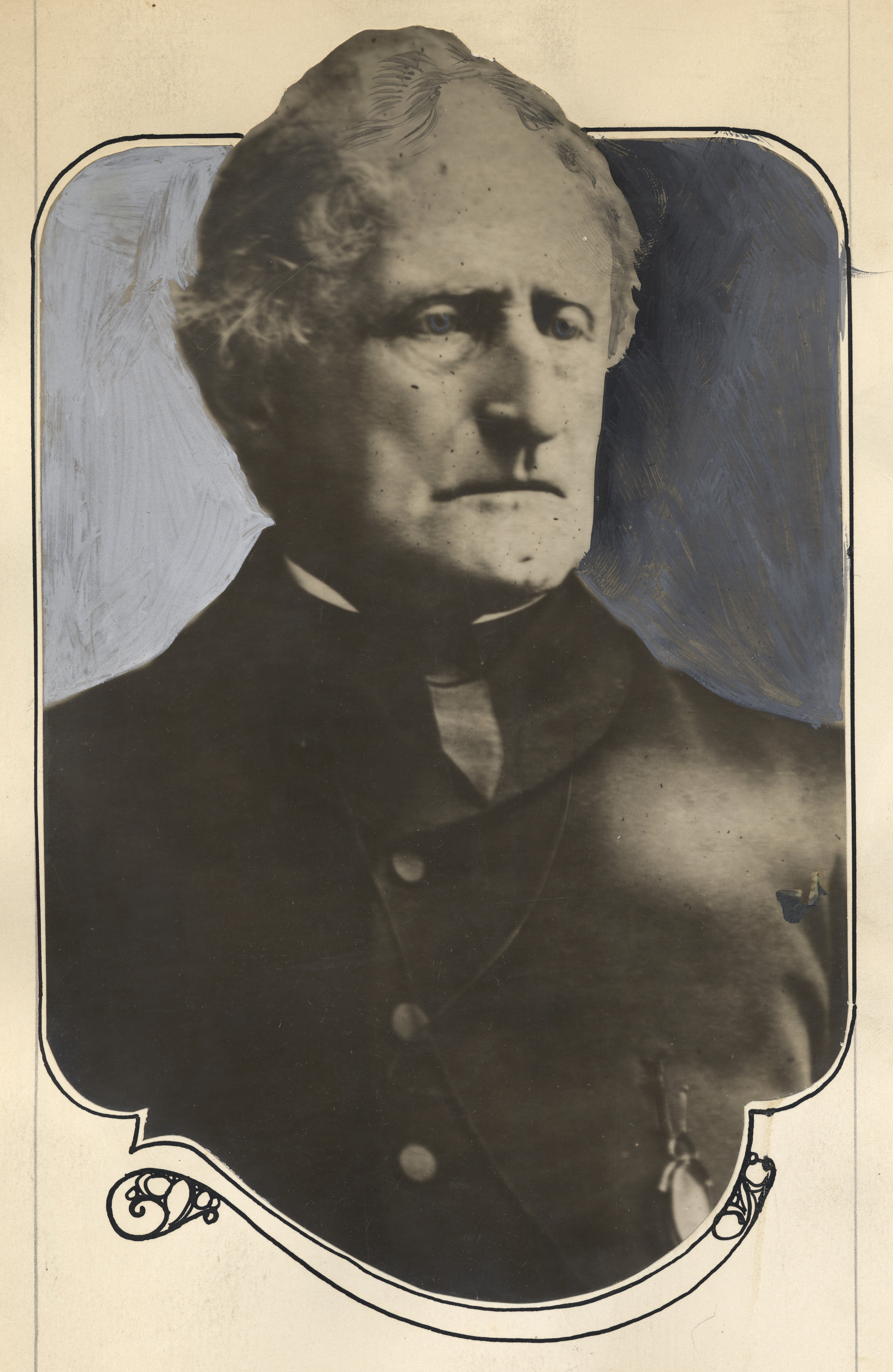
- Born: January 1, 1800; Staten Island, New York
- Died: February 14, 1894 (aged 94); San Francisco, California
- Burial place: Cypress Lawn Memorial Park

Jonathan Drake Stevenson (1800–1894) was born in New York; won a seat in the New York State Assembly; was the commanding officer of the First Regiment of New York Volunteers during the Mexican–American War in California; entered California mining and real estate businesses; and died in San Francisco on February 14, 1894.

== New York state politics ==
Stevenson became the protégé of New York Governor Daniel D. Tompkins and served as his private secretary, and accompanied him to Washington in that capacity when Tompkins was elected Vice President in 1816. His friendship with prominent politicians and his helping to expose the Glentworth election frauds of 1839 gained him a certain stature in the Democratic Party. He supported James K. Polk for the Presidency in 1844, and was a member of the New York State Assembly (New York Co.) in 1846.

== Regiment of New York Volunteers ==
In 1846, President Polk offered Stevenson the command of a regiment of volunteers to be raised as part of the American occupation army during the Mexican–American War in California. Colonel Stevenson raised a volunteer regiment of ten companies of 77 men each or 770 men to go to California with the understanding that they would be muster out and stay in California. On 1 August 1846, the regiment was mustered into Federal service as the "Seventh" New York Volunteers. Stevenson with his Regiment of New York Volunteers sailed around Cape Horn for California on September 26, 1846, and arrived at San Francisco March 7, 1847. After his arrival in San Francisco, Stevenson joined General Stephen W. Kearny at Monterey and was made commander of the post. In May 1847, he became the military commander of the southern district of California with headquarters in Los Angeles. In 1848, an order was received by Colonel R.B. Mason, directing that Colonel Stevenson's regiment should be designated thereafter the "1st Regiment of New York Volunteers" instead of the "Seventh".

== Post bellum ==
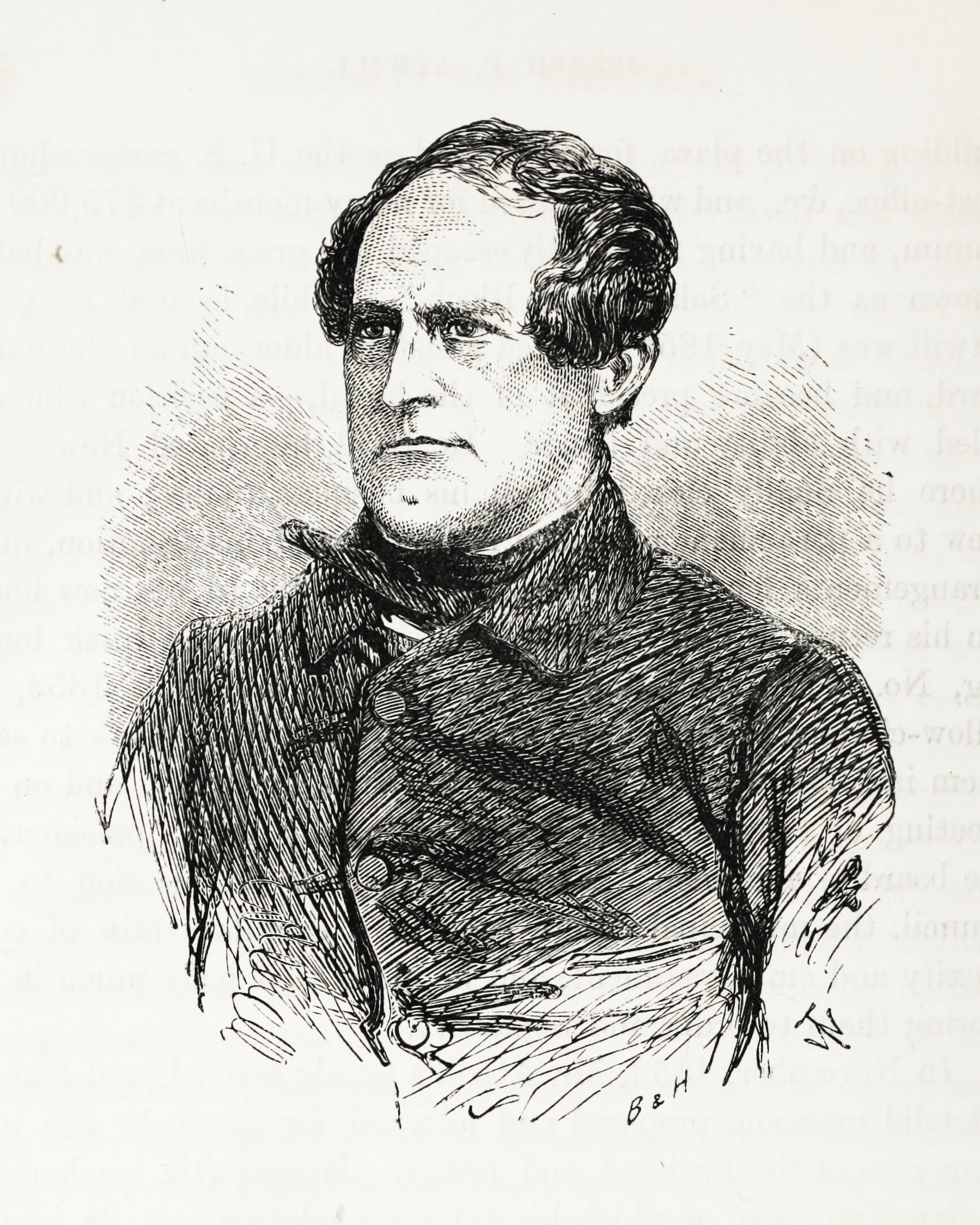
Engraving of Stevenson from 1855

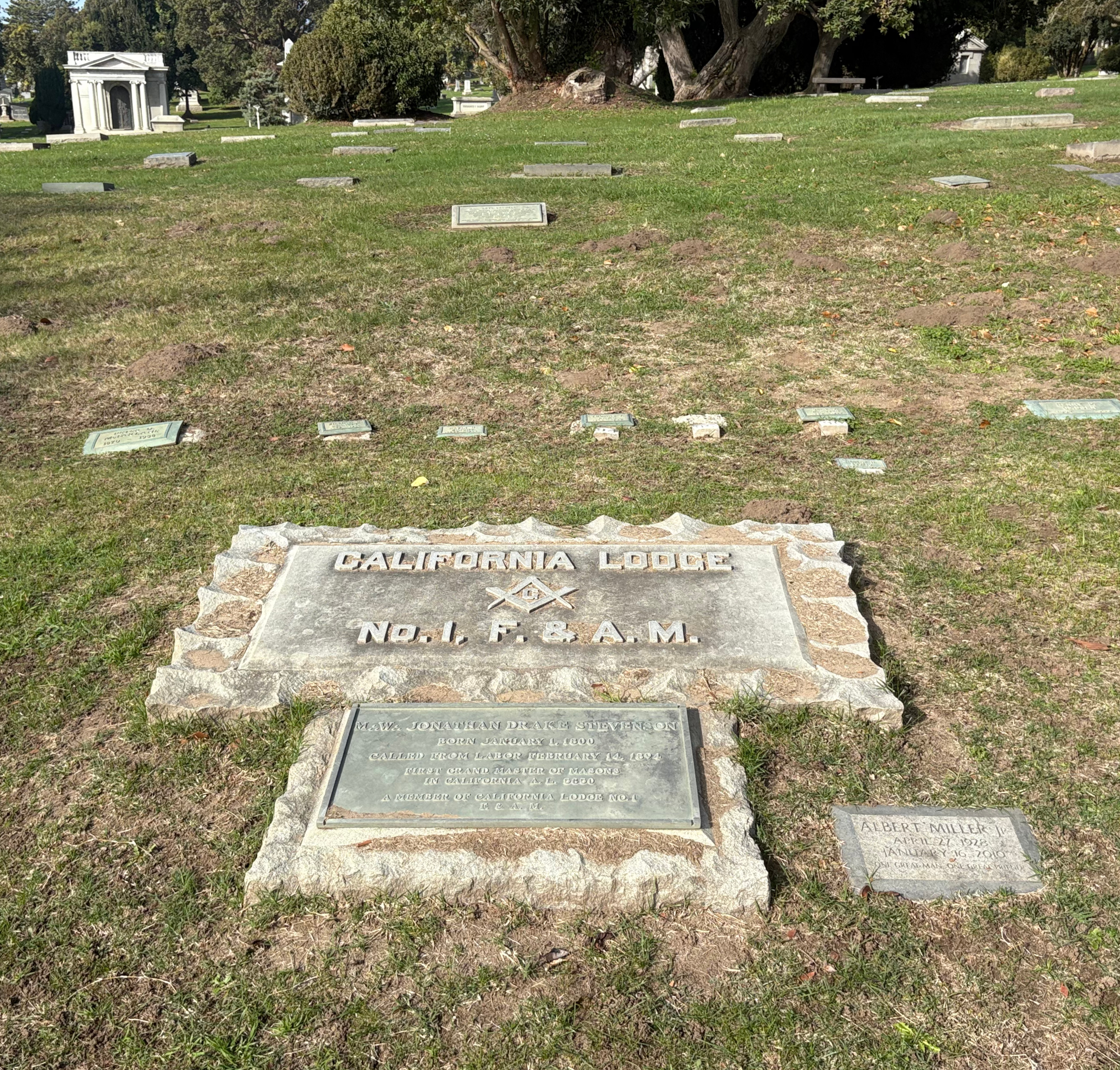
Stevenson's grave at Cypress Lawn Memorial Park

When his regiment was mustered out of service in 1848, Stevenson traveled to the mining community of Mokelumne Hill. He was appointed alcalde of the settlement, and drew up a code of mining laws and regulations. He returned to San Francisco to enter the real estate business with Dr. William C. Parker, who had been assistant surgeon in the Regiment of New York Volunteers. He bought the southern half of Rancho Los Medanos in 1849 and laid out a site for a town they called "New York of the Pacific", which was changed to Pittsburg in 1911. He was active in Freemasonry. In 1850 he participated in organizing the Grand Lodge of California, and served as its first Grand Master. He was appointed Shipping Commissioner for the Port of San Francisco in 1872. He died in San Francisco on February 14, 1894, and was buried at Cypress Lawn Memorial Park in Colma. A street in San Francisco, Stevenson Street, is named for him.
