= Hale Creek =

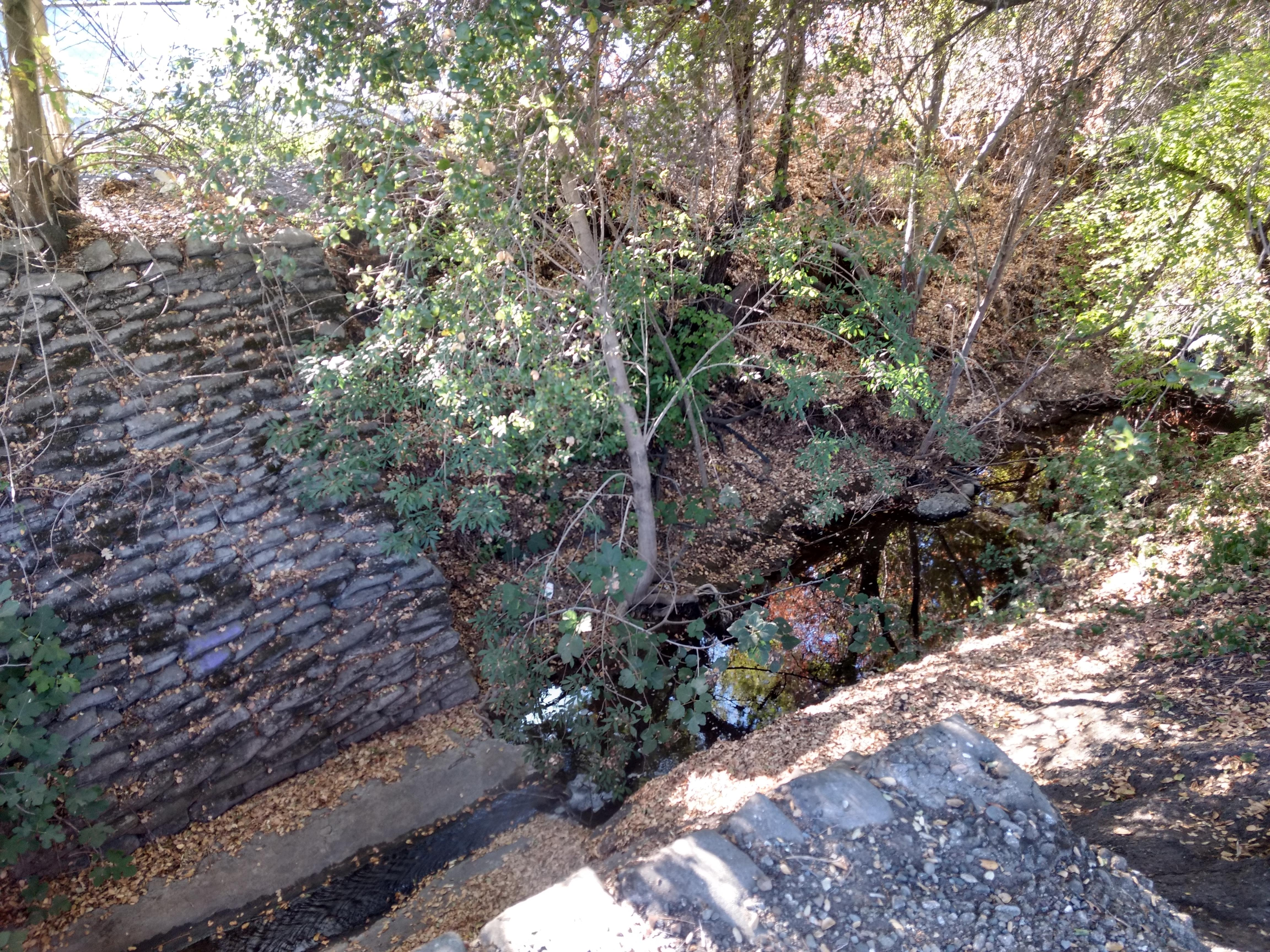
- Hale Creek in Los Altos, California

Location
- Country: United States
- State: California
- Region: Santa Clara County

Physical characteristics
- Source: Foothills in Rancho San Antonio Open Space Preserve
  - location: Los Altos Hills, California
  - coordinates: 37°20′46″N 122°08′08″W
  - elevation: 950 ft (290 m)
- Mouth: Permanente Creek
  - location: Mountain View, California
  - coordinates: 37°23′00″N 122°05′25″W
  - elevation: 108 ft (33 m)

Basin features
- Tributaries
  - left: Summerville Creek
  - right: Magdalena Creek, Loyola Creek

Hale Creek is a short stream originating in the foothills of the town of Los Altos Hills in Santa Clara County, California, United States. Its source is in the Rancho San Antonio Open Space Preserve, west of Neary Quarry. The creek flows northeasterly 4.6 miles (7.4 km) through the cities of Los Altos Hills, Los Altos, and Mountain View before joining Permanente Creek.

== History ==
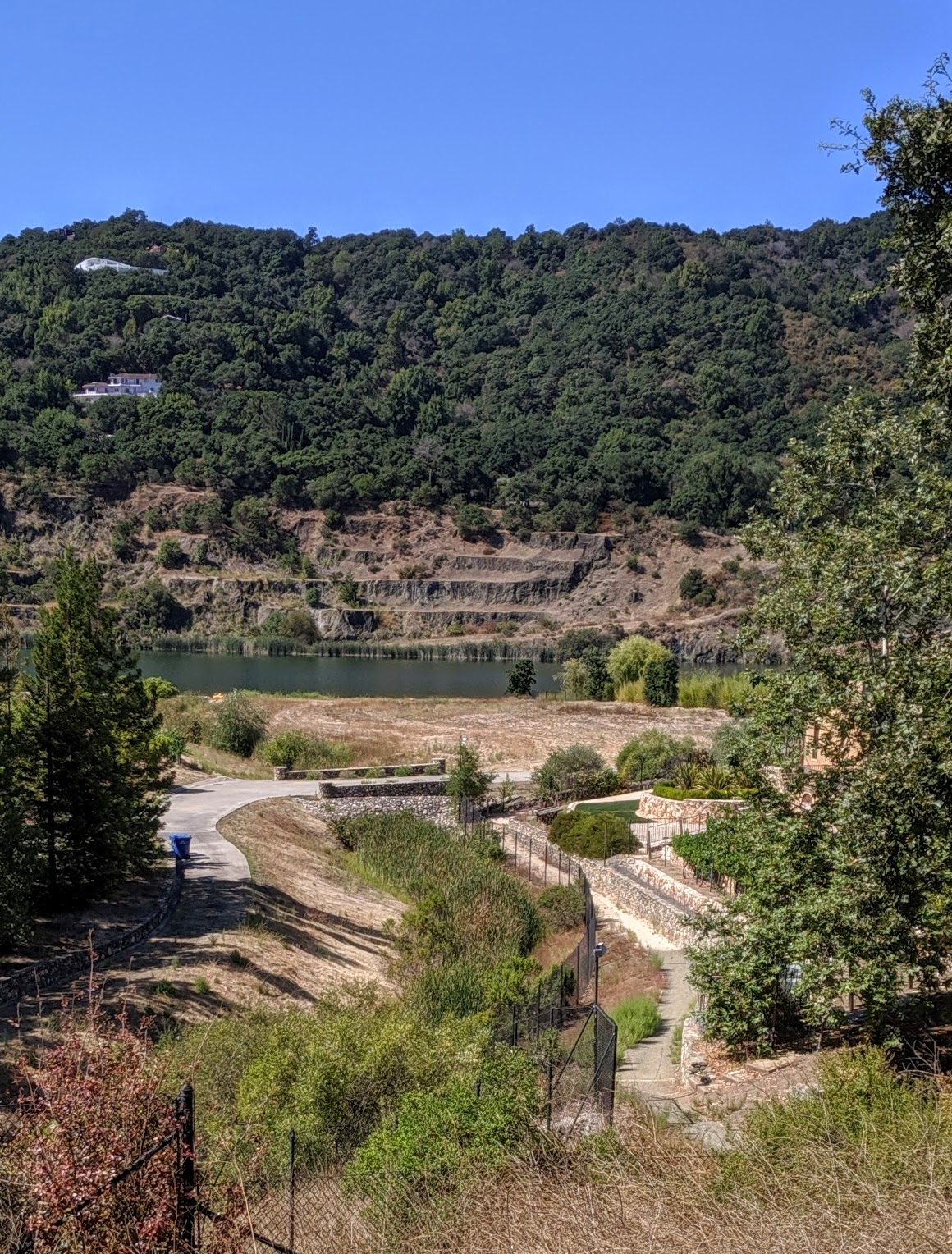
A view of Hale Creek at its outflow from Neary Quarry in Los Altos Hills, California, from the Mary Stutz Path

Hale Creek is named for Joseph P. Hale, who at one time owned most of the Rancho San Antonio land grant. Hale was an Irish immigrant who became one of the largest land owners in the west, thanks to marrying Catarina Castro, the daughter of a large Spanish grant holder in Mexico in 1859. He bought 2,000 acres of Juana Briones's original ranch and was one of Los Altos' earliest large land owners. He and four other families lived on the Hale Ranch.

In the 1930s, Neary Rock Quarry was dug on upper Hale Creek. The quarry supplied base rock for the construction of Moffett Field and crushed rock for Highway 101 and Interstate 280. In 2006, Los Altos Hills approved the construction of the Quarry Hills subdivision, consisting of 22 upscale homes and an eleven-acre lake, by damming the outflow from the quarry to Hale Creek.

The Juan Prado Mesa Preserve in Los Altos Hills, along Hale Creek below Neary Quarry, was created in 1970 and named for the original holder of the Rancho San Antonio land grant, Juan Prado Mesa. The preserve's Mary Stutz Path that follows the creek can be accessed at the top from Stonebrook Road and at the bottom from Dawson Drive. Juan Prado Mesa was born in Santa Clara in 1806, grandson of Corporal José Valerio Mesa who came to California with the Anza Expedition, and served as a soldier at the San Francisco Presidio becoming Alférez in 1835. Governor Juan Alvarado granted the 7,982-acre (32.30 km^{2}) Rancho San Antonio to Juan Prado Mesa in 1839.

== Watershed ==
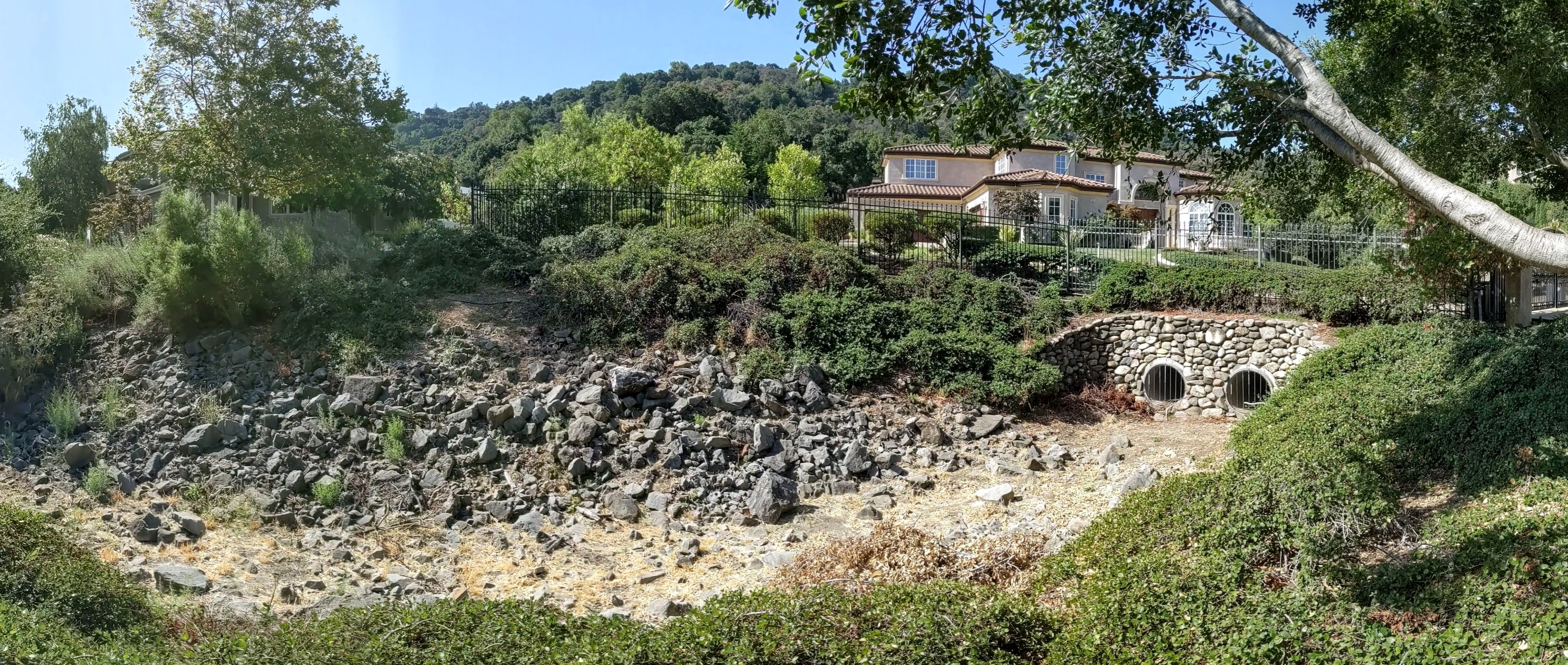
Hale Creek just above Neary Quarry, where it traverses several luxury home sites in its source canyon

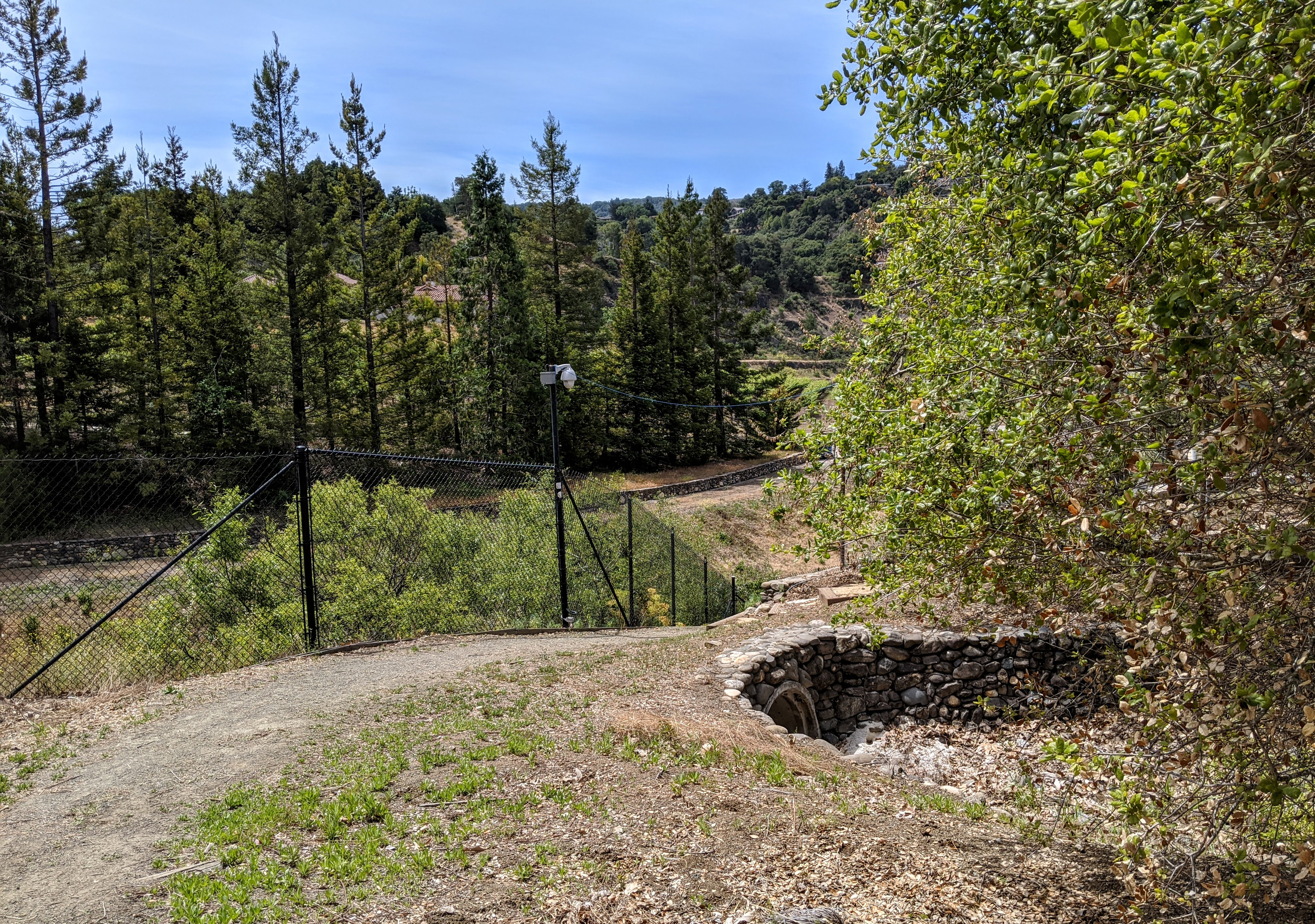
Two branches of Hale Creek merge by a trail crossing; the branch coming from the right runs behind homes on the north side of Kate Drive, along the Mary Stutz Path, while the main branch across this side path flows from the Neary Quarry lake, which is behind the homes on the south side of Kate Drive.

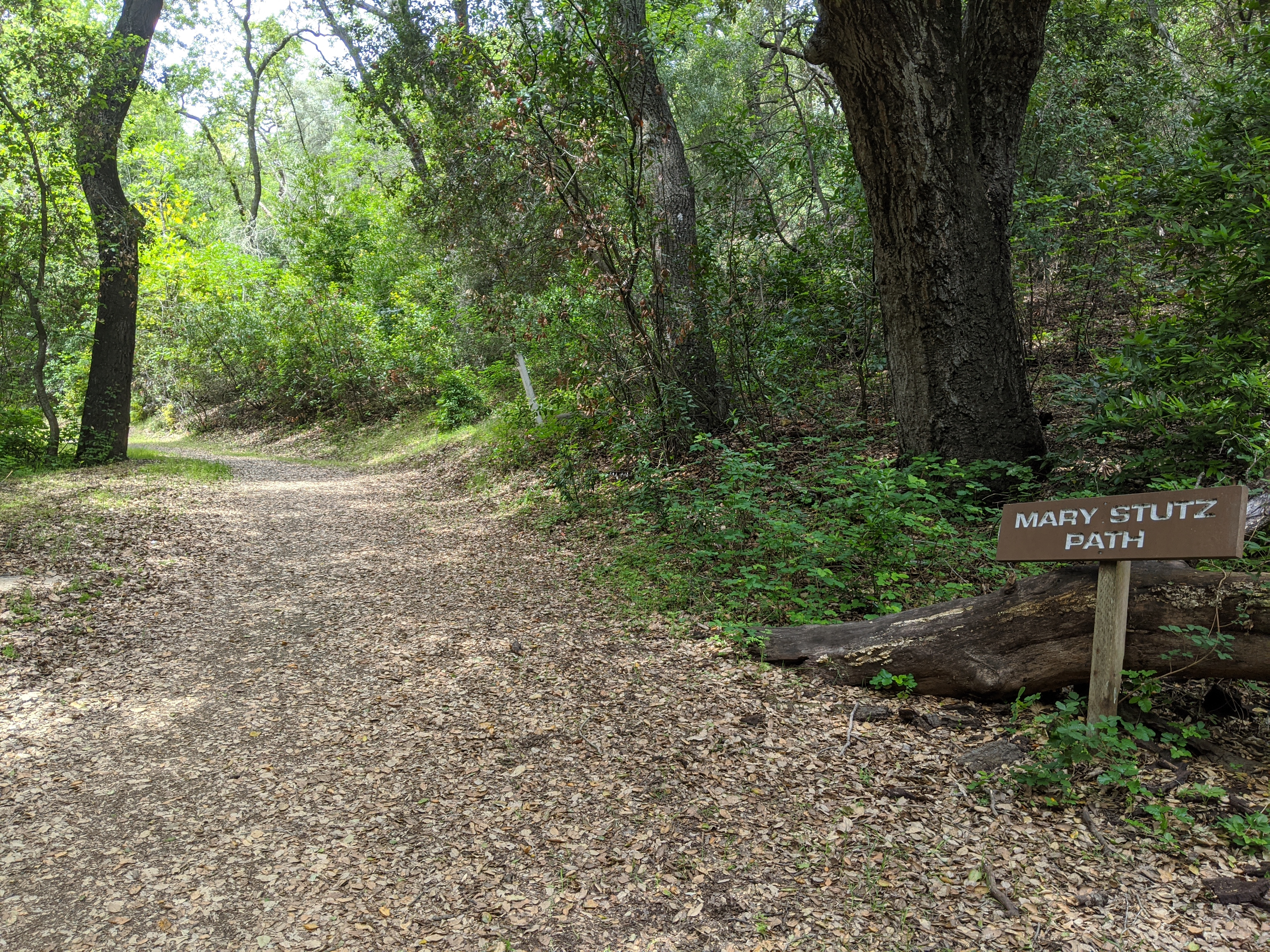
The Mary Stutz path along the creek in the Juan Prado Mesa Preserve in Los Altos Hills

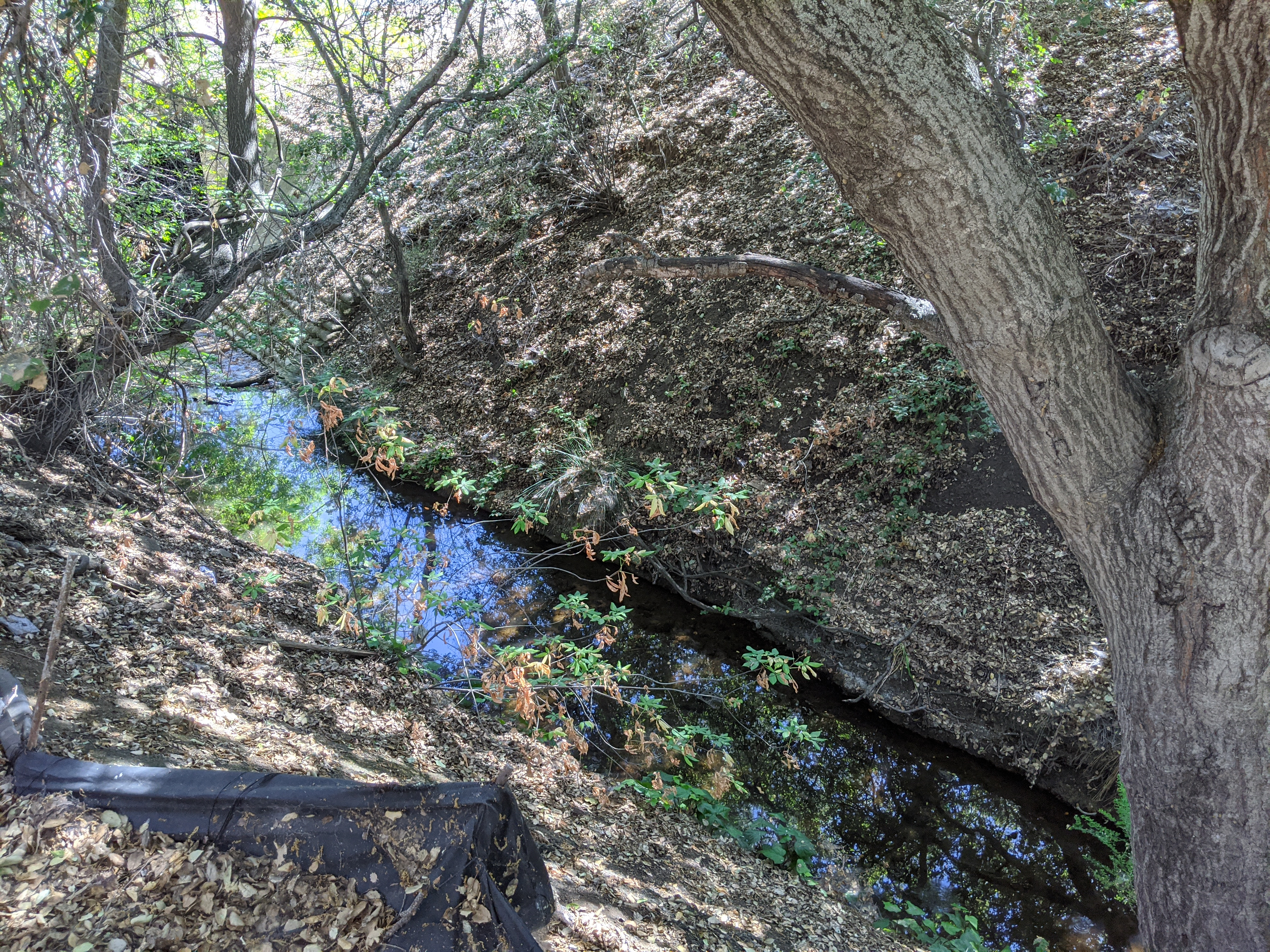
Hale Creek approaching Foothill Expressway, Los Altos

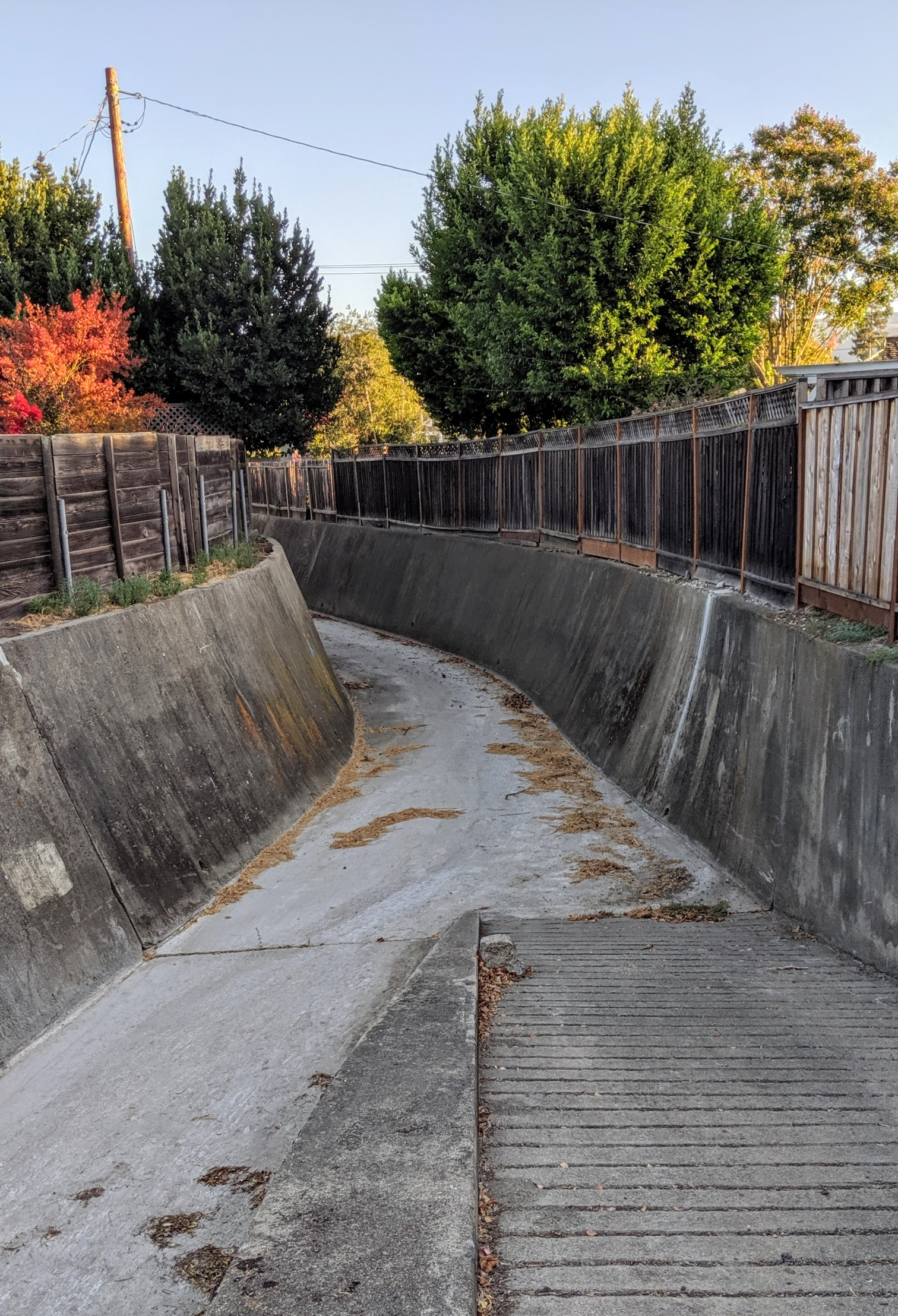
Hale Creek at Marilyn Drive in Mountain View. The creek flows in and out of Mountain View in two short stretches before its confluence with Permanente Creek in Los Altos.

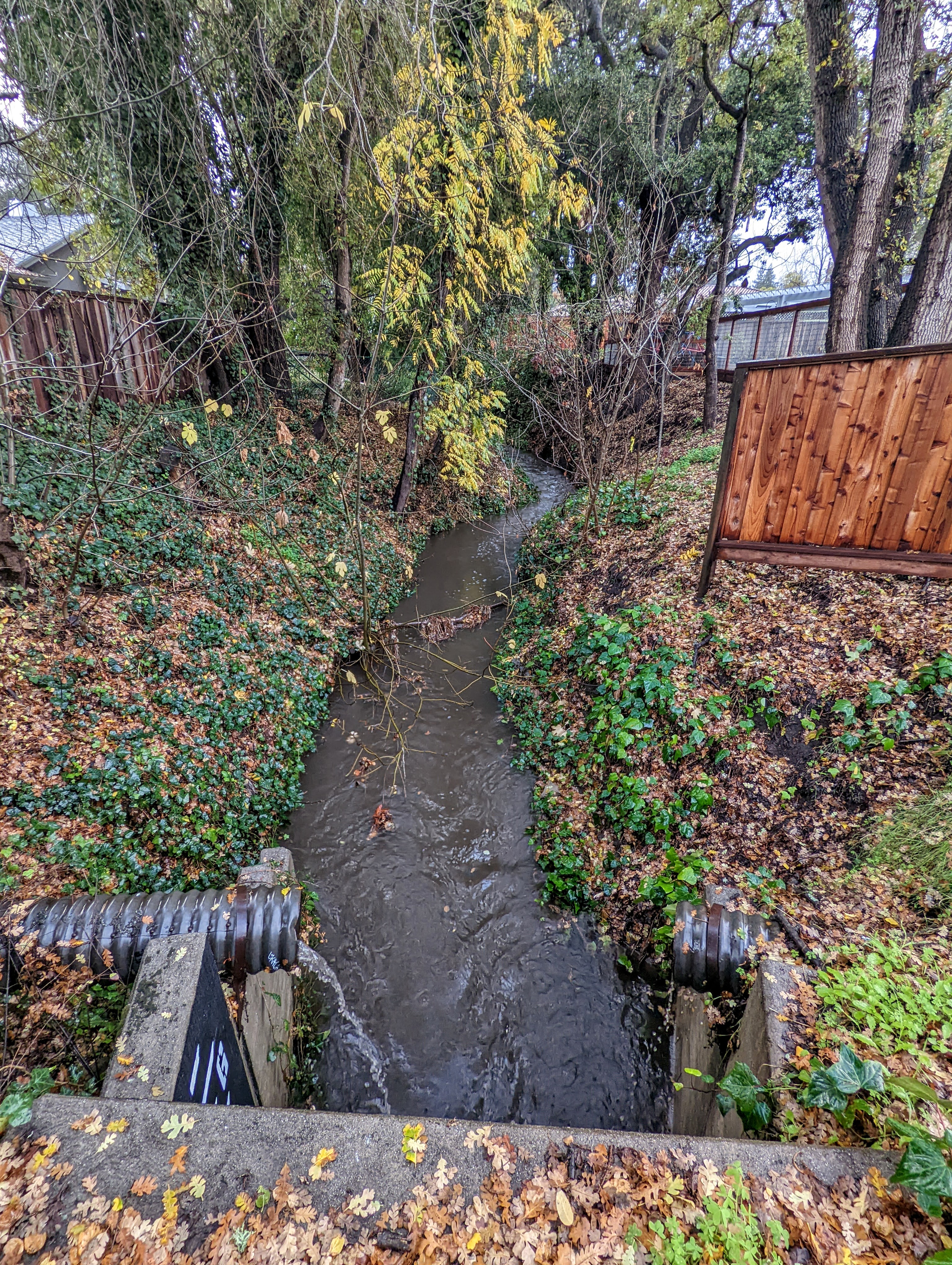
Hale Creek at Covington Road, Los Altos, after a rain in December 2021

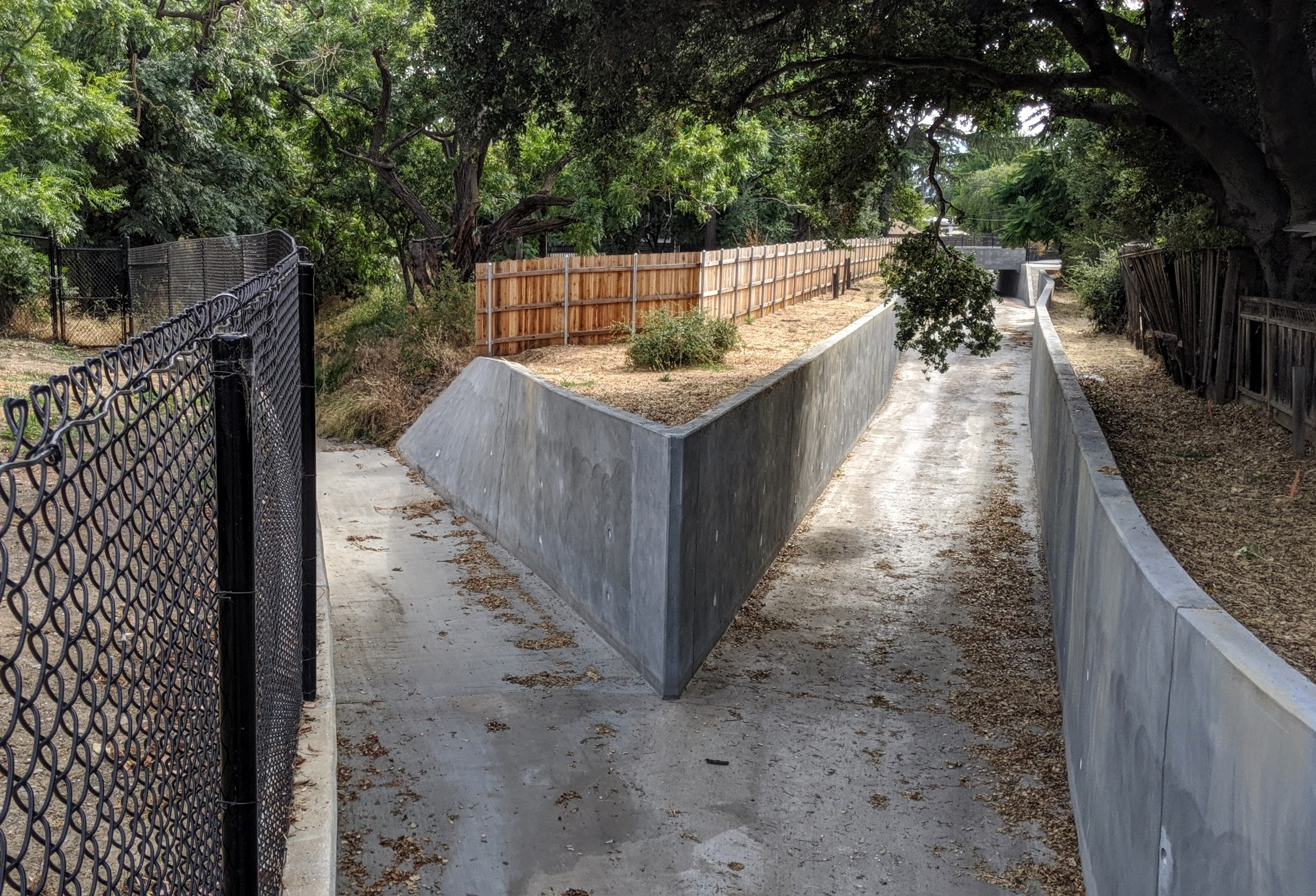
Hale Creek and Permanente Creek are dry in August 2019, but when they flow their confluence is here in Los Altos (as viewed from the Mountain View side, off the end of Valencia Avenue). Permanente Creek (left and foreground) transitions here from a more natural channel to the concrete channel; Hale Creek (right) ends here.

Hale Creek drains an area of approximately 5 square miles (13 km^{2}) and has three minor tributaries. The source is at about 950 feet (290 m) elevation just north of the Chamise Trail in the Rancho San Antonio Open Space Preserve in the little valley that flows easterly down to the north side of Neary Quarry. According to the Oakland Museum's map Guide to San Francisco Bay Area Creeks, Hale Creek's tributaries (heading downstream) are Magdalena Creek on the right, then Summerville Creek on the left, then Loyola Creek on the right – all entering Hale Creek downstream of Interstate 280. Hale Creek terminates at its confluence with Permanente Creek between Mountain View Avenue in Los Altos and Valencia Avernue in Mountain View, south of McKelvey Park.

Hale Creek is part of the Santa Clara Valley Water District's (SCVWD) Permanente Creek Flood Protection Project which aims to install overflow basins along Hale and Permanente Creeks to catch one hundred year flood waters in order to protect 1,664 parcels (1,378 homes, 160 businesses and 4 schools/institutions) downstream of El Camino Real (saving potential damages in excess of $47.9 million) and prevent flooding of Middlefield Road and Central Expressway, by 12/30/2016 and also to identify opportunities for environmental enhancement such as stream restoration, as well as trails, parks, and open space. From its confluence with Permanente Creek upstream to Rose/Rosita Avenue, the channel has been set in a straight concrete channel to move storm flows – at Marilyn Drive it is dated 1952 and at Arboleda Drive it is dated 1960. The concrete sides transition smoothly from rectangle to trapezoid just over 30 feet north of Arboleda Drive. However the SCVWD in 2012 proposed widening and/or deepening this concrete channel.

== Ecology ==
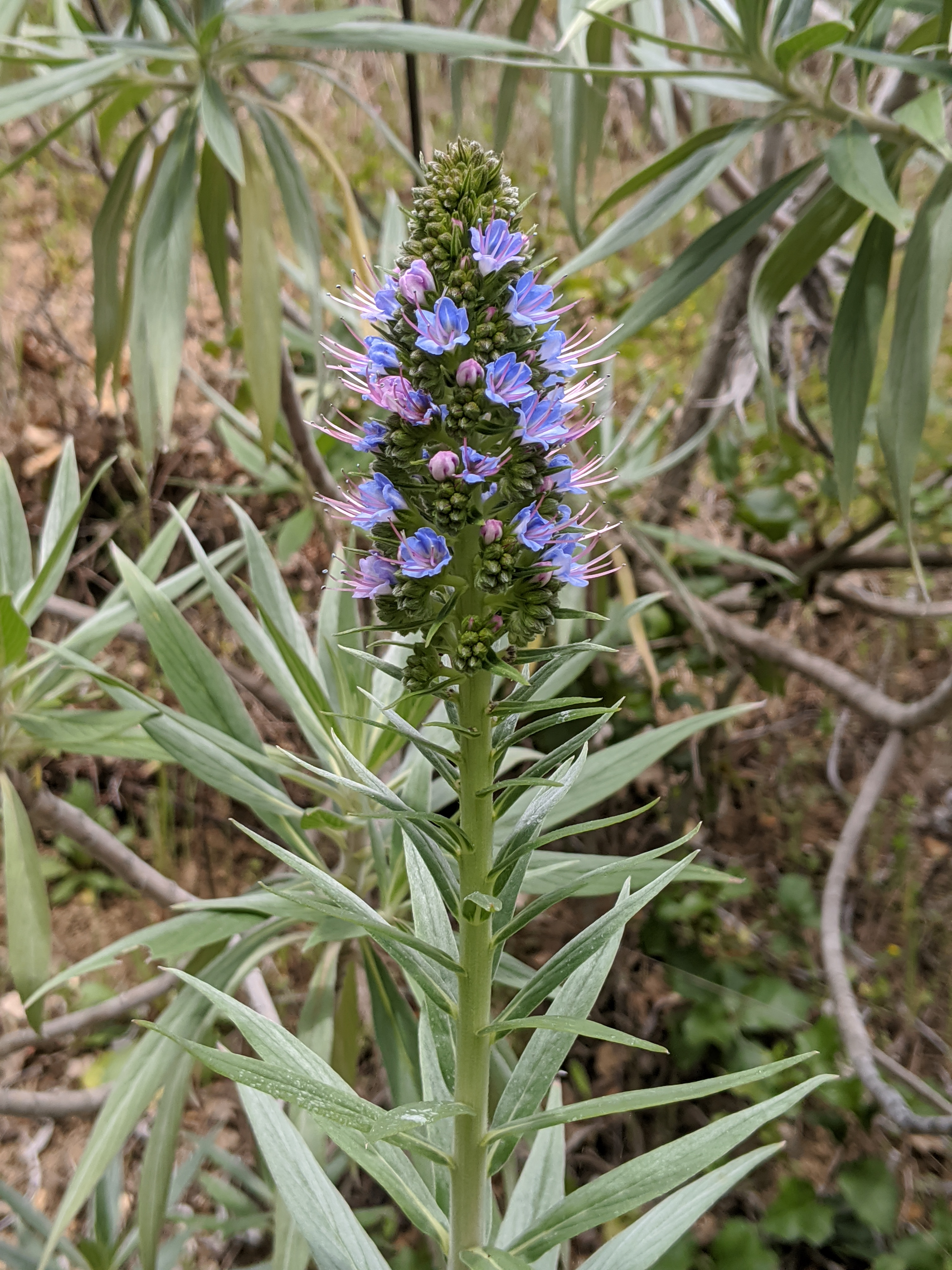
A flowering pride of Madeira, by Hale Creek and the Mary Stutz Path

A fish distribution study found no Steelhead Trout (Oncorhynchus mykiss) at two locations sampled in August 1981. However, the fact that Hale Creek is a tributary to a historic trout stream (Permanente Creek) suggests that steelhead may have used the stream.

== See also ==
- List of watercourses in the San Francisco Bay Area
