= Neary Quarry =

Gravel pit and rock quarry

Coordinates: 37°21′0″N 122°7′14″W

The Neary Quarry, operated as Neary Rock Quarry, Inc., by George H. Neary Jr. and Ethyl Neary, was a gravel pit and rock quarry in Santa Clara County, California, around which the town of Los Altos Hills incorporated. Neary Quarry is now a lake formed by damming Hale Creek, on private property of a homeowners' association in the Quarry Hills development of luxury homes.

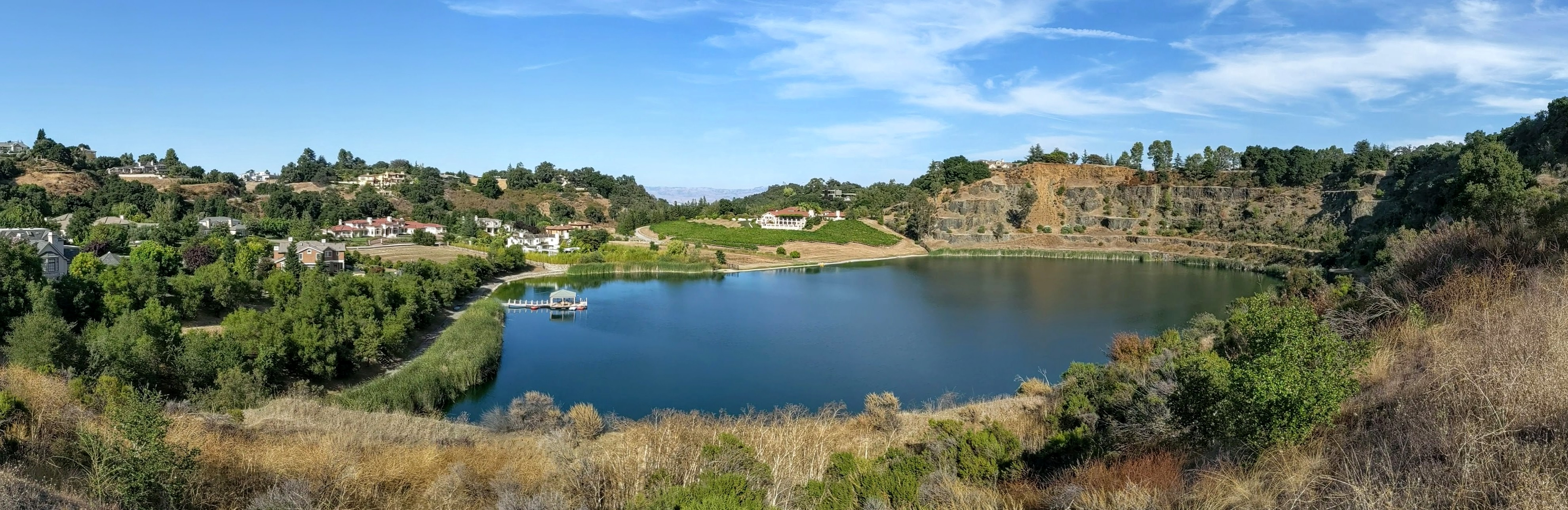
The Neary Quarry lake on the dammed Hale Creek, viewed from the southwest rim

== History ==
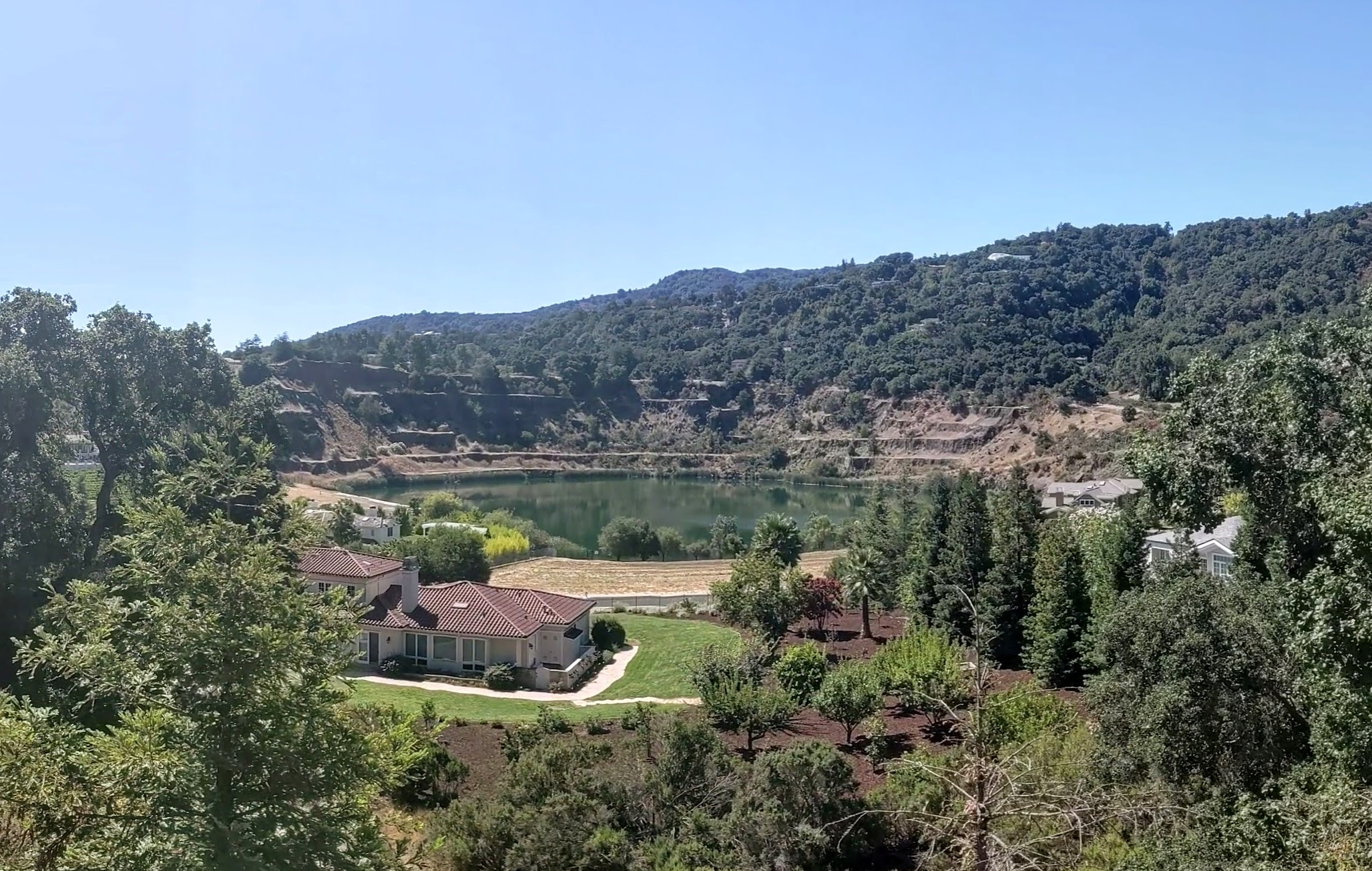
View from the north along Stonebrook Drive

Neary Quarry operated since 1927, and continuously since 1935, supplying the stone and gravel for building US Highway 101 and Interstate 280, and for the Moffett Field runways, as well as for some of the roads in Los Altos Hills. It closed in the 1960s.

The quarry business had a rather adversarial relationship with the residents of the town of Los Altos Hills, dating from before the town's incorporation in 1956, due to the trucks that would use the town's roads, particularly Stonebrook Drive. After the first year of incorporation, the town rejected an offer by the quarry operators to maintain a truck route. After the town passed an ordinance prohibiting trucks over 12 tons on town roads, and started ticketing drivers working for the quarry's customers, the quarry sued the town and won an injunction against enforcement of the ordinance, and finally won against the town's appeal on August 10, 1959.

The Town of Los Altos Hills took 12 years to approve a housing development of 22 luxury homes around the former quarry, and an 11 acre lake. It was finally approved in 1996, with detailed plan approval in 1998.
