= Bayhill Shuttle =

Bayhill Shuttle is a shuttle route in San Bruno, California operated by SamTrans.

The bus system offers commute hour service on one line connecting the office parks and business district of Bayhill with The Shops at Tanforan Mall, El Camino Real and the San Bruno BART station. The service is free and in a loop around the office park back to BART weekdays only.
