= South San Francisco station =

South San Francisco station may refer to:

- South San Francisco station (BART), a rapid transit station
- South San Francisco station (Caltrain), a commuter rail station
