= Tanforan =

Tanforan may refer to one of these locations near San Bruno, California:

- Tanforan Assembly Center, a transfer center for interned Japanese Americans during World War II
- Tanforan Racetrack, also known as Tanforan Park, was a thoroughbred horse racing facility in San Bruno which operated from 1899 to 1964
- The Shops at Tanforan, a shopping mall built upon the site of the Tanforan Assembly Center
