= South San Francisco station (BART) =

Rapid transit station in San Francisco Bay Area

South San Francisco
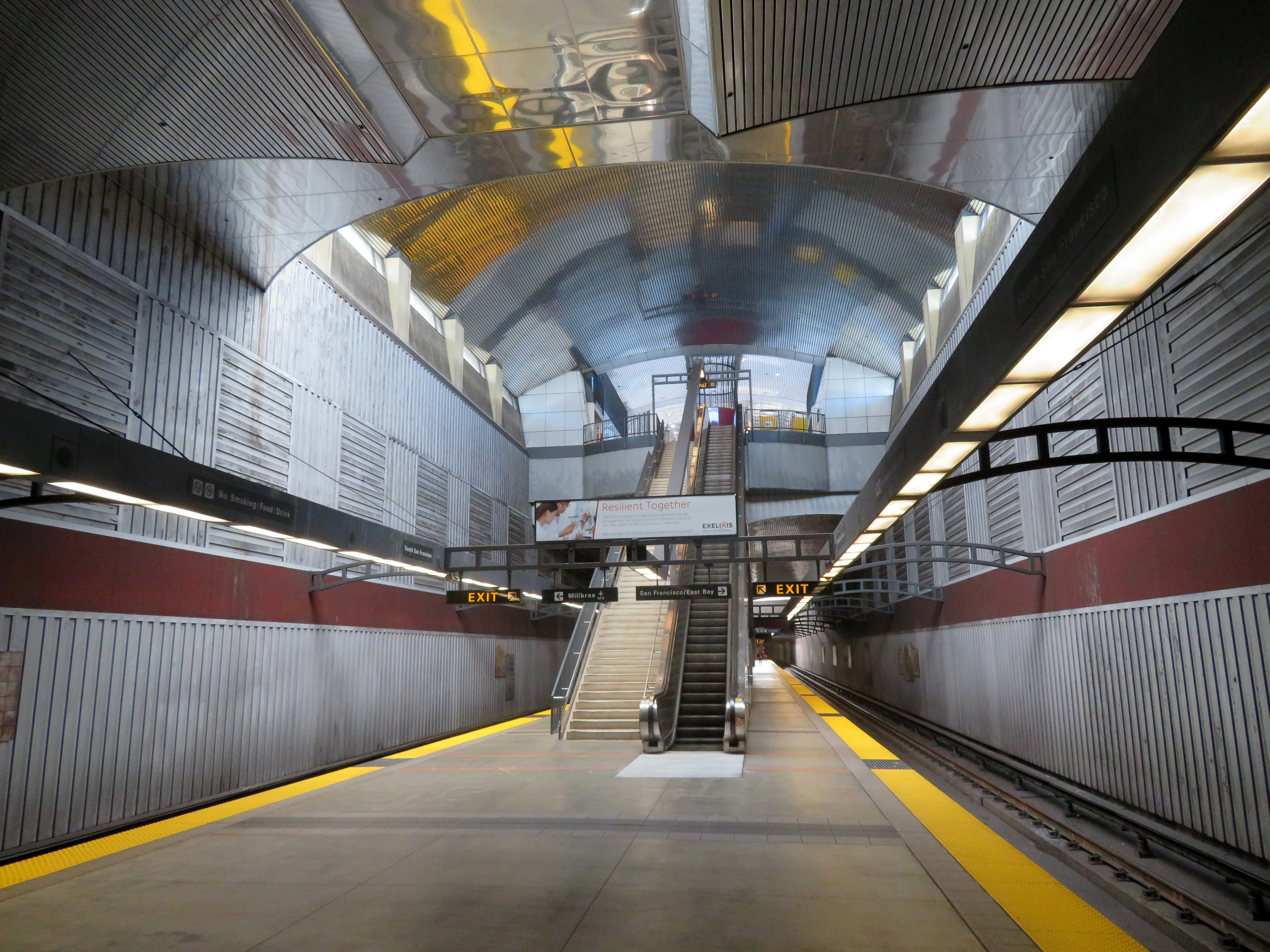
- The platform at South San Francisco station in 2018

General information
- Location: 1333 Mission Road; South San Francisco, California
- Coordinates: 37.6642°N 122.4440°W
- Line: BART W-Line
- Platforms: 1 island platform
- Tracks: 2
- Connections: Commute.org: Genesis One Tower Place, Oyster Point Shuttle, Utah/Grand Shuttle; SamTrans: ECR, 35, 122, 130; South City Shuttle: Blue, Green

Construction
- Structure type: Underground
- Parking: 3,500 spaces
- Cycle facilities: 30 lockers
- Accessible: Yes

Other information
- Station code: BART: SSAN

History
- Opened: June 22, 2003

Passengers
- 2025: 1,498 (weekday average)

Services
Preceding station	Bay Area Rapid Transit	Following station
San Bruno toward Millbrae	Red Line	Colma toward Richmond
San Bruno toward SFO or Millbrae	Yellow Line	Colma toward Antioch via Pittsburg/Bay Point
Former services
Preceding station	Bay Area Rapid Transit	Following station
San Bruno toward Millbrae	Dublin/Pleasanton–Millbrae line 2008–2009	Colma toward Dublin/Pleasanton
San Bruno toward Millbrae	Dublin/Pleasanton–SFO/Millbrae line 2005–2008	Colma toward Dublin/Pleasanton
San Bruno toward SFO	Dublin/Pleasanton–SFO line 2003–2004	Colma toward Dublin/Pleasanton
Location

South San Francisco station is a Bay Area Rapid Transit (BART) station located in South San Francisco, California in northern San Mateo County. It consists of two main tracks and a shared underground island platform. The station is served by the Red and Yellow lines.

Service at the station began on June 22, 2003 as part of the BART San Mateo County Extension project that extended BART service southward from Colma to Millbrae and San Francisco International Airport. The station is the northern terminus of the Centennial Way Trail.

As of 2024, BART indicates "significant market, local support, and/or implementation barriers" that must be overcome to allow transit-oriented development on the surface parking lots at the station. Such development would not begin until at least the mid-2030s.

== Bus connections ==
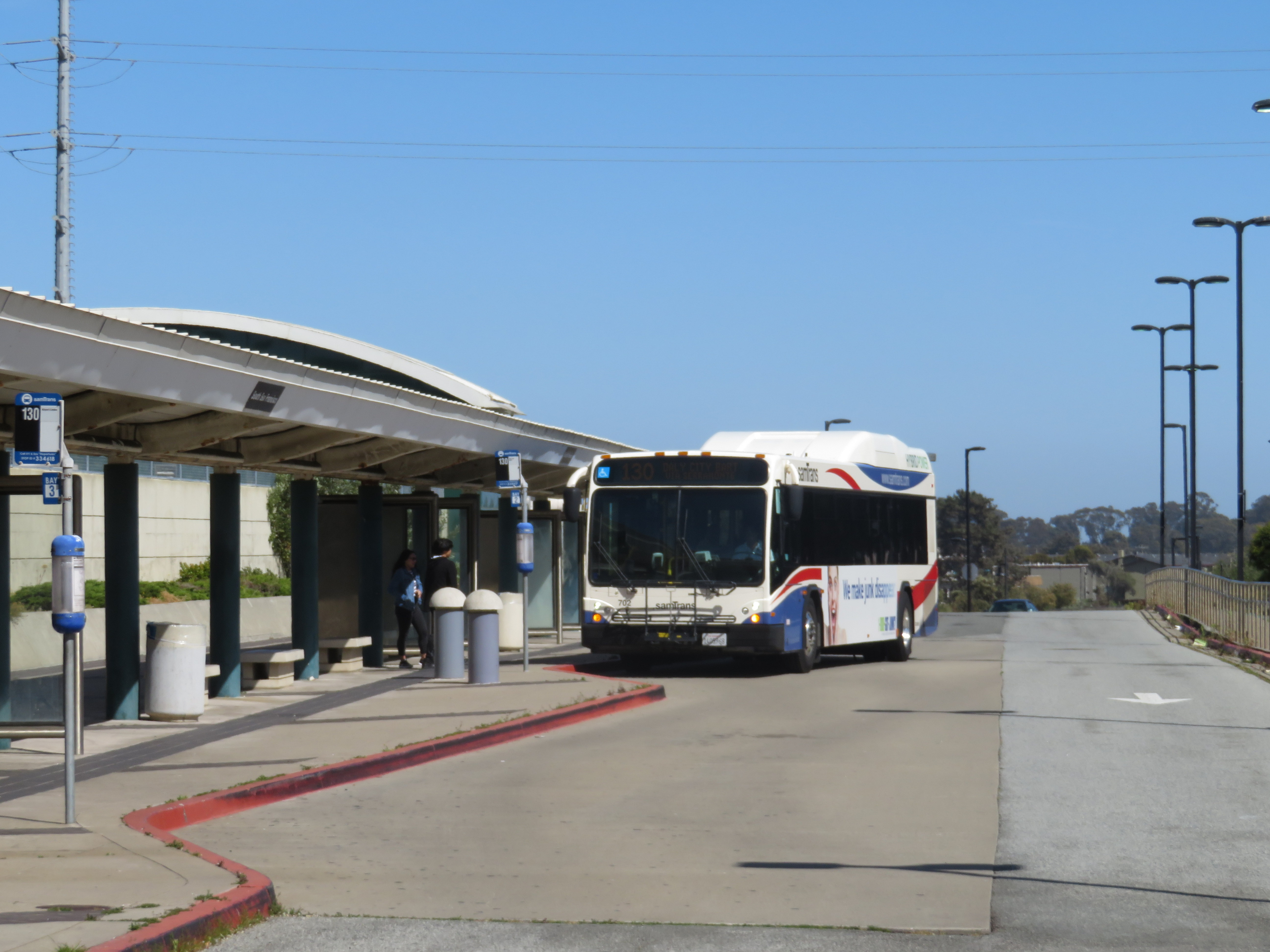
SamTrans bus in the west busway

SamTrans bus routes 122, and 130 stop in the busway on the west side of the station. Route ECR stops on El Camino Real west of the station. Route 35 stops at the corner of Mission Road and Evergreen Drive on the east side of the station.

Several Commute.org local shuttle routes also serve the station. The Utah/Grand Shuttle and Genesis One Tower Place routes stop on the east busway; the Oyster Place Shuttle route stops in the west busway. The city-operated South City Shuttle Blue and Green routes also uses the east busway.
