= Daly City station =

Rapid transit station in California, US

Daly City
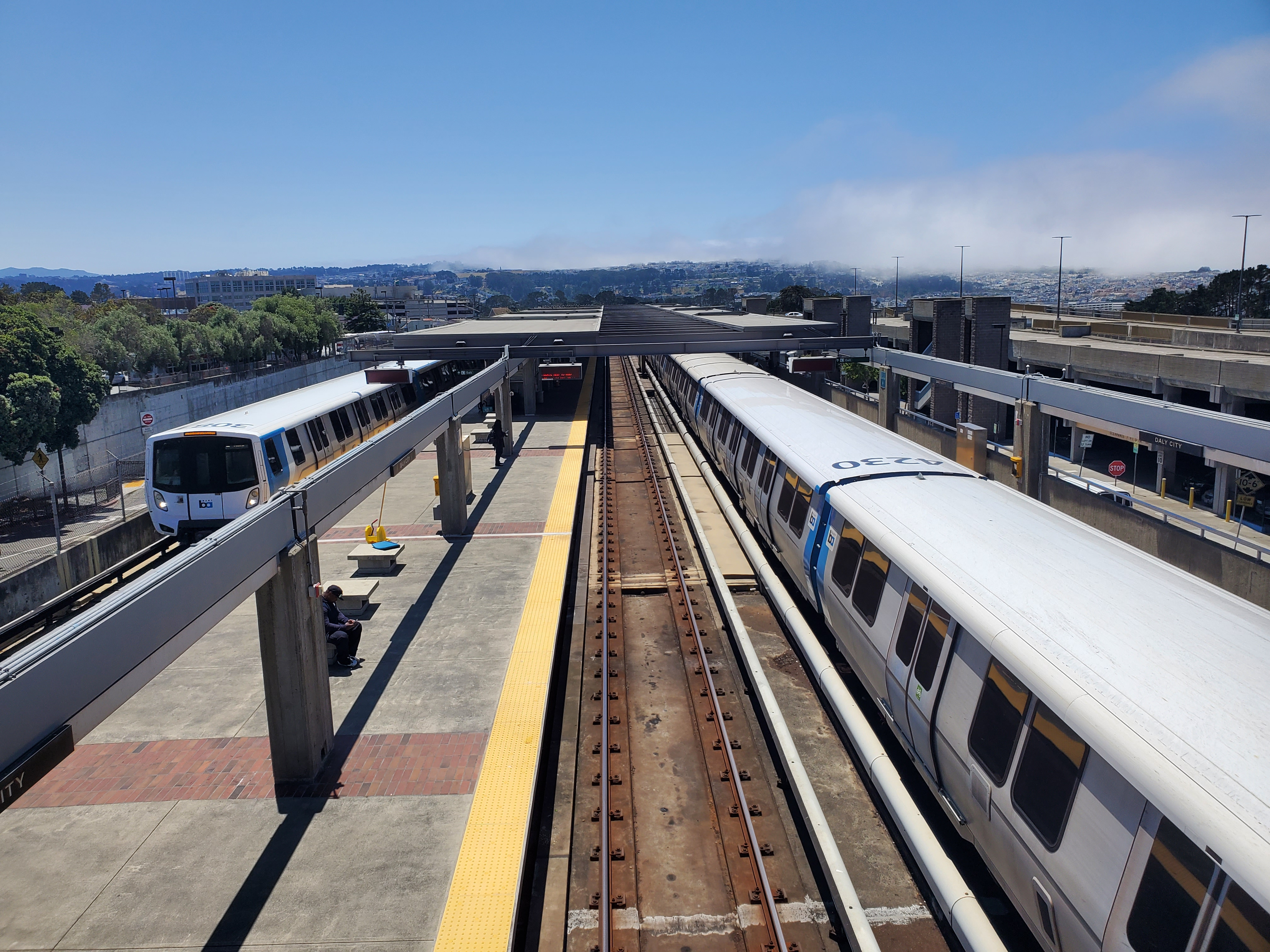
- Two trains at Daly City station in July 2023

General information
- Location: 500 John Daly Boulevard; Daly City, California
- Coordinates: 37.7062°N 122.4689°W
- Owner: San Francisco Bay Area Rapid Transit District
- Line: BART M-Line
- Platforms: 1 side platform, 1 island platform
- Tracks: 3
- Connections: Commute.org: Daly City Bayshore; Muni: 14R, 28, 28R, 54, 57, 58, 714; SamTrans: ECR, PCX, SKY, 120, 121, 10, 30, 110, 130; Seton Medical Center Shuttle; Skyline College Shuttle

Construction
- Structure type: Elevated
- Parking: 2,068 spaces
- Cycle facilities: 20 lockers
- Accessible: Yes
- Architect: Gerald McCue & Associates

Other information
- Station code: BART: DALY

History
- Opened: November 5, 1973

Passengers
- 2026: 5,626 (weekday average)

Services
Preceding station	Bay Area Rapid Transit	Following station
Terminus	Blue Line	Balboa Park toward Dublin/Pleasanton
Terminus	Green Line	Balboa Park toward Berryessa
Colma toward Millbrae	Red Line	Balboa Park toward Richmond
Colma toward SFO or Millbrae	Yellow Line	Balboa Park toward Antioch via Pittsburg/Bay Point
Location

Daly City station is an elevated Bay Area Rapid Transit (BART) station in Daly City, California, just south of the city limits of San Francisco. It is adjacent to Interstate 280 and California Route 1, which it serves as a park-and-ride station. The station is served by the Red, Yellow, Green, and Blue lines; it is the western terminus of the Green and Blue lines.

== Station layout ==
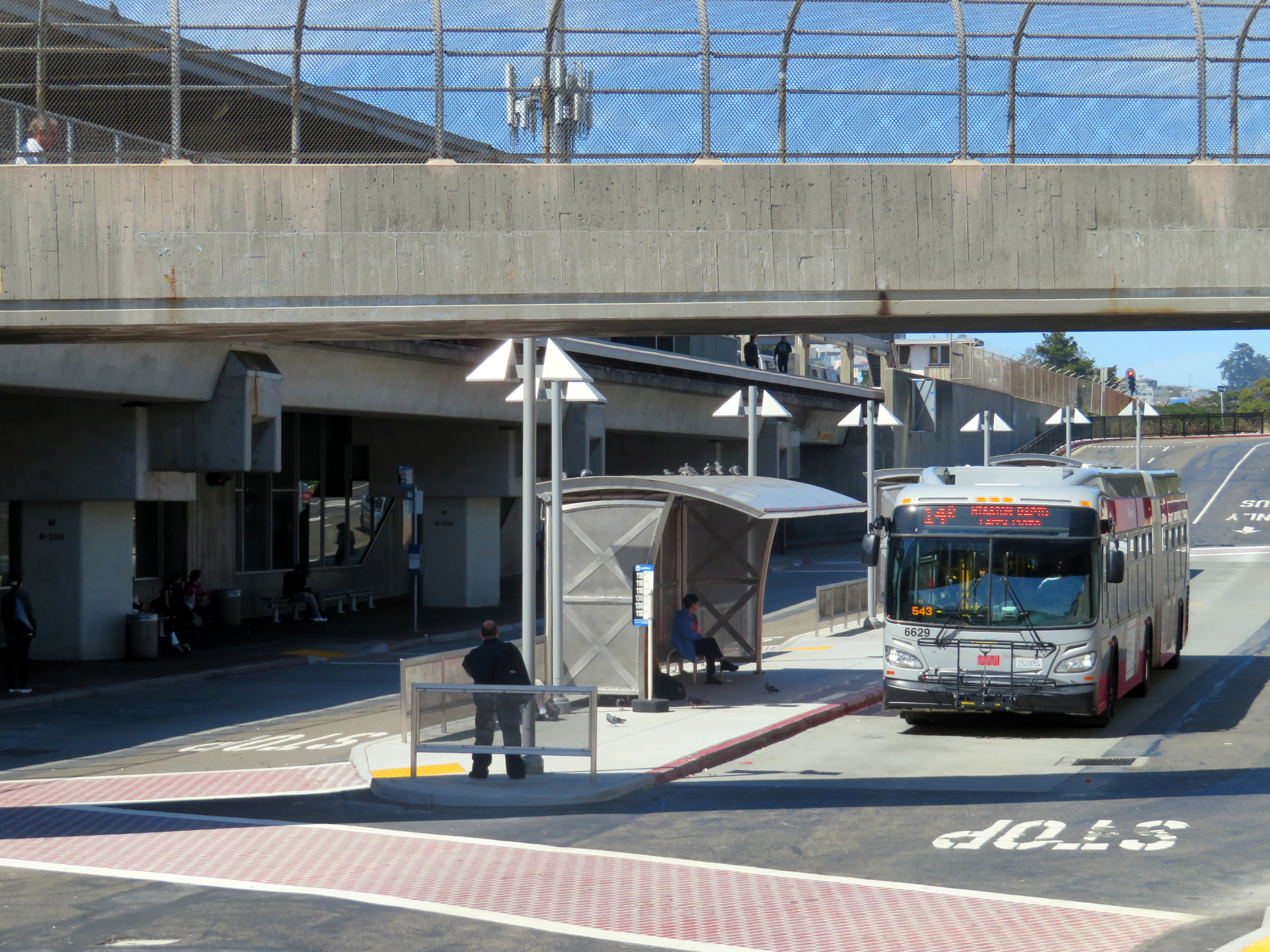
Muni route 14R bus in the east busway

Daly City station has three tracks, with an island platform serving the middle and eastern tracks and a side platform serving the western track. In regular operation, only the island platform is used for passenger boarding. The side platform is used only for passengers alighting from terminating Blue and Green line trains before they are taken out of service.

Daly City station is served by a number of SamTrans and Muni bus routes. Most routes use the Niantic Avenue busway on the east side of the station; Muni route 54 and the shuttle routes stop on the west side of the station.

- Commute.org: Daly City Bayshore
- Muni: 14R, 28, 28R, 54, 57, 58, 714
- SamTrans: ECR, 120, 121, 10, 30, 110, 130

Seton Medical Center and Skyline College operate free shuttles to the station.

== History ==
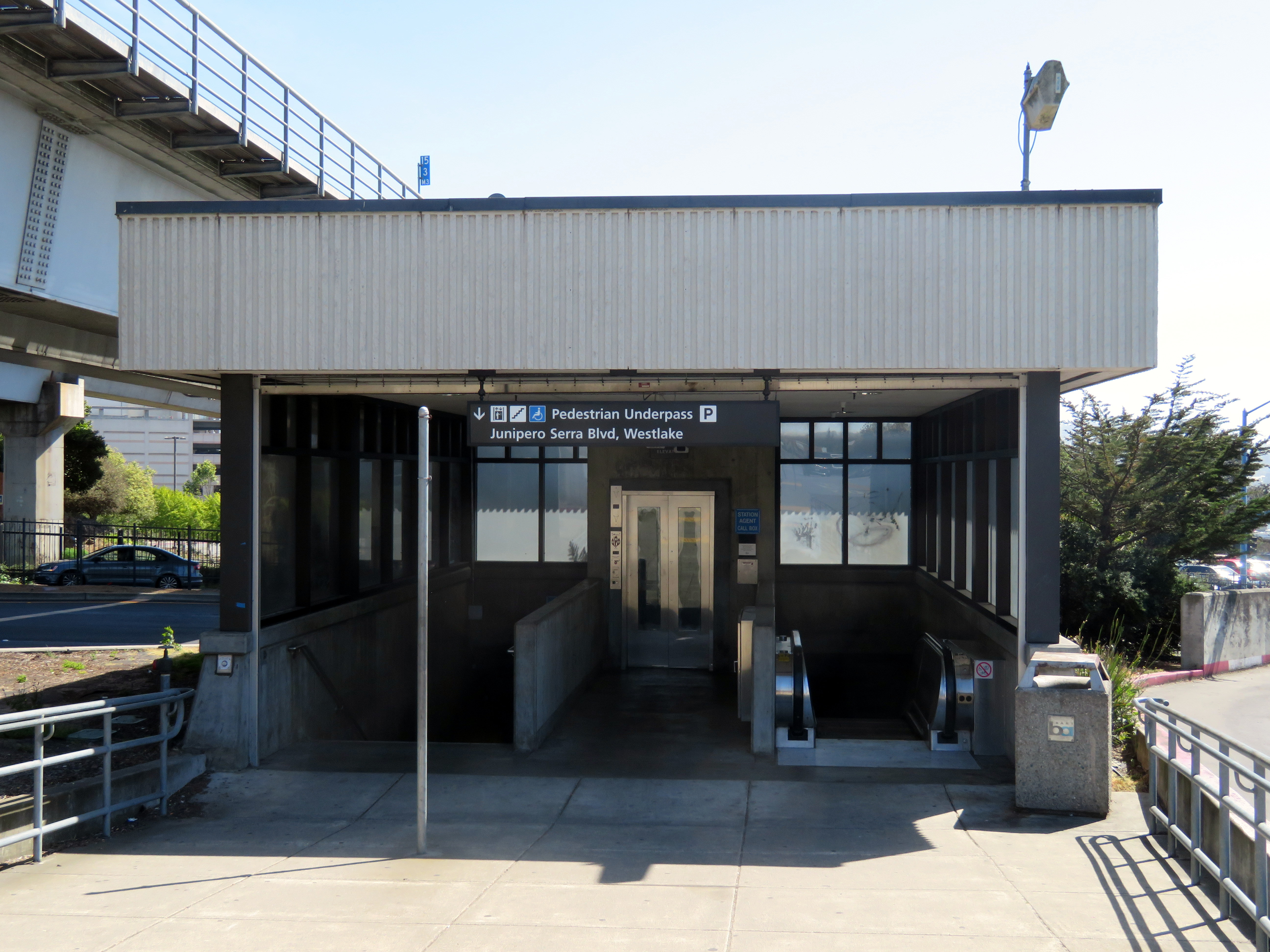
Entrance to the 1990s-built underpass

San Mateo County pulled out of plans for the BART system in 1961. However, BART retained plans for a station at the north edge of Daly City, just over the county line from San Francisco, because it was expected to draw significant revenue. The station would be paid for by taxes in other counties because of San Mateo County's withdrawal. The BART Board approved the name "Daly City" in December 1965. Original plans approved by voters in 1962 called for an elevated station at Daly City. BART later considered an underground station and rail yard at the site. In 1966, facing a budget deficit, BART relocated the yard to Hayward and reverted to plans for a less-expensive elevated station at Daly City.

The Daly City–Montgomery section of the San Francisco line opened on November 5, 1973. Transbay service began the next year. On September 30, 1975, BART began construction on a $3.3 million parking garage, which doubled the existing 800-space parking capacity at the station. Until the extension to Colma station in 1996, Daly City was the southern terminus of BART on the Peninsula and the only station that was not in one of the three base counties of San Francisco, Alameda and Contra Costa. It still serves as the southern terminus for the Green and Blue lines, which do not continue to other San Mateo County stations.

A pedestrian underpass of John Daly Boulevard connecting to additional parking lots opened in the 1990s. Seismic retrofitting of the station and parking garage took place in 2008–2010. As of 2024, BART indicates "significant market, local support, and/or implementation barriers" that must be overcome to allow transit-oriented development on the surface parking lots at the station. Such development would not begin until at least the mid-2030s.

Prior to 2026, trains terminating at Daly City used the center track to reverse direction at the station, while trains continuing southward used the west track. On August 10, 2026, BART changed the track assignments at the station. Terminating trains were moved to the west track, with southbound through trains moved to the center track. Northbound trains originating at the station were moved to the east track.

=== Bus service ===
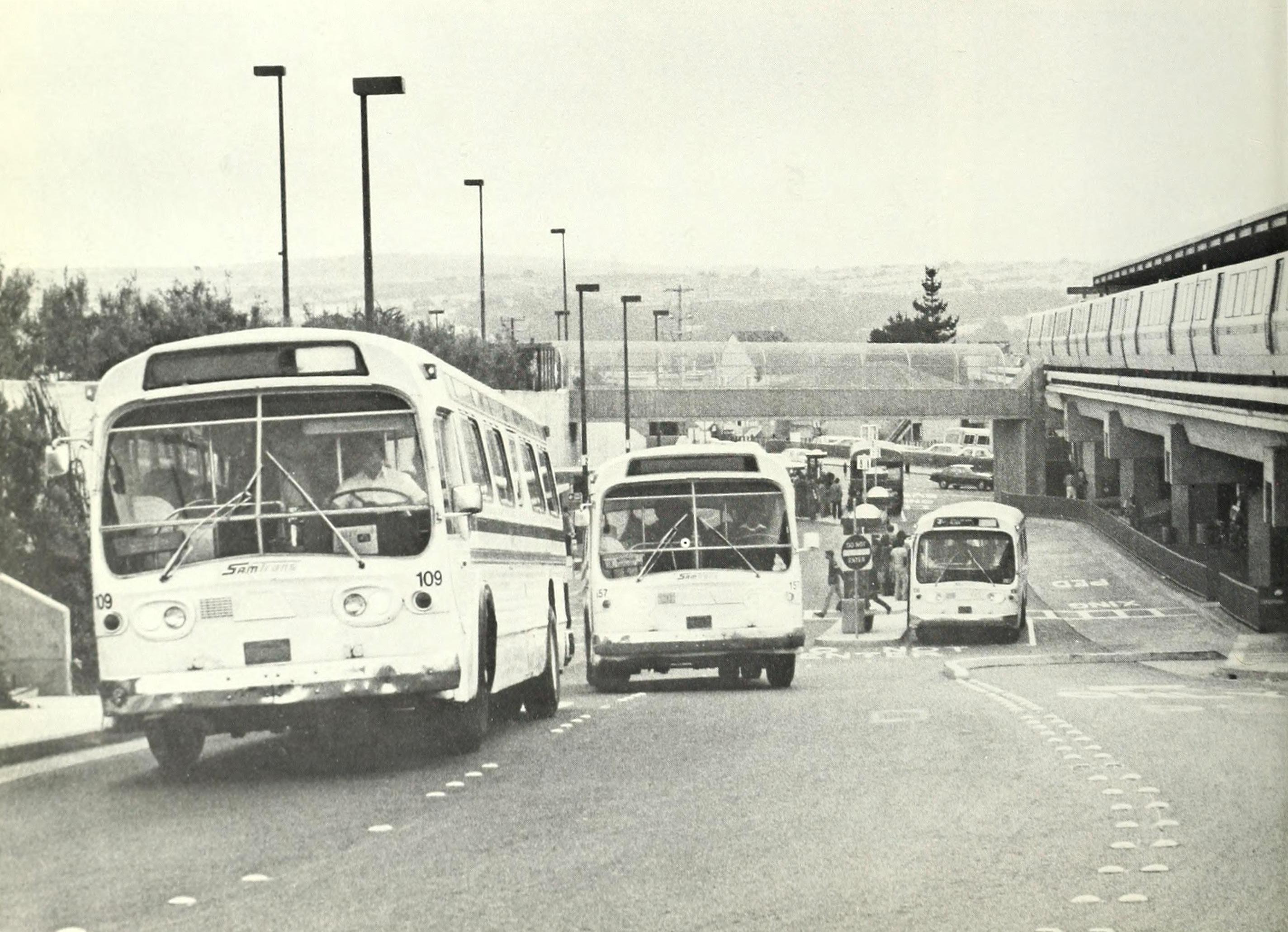
SamTrans buses at the station in 1977

Daly City station's position as the terminus of BART on the peninsula led to connecting bus service. The station was initially served by local bus routes operated by the privately owned Northgate Transit. Western Greyhound Lines, which operated commuter-oriented service from San Mateo County to downtown San Francisco, refused to add a Daly City station stop to its Pacifica-San Francisco route. Another private operator, ServiCar, operated two commuter routes between Peninsula points and the station from January 31 to February 27, 1974. Muni began serving Daly City with route 91 in April 1975; other routes were gradually added, including the 28 in 1982 and the 14L (now 14R) in 2012.

SamTrans was formed in 1976 as a publicly owned consolidation of most of the existing private bus systems in San Mateo County. SamTrans began operating a Daly City–San Bruno–San Francisco International Airport bus route in July 1976, though Northgate continued to operate the Daly City-area local routes until they were taken over by SamTrans in early 1977. SamTrans also took over Greyhound commuter routes on July 2, 1977. The Pacifica buses were cut back to Daly City station during times that BART operated, and several local routes serving the airport and the El Camino Real corridor were redirected to terminate at the station as well. Golden Gate Transit briefly operated a Daly City station–Golden Gate Bridge toll plaza connector route beginning in June 1981.

Construction of a canopy over the bus platform took place from September 1983 to April 1984. Further changes to the busway, including reversing the direction, took place in 1996–1997. A 2017–2018 project replaced the canopy with newer shelters and added a layover area for buses in the upper (east) parking lot.
