= List of SamTrans bus lines =

This is a list of bus routes operated by the San Mateo County Transit District (SamTrans) primarily in San Mateo County of the San Francisco Bay Area, in the state of California.

Notes:

- †: San Francisco stops restriction applies
  - Northbound (from San Mateo County): SamTrans cannot pick up northbound passengers at San Francisco stops
  - Southbound (to San Mateo County): Passengers boarding in San Francisco may not disembark in San Francisco
- NB – northbound, SB – southbound
- Sunday service is run during most holidays.

== Route numbering scheme ==
SamTrans route numbering scheme (Note: There are a number of routes using a lettered scheme that are special service along a certain area, to a certain place, or express services (denoted by X). These include routes CSM, ECR, EPX, FCX, PCX, and SKY.)
Transit connections		Areas served			Sequence number	
—	School-oriented routes	1	Coastside		0	Sequential number assigned to numbered routes
1	Serving North County and Coastside	2	North County	Colma / Daly City		
2	Serving South County	3	North County	Brisbane / South San Francisco		
3	Connects to BART and Caltrain	4	North County	San Bruno / Millbrae / Burlingame		
		5	Mid County	San Mateo / Foster City / Redwood Shores		
		6	Mid County	Belmont / San Carlos		
		7	Mid County	Redwood City		
		8	South County	Menlo Park / East Palo Alto / Palo Alto		
		9	Multi-city service			

== Express routes ==
SamTrans discontinued its last remaining express route, KX, by merging it into route 398 on August 5, 2018. Since then, the SamTrans board adopted the Express Bus Feasibility Study on December 5, 2018. The agency recommended launching six new express routes, starting with two pilot routes scheduled to begin in summer 2019. One route began service on schedule, but the other began service five years late. The first route, FCX, travels between San Francisco and Foster City along US 101. Route EPX provides service between San Bruno and East Palo Alto.

An early-morning weekday express route with limited trips, separate from the pilot program, was introduced on February 11, 2019. Route 713 provided replacement service for BART between 4:00 am and 5:00 am while seismic retrofit work was performed in the Transbay Tube. It currently runs between the Salesforce Transit Center and Millbrae Intermodal station via SFO Intl. Airport. This route was made a permanent addition.

The first new express route, designated FCX, started service on August 19, 2019. FCX operates two trips in each direction with headways of approximately 30 minutes during peak weekday commute hours, using recent buses that feature onboard Wi-Fi.

The next two express routes began in 2024, one serving between San Francisco/San Bruno and East Palo Alto (EPX). The other, PCX, serves Pacifica while serving stops at bus pads along the CA-1 freeway.

Route	Terminals		Areas Served	Notes	Links
713	Millbrae Millbrae Intermodal Station	San Francisco Salesforce Transit Center	Millbrae, San Bruno, San Francisco	Express service. No stops other than Millbrae Intermodal Station, SFO Intl. Airport, and Salesforce Transit Center.	Schedule and Route Map
FCX	Foster City; Hillsdale Blvd & Shell Blvd	San Francisco Salesforce Transit Center	Foster City EXpress. Foster City, San Mateo, San Francisco	Limited stops. Operates along Mission Street in San Francisco, serving the Financial District, Salesforce Transit Center and Ferry Building.	Schedule and Route Map (PDF)
EPX	East Palo Alto East Bayshore Rd & Donohoe St	San Bruno San Bruno BART Station	East Palo Alto EXpress. Redwood City, SFO Intl. Airport, San Bruno, San Francisco, East Palo Alto	Serves SFO Airtrain during all times of operation. Operates every 45 minutes until 6:56 pm Northbound & 6:10 pm Southbound in both directions. Operates four trips to Downtown San Francisco only during peak commute periods.	
EPX	East Palo Alto East Bayshore Rd & Donohoe St	San Francisco Salesforce Transit Center	East Palo Alto EXpress. Redwood City, SFO Intl. Airport, San Bruno, San Francisco, East Palo Alto	Serves SFO Airtrain during all times of operation. Operates every 45 minutes until 6:56 pm Northbound & 6:10 pm Southbound in both directions. Operates four trips to Downtown San Francisco only during peak commute periods.	
PCX	Pacifica; Linda Mar Park and Ride	Daly City; Daly City station	Pacifica Coastside EXpress. Pacifica, Daly City	Replacing route 118, this route serves limited stops between Linda Mar Park & Ride and Daly City station.	

== Local bus lines that serve North County ==
These bus lines are SamTrans lines that serve the northern and coastal parts of San Mateo County. These lines are identified with a "1" in the first digit of the three digit line number and designated as serving BART.

Route	Terminals		Areas Served	Notes	Links
110	Daly City; Daly City station	Pacifica; Linda Mar Park and Ride	Daly City, Pacifica		Schedule and Route Map (PDF)
112	Colma; Colma station	Pacifica; Clarendon Rd & Francisco Blvd	Colma, Pacifica		Schedule and Route Map (PDF)
117	Pacifica; Linda Mar Park and Ride	Half Moon Bay; Miramontes Pt Rd & Moonridge Apts	Pacifica, Montara, Moss Beach, El Granada, Half Moon Bay		Schedule and Route Map (PDF)
120	Daly City; Brunswick St & Templeton Av	Colma; Colma station	Daly City, Colma	First trip of the day from Daly City continues to San Francisco International Airport after stopping at Colma station.	Schedule and Route Map (PDF)
120	Daly City; Brunswick St & Templeton Av	San Francisco International Airport; Terminal A (First southbound trip only)	Daly City, Colma	First trip of the day from Daly City continues to San Francisco International Airport after stopping at Colma station.	Schedule and Route Map (PDF)
121	Daly City; Pope St & Bellevue Av	San Bruno; Skyline College	Daly City, Colma, Pacifica, San Bruno		Schedule and Route Map (PDF)
122	San Francisco; Stonestown	South San Francisco; South San Francisco station	San Francisco, Daly City, Colma, South San Francisco	Northbound route is designated as "122 - Stonestown/SF State," however, SF State University is served before the end of the line.	Schedule and Route Map (PDF)
130	Daly City; Daly City station	South San Francisco; Airport Blvd & Linden Av	San Bruno, South San Francisco		Schedule and Route Map (PDF)
130B	Daly City; Daly City station	South San Francisco; Oyster Point	San Bruno, South San Francisco		Schedule and Route Map (PDF)
138	San Bruno; Safe Harbor Shelter	South San Francisco; Airport Blvd & Linden Av	San Bruno, South San Francisco, Colma	Some runs originate from now-defunct route 38, or continue as either route 130 or route 141.	Schedule and Route Map (PDF)
138	San Bruno; Safe Harbor Shelter	Colma; Colma station	San Bruno, South San Francisco, Colma	Some runs originate from now-defunct route 38, or continue as either route 130 or route 141.	Schedule and Route Map (PDF)
141	San Bruno; Skyline College	South San Francisco; Airport Blvd & Linden Av	San Bruno, South San Francisco	Operates via San Bruno BART station	Schedule and Route Map (PDF)
142	San Bruno; Senior Center	San Francisco International Airport; Rental Car Center AirTrain station	San Bruno, South San Francisco	Operates via San Bruno BART station	Schedule and Route Map (PDF)

== Local bus lines that serve South County ==
These bus lines are SamTrans lines that the central and southern portions of San Mateo County. These lines are identified with a "2" in the first digit of the three digit line number and designated as serving Caltrain.

Route	Terminals		Areas Served	Notes	Links
250	San Mateo; College of San Mateo	San Mateo; San Mateo Dr & 2nd Ave	Hillsborough, San Mateo	Also serves San Mateo station.	Schedule and Route Map (PDF)
251	San Mateo; Hillsdale Shopping Center	Foster City; Hillsdale Blvd & Foster City Blvd	Hillsborough, San Mateo, Foster City	Operates as a counter-clockwise loop route in Foster City.	Schedule and Route Map (PDF)
260	San Carlos; San Carlos station	Belmont; Carlmont Village Shopping Center	Belmont, Redwood Shores, San Carlos	Also serves Belmont station.	Schedule and Route Map (PDF)
270	Redwood City; Redwood City station	Redwood City; Florence St & 17th Avenue	Redwood City, Atherton	Operates as a counter-clockwise loop route in Redwood City. No Sunday/holiday service.	Schedule and Route Map (PDF)
276	Redwood City; Redwood City station	Menlo Park; 4100 Bohannon Drive	Redwood City, Atherton, Menlo Park		Schedule and Route Map (PDF)
278	Redwood City; Redwood City station	Woodside; Cañada College	Redwood City, Woodside	Service west of Alameda de Las Pulgas & Woodside operates as a bidirectional loop. AM trips operate the clockwise loop. PM trips operate the counterclockwise loop.	Schedule and Route Map (PDF)
280	Palo Alto; Palo Alto station	East Palo Alto; Purdue Av & Fordham St	Palo Alto, East Palo Alto		Schedule and Route Map (PDF)
281	Menlo Park; Belle Haven Community Campus/Kelley Park	Stanford; Stanford Oval	Menlo Park, East Palo Alto, Palo Alto	Also serves Palo Alto station and Stanford Shopping Center.	Schedule and Route Map (PDF)
294	Half Moon Bay; Main St & Poplar St	San Mateo; Hillsdale station	Half Moon Bay, San Mateo		Schedule and Route Map (PDF)
295	San Mateo; Hillsdale station	Redwood City; Redwood City station	San Mateo, Belmont, San Carlos, Redwood City	Also serves San Carlos station.; One trip deviates to serve Cordilleras Mental Health Facility.; Served Menlo Park station until August 11, 2013.	Schedule and Route Map (PDF)
296	Redwood City; Redwood City station	East Palo Alto; East Bayshore Rd & Donohoe St	Redwood City, Menlo Park, East Palo Alto, Palo Alto	Also serves Menlo Park station.	Schedule and Route Map (PDF)
296O; All Nighter Service	Redwood City; Redwood City station	Palo Alto; Palo Alto station (Late nights only)	Redwood City, Menlo Park, East Palo Alto, Palo Alto	Service to Palo Alto station operates as an All Nighter filler service before and after Route 397 operations.	Schedule and Route Map (PDF)

== Local bus routes with multi-city connections ==
These SamTrans bus routes serve multiple areas in San Mateo County. These routes were at one time identified with a "3" in the first digit of the three-digit route number and designated as serving both BART and Caltrain, although the 397 is the only remaining route with the number "3" in the first digit. Route 292 is an exception.

Route	Terminals		Areas Served	Notes	Links
292†	San Francisco; Salesforce Transit Center	San Mateo; Hillsdale Shopping Center	San Francisco, Daly City, Brisbane, South San Francisco, San Bruno, San Francisco International Airport, Burlingame, San Mateo	Operates along Mission Street in San Francisco, serving Salesforce Transit Center, Financial District and Ferry Building.; Also serves San Francisco International Airport and Millbrae station.	Schedule and Route Map (PDF)
397†; All Nighter Service	San Francisco; Salesforce Transit Center	Palo Alto; Palo Alto station	San Francisco, Brisbane, South San Francisco, San Francisco International Airport, Millbrae, Burlingame, San Mateo, Belmont, San Carlos, Redwood City, Menlo Park, Palo Alto	Operates along Mission Street in San Francisco, serving Salesforce Transit Center, Financial District and Ferry Building.; Provides some connections to AC Transit Route 800.; Also serves San Francisco International Airport, Millbrae station, Hillsdale station, Belmont station, San Carlos station, Redwood City station and Menlo Park station.	Schedule and Route Map (PDF)
CSM	San Mateo; San Mateo Station	San Mateo; College of San Mateo	Daly City, South San Francisco, San Bruno	CSM is the abbreviation for College of San Mateo.	Schedule and Route Map (PDF)
ECR	Daly City BART Station	Palo Alto; Palo Alto Transit Center	Daly City, Colma, South San Francisco, San Bruno, Millbrae, Burlingame, San Mateo, Belmont, San Carlos, Redwood City, Atherton, Menlo Park, Palo Alto	Named after El Camino Real.; Replaced former routes 390 and 391.; ECRO provides service between 1 AM and 5 AM, skipping all BART stations.	Schedule and Route Map (PDF)
ECRO; All Nighter Service	Daly City Mission St & Wellington Ave (Late nights only)	San Francisco International Airport; Terminal A (Late nights only)	Daly City, Colma, South San Francisco, San Bruno, Millbrae, Burlingame, San Mateo, Belmont, San Carlos, Redwood City, Atherton, Menlo Park, Palo Alto	Named after El Camino Real.; Replaced former routes 390 and 391.; ECRO provides service between 1 AM and 5 AM, skipping all BART stations.	Schedule and Route Map (PDF)
SKY	Daly City; Daly City station	Daly City; Daly City station	Daly City, Serramonte Center, South San Francisco, San Bruno, Skyline College	SKY is named for Skyline College.	Schedule and Route Map (PDF)

== School-oriented local bus lines ==
These bus lines are community bus service that mainly serve schools. They have a limited number of runs, typically one in the morning and one in the afternoon. This may vary per route.

Route	Terminals		Areas Served	Notes	Links
10; School Days only	Daly City BART Station	Terra Nova High School; Pacifica (Afternoon)	Daly City, Pacifica	Follows Route 110 with no deviations.; Originally part of route 110.	
10; School Days only	Daly City BART Station	Linda Mar Park and Ride; Pacifica (Morning)	Daly City, Pacifica	Follows Route 110 with no deviations.; Originally part of route 110.	
12; School Days only	Gateway Drive and Hickey Boulevard; Pacifica	Clarendon Road and Francisco Boulevard; Pacifica	Daly City, Pacifica	Follows Route 112 with no deviations, terminating at Fairmount Shopping Center (Gateway Drive and Hickey Boulevard) instead of Colma BART.; Originally part of route 112.	
14; School Days only	Loop service to/from Terra Nova High School; Pacifica (Morning)		Pacifica	Clockwise loop service from/to Terra Nova High School in the morning.; Terra Nova High School clockwise to Crespi/Fassler in the afternoon.	
14; School Days only	Crespi Drive and Fassler Avenue; Pacifica (Afternoon)	Terra Nova High School; Pacifica (Afternoon)	Pacifica	Clockwise loop service from/to Terra Nova High School in the morning.; Terra Nova High School clockwise to Crespi/Fassler in the afternoon.	
15; School Days only	Moonridge Apartments; Half Moon Bay	Main and Kelly; Half Moon Bay	Half Moon Bay	Partially revived route 15 from 2004, used to serve Pescadero, San Gregorio, and Half Moon Bay.; 2023 version replaced two runs of route 18.	Schedule and Route Map; August 25, 2002
18; School Days only	Main Street and 7th Street; Montara	Cunha Intermediate School; Half Moon Bay	Montara, El Granada, Half Moon Bay		
19; School Days only	IB Lacy Middle School; Pacifica	Linda Mar Park and Ride Pacifica (Afternoon)	Pacifica	On morning runs, loops clockwise around Linda Mar via Crespi, Fassler, Terra Nova, Oddstad, Linda Mar, Rosita, and Peralta, then runs north via routes 110 and 112 to IBL Middle School.; On afternoon runs, goes south on CA-1 freeway to Linda Mar, loops clockwise around Linda Mar via Crespi, Fassler, Terra Nova, Oddstad, Linda Mar, Rosita, and Peralta, and terminates at Linda Mar Park and Ride.; All runs serve an extra two stops in Fairway Park, Pacifica. This segment used to be part of route 112.	
19; School Days only	IB Lacy Middle School; Pacifica	Highway 1 and Crespi Drive Pacifica (Morning)	Pacifica	On morning runs, loops clockwise around Linda Mar via Crespi, Fassler, Terra Nova, Oddstad, Linda Mar, Rosita, and Peralta, then runs north via routes 110 and 112 to IBL Middle School.; On afternoon runs, goes south on CA-1 freeway to Linda Mar, loops clockwise around Linda Mar via Crespi, Fassler, Terra Nova, Oddstad, Linda Mar, Rosita, and Peralta, and terminates at Linda Mar Park and Ride.; All runs serve an extra two stops in Fairway Park, Pacifica. This segment used to be part of route 112.	
24; School Days only	Old County Road and San Francisco Avenue; Brisbane	Westmoor Avenue and Baldwin Avenue; Daly City	Daly City, San Francisco, Brisbane		
25; School Days only	Los Olivos Avenue and San Diego Avenue; Daly City	Stewart Avenue and Maddux Drive; Daly City	Daly City		
28; School Days only	Serramonte Center; Daly City	Ponderosa Road and Southwood Center; South San Francisco	Daly City, South San Francisco		
29; School Days only	Templeton Avenue and Brunswick Street; Daly City	South Hill Drive, North Hill Drive, and Valley Drive; Brisbane	Daly City, Brisbane		
30; School Days only	Daly City BART Daly City	Orange Street and E. Market Street; Daly City (Afternoon)	Daly City, Colma, San Francisco	AM runs serve San Francisco, CA via San Jose Ave, Alemany Blvd, Sickles Ave, and Mission St.; PM runs do not enter San Francisco.	
30; School Days only	Daly City BART Daly City	Price Street and E. Market Street; Daly City (Morning)	Daly City, Colma, San Francisco	AM runs serve San Francisco, CA via San Jose Ave, Alemany Blvd, Sickles Ave, and Mission St.; PM runs do not enter San Francisco.	
35; School Days only	Del Monte Avenue and Romney Avenue; South San Francisco	Warwick Street and Christen Avenue; Daly City	Daly City, South San Francisco	Part was formerly now-defunct route 36.	Schedule and Route Map
37; School Days only	Romney Avenue and Del Monte Avenue; South San Francisco	Hillside Boulevard and Grove Avenue; South San Francisco	South San Francisco		Schedule and Route Map
40; School Days only	Ingrid B. Lacy Middle School; Pacifica	San Bruno BART Station	Daly City, Pacifica, Colma, San Bruno, South San Francisco	Starts at San Bruno BART Station in the morning, Ends at Oceana High School on run #1, IBL Middle School on run #2.; Begins at Oceana High School in the afternoon, serves IBL Middle school and ends at San Bruno BART. All runs serve Skyline College; Originally part of now-defunct route 140.	Schedule and Route Map (PDF)
40; School Days only	Oceana High School; Pacifica	San Bruno BART Station	Daly City, Pacifica, Colma, San Bruno, South San Francisco	Starts at San Bruno BART Station in the morning, Ends at Oceana High School on run #1, IBL Middle School on run #2.; Begins at Oceana High School in the afternoon, serves IBL Middle school and ends at San Bruno BART. All runs serve Skyline College; Originally part of now-defunct route 140.	Schedule and Route Map (PDF)
41; School Days only	Niles Avenue and Cedar Avenue (Parkside Intermediate School); San Bruno	San Bruno Herman St & Pacific Ave (Mornings only)	San Bruno, South San Francisco	Serves San Bruno BART, Belle Air School, and Parkside Intermediate School	Schedule and Route Map (PDF)
41; School Days only	Niles Avenue and Cedar Avenue (Parkside Intermediate School); San Bruno	San Bruno BART Station (Afternoons only)	San Bruno, South San Francisco	Serves San Bruno BART, Belle Air School, and Parkside Intermediate School	Schedule and Route Map (PDF)
42; School Days only	West Manor Drive and Palmetto Avenue; Pacifica	San Bruno BART Station	Daly City, Pacifica, Colma, San Bruno, South San Francisco	Nearly identical to route 40, instead not serving IBL Middle School nor Oceana High School, instead serving Parkside Intermediate School in San Bruno.; Originally part of now-defunct route 140. No relation to current route 142.	Schedule and Route Map (PDF)
46; School Days only	California Drive and Broadway; Burlingame (Morning)	Burlingame Intermediate School	Burlingame		
46; School Days only	Northpark Apartments Burlingame (Afternoon)	Burlingame Intermediate School	Burlingame		
49; School Days only	Pacifica Terra Nova Blvd & Everglades Dr	Brisbane Old County Rd & San Francisco Ave	Pacifica, Daly City, San Bruno, Brisbane	Serves Terra Nova High School	
51; School Days only	Shell Boulevard & East Hillsdale Boulevard; San Mateo	31st Avenue & Fernwood Street (Hillsdale High School); San Mateo	San Mateo		
53; School Days only	Peninsula Avenue and Humboldt Street; Burlingame	Edinburgh Street and Rhus Street (Borel Middle School); San Mateo	San Mateo, Burlingame		Schedule and Route Map (PDF)
53P; School Days only	Peninsula Avenue and Humboldt Street; Burlingame	Edinburgh Street and Rhus Street (Borel Middle School); San Mateo	San Mateo, Burlingame	53P runs via Poplar Avenue	Schedule and Route Map (PDF)
54; School Days only	AM service from Hillsdale Boulevard and Norfolk Street to Bowditch School, PM service in reverse direction Foster City		Foster City		Schedule and Route Map (PDF)
55; School Days only	Poplar Avenue and El Camino Real; San Mateo	Edinburgh Street and Barneson Avenue (Borel Middle School); San Mateo	San Mateo		Schedule and Route Map (PDF)
57; School Days only	31st Avenue and Fernwood Street (Hillsdale High School); San Mateo	Port Royal Avenue and Cumberland Court; Foster City	San Mateo, Foster City		Schedule and Route Map (PDF)
58; School Days only	Borel Avenue and Edinburgh Street (Borel Middle School); San Mateo	Polhemus Road and Tower Road; San Mateo	San Mateo		Schedule and Route Map (PDF)
59; School Days only	Alameda de las Pulgas and Castillan Way (Aragon High School); San Mateo	Hillsdale Boulevard and Norfolk Street; San Mateo	San Mateo		Schedule and Route Map (PDF)
60; School Days only	Ralston Avenue and Tahoe Drive; Belmont	Bridge Parkway and Bowsprit Drive; Redwood Shores	Belmont, Redwood Shores	Trips go through Chula Vista to serve Carlmont High School.	Schedule and Route Map (PDF)
61; School Days only	Ralston Avenue and Alameda de las Pulgas; Belmont	San Carlos Caltrain Station; San Carlos	Belmont, San Carlos		Schedule and Route Map (PDF)
62; School Days only	Old County Road and Dale View Avenue; Belmont	Alameda de las Pulgas and Ralston Avenue; Belmont	Belmont	2 westbound afternoon trips start from Hillsdale Boulevard/31st Avenue in San Mateo.	Schedule and Route Map (PDF)
67; School Days only	Ralston Avenue and Tahoe Drive (Ralston Middle School); Belmont	Bridge Parkway and Bowsprit Drive; Redwood Shores	Belmont, Redwood Shores		Schedule and Route Map (PDF)
68; School Days only	Ralston Avenue and Tahoe Drive (Ralston Middle School); Belmont	Hiller Street and Wessex Way; Belmont	Belmont		Schedules and Route Map (PDF)
72; School Days only	Northumberland Avenue and Marlborough Avenue; Redwood City	Selby Lane and Serrano Drive; Atherton	Redwood City, Atherton		Schedules and Route Map (PDF)
73; School Days only	Clifford Avenue and Victoria Manor; San Carlos	G Street and Industrial Road; Redwood City	Redwood City, San Carlos		Schedules and Route Map (PDF)
79; School Days only	Connecticut Drive and Washington Avenue; Redwood City	Florence Street and 17th Avenue; Menlo Park	Redwood City, Menlo Park		Schedules and Route Map (PDF)
80; School Days only	Santa Cruz Avenue and Elder Avenue; Menlo Park	Oak Avenue and Oak Knoll Lane; Menlo Park	Menlo Park		Schedules and Route Map (PDF)
82; School Days only	Bay Road and Marsh Road; Menlo Park	Santa Cruz Avenue and Elder Avenue; Menlo Park	Menlo Park, Atherton, Redwood City		Schedules and Route Map (PDF)
83; School Days only	Santa Cruz Avenue and Elder Avenue; Menlo Park	Bay Road and Marsh Road; Menlo Park	Menlo Park, Atherton, Redwood City, Palo Alto		Schedules and Route Map (PDF)
84; School Days only	Encinal Avenue and Middlefield Road; Menlo Park	Santa Cruz Avenue and Elder Avenue; Menlo Park	Menlo Park, Atherton, Redwood City		Schedules and Route Map (PDF)
85; School Days only	Corta Madera School; Portola Valley	Skyline Boulevard and La Honda Road; Woodside	Woodside, Portola Valley, Palo Alto, Menlo Park, Atherton, Redwood City	Afternoon service only.	Schedules and Route Map (PDF)
87; School Days only	Alameda de las Pulgas and Hull Avenue; Woodside	Portola Road and Family Farm Road; Portola Valley	Woodside, Portola Valley		Schedules and Route Map (PDF)
88; School Days only	Bay Road and Christopher Street; Atherton	Encinal School; Menlo Park	Menlo Park, Atherton		Schedules and Route Map (PDF)

== Former bus lines ==
Route	Terminals		Areas Served	Notes	Links
11; School Days only	Southgate Avenue and Lakeshire Drive; Daly City	Hickey Boulevard and Gateway Drive; Daly City	Daly City		
16; School Days only	Terra Nova High School; Pacifica	Serramonte Shopping Center; Daly City	Pacifica, Daly City	Merged with route 49 in 2021.	Schedule and Route Map (PDF)
36; School Days only	Evergreen Drive and Mission Road; South San Francisco	Callan Boulevard and Wembley Drive; Daly City	Daly City, South San Francisco	Replaced by realigned route 35 on August 21, 2013.	Schedule and Route Map; January 13, 2013
39; School Days only	Romney Avenue and Del Monte Avenue; South San Francisco	Hazelwood Drive and Kenwood Way; South San Francisco	South San Francisco	Merged with route 37 on August 7, 2022.	Schedule and Route Map
86; School Days only	Ringwood Avenue and Arlington Way; Menlo Park	Indian Crossing and Horseshoe Bend; Portola Valley	Menlo Park, Portola Valley	Merged with route 286 on January 21, 2018.	Schedule and Route Map; August 11, 2017
118; Weekdays Only	Pacifica; Linda Mar Park and Ride	Daly City; Daly City station	Pacifica, Daly City	Suspended due to COVID-19, replaced by PCX on August 5, 2024.	
123; Weekdays Only	Colma BART Station	Skyline College; San Bruno	Daly City, Colma, San Bruno	Discontinued January 26, 2014.	Schedule and Route Map; August 15, 2010
131	Serramonte Shopping Center	Airport Boulevard and Linden Avenue; South San Francisco	Daly City, South San Francisco	Merged with route 130 on January 21, 2018.	Schedule and Route Map; August 6, 2017
132; No Sunday service	Loop services to/from South San Francisco BART Station		South San Francisco	Operated as both a clockwise and counter-clockwise loop route around South San Francisco; discontinued January 26, 2014.	Schedule and Route Map; December 18, 2011
133	San Bruno BART	Airport Boulevard and Linden AvenueSouth San Francisco	South San Francisco, San Bruno	Merged with route 141 on January 21, 2018.	Schedule and Route Map August 6, 2017
140	West Manor Drive and Palmetto Avenue; Pacifica	SFO Rental Car AirTrain Station	Pacifica, Daly City, San Bruno	Operated via San Bruno BART and San Bruno Caltrain stations; discontinued August 7, 2022.	Schedule and Route Map (PDF) January 26, 2014
261; Saturdays only	Continentals Way and Lyall Way; Belmont	San Carlos Caltrain station	Belmont, Redwood Shores, San Carlos	Merged with route 260 on January 21, 2018.	Schedule and Route Map; January 10, 2016
262; Weekdays only	Hillsdale Shopping Center; San Mateo	Alameda de Las Pulgas and Ralston Avenue; Belmont	Belmont, San Mateo	Discontinued January 26, 2014.	Schedule and Route Map (PDF); August 11, 2013
271; Weekdays only	Redwood City Caltrain Station	Virginia Avenue and Massachusetts Avenue; Woodside Plaza (Redwood City); Florence St & 17 Avenue (Redwood City)	Redwood City, Atherton	Discontinued January 26, 2014.	Schedule and Route Map (PDF); August 11, 2013
273; Weekdays only	Redwood City Caltrain Station	Cordilleras Center; Redwood City	Redwood City	Merged with route 295 on January 21, 2018.	Schedule and Route Map; January 10, 2016
297; All Nighter Service	Palo Alto Caltrain Station	Redwood City Caltrain Station	Redwood City, Menlo Park, East Palo Alto, Palo Alto	Merged with route 296 on January 21, 2018.: Operated as a filler service route before and after route 397 operations.	Schedule and Route Map; January 10, 2016
342; Weekdays only	Loop service to/from Millbrae BART/Caltrain Station		Millbrae, Burlingame	Discontinued December 20, 2009, due to high budget constraints and low ridership.	Schedule and Route Map (PDF) February 1, 2009
359; Weekday peak periods only	Millbrae BART/Caltrain Station	Hillsdale Boulevard and Norfolk Street; Foster City	Millbrae, San Mateo, Foster City	Discontinued January 26, 2014.	Schedule and Route Map; April 10, 2011
390; Weekdays only	Daly City BART Station	Palo Alto Caltrain Station	Daly City, Colma, South San Francisco, San Bruno, Millbrae, Burlingame, San Mateo, Belmont, San Carlos, Redwood City, Atherton, Menlo Park, Palo Alto	Replaced by route ECR on August 11, 2013.	Schedule and Route Map; August 26, 2012
391; Weekdays only†	Mission Street and Evergreen Avenue; Daly City	Redwood City Caltrain Station	San Francisco, Daly City, Colma, South San Francisco, San Bruno, Millbrae, Burlingame, San Mateo, Belmont, San Carlos, Redwood City	Also operated via Mission Street, Cesar Chavez Street, and South Van Ness Avenue in San Francisco.; Peak-hour terminal was located at the northeast corner of Main & Folsom.; Replaced by route ECR on August 11, 2013.	Schedule and Route Map; September 23, 2012
398†	San Francisco; Drumm St & Clay St	Redwood City; Redwood City station	San Francisco, San Bruno, Millbrae, San Mateo, Belmont, San Carlos, Redwood City	Operated along Mission Street in San Francisco, used to serve Salesforce Transit Center, Financial District and Ferry Building.; Used to serve San Bruno BART station, San Francisco International Airport, Hillsdale station, Belmont station, San Carlos station and Redwood City station.; Discontinued February 9, 2024 and replaced by route EPX, and also by added trips for routes ECR and 292.	Schedule and Route Map (PDF)
399; Late night service between 1 and 5 am	Mission Street and Wellington Avenue; Daly City	Courtyard A San Francisco International Airport	Daly City, South San Francisco, San Bruno, San Francisco International Airport	Loop route service originated and terminated in Daly City. Passengers could ride around the San Francisco International Airport through Courtyard A.; Provided limited service to Daly City BART and also connected some services to MUNI Route 14 at Mission Street & Wellington Avenue.; Discontinued on June 24, 2018, due to low ridership.	Schedule and Route Map; August 6, 2017
ECR Rapid	Daly City BART Station	Redwood City Transit Center	Daly City, Colma, South San Francisco, San Bruno, Millbrae, Burlingame, San Mateo, Belmont, San Carlos, Redwood City	Complemented the ECR service with limited stops terminating at Redwood City Caltrain Station speeding up travel time by up to 40 minutes.; Discontinued on January 19, 2020, due to a shortage of bus operators.	Schedule and Route Map June 23, 2019
BX	Loop service to/from Colma BART Station		Colma	Loop route serving San Francisco International Airport. Discontinued in 2003.	Schedule and Route Map; November 17, 2002
CX	Colma BART Station	Highway 1 and Linda Mar Boulevard; Linda Mar Park and Ride (Pacifica)	Colma, Pacifica	Renamed route 118 on December 20, 2009, due to high budget constraints.	Schedule and Route Map (PDF); February 1, 2009
DX	Spear Street and Market Street; Downtown San Francisco	Highway 1 and Linda Mar Boulevard; Linda Mar Park and Ride (Pacifica)	San Francisco, Pacifica	Discontinued December 20, 2009, due to high budget constraints.	Schedule and Route Map (PDF); February 1, 2009
FX	Beale Street and Market Street; Downtown San Francisco	Hillsdale Boulevard and Norfolk Street; Foster City	San Francisco, San Mateo, Foster City	This line operated within the Financial District in San Francisco; discontinued December 20, 2009, due to high budget constraints.	Schedule and Route Map (PDF); December 21, 2008
KX	Main Street and Folsom Street; Transbay Terminal	Redwood City Caltrain Station	San Francisco, San Francisco International Airport, Belmont, San Carlos, Redwood City	Operated as an express service route (via Highway 101 and 9th/10th Streets) between San Francisco International Airport and downtown San Francisco.; Passengers with luggage were prohibited from traveling on the express portion of the route until 2013 due to a lawsuit filed in the 1970s by a private shuttle service called San Francisco Airporter, which contended that SamTrans' public subsidy gave it an unfair competitive advantage. Although San Francisco Airporter was sold in 2001 and ceased airport service in 2006, the luggage ban continued until June 1, 2013, when SamTrans was cleared to do so by the Federal Transit Administration.; San Francisco Terminal service was located at the southwest corner of Main Street and Folsom Street, just outside the Temporary Transbay Terminal. Pick-ups were on Main Street; drop-offs were on Folsom Street.; Served Palo Alto station and Stanford Shopping Center until August 11, 2013.; Merged into route 398 on August 5, 2018.	Schedule and Route Map (PDF); March 19, 2017
MX	Mission Street and 1st Street; Transbay Terminal	El Camino Real and East 4th Avenue; Downtown San Mateo	San Francisco, San Bruno, Millbrae, Burlingame, Hillsborough, San Mateo	This line operated within San Francisco Civic Center en route to and from the Transbay Terminal. Discontinued December 20, 2009, due to high budget constraints.	Schedule and Route Map (PDF) May 11, 2009
NX	Mission Street and 1st Street; Transbay Terminal	Bridge Parkway and Redwood Shores Parkway; Redwood Shores	San Francisco, San Mateo, Redwood Shores	Discontinued December 20, 2009, due to high budget constraints.	Schedule and Route Map; February 1, 2009
PX	Spear Street and Market Street; Downtown San Francisco	5th Avenue and El Camino Real; Redwood City	San Francisco, San Mateo, Belmont, San Carlos, Redwood City	Discontinued December 20, 2009, due to high budget constraints.	Schedule and Route Map (PDF); February 1, 2009
RX	Spear Street and Market Street; Downtown San Francisco	Stanford Shopping Center	San Francisco, Redwood City, Atherton, Menlo Park, Palo Alto	Discontinued December 20, 2009, due to high budget constraints.	Schedule and Route Map (PDF); February 1, 2009
REX	East Bayshore & Cooley; East Palo Alto	Millbrae Intermodal Station	East Palo Alto, Menlo Park, Redwood City, Redwood Shores, San Mateo, Burlingame, Millbrae	Regional EXpress using special Gillig Phantom buses were equipped with reclining seats, footrests, reading lights, and luggage racks. Service started August 23, 2004 and was discontinued by mid 2008.	Schedule and Route Map (PDF); April 16, 2006
SFO	SFO Airport	Millbrae Station; Millbrae	Millbrae	Operates loop service to/from Millbrae Station Merged with route 292 on August 7, 2022.	[pagelink Schedule and Route Map (PDF)]
