= San Bruno station (BART) =

Rapid transit station in San Francisco Bay Area

San Bruno
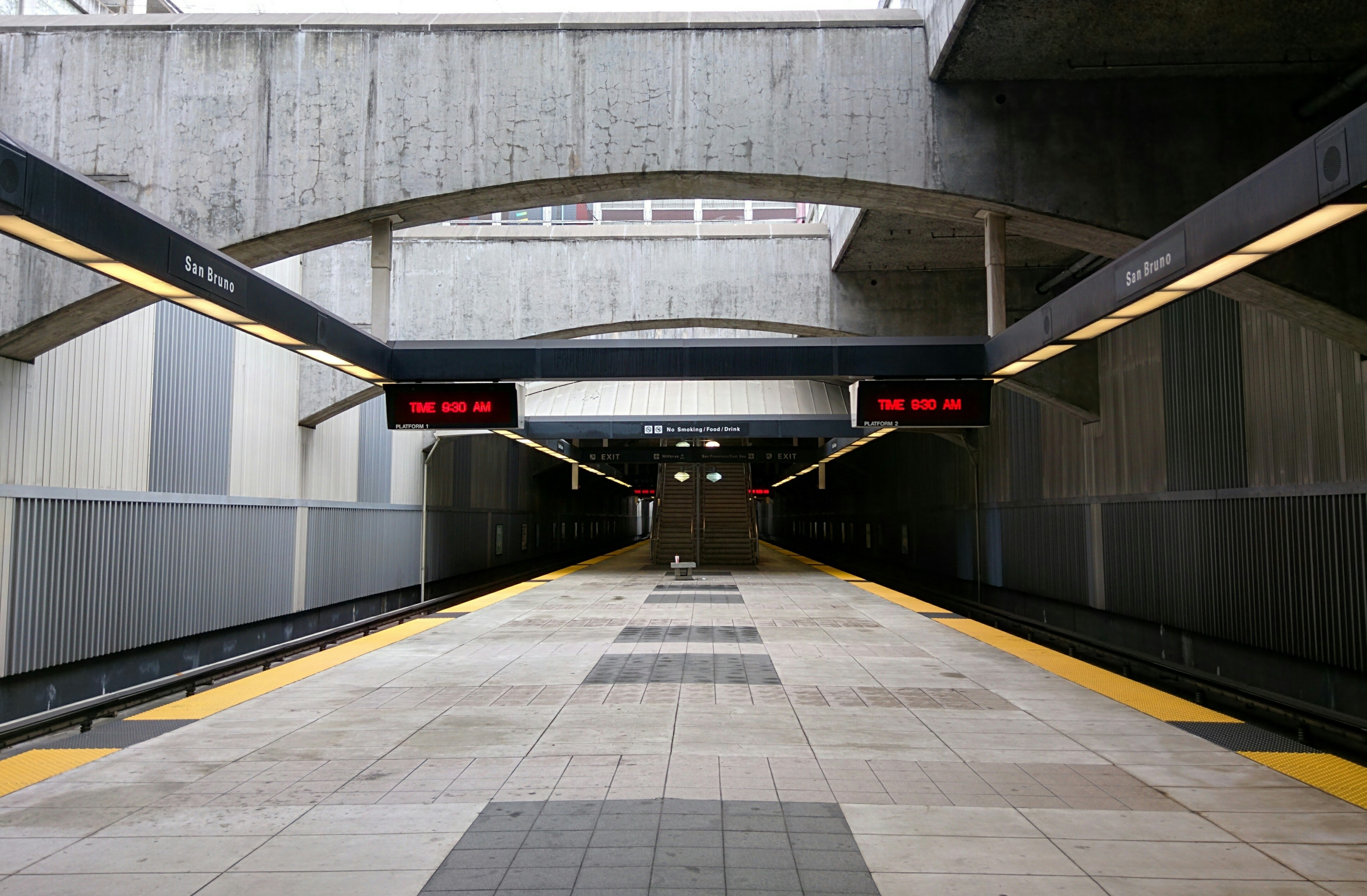
- San Bruno station platform in August 2015

General information
- Location: 1151 Huntington Avenue; San Bruno, California
- Coordinates: 37°38′18″N 122°24′59″W
- Owner: San Francisco Bay Area Rapid Transit District
- Line: BART W-Line
- Platforms: 1 island platform
- Tracks: 2
- Connections: Bayhill San Bruno BART Shuttle; SamTrans: ECR, 40, 41, 42, 141, 142, EPX

Construction
- Structure type: Open cut
- Parking: 1,083 spaces
- Cycle facilities: 30 lockers
- Accessible: Yes

Other information
- Station code: BART: SBRN

History
- Opened: June 22, 2003

Passengers
- 2025: 1,664 (weekday average)

Services
Preceding station	Bay Area Rapid Transit	Following station
SFO toward Millbrae	Red Line	South San Francisco toward Richmond
SFO Terminus	Yellow Line	South San Francisco toward Antioch via Pittsburg/Bay Point
SFO after 9pm toward Millbrae	Yellow Line	South San Francisco toward Antioch via Pittsburg/Bay Point
Former services
Preceding station	Bay Area Rapid Transit	Following station
Millbrae Terminus	Dublin/Pleasanton–Millbrae line 2008–2009	South San Francisco toward Dublin/Pleasanton
San Francisco International Airport toward Millbrae	Dublin/Pleasanton–SFO/Millbrae line 2005–2008	South San Francisco toward Dublin/Pleasanton
San Francisco International Airport toward SFO	Dublin/Pleasanton–SFO line 2003–2004	South San Francisco toward Dublin/Pleasanton
Location

San Bruno station is a Bay Area Rapid Transit (BART) station located adjacent to the Tanforan shopping center in San Bruno, California. It consists of two main tracks and a shared underground island platform. Service at the station began on June 22, 2003 as part of the BART San Mateo County Extension project that extended BART service southward from Colma to Millbrae and San Francisco International Airport. The station is served by the Red and Yellow lines.

== History ==
The land for the station was acquired from the neighboring shopping center through eminent domain proceedings that started in 1999; after the two-year lawsuit, BART paid $34 million as a settlement in 2001 to the four corporations who jointly owned the mall property. The City of San Bruno requested the new station be named Tanforan Park after the racetrack and later mall that occupied the site, but BART officials, sensitive to the past history of Tanforan as an Assembly Center for Japanese-American citizens during World War II and the recent lawsuit, declined the request in 2002.

During daytime hours on weekdays starting in 2008 the station served as a cross-platform transfer station for passengers traveling between Millbrae station to the south and San Francisco International Airport station to the east. A direct service was partially restored the following year, with the transfer rendered unnecessary at all times effective February 11, 2019, though it appeared as a transfer station on BART maps until 2021.

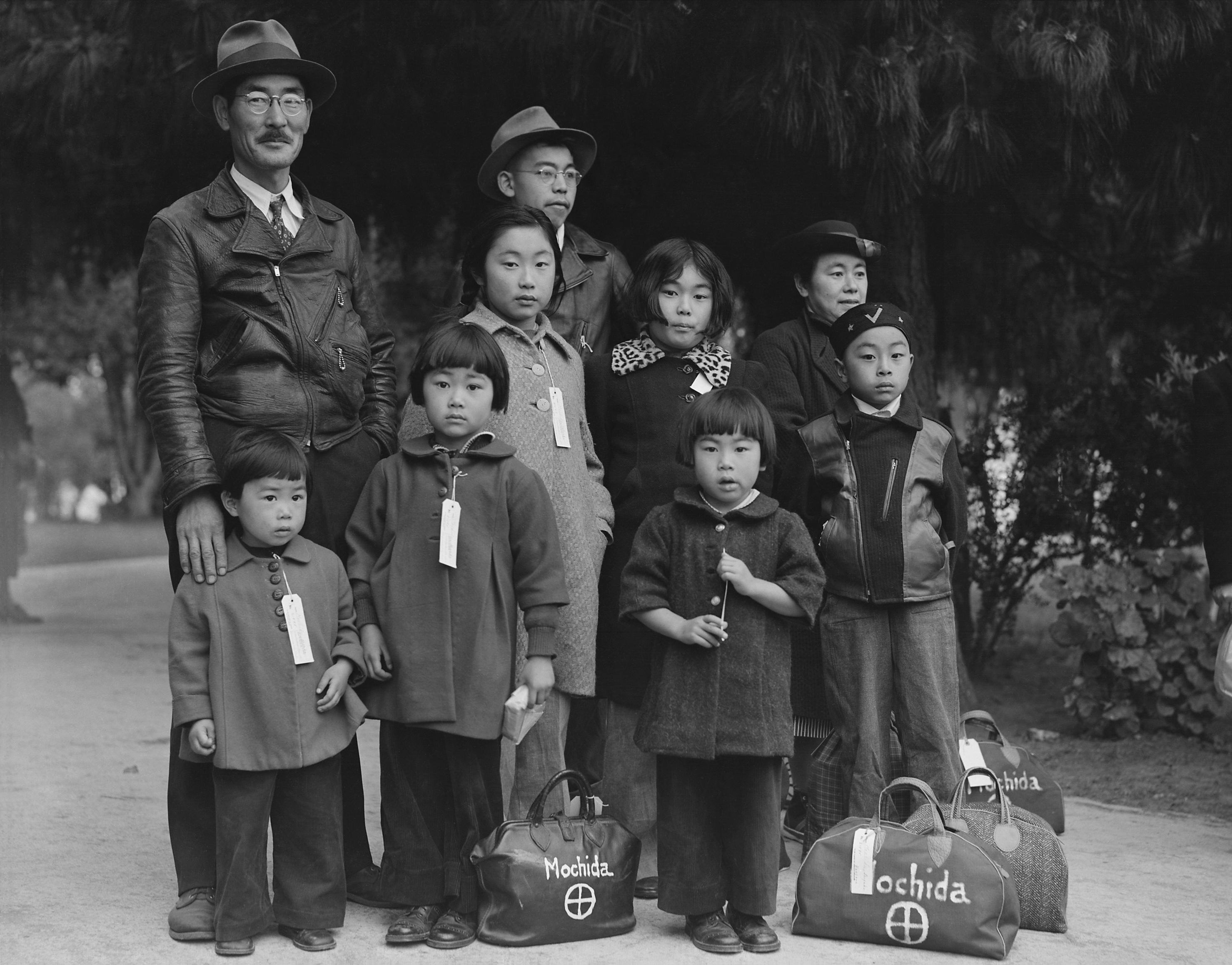
Dorothea Lange's photo of the Mochida family (May 1942); Hiroko and Miyuki are in the front row, at left. Miyuki is holding a sandwich.

The Tanforan Assembly Center Memorial Committee (TACMC) has raised funds and begun construction of the Tanforan Memorial at the San Bruno BART station. TACMC was formed in March 2012 to commemorate the 70th anniversary of the Tanforan Assembly Center by staging an exhibition of photographs by Dorothea Lange and Paul Kitagaki Jr. covering the Internment of Japanese Americans following the issuance of Executive Order 9066. The Tanforan Assembly Center was named after the racetrack where more than 8,000 Japanese-Americans, primarily from the San Francisco Bay Area, were temporarily detained before being sent to more permanent War Relocation Centers; the station now stands where the racetrack was. When complete, the new memorial will include a bronze statue depicting Hiroko and Miyuki Mochida of Hayward, inspired by one of Lange's photographs from 1942. A groundbreaking ceremony for the new memorial was held on February 11, 2022. Within the station, photographs from Lange and Kitagaki will remain on permanent display.

San Bruno is one of ten stations, five of them on the Yellow Line, that BART foresees closing as early as January 2027 if a sales tax measure to bail out Bay Area transit agencies fails to pass in November 2026.

== Bus connections ==
SamTrans bus routes 140, 141, 398, and ECR stop at bus bays on the ground level of the parking garage north of the station.
