= Colma station =

Rapid transit station in Colma, California, US

Colma
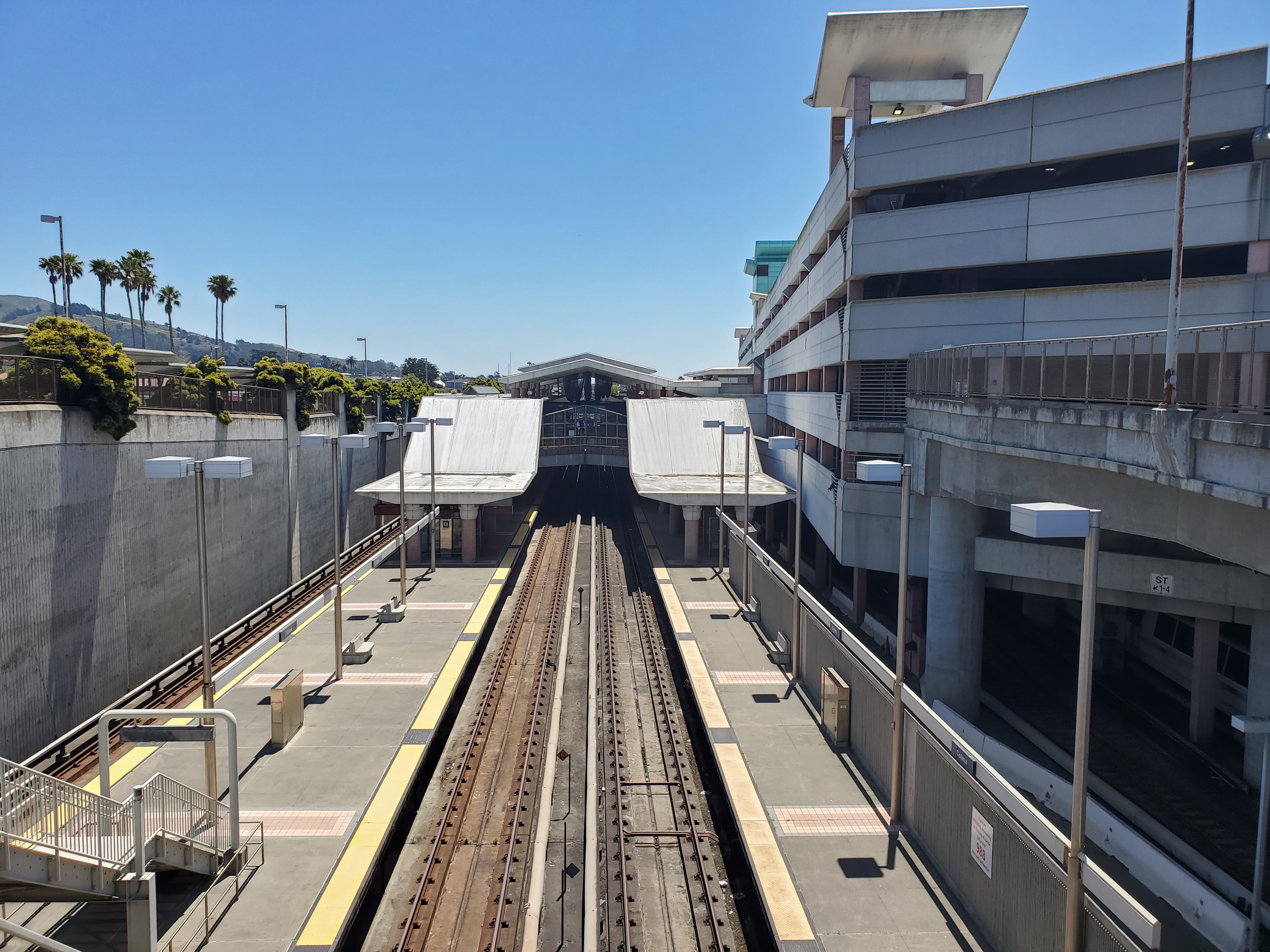
- Colma station in July 2023

General information
- Location: 365 D Street; Colma, California
- Coordinates: 37°41′05″N 122°27′58″W
- Line: BART W-Line
- Platforms: 1 side platform, 1 island platform
- Tracks: 3
- Connections: SamTrans: ECR, 112, 120, 122, 130, 138; Crown Colony Shuttle

Construction
- Structure type: Open cut
- Parking: 2,238 spaces
- Cycle facilities: 24 lockers
- Accessible: Yes

Other information
- Station code: BART: COLM

History
- Opened: October 23, 1863 (former station); February 24, 1996
- Closed: November 1928 (former station)

Passengers
- 2026: 1,940 (weekday average)

Services
Preceding station	Bay Area Rapid Transit	Following station
South San Francisco toward Millbrae	Red Line	Daly City toward Richmond
South San Francisco toward SFO or Millbrae	Yellow Line	Daly City toward Antioch via Pittsburg/Bay Point
Former services
Preceding station	Bay Area Rapid Transit	Following station
South San Francisco toward Millbrae	Dublin/Pleasanton–Millbrae line 2008–2009	Daly City toward Dublin/Pleasanton
South San Francisco toward Millbrae	Dublin/Pleasanton–SFO/Millbrae line 2005–2008	Daly City toward Dublin/Pleasanton
South San Francisco toward SFO	Dublin/Pleasanton–SFO line 2003–2004	Daly City toward Dublin/Pleasanton
Preceding station	Southern Pacific Railroad	Following station
Ocean View toward San Francisco	Coast Line	Sholim toward Los Angeles
Ocean View toward San Francisco	Peninsula Commute	Baden toward San Jose
Location

Colma station is a Bay Area Rapid Transit (BART) station located in unincorporated northern San Mateo County, California adjacent to the incorporated town of Colma and city of Daly City. The station is served by the Red and Yellow lines. Colma station is situated in a small valley shared with BART's Daly City Yard and a large parking garage. The station has three tracks, with an island platform between the two eastern tracks and a side platform next to the western track. Only the two eastern tracks are used for revenue service.

A former station, near the same site, was served by the Southern Pacific Railroad Ocean View Branch from 1863 to 1928. It was relocated and restored as a museum in the early 2000s. The BART yard was constructed in 1984–1988, and the station was added in 1996.

== History ==
=== Southern Pacific station ===
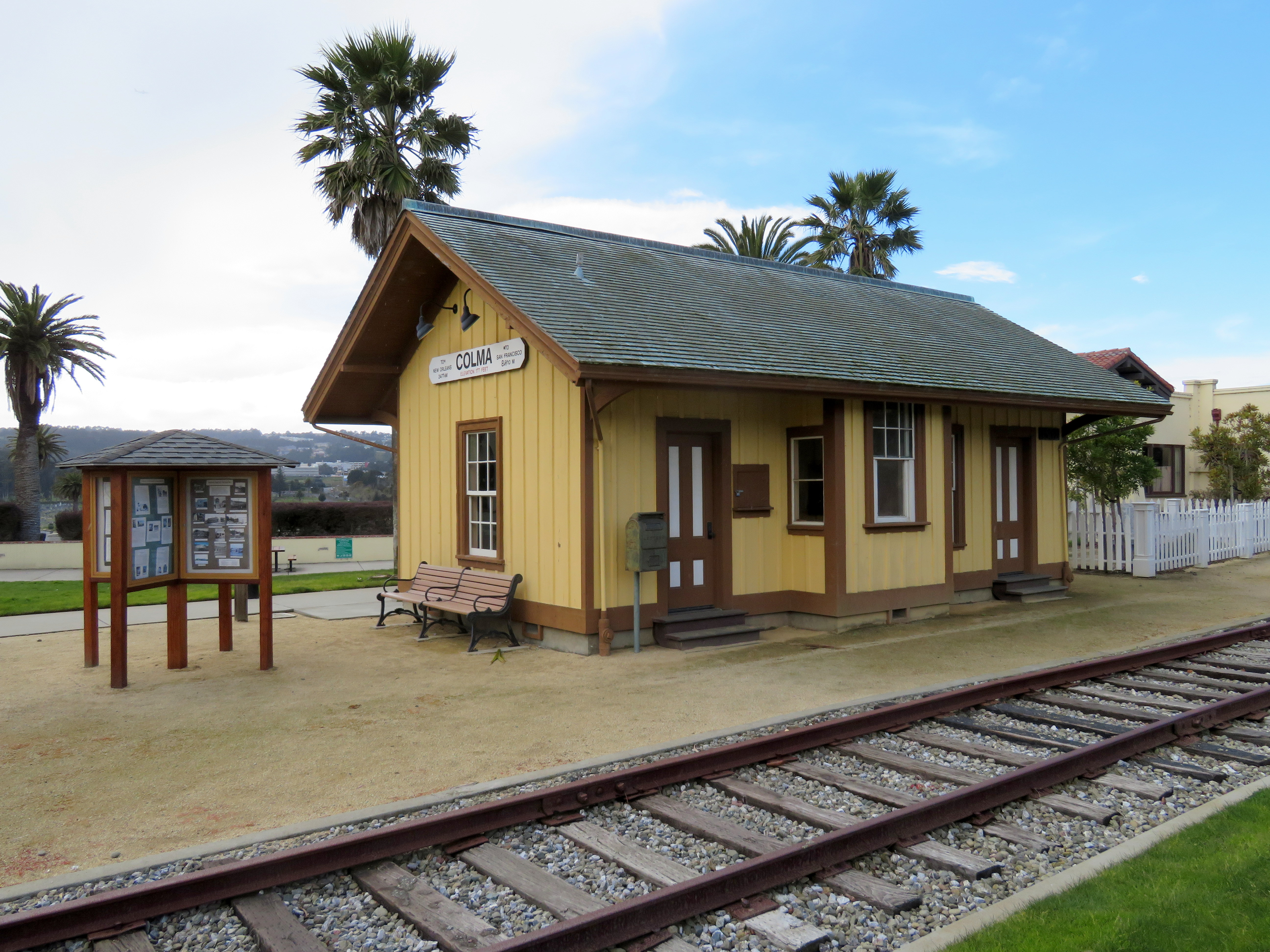
The preserved former station building in 2018

The San Francisco and San Jose Railroad opened south from San Francisco to San Francisquito Creek on October 23, 1863. The first stop outside of the city was named School House after a nearby schoolhouse near the intersection of Mission Street and Old San Pedro Road. A station building was constructed in 1863 or soon after. (Note: Twentieth-century sources indicated that the station was built in 1881. However, new evidence found in 2006 indicated it was built around 1863.) In March 1868, the railroad was acquired by the Southern Pacific; it became part of the Coast Line and served Peninsula Commute service. The name of the station and the surrounding village was changed to "Colma" in the 1870s.

Originally located north of Washington Street, the station was moved slightly to the south around 1913. The 1907 opening of the Bayshore Cutoff significantly reduced passenger demand along the original line between San Francisco and San Bruno, which became the Ocean View Branch. SP passenger service on the Ocean View Branch was limited to a few daily locals after 1907, and just one daily round trip after June 1919. The SP was allowed to temporarily discontinue passenger service on the branch in November 1928 during a construction project. This became permanent in March 1930. Freight service was cut back in portions; the segment through Colma remained in use until 1978.

In 1981, the former station building was deemed a historic resource that would be affected by the BART yard project. It was moved across San Pedro Road in 1983 and moved back in 1989. It was moved again to El Camino Real and Serramonte Boulevard in 1993 to make room for the station project. BART transferred possession of the building to the Colma Historical Association in October 1996. The former station and freight house buildings were moved to 1500 Hillside Boulevard in April 2003. They were restored as museum buildings for the Colma Community Center, which opened on November 21, 2004.

=== BART station ===
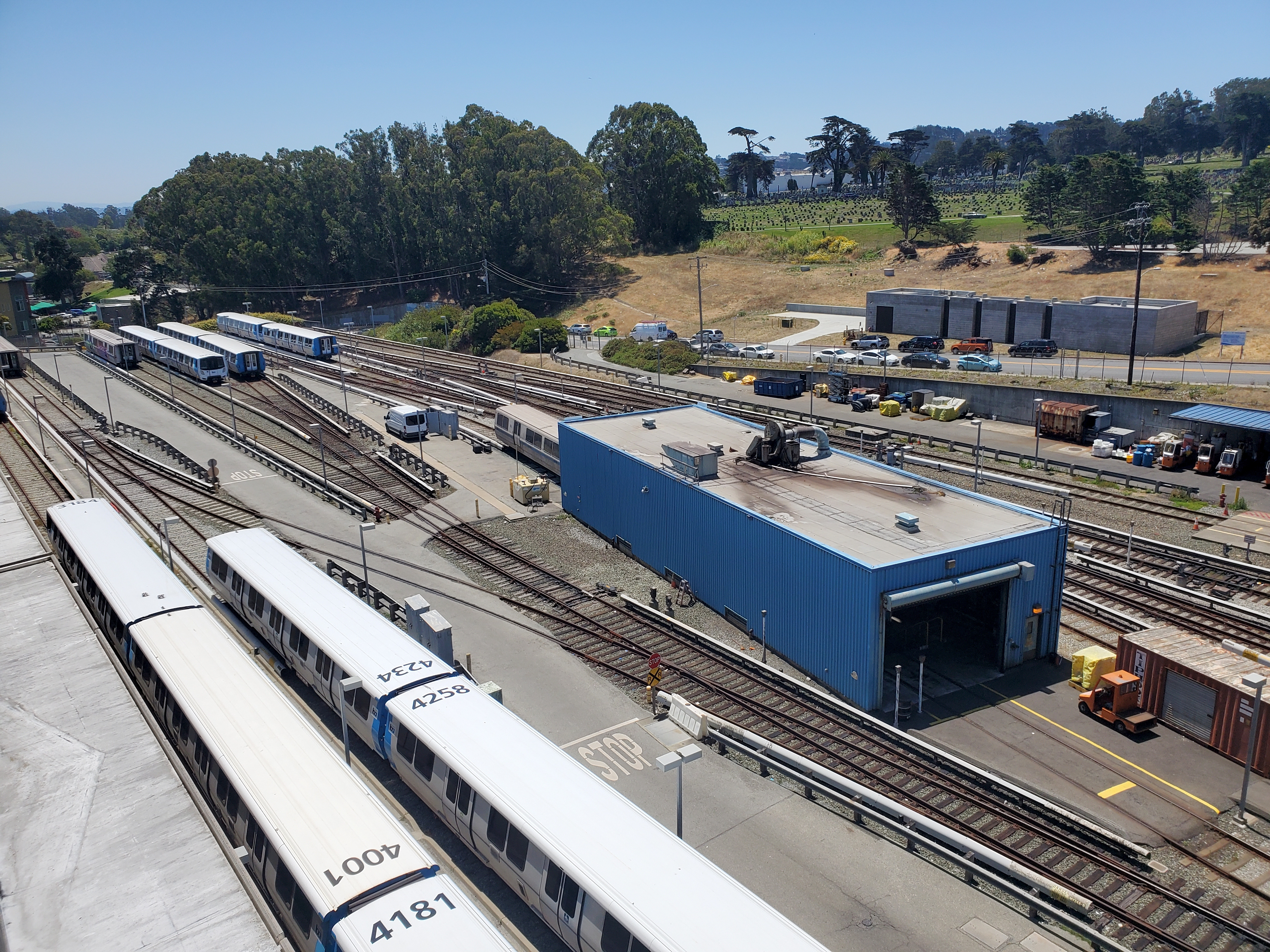
Daly City Yard in 2023

The Ocean View Branch right of way was reused to construct the Daly City Turnback and Yard in 1984–1988. The turnback added tail tracks and crossovers to allow more trains to reverse direction at Daly City station, while the yard added storage tracks and a maintenance facility. San Mateo County voters approved plans for a Colma station in 1986 and 1988. BART began negotiations with the county and its transit district about a potential Colma station in 1987. It was to serve as the first stage of the extension to San Francisco International Airport. The district paid BART $10 million in December 1989 as the initial payment on the extension. A $50 million Federal Transit Administration grant for the project was awarded in December 1991, followed by a $70 million grant in May 1992. Initial construction began in May 1992.

A $36.8 million construction contract for the station was awarded on February 11, 1993, followed by a $32.4 million contract for the garage on April 15, 1993. Underground tail tracks south of the station were completed on November 5, 1993. The full project cost $170 million: $128 million in federal funds, $21 million in state funds, and $21 million from SamTrans. The station included a five-level, 1,400-space parking garage and a footbridge over the yard tracks to an additional surface lot. The garage was constructed on air rights over the yard while the yard remained in use. Colma station opened on February 24, 1996. It was the southern end of the BART system on the San Francisco Peninsula until the extension to the airport and Millbrae opened in 2003. Colma station was "prominently featured" in the 2006 film Colma: The Musical.
