= Millbrae station =

Train station in Millbrae, California, US

Millbrae
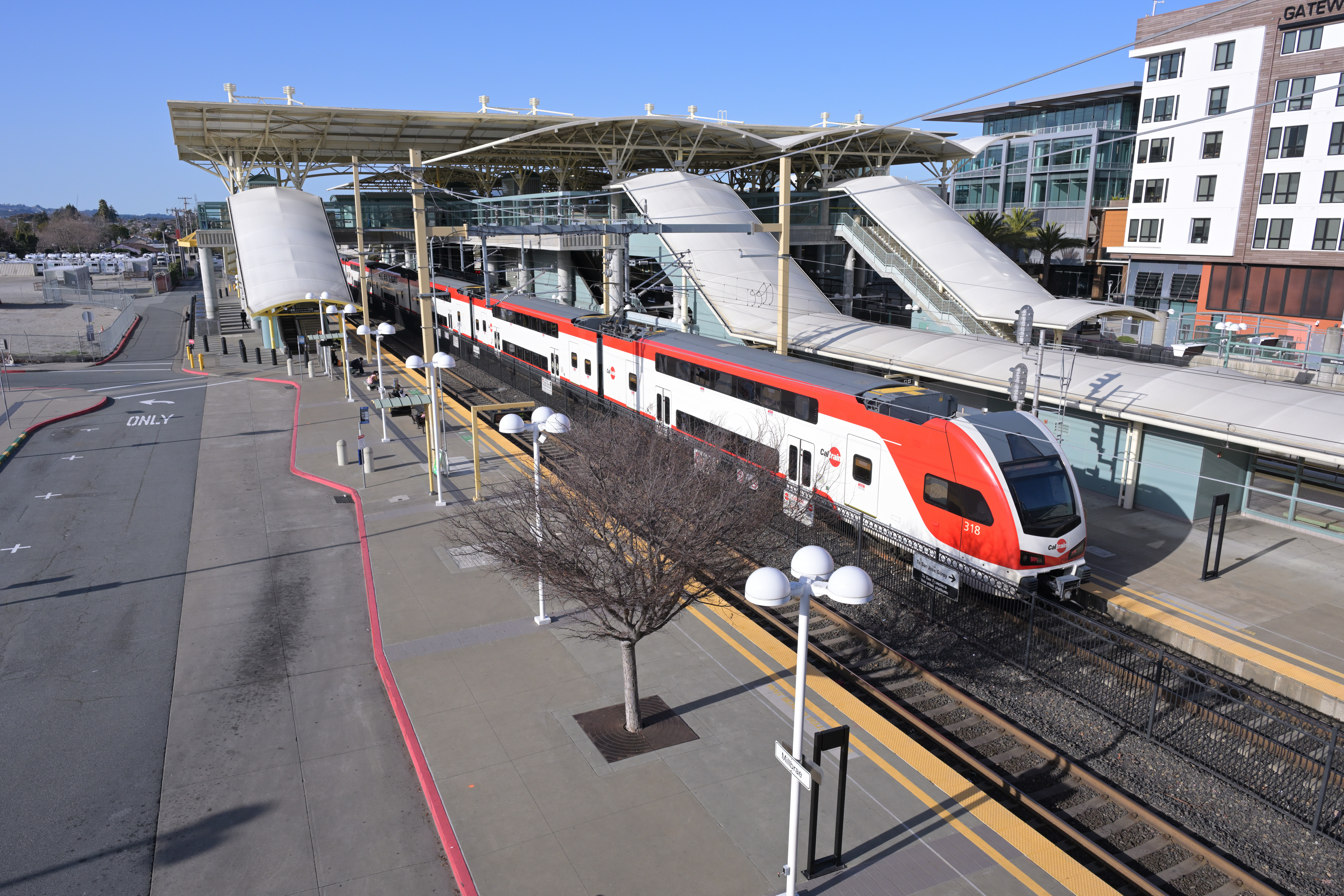
- A northbound Caltrain train at Millbrae in January 2026

General information
- Location: 200 North Rollins Road (BART); 100 California Drive (Caltrain); Millbrae, California; United States
- Coordinates: 37°36′01″N 122°23′12″W
- Lines: BART W-Line; PCJPB Peninsula Subdivision
- Platforms: 2 side platforms (Caltrain); 1 side platform, 1 island platform (BART)
- Tracks: 2 (Caltrain); 3 (BART)
- Connections: Commute.org shuttles: Burlingame Bayside, North Burlingame, North Foster City; Caltrain: Broadway/Millbrae shuttle; Flixbus; Genentech shuttle; SamTrans: ECR, 292, 397, 713; Sierra Point shuttle

Construction
- Parking: 2,900 spaces
- Cycle facilities: 30 lockers (BART); Racks (Caltrain)
- Accessible: Yes

Other information
- Station code: BART: MLBR
- Fare zone: 2 (Caltrain)

History
- Opened: 1863–64
- Rebuilt: 1890; 1907; June 22, 2003 (modern intermodal terminal)
- Former names: 17 Mile House (until c. 1865)

Passengers
- 2026: 2,518 (weekday average) (BART)
- FY 2025: 1,596 per weekday ▲32% (Caltrain)

Services
Preceding station	Bay Area Rapid Transit	Following station
Terminus	Red Line	SFO toward Richmond
Terminus	Yellow Line (after 9pm)	SFO toward Antioch via Pittsburg/Bay Point
Preceding station	Caltrain	Following station
San Bruno toward San Francisco	Local	Burlingame toward San Jose Diridon or Tamien
South San Francisco toward San Francisco	Limited	San Mateo toward San Jose Diridon
South San Francisco toward San Francisco	Express	San Mateo toward San Jose Diridon
San Bruno toward San Francisco	Weekend Local	Broadway toward San Jose Diridon or Tamien
Former services
Preceding station	Bay Area Rapid Transit	Following station
Terminus	Purple Line 2003–2004; 2019–2021	San Francisco International Airport toward SFO
San Bruno toward Dublin/Pleasanton	Dublin/Pleasanton–Millbrae line 2008–2009	Terminus
Terminus	Dublin/Pleasanton–SFO/Millbrae line 2004–2005	San Francisco International Airport toward Dublin/Pleasanton
Preceding station	Caltrain	Following station
San Bruno toward San Francisco	Local (L1)	Burlingame toward San Jose Diridon or Tamien
San Bruno toward San Francisco	Weekend Local (L2)	Broadway toward San Jose Diridon or Tamien
South San Francisco toward San Francisco	Limited (L3)	Hillsdale toward San Jose Diridon, Tamien or Gilroy
San Bruno toward San Francisco	Limited (L4)	Burlingame toward San Jose Diridon, Tamien or Gilroy
22nd Street toward San Francisco	Limited (L5)	San Mateo toward San Jose Diridon or Tamien
San Francisco Terminus	Baby Bullet (B7)	Hillsdale toward San Jose Diridon
22nd Street (reverse peak) toward San Francisco	Baby Bullet (B7)	Hillsdale toward San Jose Diridon
Preceding station	Southern Pacific Railroad	Following station
Lomita Park toward San Francisco	Coast Line	Broadway toward Los Angeles
Future services
Preceding station	California High-Speed Rail	Following station
San Francisco Terminus	Phase 1	San José toward Merced or Anaheim
Track layout
Key
Location

Millbrae station is an intermodal transit station serving Bay Area Rapid Transit (BART) and Caltrain, located in Millbrae, California. The station is the terminal station for BART on the San Francisco Peninsula, served by two lines: The Red Line before 9 pm and the Yellow Line during the early morning and evening. It is served by all Caltrain services. The station is also served by SamTrans bus service, Commute.org and Caltrain shuttle buses, and other shuttles.

Rail service to the area began with 17 Mile House station, which opened in 1864 on land deeded by Darius Ogden Mills; it was renamed Millbrae the next year. The station was rebuilt in 1890 and 1907 after twice burning down. The 1907-built station was threatened with demolition in 1976, but was added to the National Register of Historic Places in 1978. A modern intermodal terminal opened in 2003, connecting BART and Caltrain for the first time. The older station building was restored for use as a railway museum, which opened in 2004.

== Station layout ==
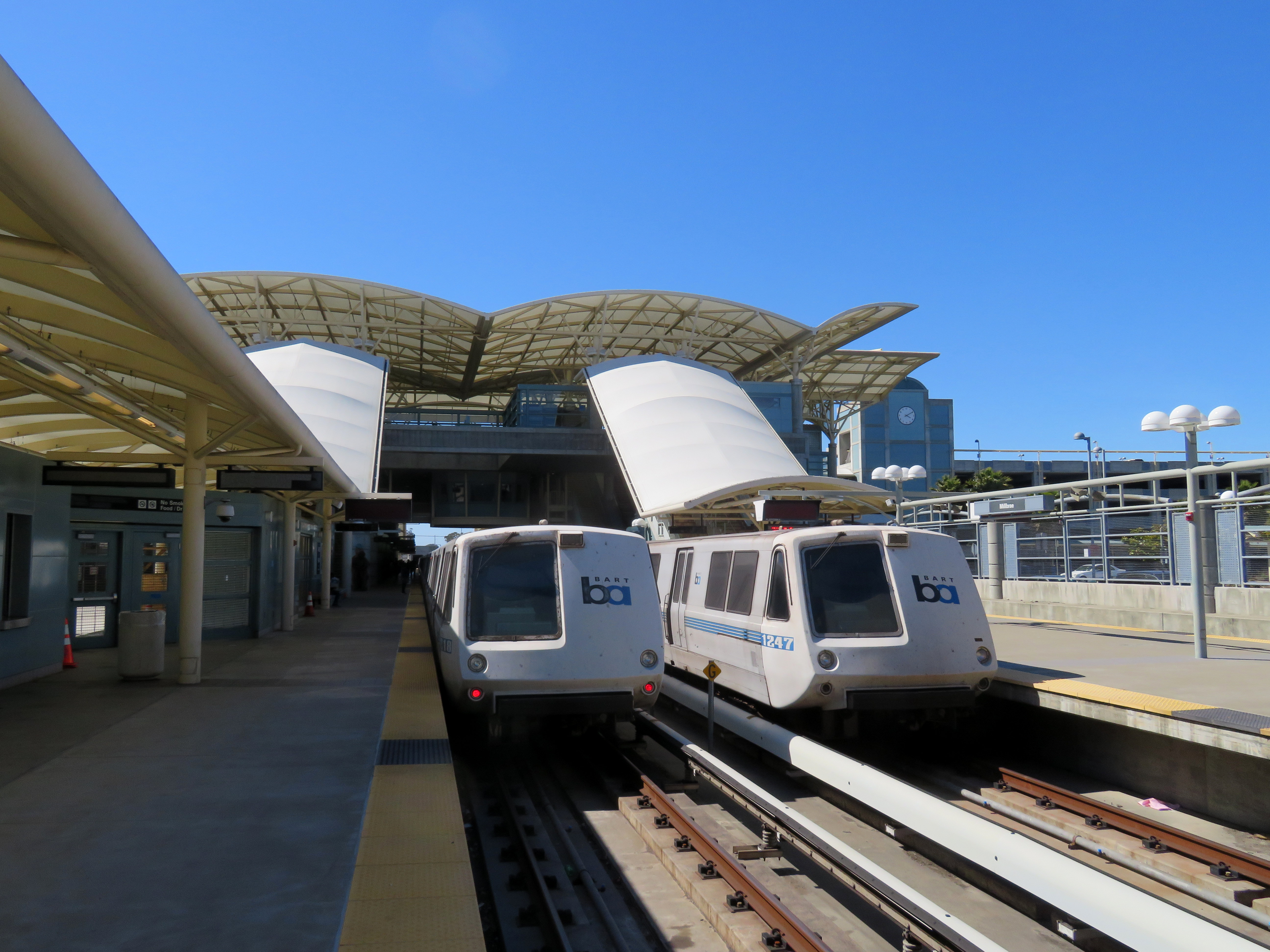
Two BART trains at Millbrae, with the left train in revenue service

Millbrae station has five tracks and three platforms at ground level, with a fare concourse on a mezzanine level above. The Caltrain tracks are on the west side of the station. The westernmost (southbound) track has a side platform; the northbound track uses half of an island platform shared with BART. South of the Millbrae Avenue bridge, the northbound track splits in two to form a triple-track section to allow passing trains. The northbound platform extends past the BART area as a side platform, and curves to serve the diverging track.

BART has three tracks; the western track serves the east side of the northbound Caltrain platform (with faregates between the two systems), allowing a cross-platform connection between northbound service. The other two tracks serve an island platform. Because ridership at Millbrae is lower than expected, only the western track is used in regular service; the other two tracks are used for train storage.

A 2,200-space parking garage (with direct access to the mezzanine), busway, and surface parking lots are located on the east side of the station. A smaller busway and parking lot for Caltrain are on the west side.

The BART platform at Millbrae has six sculptures partially embedded in concrete blocks, with each figure representing a different era in community history. Forty-two terrazzo benches installed at the station show scenes of local nature and history.

== History ==
=== Former stations ===
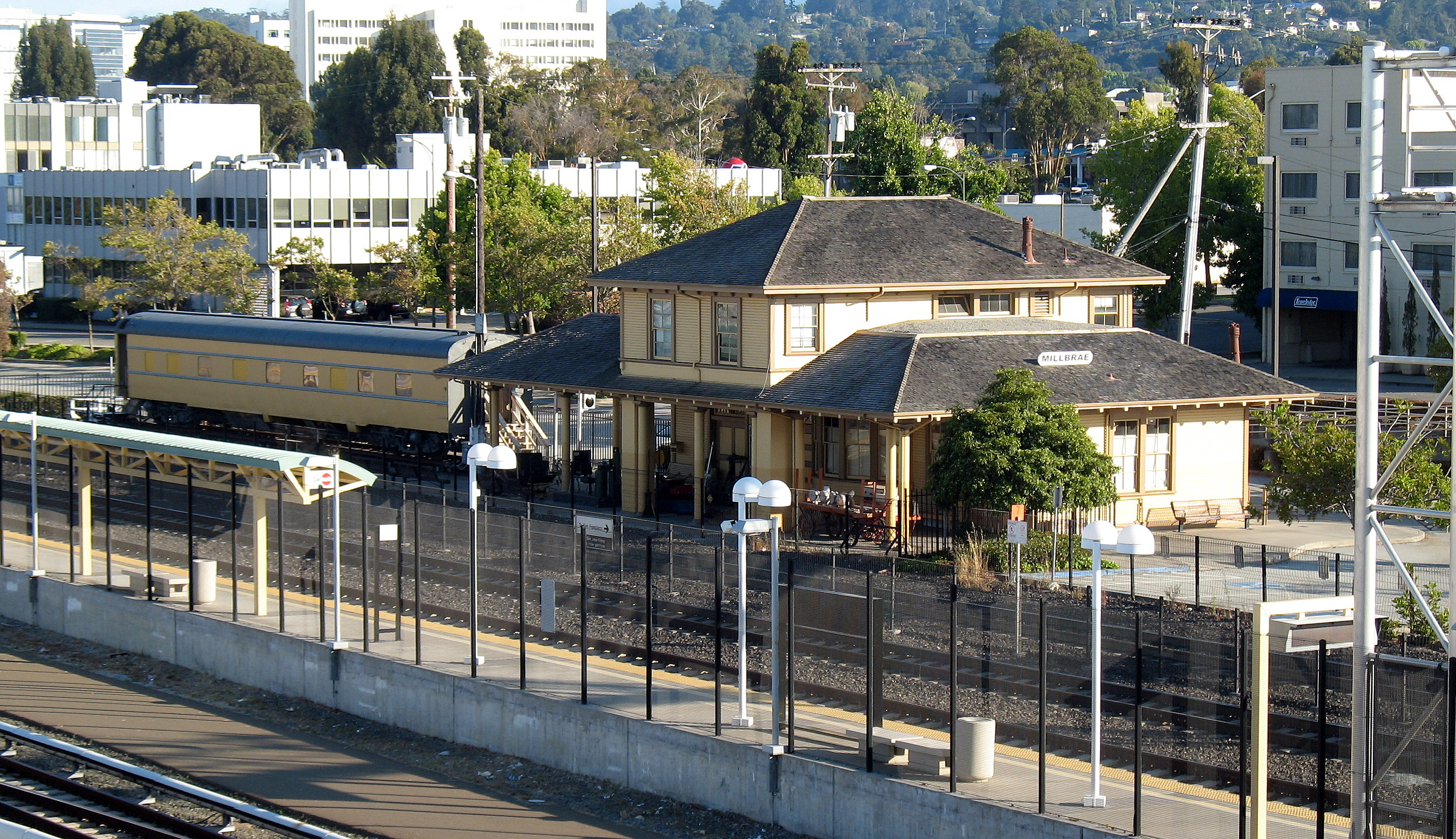
The old Southern Pacific station near the current intermodal terminal

In 1862, after buying a section of Rancho Buri Buri from José de la Cruz Sánchez, Darius Ogden Mills deeded land to the under-construction San Francisco and San Jose Railroad in exchange for a station to allow guests to visit his estate. The line opened in October 1863; the adobe 17 Mile House station opened in 1864 and was renamed Millbrae the next year. The line was soon taken over by the Southern Pacific Railroad (SP) for its Peninsula Commute service. The station burned in 1890.

The station burned again in 1906 and was replaced with a two-story colonnade-style depot of standard SP design the next year. It was located on the west side of the tracks just south of Millbrae Avenue. In 1976, preparing to discontinue the money-losing Peninsula Commute (which instead became publicly funded as Caltrain), the SP proposed to tear down the station. However, it was added to the National Register of Historic Places as the Southern Pacific Depot on September 1, 1978, after efforts by the newly formed Millbrae Historical Society. In August 1980, the building was moved 200 feet (61 m) south to make room for a widening of Millbrae Avenue.

=== Modern station ===
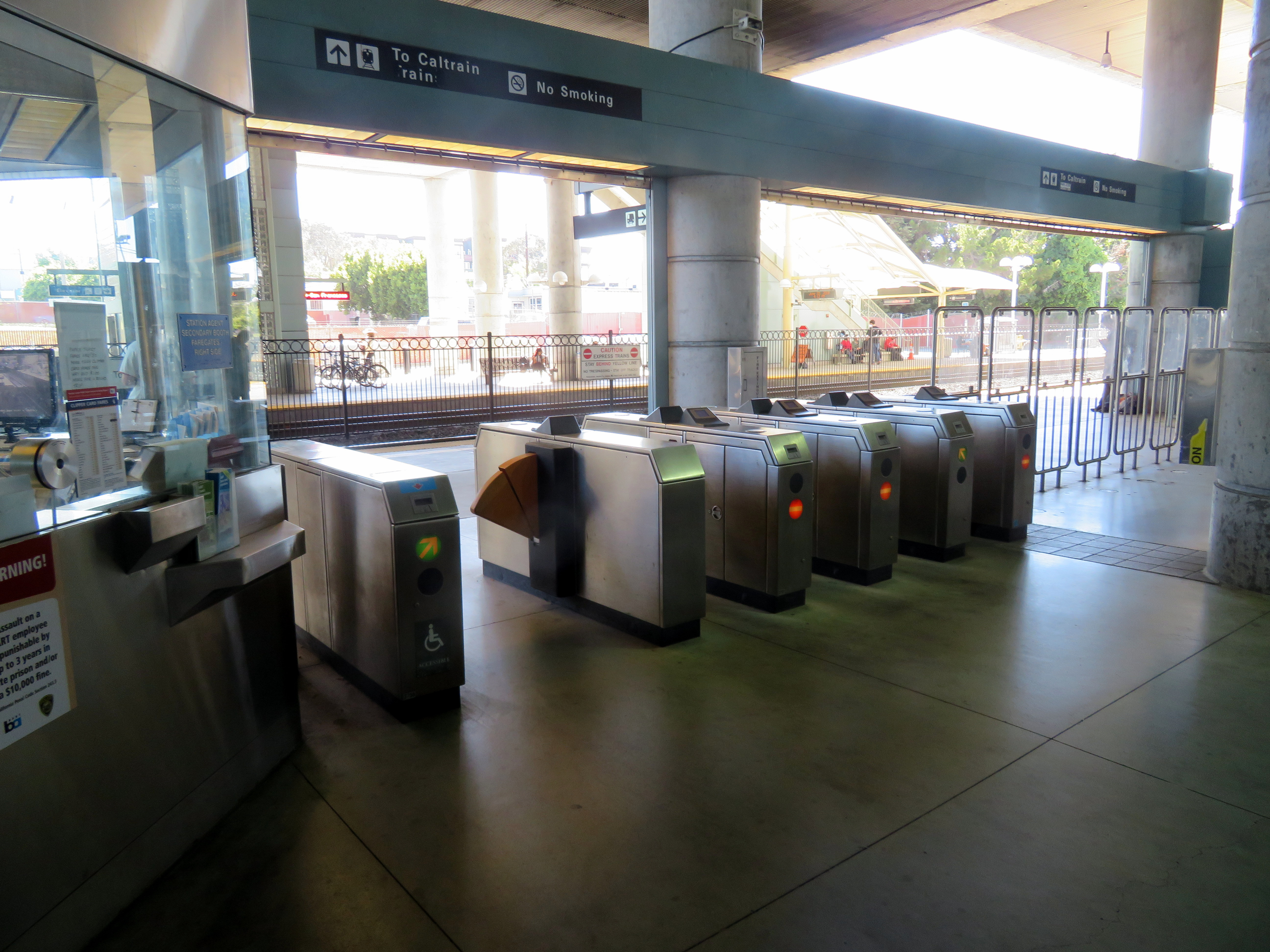
BART faregates which exit directly onto the northbound Caltrain platform

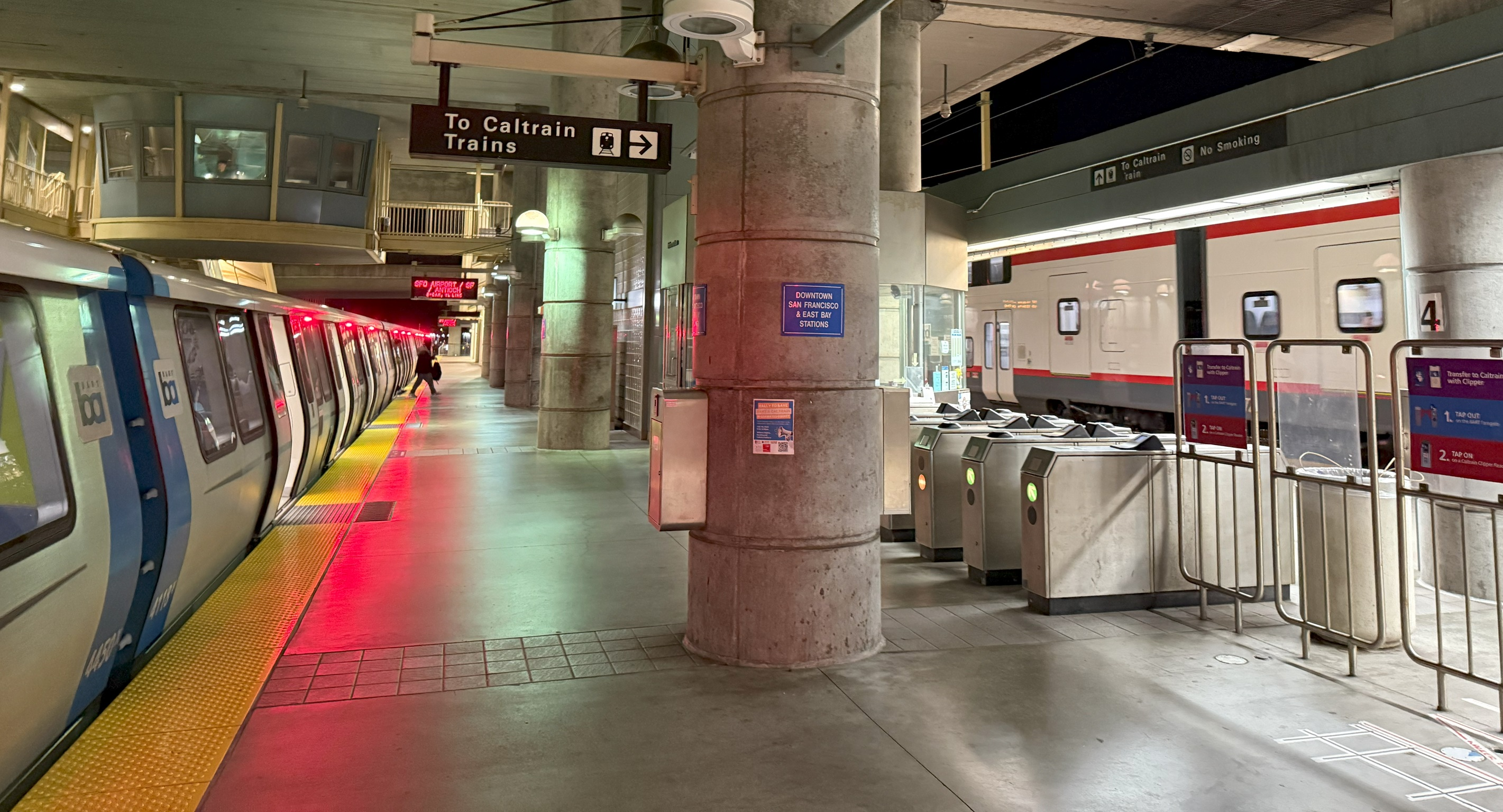
A BART SFO–Millbrae shuttle and a northbound Caltrain Stadler KISS on different sides of the western island platform in 2025

As part of the BART SFO Extension, a new intermodal terminal for BART, Caltrain, and Samtrans was built in Millbrae just north of Millbrae Avenue. BART service to the $70 million facility began on June 22, 2003. The station was initially served by the Pittsburg/Bay Point line, plus a shuttle service to San Francisco International Airport station (SFIA). The shuttle service was discontinued on February 9, 2004. The Richmond line began serving Millbrae at weekday peak hours, with the Pittsburg/Bay Point line providing service at other times.

BART service to stations in San Mateo County is funded by SamTrans, rather than county tax revenues. As ridership stayed below expectations, SamTrans had to pay a larger-than-planned operating subsidy to BART. On September 12, 2005, in order to lower these subsidies, BART reduced service so that only the Dublin/Pleasanton line served SFIA and Millbrae stations. SamTrans and BART reached an agreement in February 2007 in which SamTrans would transfer control and financial responsibility of the SFO/Millbrae extension to BART, in return for BART receiving additional fixed funding from SamTrans and other sources.

On January 1, 2008, BART increased service to the San Mateo stations. Service to Millbrae station was provided by the Richmond line on weekdays, and the Dublin/Pleasanton line on weeknights and weekends. Direct service between SFIA and Millbrae was discontinued. On September 14, 2009, the Pittsburg/Bay Point line was extended to Millbrae on nights and weekends (with the Dublin/Pleasanton line cut back to Daly City station), restoring direct service at those times. Millbrae station was expected to have some 16,500 daily BART boardings by 2017, but has consistently fallen well short of projections, with under 7,000 daily boardings by then.

On February 11, 2019, SFO–Millbrae line service resumed on weekdays and Sundays. The station continues to be served by the Richmond line on weekdays, with the Antioch line (formerly the Pittsburg/Bay Point line) serving both SFIA and Millbrae on weeknights and Saturdays. On February 10, 2020, the SFO–Millbrae line began running during all operating hours, with the Antioch line operating only to SFIA. SFO–Millbrae service ended on August 2, 2021; it was replaced by an extension of the Richmond line to SFIA weekdays and Saturdays, and an extension of the Antioch line to Millbrae evenings and Sundays.

Richmond (Red Line) service began operating on Sundays effective February 14, 2022, with Antioch (Yellow Line) trains serving Millbrae only during evenings. On September 11, 2023, the Red Line began running between Millbrae and Richmond via SFO, with Millbrae serving as a terminal at all operating hours. On January 13, 2025, a shuttle train began operating between SFO and Millbrae between 9 pm and midnight due to the installation of Communications Based Train Control equipment near Millbrae. It is signed as part of the Yellow Line.

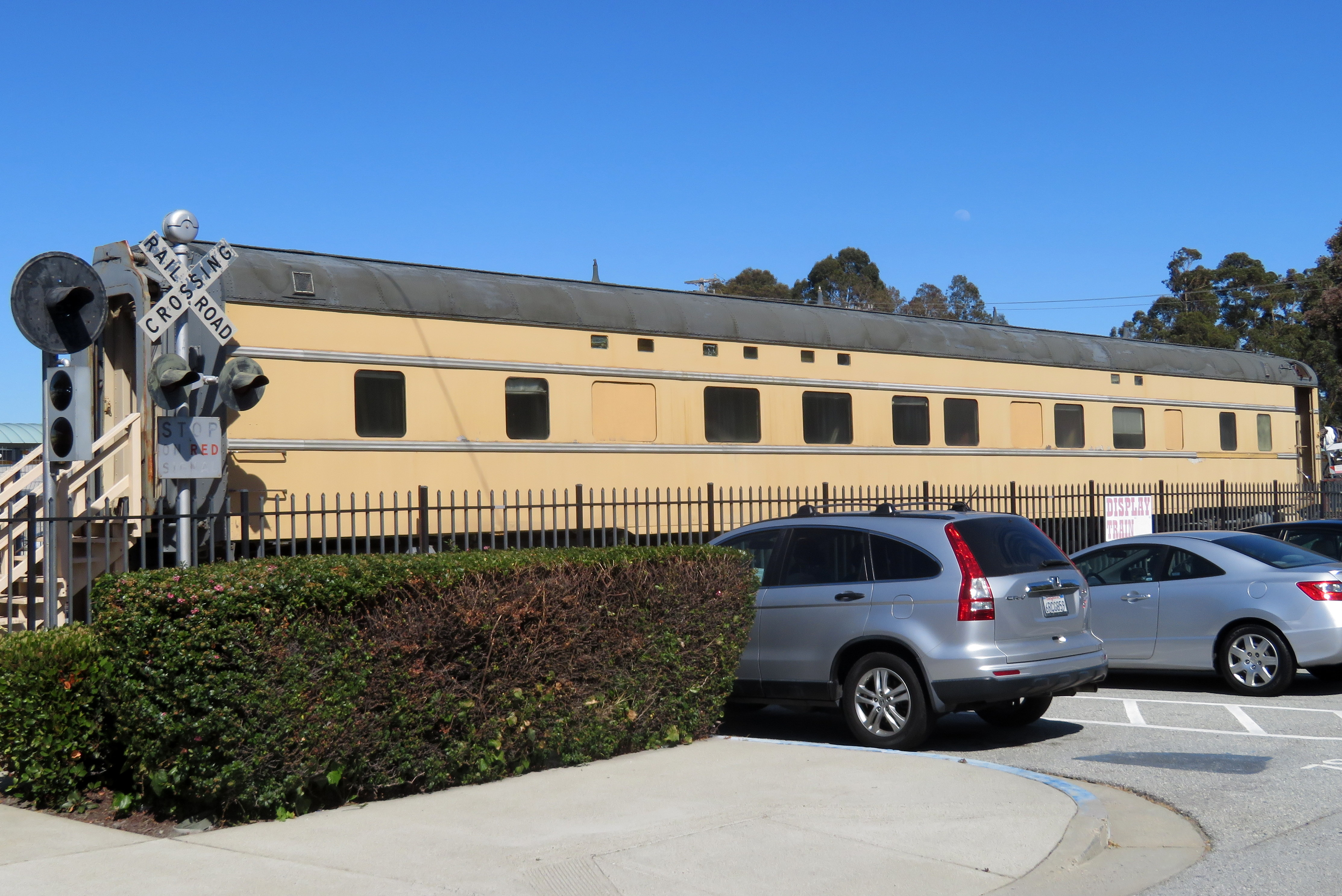
Civic Center on display in 2018

Caltrain no longer needed the historic station building after operations moved to the modern station. The Millbrae Historical Society negotiated with Caltrain to use the building as a museum in exchange for maintaining it. The Millbrae Train Museum opened in October 2004. In 2006, Pullman car Civic Center, built in 1941 for the City of San Francisco, was moved adjacent to the station and opened as an exhibit. The Society plans to acquire a locomotive and construct a section of track to run excursion service.

As built, Millbrae station had four large surface parking lots and a busway on the east side of the tracks. Construction of a mixed-use transit-oriented development project, Gateway at Millbrae Station, began replacing the surface lots in 2020. The first lot closed on January 25, the second on February 22, and the remaining two on March 23. The busway closed on May 18, 2020, with bus and shuttle stops relocated. The east surface entrance and elevator were temporarily closed from February 1 to June 6, 2022, with access to the garage maintained directly from the station concourse. The development was completed in 2023. It included 400 residential units, a 164-room hotel, and 150,000 square feet (14,000 m^{2}) of office space.

=== Future ===
Millbrae is planned to be a California High-Speed Rail station. Senate Bill 1029, passed in 2012, provided funds to lengthen the Caltrain platforms for future high-speed rail trains. The station is to be expanded to accommodate the service.

== Transit connections ==
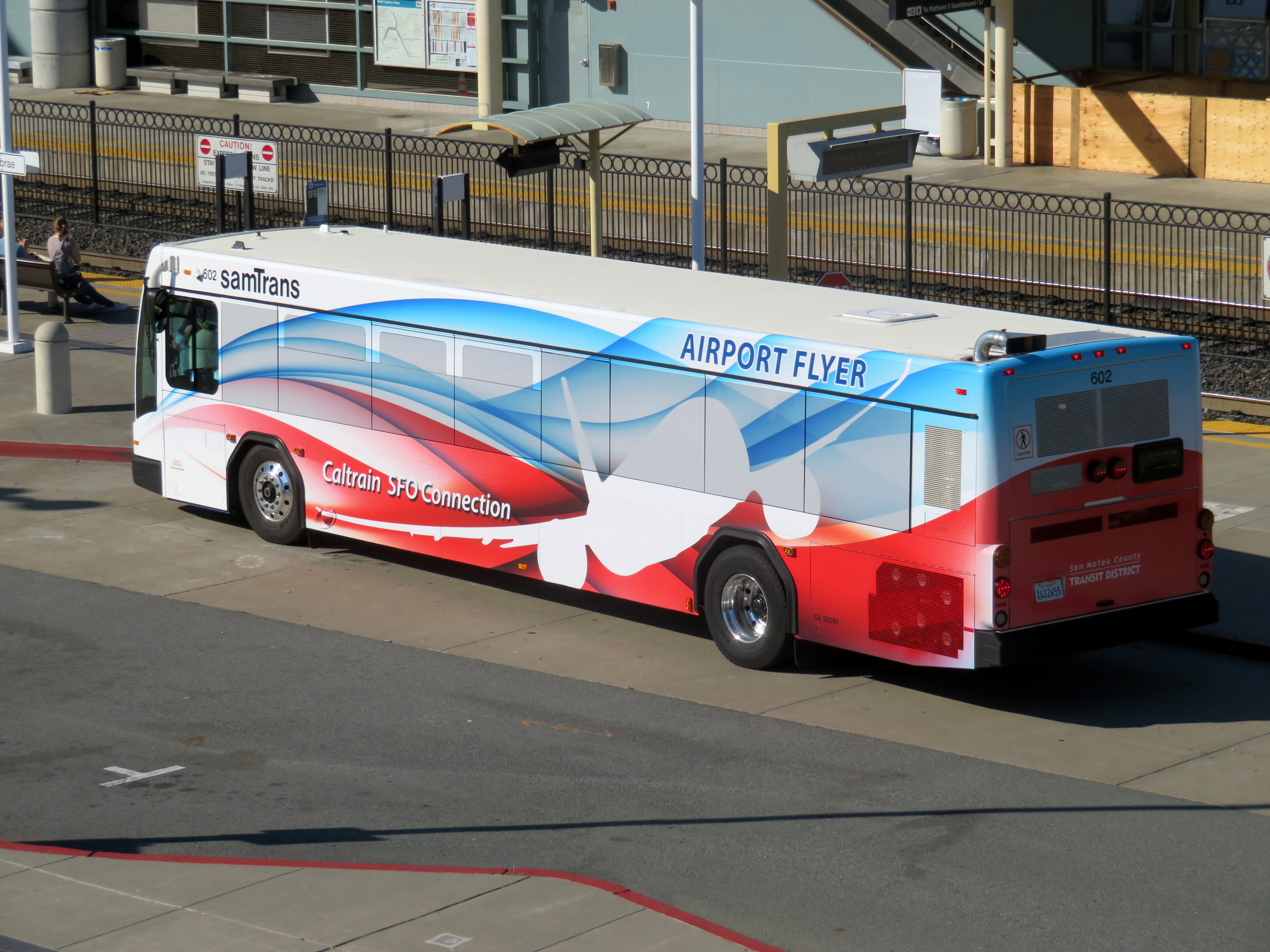
A SamTrans bus in the busway at Millbrae

Millbrae station is served by a number of bus routes and shuttles:

- Commute.org shuttles: Burlingame Bayside, North Burlingame, North Foster City
- Caltrain: Broadway/Millbrae shuttle
- Flixbus
- Genentech shuttle
- SamTrans: ECR, 292, 397, 713
- Sierra Point shuttle

A busway adjacent to the southbound Caltrain platform is used by the Burlingame-North Shuttle, Broadway Millbrae Shuttle, and SamTrans routes 38, 397, and 713. SamTrans route ECR stops on El Camino Real to the west of the station. Most of the shuttle services stop on Rollins Road east of the station.
