= The Shops at Tanforan =

Regional shopping mall in the United States

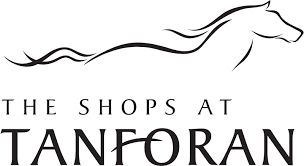

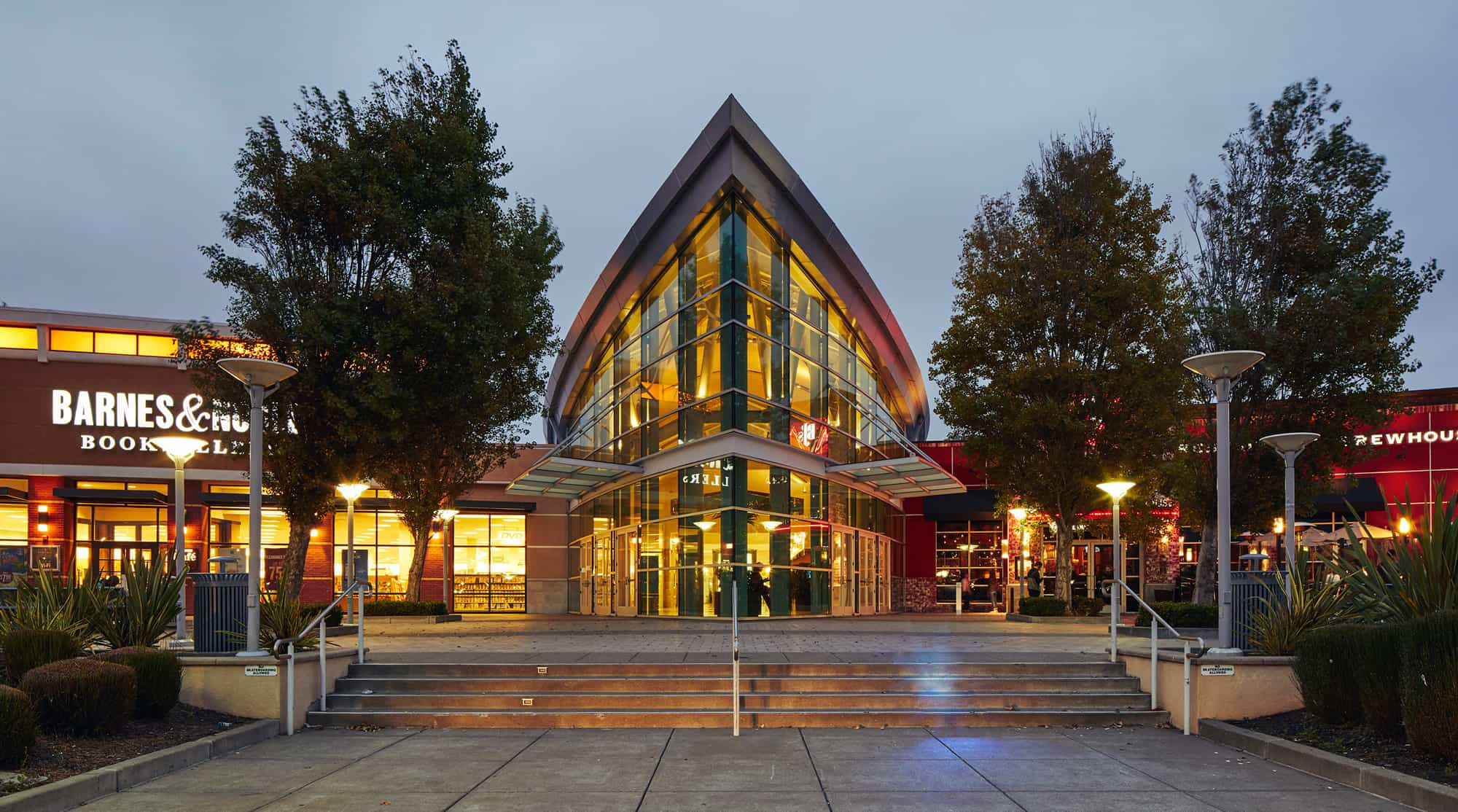
- Location: San Bruno, California, US
- Coordinates: 37.636°N 122.418°W
- Address: 1150 El Camino Real
- Opened: March 1971; 55 years ago
- Developer: Wattson Breevast (2003)
- Manager: QIC|GRE
- Owner: QIC|GRE
- Architect: Altoon + Porter Architects (2003)
- Num. of stores: 105
- Num. of anchor tenants: 4 (3 open, 1 vacant)
- Floor area: 969,107 sq ft (90,033.0 m^{2})
- Floors: 2 (3 in former Sears)
- Parking: 4074
- Public transit: San Bruno; Samtrans: ECR, 141, 142, 398
- Website: Official website

The Shops at Tanforan is a regional shopping mall in San Bruno, California, United States. It is located on the San Francisco Peninsula, 10 miles (16 km) south of San Francisco city limits.

The site was originally used as a horse racing track from 1899 until 1964, when the grandstand was destroyed by fire. During World War II the track was used as the Tanforan Assembly Center where Japanese American citizens, primarily from the San Francisco Bay Area, were interned until more permanent War Relocation Centers were opened. A shopping mall was built on the site and opened in 1971. The mall underwent a 3-year renovation, and reopened in 2005. In 2022, Alexandria Real Estate completed its acquisition of the site and announced the mall would be demolished and replaced with a biotech campus.

== History ==
The Tanforan site has been a racetrack, airfield, a military training center, a Japanese American internment camp, a golf course, and a retail complex.

=== Racetrack ===
The Tanforan Racetrack was built in 1899. It was named after Toribio Tanforan, the grandson-in-law of Jose Antonio Sanchez, the grantee of Rancho Buri Buri; the name was shortened to Tanforan. The Western Turf Association acquired 150 acres (61 ha) of land and began construction of the grandstand by September 1899, which was estimated to cost US$35,000 (equivalent to $1,350,000 in 2025) and scheduled to open in time for the season in November. Approximately 700 men were required to complete the track, and by late September, paving work had begun for the road servicing the new track, requiring 150 cu yd/d (110 m^{3}/d) of gravel.

Horse, dog, motorcycle, and auto races were held year-round at the track. A noteworthy resident during its use as a racetrack was Seabiscuit, who was stabled there for a time. A statue of Seabiscuit can still be found on the grounds.

The site was repurposed after 1909 when the state of California banned all gambling at racetracks. Races were held at Tanforan until the racetrack was destroyed by fire on July 31, 1964.

=== Airfield ===
Tanforan Racetrack was occasionally used as an airfield, with the center of the racetrack used as a runway. On January 25–26, 1910, the Tanforan Racetrack served as the site for the Second International Air Meet in America, organized by the Pacific Aero Club and attended by aviation notables Louis Paulhan and John J. Montgomery.

On January 18, 1911, aviator Eugene Ely made naval aviation history when he took off from Tanforan and made a successful landing on the USS Pennsylvania anchored in San Francisco Bay. This marked the first successful shipboard aircraft landing (and the second successful take-off). A plaque on the grounds commemorates this event.

Tanforan was temporarily converted into a military training center during World War I.

=== Tanforan Assembly Center ===
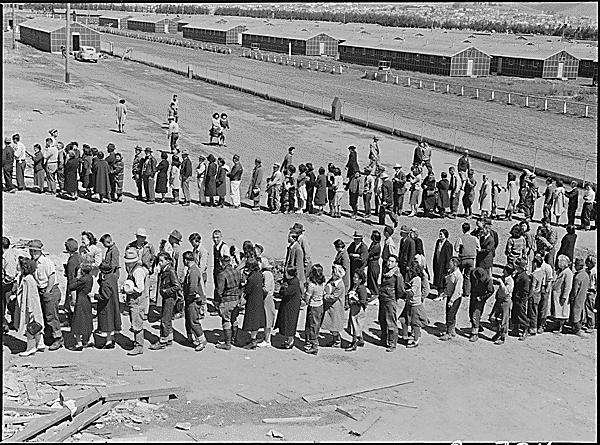
Line outside of a mess hall at the Tanforan Assembly Center

During World War II, Tanforan was used as the Tanforan Assembly Center, an internment camp for Japanese Americans, nearly all from the San Francisco Bay Area. Tanforan was the second most populous of the 17 "civilian assembly centers" where internees were detained before being relocated to more permanent (and remote) "relocation centers;" most internees at Tanforan were sent to the Topaz War Relocation Center near Delta, Utah. Twenty-six of the 180 "apartment" barracks were converted from horse stalls. 8,003 people were held at Tanforan from April 28 to October 13, 1942, with a peak population of 7,816 in July. A plaque outside the mall notes this history.

When the Assembly Center closed in 1942 the site became the US Army's Camp Tanforan. At the camp were the California Field Artillery Regiments. In 1944, the camp became the Naval Advance Base Personnel Depot, San Bruno, which closed on October 10, 1946. A number of soldiers who were once stationed at camp are buried at the Golden Gate National Cemetery, which is located on a nearby hill that overlooks the Tanforan site.

After the war, Tanforan returned to its former role as a race track, with a golf course in the center of the track. The track went into decline in the 1950s due to competition from Bay Meadows, and burned down on July 31, 1964.

=== Shopping Mall ===
In March 1971, the Tanforan Park Shopping Center was opened on the Tanforan racetrack site. The mall was designed by Victor Gruen Associates; the second floor was built as a mezzanine to allow a two-story ceiling above the center of the ground floor. Under the First Phase, the central mall and Sears store were scheduled for completion by February 1971. The mall was developed by The Hapsmith Company, led by Hap Smith and Frederick M. Nicholas, and built by Ernest W. Hahn, Inc. The two major anchor tenants in the First Phase were Sears with 276,000 sq ft (25,600 m^{2}) and J.C. Penney with 275,435 sq ft (25,588.7 m^{2}). The first phase also included 750,000 sq ft (70,000 m^{2}) of leasable area with space for 65 stores. The planned second phase would expand leasable area to 1,250,000 sq ft (116,000 m^{2}) with space for more than 100 stores. The Tire, Brake, and Accessory Section of Sears was the first store to open at Tanforan, on October 7, 1970.

The mall is bounded by El Camino Real (to the west), Sneath Lane (north), Huntington Avenue (east), and Interstate 380 (south). Property ownership was split between Sears, which owned the northern 11.74-acre (4.75 ha) portion of the site; Hapsmith, which owned the central 14.9 acres (6.0 ha); and JC Penney, the southern 14.99 acres (6.07 ha). The Sears building was 234,191 sq ft (21,757.1 m^{2}); the Emporium (later replaced by Target) building was 69,924 sq ft (6,496.2 m^{2}), and the JC Penney building was 186,000 sq ft (17,300 m^{2}).

The Emporium was the site's third anchor, opening that location in 1971; following the chain's acquisition by Federated Department Stores in 1995, the Tanforan Emporium was closed and the building was purchased by Target Stores in 1996. By that time, the dated mall was perceived as "dark and ugly" and occupancy had fallen to less than half, although anchor tenants continued to perform well. In 1999, the mall was purchased from Hapsmith by real estate investment firm Wattson Breevast LLC, who planned to redevelop it; Hapsmith retained a portion of the mall. There were many issues the new owners had to overcome: an eminent domain lawsuit involving BART, getting consent from the three existing anchors, each of which owned their property, moving out long-term tenants, existing building materials, and other city issues. It would be four years before the project's operations were ready to begin. After resolving a string of legal, construction, and administrative issues, renovations finally began in 2003. The existing stores were closed and the structure was gutted, retaining only the exterior walls, with the exception of the three main anchors (Target, Sears, and J.C. Penney), all of which remained open throughout the major reconstruction. A groundbreaking ceremony for the reconstruction was held on February 9, 2004. BART's new station opened in 2003 on what was part of the original mall's property; in 2001, the four property owners received $34 million as a settlement from the eminent domain proceedings of BART, which was used to fund the three-level parking structure.

=== Reconstruction ===
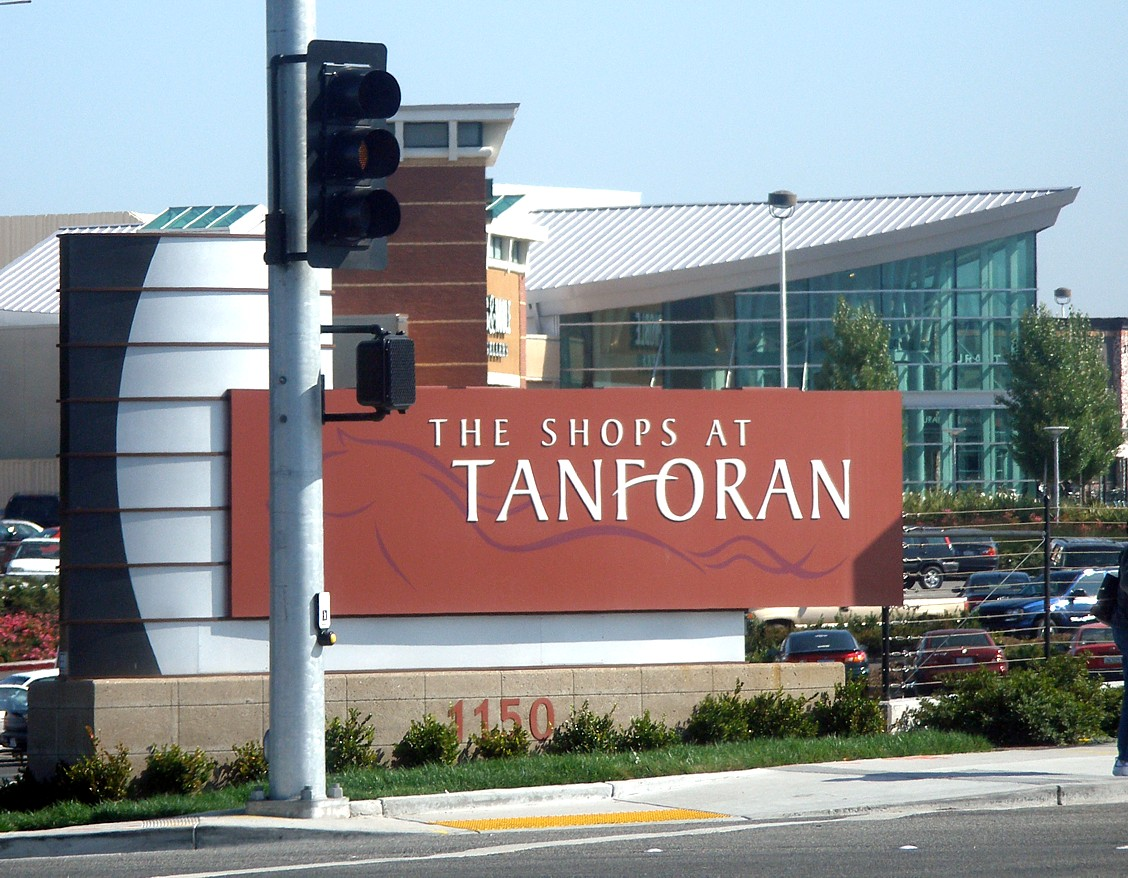
New name and new main entrance

Altoon + Porter Architects were hired for the mall's new design, and Brio Engineering Associates performed consulting engineering for the remodel and expansion. The US$140 million project was completed after 20 months. On October 7, 2005, the mall reopened as The Shops at Tanforan, adding 300,000 sq ft (28,000 m^{2}) of shops and restaurants, including a new main entrance (facing El Camino Real) and food court. As reconstructed, the mall portion was 326,000 sq ft (30,300 m^{2}), a 26,000 sq ft (2,400 m^{2}) expansion compared to the structure as completed in 1971. The total floor area as reconstructed was 1,100,000 sq ft (100,000 m^{2}). A two-level Barnes & Noble bookstore and a BJ's Chicago Brewhouse flank the new glass atrium entrance facing El Camino. The mall was also scheduled to add a new parking garage and movie theater. The increased sales tax revenue for the city of San Bruno helped to offset the closure of a longtime Ford dealer. On April 18, 2008, Century Theatres held its grand opening for a new 72,000 sq ft (6,700 m^{2}) 20-screen theater complex at this location, with a skybridge connecting the mall to the new building. The bottom floor of the garage also serves as a walkway to both a new substation of the San Bruno Police Department and the adjoining San Bruno BART station.

=== Decline ===
In 2015, Sears Holdings spun off 235 of its properties, including the Sears at The Shops at Tanforan, into Seritage Growth Properties. The mall property was sold by Breevast to Queensland Investment Corporation (QIC), an Australian investment firm, in August of that year for $174 million. The property's Sears store was sold to mall ownership in 2018. The store later closed in early 2020. It was later sold to Alexandria Real Estate in late 2021 for $128 million.

Shifting of consumer shopping practices online due to the retail apocalypse, alongside the COVID-19 pandemic in California, caused a decline in the mall's foot traffic. On July 2, 2019, a shooting occurred on the upper level of the food court; as a precaution, the mall and nearby BART station were evacuated. Four people were injured during the shooting, which left some reluctant to return to the mall. Four teenagers were arrested in connection with the shooting. Later that year, retailer Forever 21 went bankrupt and announced plans to close the company's San Bruno location at Tanforan. As part of JCPenney's 2020 bankruptcy process, the company's store in San Bruno was sold to Alexandria Real Estate for $105 million. The store closed on May 25, 2025, leaving Century Theatres and Target the two remaining anchors.

=== Closure ===
On July 27, 2021, the San Bruno City Council adopted the Reimagining Tanforan Land Use Fact Sheet, encouraging potential land owners to explore non-retail options at the site, including office, residential, and hotel uses. In February 2022, Alexandria announced it had purchased the remaining central portion of the mall property from QIC, including the mall's Target store, and confirmed it would transform the property into a "mega campus" for biotech and technology firms.

For the time being, car dealerships have opened up in the former Sears: Hyundai of San Bruno and Genesis of San Bruno. It closed in 2026.

== Gallery ==
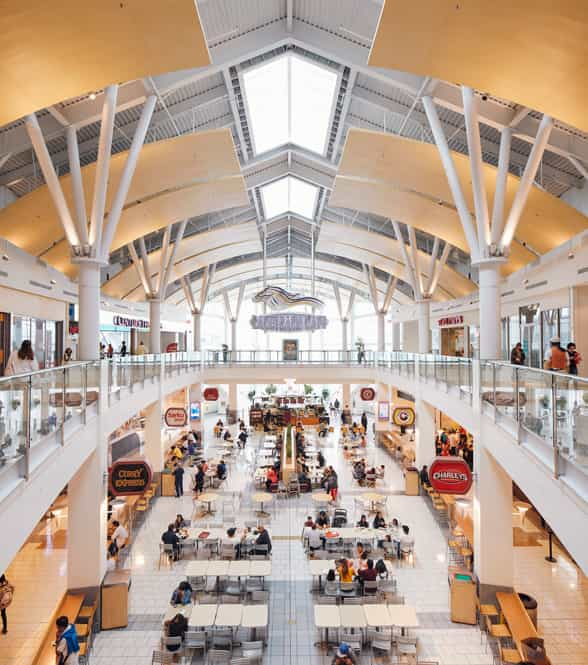
