= Commute.org =

San Mateo County transport planning agency

Peninsula Traffic Congestion Relief Alliance
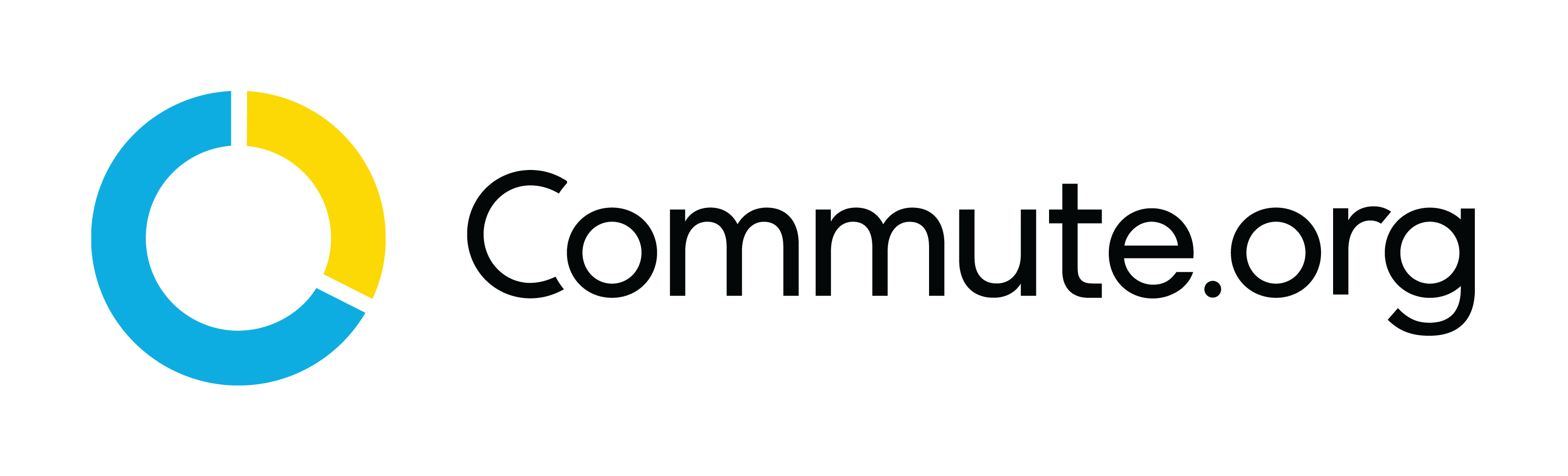
- Founded: 2000
- Headquarters: South San Francisco, California
- Service area: San Mateo County, California
- Service type: Shuttle bus
- Routes: 20
- Operator: MV Transportation
- Website: www.commute.org

The Peninsula Traffic Congestion Relief Alliance, branded as Commute.org, is the transportation demand management (TDM) joint powers agency for San Mateo County, California, United States.

In 2025, Commute.org received TDM accreditation from the Association for Commuter Transportation.
