= List of Caltrain stations =

The current Caltrain system map

Caltrain is a commuter rail transit system that serves the San Francisco Peninsula and the Santa Clara Valley in the U.S. state of California. It is operated under contract by TransitAmerica Services and funded jointly by the City and County of San Francisco, San Mateo County Transit District (SamTrans), and Santa Clara Valley Transportation Authority (VTA) through the Peninsula Corridor Joint Powers Board (PCJPB). The system's average mid-weekday ridership is 65,095 as of February 2018.

The original railroad between San Francisco and San Jose (known as the Peninsula Commute) was built by the San Francisco and San Jose Railroad in 1863. In 1870 the railroad was acquired by Southern Pacific. Southern Pacific double tracked the line in 1904. In 1958 the railroad had record ridership, 7.5 million passengers. The popularity of the railroad began to decline and in 1977 Southern Pacific petitioned to the state government to discontinue Peninsula Commute. After months of negotiation, the California Department of Transportation (Caltrans) reached an agreement with the three counties of which the Peninsula Commute ran through to continue rail operation. Under the agreement, the system was renamed Caltrain and operation responsibilities were shared by Caltrans, Southern Pacific and the three counties. The Peninsula Corridor Joint Powers Board was formed in 1987, and it bought the right of way of Caltrain from Southern Pacific in late 1991 for $220 million. The PCJPB formally took over the operation of Caltrain in 1992 and contracted Amtrak to operate the system. In the same year, Caltrain extended to Gilroy. Amtrak's contract with PCJPB was renewed in 2001.

The system has 30 stations. 28 stations are served daily, one (Broadway) is served on weekends and holidays only, and the other (College Park) is served via two round trips on weekdays only. San Francisco 4th and King Street is the northern terminus of the system, while Gilroy is the southern terminus. The five southernmost stations—Capitol, Blossom Hill, Morgan Hill, San Martin, and Gilroy—are served only on weekdays during commute times by select trains. Sixteen stations are served by the limited train service. Eleven stations are served by the express train service, inaugurated in 2004. Seven stations (Millbrae, (Note: Millbrae station's original depot and platforms were closed in 2003 when Caltrain relocated to the new Millbrae Intermodal Terminal just to the north. The depot now houses the Millbrae Train Museum.) Burlingame, San Carlos, Menlo Park, Palo Alto, Santa Clara, and San Jose Diridon) are listed on the National Register of Historic Places.

Of the 30 stations in the system, 27 of them are accessible. The three stations that are not accessible are in order from north to south, 22nd Street, Broadway, and College Park. The weekend and holiday-only Broadway station is planned to be completely rebuilt; upon completion, it would be ADA-compliant. The non-accessible Atherton station was closed on December 13, 2020. Of the four non-accessible stations in the system, only 22nd Street sees regular service. A plan to add ADA-compliant ramps to the station is currently being considered.

== Stations ==
	Limited stations
	Limited and Express stations
	South County Connector stations
	Select trip only stations
Transfer to other system	Transfer stations with other rail systems
Disabled access	ADA compliant stations

Fare zone	Mile (Note: Station mileposts are based on track distance from the former 3rd and Townsend Southern Pacific Depot 0.2 miles northeast of the current San Francisco station. Actual station distances south of Lawrence station no longer match the given mileposts (e.g. current track distance from San Francisco to the San Jose station is 46.8 miles).)	Location	Station	Abbr.	2018 weekday ridership	Connections/Notes	Image
1	0.2	San Francisco	San Francisco	SFK	15,427	Muni Metro: Muni Bus: 15, 30, 31, 45	View of an urban railroad terminal station with six island platforms
1	1.9	San Francisco	22nd Street	TWE	1,977	Muni Bus: 48, 55	A railway station under an elevated highway
1	5.2	San Francisco/ Brisbane	Bayshore	BAY	247	Muni Metro: (at Arleta); Commute.org: BCP	A train at a station with a large footbridge
1	9.3	South San Francisco	South San Francisco	SSF	468	Commute.org: OPC, UGC; SamTrans: 130/130B, 292, 397	Overhead view of a train at a railroad station
1	11.6	San Bruno	San Bruno	SBR	695	SamTrans: 41, 142, EPX, ECRO	The platforms of an elevated railroad station
2	13.7	Millbrae	Millbrae	MIL	3,340	BART: Commute.org: BAY, BPT, MBC, NFC; SamTrans: ECR, 292, 397, 713	A railway station with multiple platforms and a large canopy structure
2	15.2	Burlingame	Broadway (Note: At this station, Caltrain applies a "hold-out rule": a train cannot enter the station when a train on the other track is stopped at the station for passengers.)	BWY	114 (Sat & Sun)	Weekend and holiday service only.; Commute.org: MBC; SamTrans: 46, 292	A train at a railroad station with narrow platforms
2	16.3	Burlingame	Burlingame	BUR	1,104	SamTrans: 46, 292	A yellow Mission-style railroad station building
2	17.9	San Mateo	San Mateo	SMT	2,291	SamTrans: CSM, 59	Overhead view of a suburban railroad station
2	19.1	San Mateo	Hayward Park	HPK	583	—N/a	Platforms of a suburban railroad station
2	20.0	San Mateo	Hillsdale	HIL	3,229	Commute.org: FCC, HCC; SamTrans: ECR, 51, 57, 251, 397	A train at an elevated urban railroad station
2	21.9	Belmont	Belmont	BEL	780	Commute.org: RLC; SamTrans: ECR, 60, 62, 67, 260, 397	Two trains at an elevated railroad station
2	23.2	San Carlos	San Carlos	SCS	1,331	SamTrans: ECR, 61, 260, 295, 397	A train at an elevated railroad station
2	25.4	Redwood City	Redwood City	RWC	4,212	Commute.org: SEA; SamTrans: ECR, EPX, 270, 276, 278, 295, 296, 296O, 397; Stanford University: Marguerite Shuttle	A train at an urban railroad station
3	28.9	Menlo Park	Menlo Park	MPK	1,728	SamTrans: 82, 83, 86, 296; Midday Shuttle: M1, M3	A pink railroad station building
3	30.1	Palo Alto	Palo Alto	PAL	7,764	SamTrans: 280, 281, 296, 397, ECR; Dumbarton Express; VTA: 21, 22, 522; Stanford University: Marguerite Shuttle	A Streamline Moderne style railroad station building
3	31.8	Palo Alto	California Avenue	CAL	1,693	VTA: 89; Stanford University: Marguerite Shuttle	A small gray railroad station building
3	34.1	Mountain View	San Antonio	SAT	943	VTA: 21	A train at a suburban railroad station
3	36.1	Mountain View	Mountain View	MVW	4,810	VTA light rail: VTA: 21, 40, 51, 52, 200; MVgo A, B, C, D, Gray, Red	A two-story wooden railroad station building
3	38.8	Sunnyvale	Sunnyvale	SUN	3,364	VTA: 20, 21, 53, 55, 523	A train at a railroad station with a parking garage behind
4	40.8; Caltrain	Sunnyvale	Lawrence	LAW	949	—N/a	A train at a suburban railroad station
4	44.7	Santa Clara	Santa Clara	SCL	1,097	Amtrak: Capitol Corridor; Altamont Corridor Express; VTA: 21, 22, 53, 59, 60, 522	A wooden railroad station building
4	46.3	San Jose	College Park	CPK	108	Two daily round trips only.	A train passing a small flag stop shelter
4	47.5	San Jose	San Jose Diridon	SJD	4,876	Amtrak: Capitol Corridor, Coast Starlight; Altamont Corridor Express; VTA light rail: VTA: 22, 64A, 64B, 68, 202, 500, 568; Santa Cruz Metro: 17	A large brick Mission-style railroad station building
4	49.1	San Jose	Tamien	TAM	1,286	VTA light rail: VTA: 25, 56, 201, 256	A railroad station platform with an overhead canopy
5	52.4 UPRR	San Jose	Capitol	CAP	78	VTA: 66, 68, 568	A suburban railroad station platform
5	55.7 UPRR	San Jose	Blossom Hill	BHL	146	VTA: 568	A suburban railroad station platform
6	67.5 UPRR	Morgan Hill	Morgan Hill	MHL	237	VTA: 68, 287, 568	A suburban railroad station platform
6	71.2 UPRR	San Martin	San Martin	SMR	87	VTA: 68, 287, 568	A rural railroad station platform
6	77.4 UPRR	Gilroy	Gilroy	GIL	252	VTA: 68, 84, 85, 86, 568; MST: 59; Gold Runner: 40; LTA: County Express	A two-story pink railroad station building

== Closed stations ==
Mile	Station	Closed	Fare zone	Location	Notes
4.1	Paul Avenue	2005	1	San Francisco	Closed due to low ridership.
8.6	Butler Road	1983	1	South San Francisco	Closed due to the closure of the adjoining steel mill.
20.0	Bay Meadows	2005	2	San Mateo	Consolidated with Hillsdale station.
27.8	Atherton	2020	3	Atherton	Closed due to low ridership and the hold-out rule.
30.8	Stanford	2026	3	Palo Alto	Closed due to ongoing Caltrain financial crisis.
34.9	Castro	2000	3	Mountain View	Replaced by San Antonio station.
