= Caltrain Express Program =

Faster San Francisco–San Jose rail service

Caltrain Express (CTX)
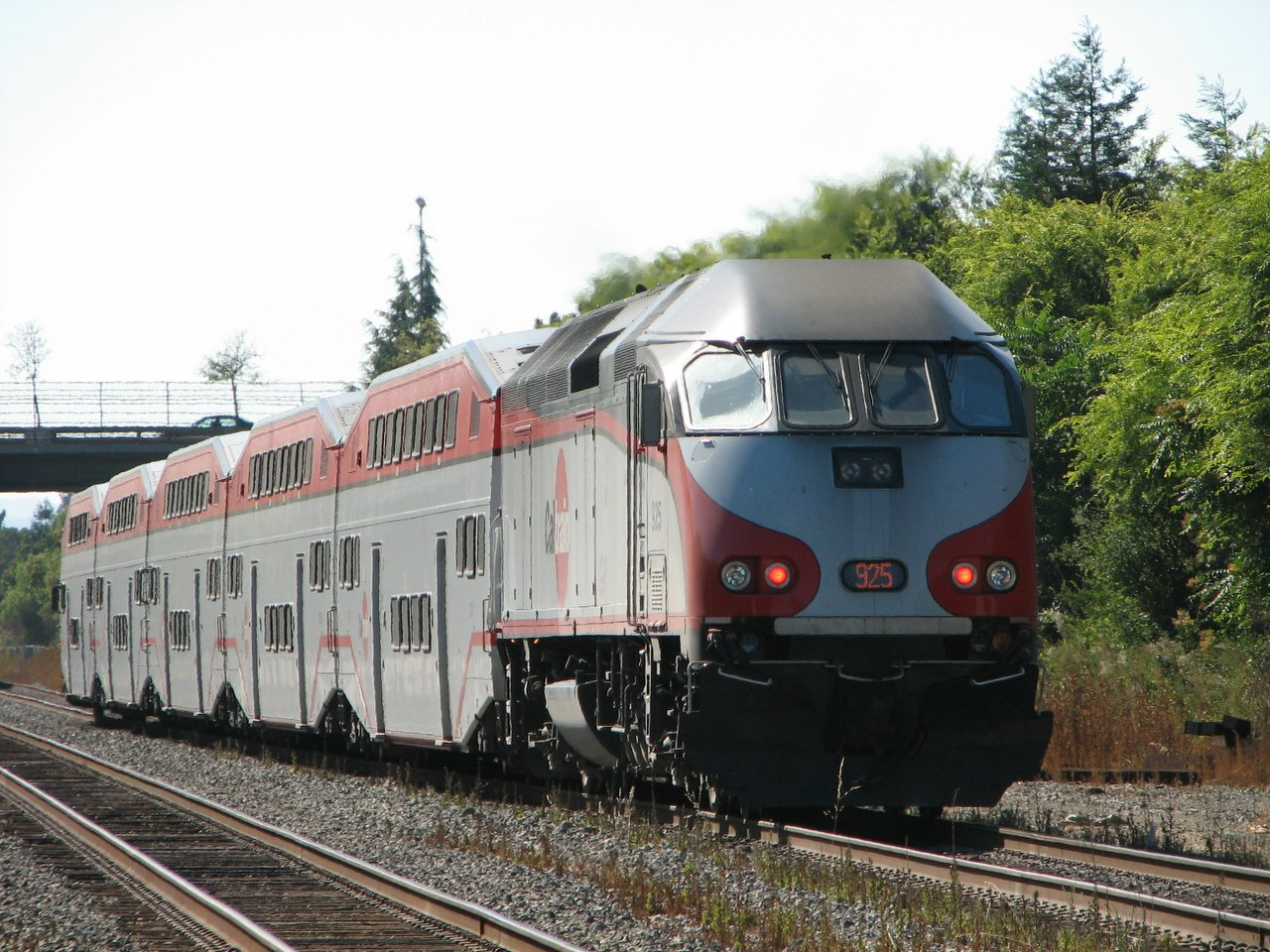
- Northbound Baby Bullet in 2005
- Location: San Francisco Peninsula
- Owner: Caltrain
- Established: April 4, 2002 (contract award)
- Launched: June 5, 2004 (revenue service)
- Status: In service
- Website: caltrain.com/news_ctx_fact_sheet.html (Archived Apr 12, 2003)

The Caltrain Express Program (CTX) was implemented from 2002 to 2004 to establish the Baby Bullet express service, which shortened the transit time on the Caltrain commuter rail line between San Francisco and San Jose, and certain stations in between. New locomotives and rolling stock were purchased for dedicated express service, bypassing most stations; quad-track overtake sections were added in two locations along the Peninsula Corridor right-of-way to allow express trains to pass slower local trains that were making all stops; tracks were also upgraded with continuous-welded rail; a centralized traffic control system was added; and crossovers were added every few miles to allow single-tracking trains around disabled trains. Congresswoman Jackie Speier, then serving as a California State Senator, is credited with securing the funding for CTX and one of the new locomotives acquired for the project is named for her as a result. During commute hours, the Baby Bullet went up to 20 percent faster than driving south from San Francisco to San Jose. On September 21, 2024, with the completion of the Caltrain modernization project and the transition to electrified trains, the Baby Bullet was renamed as simply the Express service.

== History ==
In 1997, after plans to extend Caltrain to downtown San Francisco were put on hold, the Peninsula Corridor Joint Powers Board (PCJPB) started the Rapid Rail Study, which was published as a draft in October 1998. The 1998 Rapid Rail Study prioritized planned capital improvements to implement the 1997 Caltrain 20-Year Strategic Plan, which sought to improve service and increase ridership, which was assumed to correspond directly to improved service (through decreased transit times and increased train frequencies). The highest-priority projects were intended to rehabilitate the line to "reverse decades of deferred maintenance" and enhance the line by adding overtake tracks to implement express service. After rehabilitation and enhancement, the Rapid Rail Study called for electrification of the line.

Proposed rehabilitation work included rebuilding tracks and grade crossings to enable Caltrain to raise the systemwide speed limit to 79 to 90 mph (127 to 145 km/h) and replacing bridges, culverts, and signals. The initial enhancement projects included adding third overtake tracks in Burlingame (between the stations at Millbrae and San Mateo, for northbound trains) and San Mateo (between 9th Avenue and Hillsdale, for southbound trains) to allow express trains to pass slower all-stop local trains, and adding a third turnback track in Palo Alto to allow more frequent short-line service. In 1999, PCJPB published an implementation plan for the Rapid Rail Study which called for a $280 million investment from the three counties served by Caltrain.

California State Senator Jackie Speier and Caltrain leadership are credited with the idea to provide an express service for Caltrain during a brainstorming session. Senator Speier sponsored Senate Bill 2003 in February 2000 authorizing US$127,000,000 (equivalent to $230,900,000 in 2025) to fund CTX; the first draft of the bill included funding to create "little bullet" express Caltrain service between San Francisco and San Jose (with the goal to cut transit time in half compared to local, all-stop service) and also to rehabilitate the Dumbarton Rail Bridge in preparation to reroute Altamont Corridor Express (then Altamont Commuter Express) service from Stockton over the Dumbarton Rail Corridor. By March 2000, the bill was being referred to as the "Baby Bullet Bill" and it passed the Senate Transportation Committee on a 9–0 vote in April 2000 after it had been amended to remove Dumbarton Rail and focus solely on establishing express service. The funding request for the Caltrain express service was later incorporated directly into the Governor's budget. CTX was one of the projects recommended by the Metropolitan Transportation Commission (MTC) under Resolution 3434 in December 2001.

=== Construction ===
CTX officially broke ground during a ceremony held at 4th and King on June 28, 2002. The groundbreaking was attended by officials and politicians who had supported CTX, including Senator Speier, Governor Gray Davis, Secretary of Transportation and Housing Maria Contreras-Sweet, MTC Commissioner Sue Lempert, Caltrans Director Jeff Morales, and San Mateo County Supervisor Mike Nevin. At the time, it was the largest capital improvement program for Caltrain.

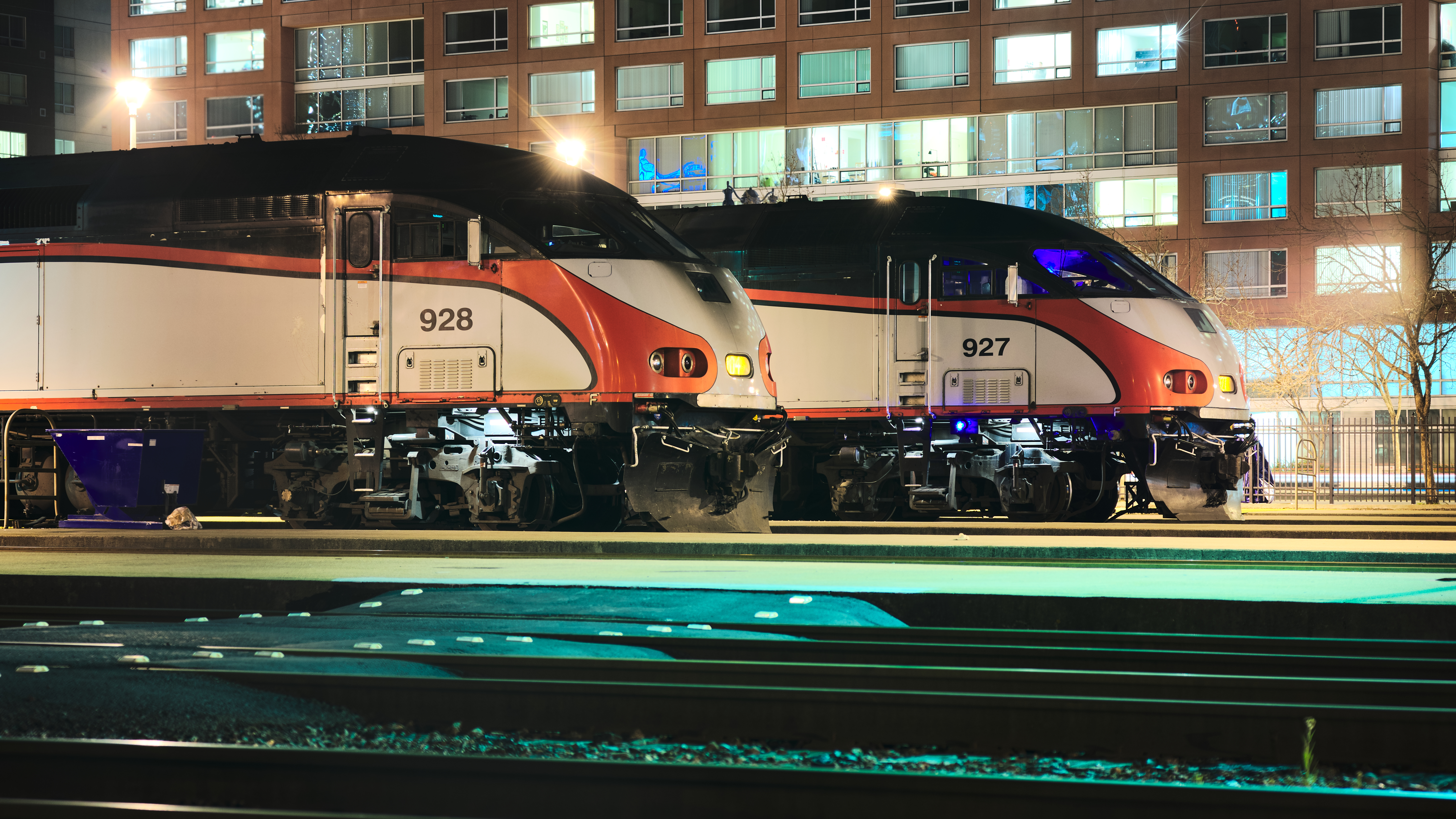
JPBX #927 and 928, the last two (of six) locomotives acquired for CTX, in San Francisco (2016)

During CTX construction, Caltrain shut down weekend service for two years starting in July 2002 to allow track work. samTrans introduced the RRX bus line to temporarily replace weekend Caltrain service, but RRX was not a direct replacement, as the ride between San Francisco and San Jose was scheduled for 98 minutes, buses only ran until 8 P.M., and the line only had two intermediate stops, at Hillsdale and Palo Alto. After construction was complete and weekend service resumed in June 2004, Caltrain offered free rides the first two weekends to lure riders back and to thank riders for their patience. During construction, service was also reduced to a single track on Thursday and Friday nights after 9 p.m.

=== Baby Bullet service ===
By April 2004, Caltrain was showing off the rolling stock it had acquired for Baby Bullet service. Construction was substantially complete by May 2004 when Caltrain began running "test" trains on the weekends to shake down the system and gain crew experience, and the Baby Bullet trains entered revenue service on June 7, 2004; the first northbound Baby Bullet discharged over 600 passengers upon its arrival in San Francisco at 6:45 a.m., and had carried more than 1,000 during its inaugural run. The first southbound Baby Bullet left San Francisco with 420 passengers at 7:20 a.m. Baby Bullet trains often ran at standing room capacity during the first year.

Just prior to the inauguration of Baby Bullet service, Caltrain served an average of 27,000 riders per weekday. One year later, Caltrain ridership had increased by 12%, and by 2014, ten years later, Caltrain ridership had more than doubled to over 60,000 riders per weekday. Notably, once San Mateo County commuters were given the choice between BART and Caltrain to San Francisco after the completion of the BART extension to San Francisco International Airport, many riders continued to prefer Caltrain and the Baby Bullet service, which was cheaper and quicker than switching to BART at Millbrae, in part because Caltrain, which follows the 1907 Bayshore Cutoff route constructed by Southern Pacific, does not take a long detour west around San Bruno Mountain to reach San Francisco.

In addition to having one of the new locomotives named for her, Senator Speier received MTC's John F. Foran Legislative Award for her pivotal role in bringing Baby Bullet service online. CTX received an award from the California Transportation Foundation as the Program of the Year for 2004. During the same ceremony, Speier was honored as the Legislator of the Year.

In 2017, the Rail and the California Economy report noted that Baby Bullet trains operated at 95% on-time performance (making stops within ten minutes of scheduled times) and, at around 60 minutes from San Francisco to San Jose, was faster than driving south on U.S. 101 during key commute hours. Driving times during peak afternoon commute hours could reach 75 minutes or more.

On September 21, 2024, with the completion of the Caltrain electrification project, the Baby Bullet was renamed as simply the "Express" service.

== Design ==
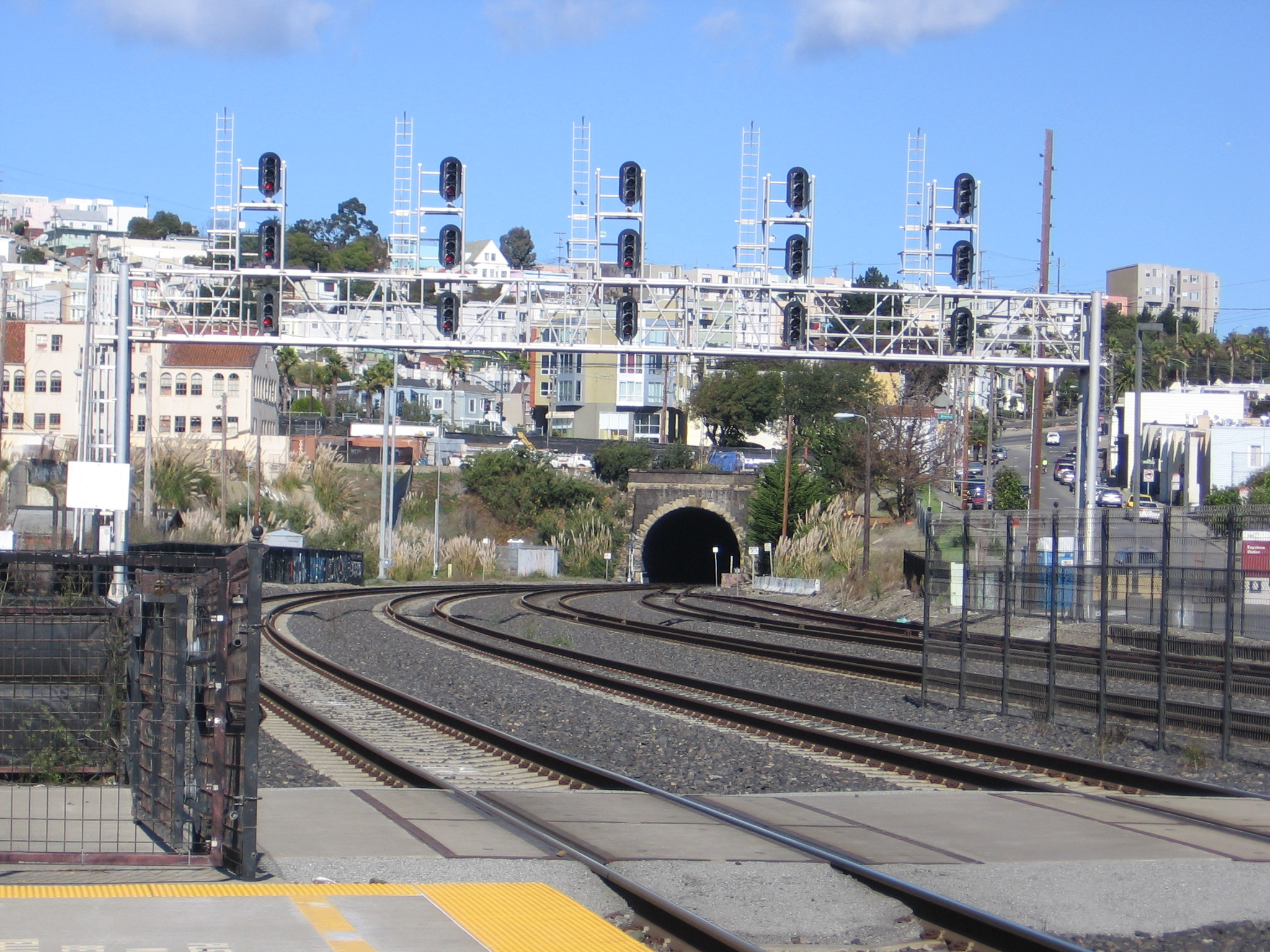
North overtake quad-track section just south of Tunnel #4, north of the Bayshore platform

Caltrain split the CTX project into two separate phases, based on geographic region. The North CTX extended from San Francisco to Redwood City, and the South CTX spanned the tracks from Menlo Park to Santa Clara. The North CTX contract was awarded in April 2002 to the joint venture of Herzog and Stacy Witbeck. Herzog-Stacy-Witbeck also won the South CTX contract, as announced in January 2003. The key elements of CTX were the overtake tracks, high-speed crossovers, and a central traffic control system which collectively allowed a single office to route trains. To support smoother operation at higher sustained speeds, Caltrain also laid down continuous-welded rails.

=== Station rebuilds ===
During the CTX project, Caltrain rebuilt the Bayshore station, relocating it slightly south of the prior location to accommodate the north quad track overtake section ending just south of Tunnel #4. This moved nearly all of the Bayshore station out of the City and County of San Francisco and broke a planned intermodal connection to the Third Street Light Rail Project, the first expansion phase of the Muni Metro light rail system, which was building tracks down Third Street. The new T Third Street line, which opened in 2007, terminates at Sunnydale Station as Muni Metro has never built any tracks in San Mateo County, and a planned 0.5-mile (0.80 km) loop extension to Bayshore was studied in 2012. A small rail bridge south of Bayshore was built over a creek as part of CTX.

The Lawrence station was in the right-of-way planned for the south quad-track overtake section, so Lawrence was rebuilt with new platforms and an under-track pedestrian tunnel. Work at Lawrence was anticipated to be completed by the end of 2003, and the rebuilt Lawrence was opened in March 2004.

The Millbrae station also received some upgrades; a third track was added and existing tracks were relocated, requiring Caltrain to demolish the existing platform. Millbrae station updates were scheduled to complete with the opening of the new intermodal station in January 2003.

=== Track upgrades (overtakes, crossovers, and traffic control) ===
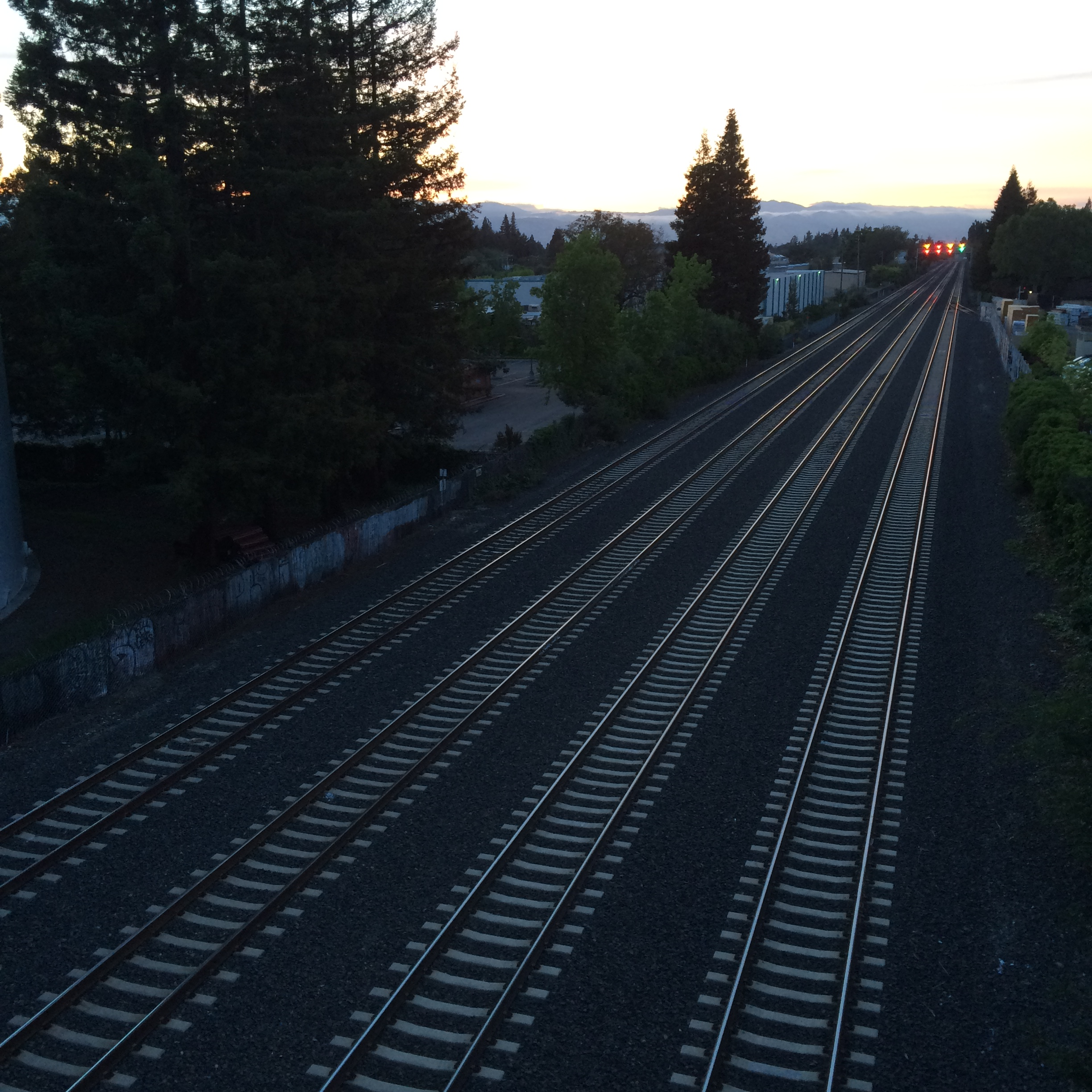
South overtake quad-track section south of Sunnyvale

CTX added quad-track overtake sections near the cities of Brisbane and Sunnyvale. During the initial design phase, overtakes were also announced for Millbrae and Redwood City. Millbrae gained a third track, and Redwood City added two sidings near Redwood Junction, approximately 1.2 miles (1.9 km) between Chestnut Street and Fifth Avenue. From north to south, the completed quad-track overtake sections are:

1. Brisbane, approximately 2 miles (3.2 km) between Candlestick Cove and Tunnel #4 (overlaps Bayshore Station)
2. Sunnyvale, approximately 2 miles (3.2 km) between Fair Oaks and Bowers (overlaps Lawrence Station)

CTX also included crossover switches, which improved operating flexibility to allow trains to bypass stalled trains, and a centralized traffic control (CTC) system, which allowed track signaling and switching operations to be handled from a single facility in San Jose, rather than relying on dispatched crews throwing manual switches. Prior to CTX, trains typically had to stop and de-board operators and conductors, who would throw switches by hand. Although CTC was already partially implemented near the two main terminals at San Francisco and San Jose, CTX added CTC throughout the route, and 12 signal bridges were added to the line in total.

By November 2002, Caltrain had rebuilt 5,900 feet (1,800 m) of track as part of the North CTX project, which included conversion to continuous welded rail and replacement of wooden ties with concrete ties. Full-speed testing of track upgrades occurred over two weekends in May 2004, just before the Baby Bullet service started in June. Crews and central control practiced overtaking slower trains and routing around delays induced by disabled trains.

=== Stops and scheduling ===
Baby Bullet service launched in June 2004 with ten trains per weekday, which made only four intermediate stops between San Francisco and San Jose Diridon: Millbrae, Hillsdale, Palo Alto, and Mountain View. The ten trains consisted of three northbound and two southbound trains in the morning, and three southbound and two northbound trains in the afternoon; the two southbound morning trains and two northbound afternoon trains made additional stops at 22nd Street to serve reverse commuters. Since these trains operated with far fewer stops, they took only 57 minutes to travel between San Francisco and San Jose, compared to 96 scheduled minutes for local trains making all stops, even though the maximum train speed remained at 79 miles per hour (127 km/h).

This cuts my commute so much that it's faster than driving.

— Scott Hofmeister, Inaugural day interview with San Francisco-to-Mountain View commuter, June 7, 2004

The revised schedule was the product of more than two hundred iterations, and added ten trains per weekday without increasing staffing because equipment was being used more efficiently. However, mid-day (off-peak) service was reduced at seven stations; trains used to stop every half hour, but the mid-day headway changed to every hour at 22nd Street, Bayshore, South San Francisco, Broadway, Hayward Park, Redwood City, Atherton, and Tamien.

Riders to stations not served by Baby Bullet service complained their commute times increased because their trains slowed to allow Baby Bullets to overtake. Clem Tillier noted ridership at stations not served by Baby Bullets continued to be depressed in the years following CTX implementation, and that elimination of Baby Bullet service under a planned 76-train schedule actually improved service quality. Caltrain had initially proposed trimming the schedule from 86 trains per weekday to 48 trains only during peak hours to close a budget gap in 2011, later refining the proposal to 76 trains per weekday and eliminating Baby Bullet service. However, one-time funds were diverted from other sources and no service cuts were made in 2011.

Baby Bullet stopping patterns (Note: Since Zones 5 and 6 have no Baby Bullet service stops, these zones are omitted for clarity.)
Miles	Zone	Station	Inaugural Service (Note: Renamed to "Pattern A" on Aug 1, 2005, when "Pattern B" stops were added along with ten new Baby Bullet trains. "Pattern A" discontinued effective Apr 10, 2017.) (June 7, 2004)	Pattern A2 (Note: Modification of "Pattern A" effective Apr 10, 2017; adds reverse commute stop at Redwood City to accommodate planned PCEP work. Discontinued March 30, 2021, due to reduced ridership from the COVID-19 pandemic.) (Apr 10, 2017)	Pattern A3 (Note: Modification of "Pattern A2" effective Aug 30, 2021; all trains stop at Redwood City regardless of direction and time of day. "Pattern A3" discontinued effective Sep 21, 2024.) (Aug 30, 2021)	Pattern A4 (Note: Modification of "Pattern A3" effective Sep 23, 2024; all trains stop at South San Francisco, San Mateo, Sunnyvale, and 22nd Street regardless of direction and time of day) (Sep 21, 2024)	Pattern B (Note: "Pattern B" discontinued effective Oct 1, 2012.) (Aug 1, 2005)	Pattern B2 (Note: Modification of "Pattern B" effective Oct 1, 2012; adds reverse commute stop at Palo Alto so all Baby Bullets stop at Palo Alto, regardless of direction or pattern) (Oct 1, 2012)	Pattern B3 (Note: Modification of "Pattern B2" effective Apr 10, 2017; adds stop at Tamien in the mornings for reverse commute (southbound trains). Discontinued March 30, 2021, due to reduced ridership from the COVID-19 pandemic.) (Apr 10, 2017)	Weekend (Note: Weekend Baby Bullet trains terminate & originate at Bayshore during tunnel notching work between October 2018 and late spring 2019. Bus bridge provides service to all stops north of Bayshore. Discontinued December 12, 2020, due to reduced ridership from the COVID-19 pandemic.) (Jan 1, 2011)
0.0	1	San Francisco	Stop	Stop	Stop	Stop	Stop	Stop	Stop	Stop
1.9	1	22nd Street	R (Note: Stop for reverse commute only (southbound trains during morning peak hours; northbound trains during afternoon peak hours).)	R	R	Stop	R	R	R	—
5.2	1	Bayshore	—	—	—	—	—	—	—	—
9.3	1	South San Francisco	—	—	—	Stop	—	—	—	—
11.6	1	San Bruno	—	—	—	—	—	—	—	—
13.7	2	Millbrae	Stop	Stop	Stop	Stop	Stop	Stop	Stop	Stop
15.2	2	Broadway (Note: Weekend service only as of 2005.)	—	—	—	—	—	—	—	—
16.3	2	Burlingame	—	—	—	—	—	—	—	—
17.9	2	San Mateo	—	—	—	Stop	T (Note: Stop for traditional commute only (northbound trains during morning peak; southbound trains during afternoon peak).)	T	T	Stop
18.9	2	Hayward Park	—	—	—	—	—	—	—	—
20.3	2	Hillsdale	Stop	Stop	Stop	Stop	—	—	—	Stop
21.9	2	Belmont	—	—	—	—	—	—	—	—
23.2	2	San Carlos	—	—	—	—	—	—	—	—
25.4	2	Redwood City	—	R	Stop	Stop	Stop	Stop	Stop	Stop
28.9	3	Menlo Park	—	—	—	—	R	R	R	—
30.1	3	Palo Alto	Stop	Stop	Stop	Stop	T	Stop	Stop	Stop
30.8	3	Stanford (Note: Limited service, football games only)	—	—	—	—	—	—	—	—
31.8	3	California Avenue	—	—	—	—	—	—	T(PM)	—
34.0	3	San Antonio	—	—	—	—	—	—	—	—
36.1	3	Mountain View	Stop	Stop	Stop	Stop	R	R	R	Stop
38.8	3	Sunnyvale	—	—	—	Stop	T	T	T	Stop
40.8	4	Lawrence	—	—	—	—	—	—	—	—
44.3	4	Santa Clara	—	—	—	—	—	—	—	—
45.7	4	College Park (Note: Limited service intended for students)	—	—	—	—	—	—	—	—
46.9	4	San Jose	Stop	Stop	Stop	Stop	Stop	Stop	Stop	Stop
48.9	4	Tamien	—	—	—	—	T	T	T/R(AM) (Note: Traditional commute stop. Reverse commute stop for mornings only.)	—
Timetable Date		Weekday Baby Bullets	Pattern A Count	Pattern A2 Count	Pattern A3 Count	Pattern A4 Count	Pattern B Count	Pattern B2 Count	Pattern B3 Count	Weekend Count
5 June 2004		10	AM:5; PM:5	—	—	—	—	—	—	—
2 May 2005		12	AM:6; PM:6	—	—	—	—	—	—	—
1 August 2005		24	AM:6; PM:6	—	—	—	AM:6; PM:6	—	—	—
1 January 2011		22	AM:5; PM:5	—	—	—	AM:6; PM:6	—	—	AM:2; PM:2
1 October 2012		22	AM:5; PM:5	—	—	—	—	AM:6; PM:6	—	AM:2; PM:2
10 April 2017		22	—	AM:5; PM:5	—	—	—	PM:6	AM:6	AM:2; PM:2
30 August 2021		12	—	—	AM: 6 PM: 6	—	—	—	—	—
21 September 2024		14	—	—	—	AM: 6 PM: 8	—	—	—	—
Notes

In 2005, Caltrain expanded Baby Bullet service by adding two trains per weekday in May, and twelve more trains per weekday in August, for a total of twenty-four Baby Bullet trains per weekday; the August schedule revision added express stops for certain "Pattern B" trains at San Mateo, Redwood City, Menlo Park, Sunnyvale, and Tamien. With this expansion, though, weekday service to the holdout-rule stations at Broadway and Atherton was dropped, the sparse weekday service to Paul Avenue was suspended entirely, and other trains operating during commute hours were changed from local-service, all-stop to limited service, skipping stops either between San Francisco and Redwood City, or between Redwood City and San Jose; Redwood City became a major transfer point for riders.

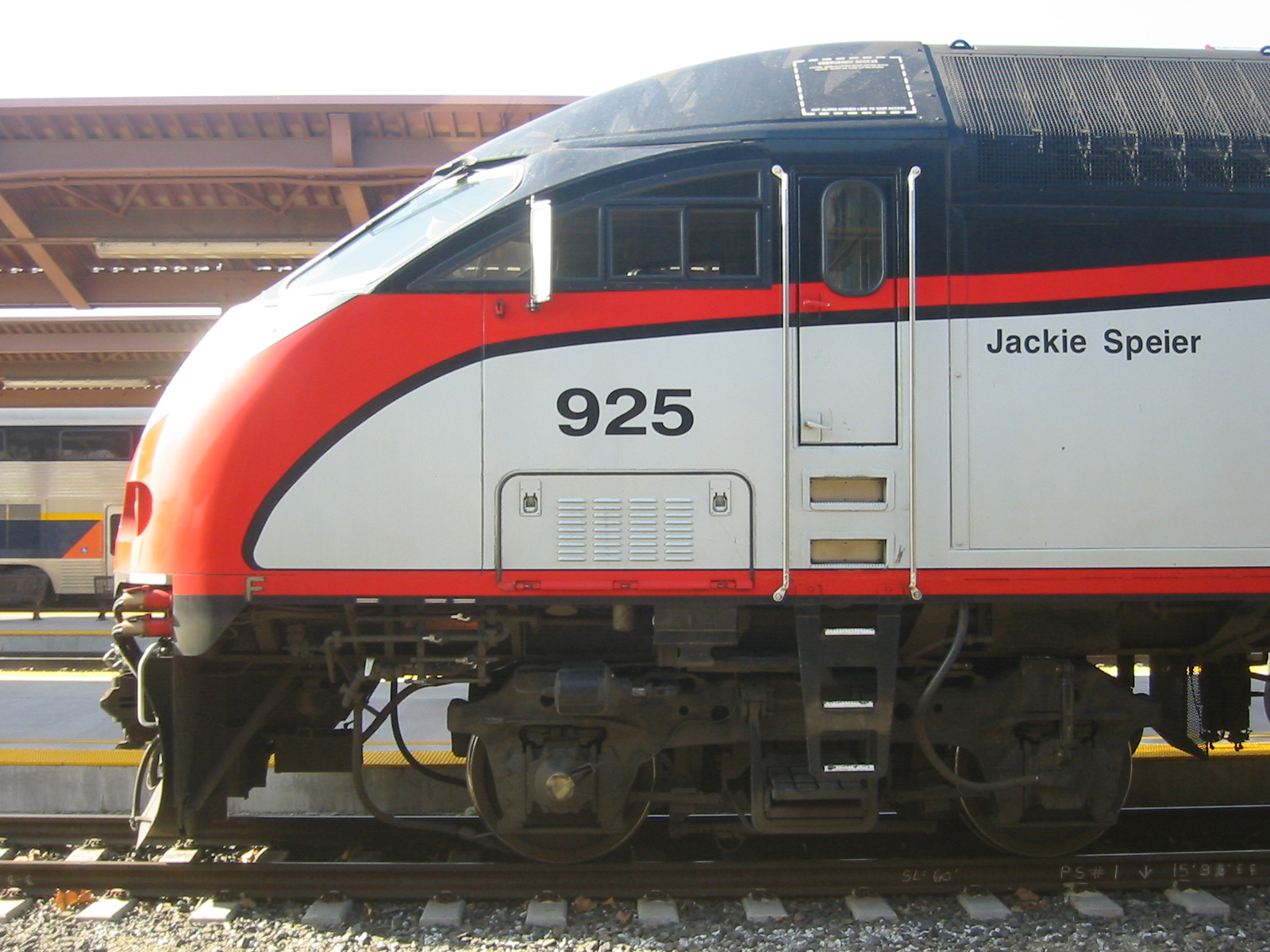
MPI locomotive JPBX#925 is named for Jackie Speier.

In 2011, Caltrain added Baby Bullet service to weekend schedules. There were four weekend/holiday Baby Bullets per day (two in the mornings and two in the evenings), each making seven intermediate stops between 4th&King and Diridon: Millbrae, San Mateo, Hillsdale, Redwood City, Palo Alto, Mountain View, and Sunnyvale; these stations were selected for their proximity to activities as probable leisure time destinations.

Caltrain modified Pattern B trains to add a reverse-commute stop at Palo Alto in October 2012. With this change, all Baby Bullet trains stop at Palo Alto, regardless of pattern or direction. Caltrain shifted to a modified Pattern A on April 10, 2017, which added a reverse-commute stop at Redwood City. The revised schedule also extended service to Tamien for reverse-commute (southbound) Pattern B trains in the morning and California Ave for peak-direction (southbound) Pattern B trains in the afternoon.

Caltrain service on weekends north of Bayshore was suspended and replaced by a bus bridge from October 2018 to March 2019 in order to accommodate tunnel notching work for the Peninsula Corridor Electrification Project. Weekend Baby Bullet trains originated and terminated at Bayshore, and a bus bridge made stops at both stations in San Francisco.

In response to the COVID-19 pandemic and loss of passenger traffic, Caltrain discontinued all weekday Baby Bullet service from Monday, March 30, 2020, to August 27, 2021, and all weekend Baby Bullet service indefinitely, starting December 12, 2020. Weekday Baby Bullet service was restored on August 30, 2021, with twelve trains total: six northbound and six southbound, with three each during peak morning and afternoon commute hours.

Effective September 21, 2024 with the transition to full electric service between San Francisco and San Jose, Baby Bullet service was discontinued and rebranded as the "Express" service. 14 Express trains run each weekday, 3 per direction during peak morning commute hours and 4 per direction during peak afternoon commute hours. Express trains make nine stops between San Francisco 4th & King and San Jose Diridon: 22nd Street, South San Francisco, Millbrae, San Mateo, Hillsdale, Redwood City, Palo Alto, Mountain View, and Sunnyvale, with a scheduled journey time of 59 minutes. Select Express trains provide timed cross-platform transfers at San Jose Diridon to and from South County Connector diesel trains for continuing service to Gilroy.

=== Rolling stock ===
Caltrain purchased six MPI MP36PH-3C locomotives and seventeen Bombardier BiLevel Coaches to assemble Baby Bullet trains, supplementing the existing fleet of EMD F40PH locomotives and Nippon Sharyo gallery cars, which continued in local and limited-stop service. The prime mover in the MP36PH-3C is an EMD 16-645F3B V-16 diesel, with approximately 15–20% more power than the 16-645E3B in the F40PH, and head-end power is provided by a Caterpillar C-27; Caltrain was the lead customer for the MP36PH-3C. Caltrain unveiled the first of the new locomotives, JPBX #923 in a ceremony held on April 4, 2003, at Burlingame and attended by Senator Speier. The event ended in a round-trip excursion to Redwood City. Locomotive JPBX #925 was dedicated to Senator Speier; her popularity, as evidenced by the named locomotive, was cited as one factor contributing to Lawrence Lessig's decision to withdraw from the special election (where he would have opposed her) to replace Tom Lantos in 2008.

PCJPB purchased the seventeen Bombardier cars (ten coaches and seven cab cars) from Sound Transit, which oversees the Seattle-region Sounder commuter rail service. Sound Transit had ordered thirty-two cars in 1999 to be delivered in 2001 for a planned system expansion, and a combination of events, where the manufacturer completed the cars ahead of schedule and the expansion plans were unexpectedly delayed, left the cars available for Caltrain. The cars made their debut on June 28, 2002, during the groundbreaking ceremony that accompanied the launch of CTX; dignitaries had boarded the low-floor Bombardier cars at South San Francisco and rode up to 4th and King. Bombardier cars entered revenue service in October 2002. During the first year of Baby Bullet service in 2004, the five-car Bombardier consists had a capacity of only sixteen bicycles per train, and carried heavy passenger loads.

As part of the 2024 Caltrain electrification project, Stadler KISS EMUs were introduced on the line. The MP36PH-3C locomotives and BiLevel Coaches remain in service, now exclusively serving the South County Connector between San Jose Diridon and Gilroy.
