= Burlingame station =

Train station in Burlingame, California, U.S.

Burlingame
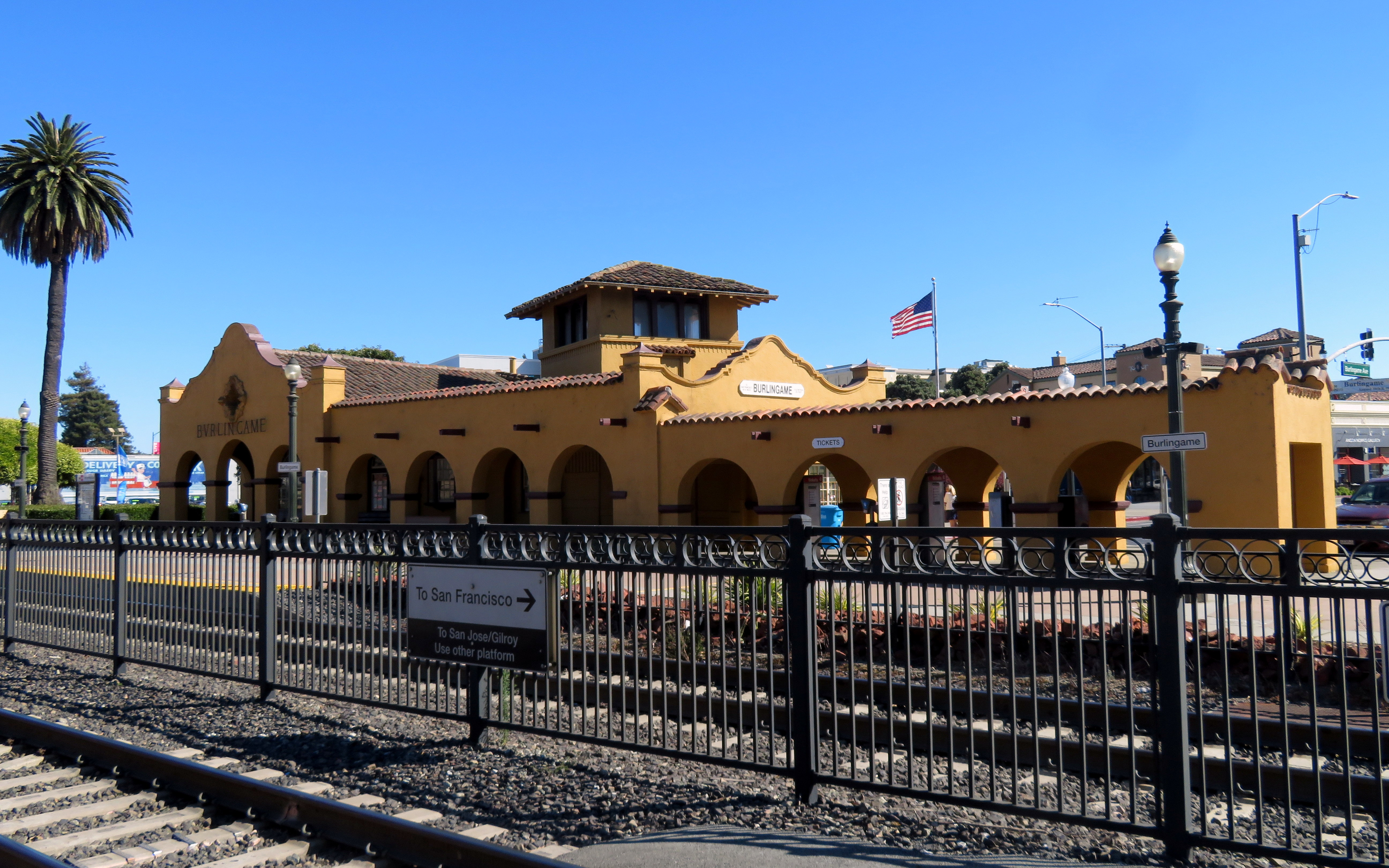
- Burlingame station building in August 2018

General information
- Location: 290 California Drive; Burlingame, California
- Coordinates: 37°34′48″N 122°20′42″W
- Owner: Peninsula Corridor Joint Powers Board
- Line: Peninsula Subdivision
- Platforms: 2 side platforms
- Tracks: 2
- Connections: Burlingame Trolley; SamTrans: ECR, 292, 397

Construction
- Parking: 68 spaces; paid
- Cycle facilities: 13 racks, 18 lockers
- Accessible: Yes

Other information
- Fare zone: 2

History
- Opened: 1894
- Rebuilt: 2008
- Original company: Southern Pacific

Passengers
- FY 2025: 620 (weekday avg.) ▲31%

Services
Preceding station	Caltrain	Following station
Millbrae toward San Francisco	Local	San Mateo toward San Jose Diridon or Tamien
Broadway toward San Francisco	Weekend Local	San Mateo toward San Jose Diridon or Tamien
Limited does not stop here
Express does not stop here
Former services
Preceding station	Caltrain	Following station
Millbrae toward San Francisco	Local (L1)	San Mateo toward San Jose Diridon or Tamien
Broadway toward San Francisco	Weekend Local (L2)	San Mateo toward San Jose Diridon or Tamien
Millbrae toward San Francisco	Limited (L4)	San Mateo toward San Jose Diridon, Tamien or Gilroy
Preceding station	Southern Pacific Railroad	Following station
Millbrae toward San Francisco	Coast Line	San Mateo toward Los Angeles
San Bruno toward San Francisco	Del Monte Until 1971	San Carlos toward Monterey
San Francisco Terminus	Lark Until 1968	Palo Alto toward Los Angeles
- Burlingame Railroad Station
- U.S. National Register of Historic Places
- California Historical Landmark
- Location: Burlingame, California
- Coordinates: 37°34′48″N 122°20′42″W
- Built: 1894
- Architects: Howard, George H., Jr. & Mathisen, J.B.
- Architectural style: Mission Revival—Spanish Colonial Revival
- NRHP reference No.: 78000769
- CHISL No.: 846

Significant dates
- Added to NRHP: April 19, 1978
- Designated CHISL: 1971
Location

Burlingame station is a Caltrain commuter rail station in Burlingame, California. The station building was constructed in the Spanish Colonial Revival and Mission Revival architecture styles in 1894, opening for service on October 10 of that year. 18th-century tiles from the Mission San Antonio de Padua at Jolon and the Mission Dolores Asistencia at San Mateo were used for the station roof.

The station was designated a California Historical Landmark in 1971 and added to the National Register of Historic Places as Burlingame Railroad Station in 1978.

Burlingame has two side platforms serving the line's two tracks. Until 2008, the station had a southbound side platform and a narrow island platform between the tracks — a common configuration at Southern Pacific stations. This required use of the hold-out rule, where only one train could be at the station at a time. The northbound side platform was completed on February 25, 2008, followed by a new southbound platform on April 1, thus eliminating the hold-out rule.

Between 2019 and 2021, a Caltrain deputy director secretly built an apartment inside the station, including a shower and a gym. He was convicted of misuse of public funds in 2025.
