= Capitol station (Caltrain) =

Train station in San Jose, California, U.S.

Capitol
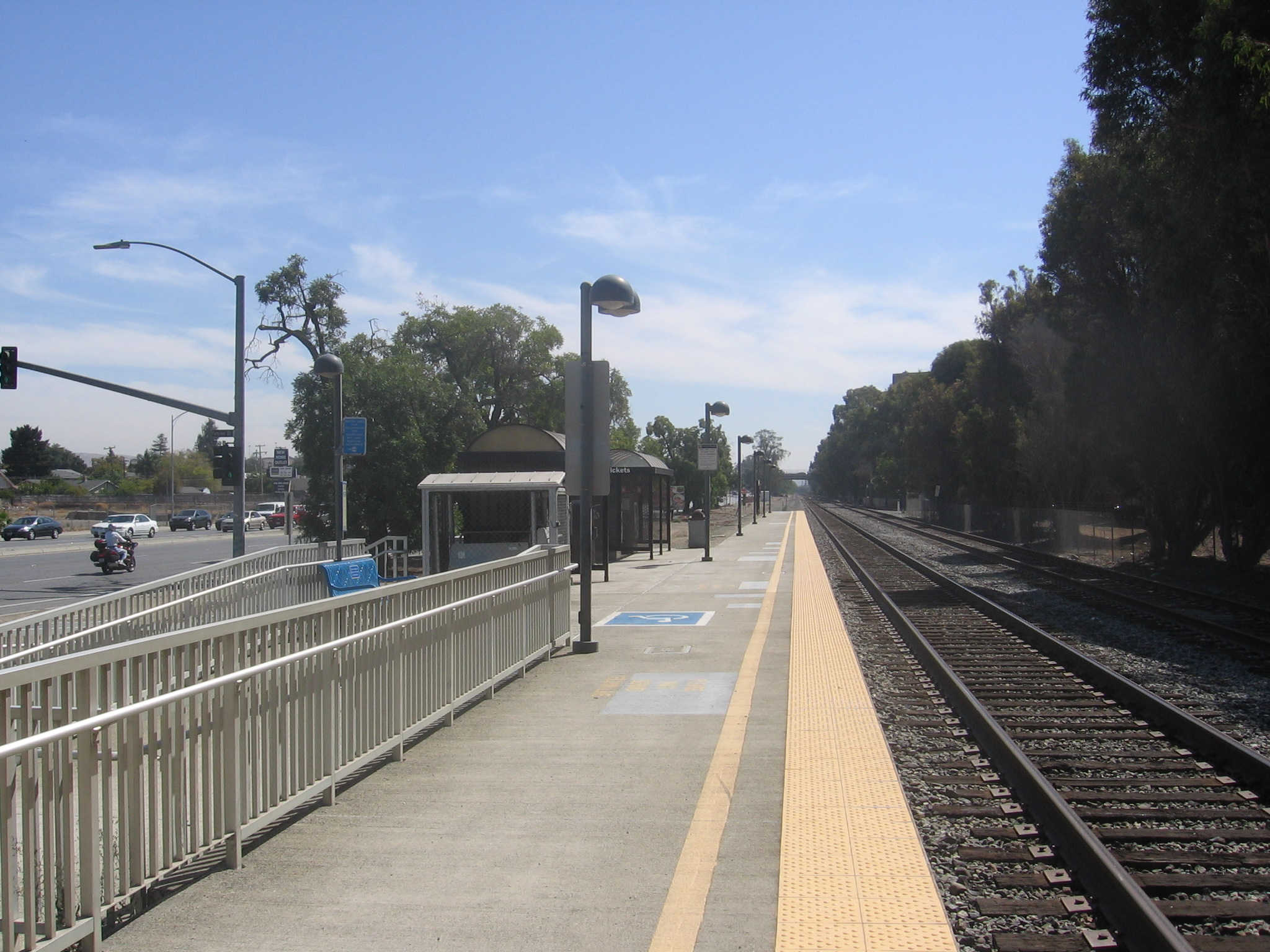
- Capitol station in September 2012

General information
- Location: 3400 Monterey Road; San Jose, California
- Coordinates: 37°17′02″N 121°50′30″W
- Owner: Peninsula Corridor Joint Powers Board
- Line: UP Coast Subdivision
- Platforms: 1 side platform
- Tracks: 2
- Connections: VTA: 66, 68

Construction
- Parking: 379 spaces
- Cycle facilities: 12 racks and 24 lockers
- Accessible: Yes

Other information
- Fare zone: 5

History
- Opened: February 1, 1994

Passengers
- FY 2025: 49 (weekday avg.) ▲29%

Services
| Preceding station | Caltrain | Following station |
|---|---|---|
| Tamien toward San Jose Diridon | South County Connector | Blossom Hill toward Gilroy |
Former services
| Preceding station | Caltrain | Following station |
|---|---|---|
| Tamien toward San Francisco | Limited (L3) Select peak-hour trains only | Blossom Hill toward Gilroy |
| Tamien toward San Francisco | Limited (L4) Select peak-hour trains only | Blossom Hill toward Gilroy |
Location

Capitol station is a Caltrain station located off Monterey Road near the Capitol Expressway, after which the station is named, in southern San Jose, California. The station is only served during weekday peak hours, with northbound trains in the morning and southbound trains in the evening. Service between San Jose and Gilroy, including Capitol station, was increased to four weekday round trips on September 25, 2023.

The Communications Hill residential neighborhood, located just to the west, has no direct pedestrian access to the station. There are plans to construct a pedestrian bridge to link the station to the neighborhood.

== See also ==
- Capitol station (VTA) - VTA light rail station 2 miles (3.2 km) away also named for Capitol Expressway
