= Broadway station (Caltrain) =

Train station in Burlingame, California, U.S.

Broadway
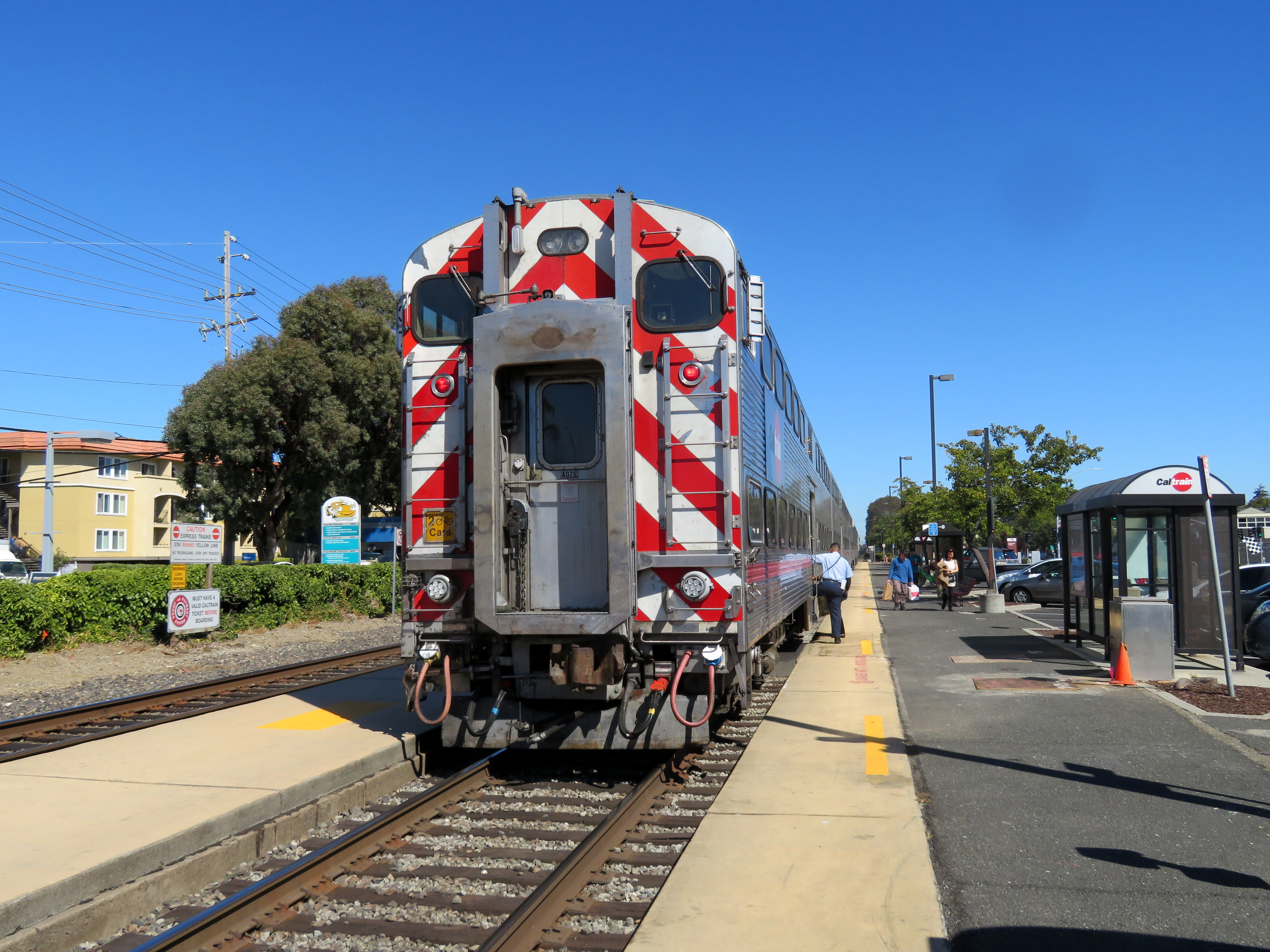
- A southbound train at Broadway station in 2018

General information
- Location: 1190 California Drive; Burlingame, California
- Coordinates: 37°35′14″N 122°21′43″W
- Owner: Peninsula Corridor Joint Powers Board (PCJPB)
- Line: PCJPB Peninsula Subdivision
- Platforms: 1 side platform, 1 island platform
- Tracks: 2
- Connections: Burlingame Trolley; Caltrain: Broadway/Millbrae shuttle SamTrans: 292, 397

Construction
- Parking: 119 spaces; paid
- Cycle facilities: Lockers available
- Accessible: Partial, no wheelchair lift available

Other information
- Status: Weekend service only
- Fare zone: 2

History
- Opened: 1911
- Former names: Buri Buri
- Original company: Southern Pacific

Passengers
- FY 2025: 91 (weekend avg.) ▲112%

Services
Preceding station	Caltrain	Following station
Millbrae toward San Francisco	Weekend Local	Burlingame toward San Jose Diridon or Tamien
Local does not stop here
Limited does not stop here
Express does not stop here
Former services
Preceding station	Caltrain	Following station
Millbrae toward San Francisco	Weekend Local (L2)	Burlingame toward San Jose Diridon or Tamien
Preceding station	Southern Pacific Railroad	Following station
Millbrae toward San Francisco	Coast Line	San Mateo toward Los Angeles
Location

Broadway station is a Caltrain station in Burlingame, California, originally built for the Southern Pacific Railroad in 1911. Since 2005, Caltrain only serves the stop on weekends and holidays; weekday service is provided by a bus shuttle to nearby Millbrae station. A planned grade separation project for the nearby level crossing at Broadway is scheduled to open by the end of 2028, alleviating street congestion and allowing weekday service to be restored.

== History ==
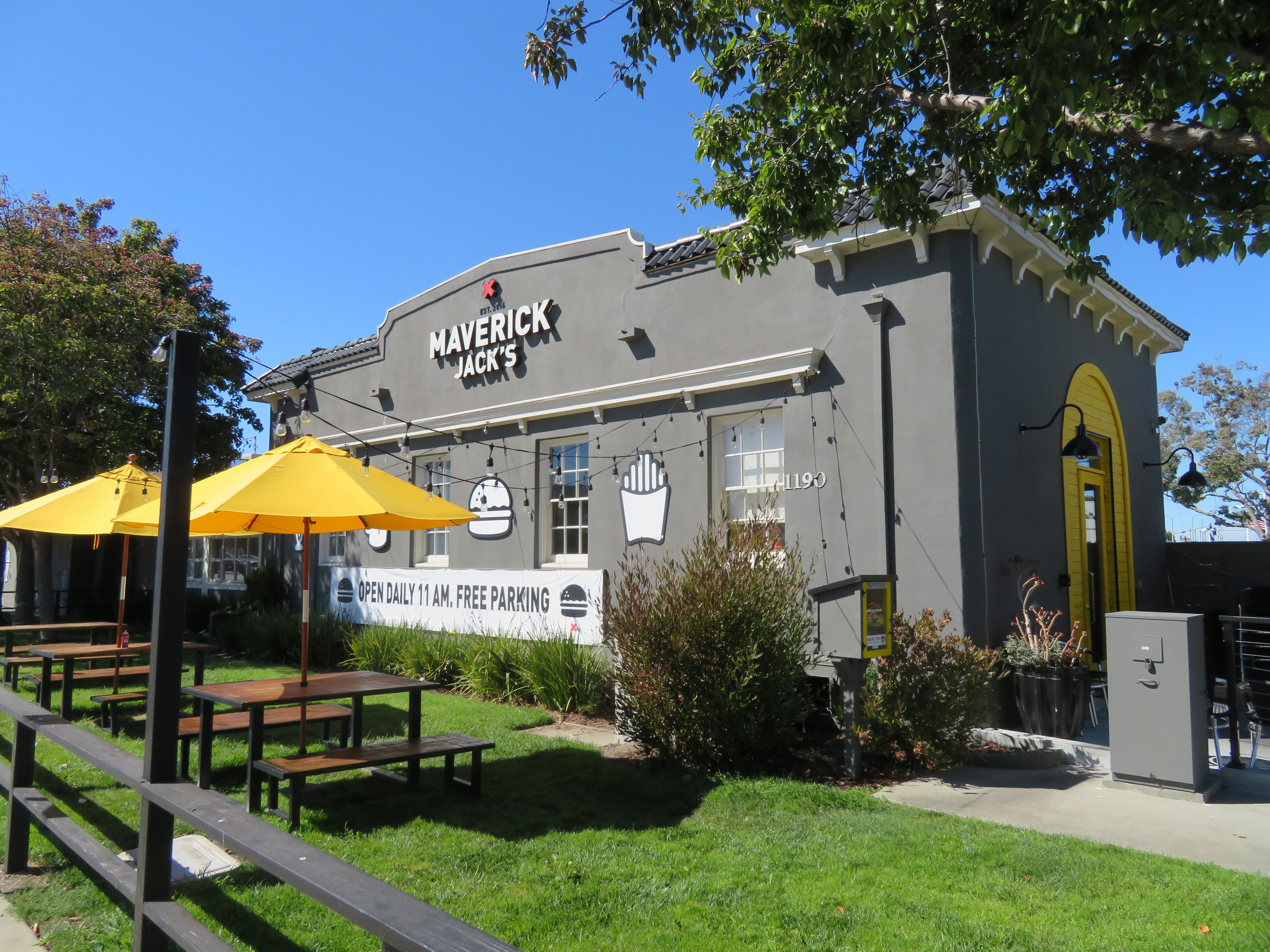
The former station building in 2018, now a restaurant

A station in north Burlingame was opened around 1911, and renamed to Buri Buri in 1917, then Broadway in 1926. The former Southern Pacific Railroad depot building at Broadway still stands and used as a restaurant. A lightly-used station at nearby Easton (which existed as a separate town from 1906 to 1910) was in service until at least 1925. The San Francisco Municipal Railway 40 San Mateo interurban, originally operated by United Railroads of San Francisco, served passengers at the station from their line on what became California Drive until the service ceased in 1949.

Like most stations on the corridor, the Southern Pacific built Broadway with a side platform on the west track for southbound trains, and a narrow island platform between the tracks for northbound trains. Because of the narrow center platform for northbound passengers, a hold-out rule is in effect at the station: if a train is stopped for passengers, an approaching train in the opposite direction on the other track must wait outside the station. The resulting delays were the main reason that Broadway became a weekend-only station on August 1, 2005, shortly after the Caltrain Express project was completed. A free shuttle to Millbrae station was implemented in lieu of weekday service. The station will need to be rebuilt with wider platforms as part of the Broadway grade separation project before weekday service can be restored.

=== Grade separation ===
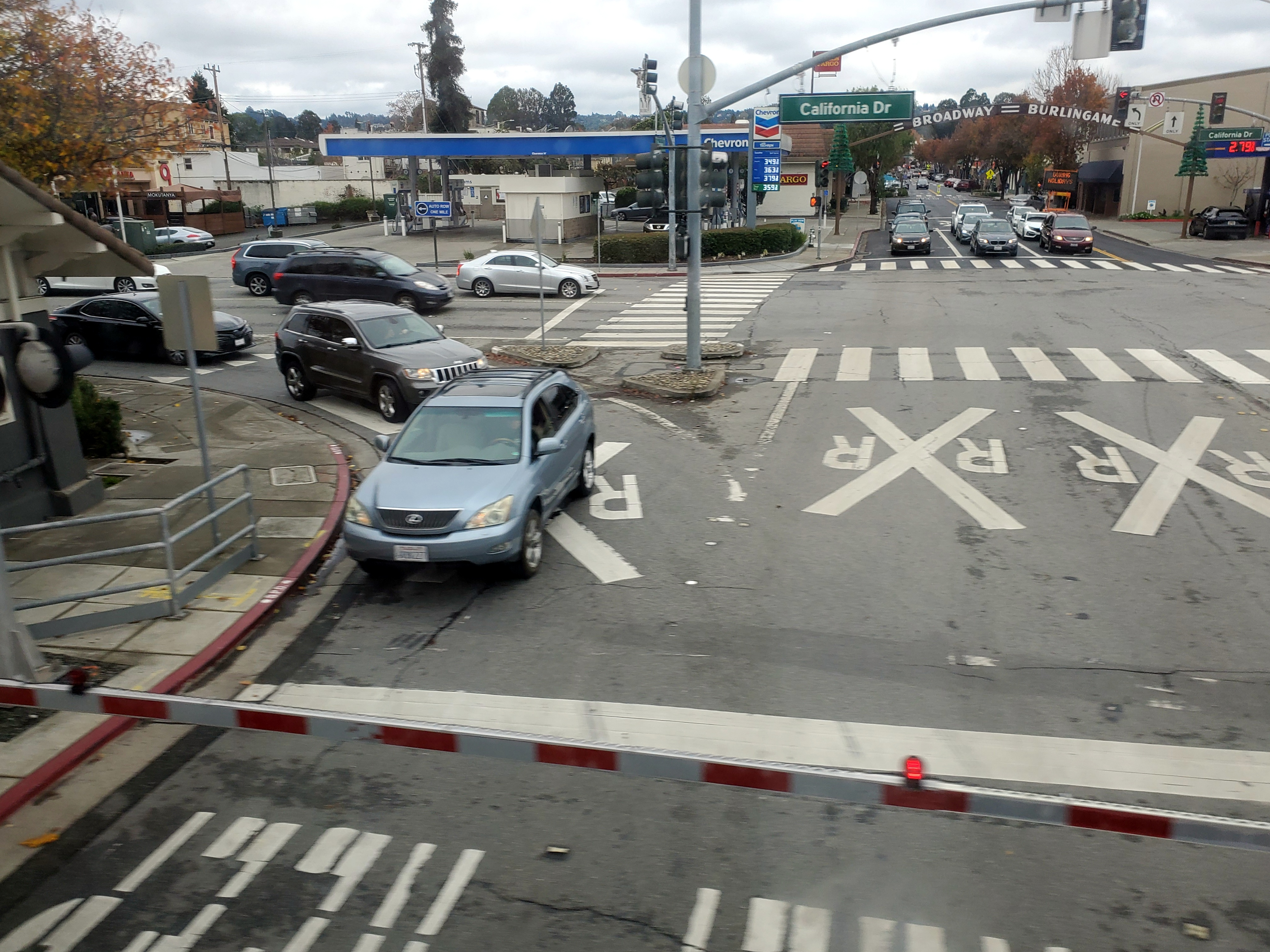
The Broadway level crossing viewed from a passing train

The nearby level grade crossing at Broadway Avenue is planned to be grade-separated, with construction projected to start as early as 2025 if funding can be identified. The at-grade crossing has been identified as the second-most necessary grade separation among 10,000 at-grade crossings in California because it handles 70,000 vehicles per day, and city officials state it is the site of the worst traffic congestion in Burlingame. Grade separation is projected to cost $250 million.

Plans for a grade separation started in 1965 when the Peninsula Commute was being operated by the Southern Pacific Railroad, but were stymied by the complex geometry of Broadway, which intersects with roads immediately east (Carolan) and west (California) of the level crossing, and (further east) passes over U.S. 101 at an interchange rebuilt in 2017, and the heavy rail traffic, projected at more than 114 trains per day by 2020. Traffic through the actual grade crossing was estimated at 27,000 vehicles per day in 2015. There are an average of two accidents and 105 traffic citations issued each year resulting from traffic stopped on the tracks.

Seven alternatives (including a no-build option preserving the current layout) were studied in the Broadway Grade Separation Project Study Report, which recommended Alternative A, a combination of partially elevating the rail line for 7,300 feet (2,200 m) and partially depressing the roadway for a length of 730 feet (220 m), resulting in acceptable grades of up to 4.8 percent for road traffic and 0.75 percent for rail traffic. Under Alternative A, shoofly tracks would first be constructed east of the existing line and west of Carolan, then rail traffic would be diverted while the existing line was elevated. After the new rail bridge and embankments were completed, rail traffic would shift back to the newly elevated original alignment and Broadway would be temporarily closed while being reconstructed at a depressed alignment. Alternatives with the rail line lowered were considered, but they were rejected because of the high cost of drainage due to three nearby creeks.

Broadway station would be rebuilt with an island platform to remove the existing hold-out rule. A preliminary design for the grade separation and station rebuild was anticipated for Spring 2019, and ultimately completed in October 2020 along with environmental clearance. In an updated design released in 2022, the station profile was raised by 2 ft (0.61 m) and the bridge structure was made thinner, eliminating the need to close Broadway temporarily to lower the roadway. Pedestrian and bicycle undercrossings will be provided at Carmelita, Cadillac, and Toyon/Majilla, all south of the Broadway crossing, with stairs and/or ramps to the island platform at Carmelita and Cadillac; in addition, the structure over Broadway will have additional spans to accommodate foot and bicycle traffic. A mixed-use path will be built from Oak Grove to Broadway between the elevated tracks and California. The construction manager / general contractor contract was awarded to a joint venture between Flatiron and Herzog in April 2024. The project is forecast to finish construction by the end of 2028.
