= San Mateo station =

Train station in San Mateo, California, U.S.

San Mateo
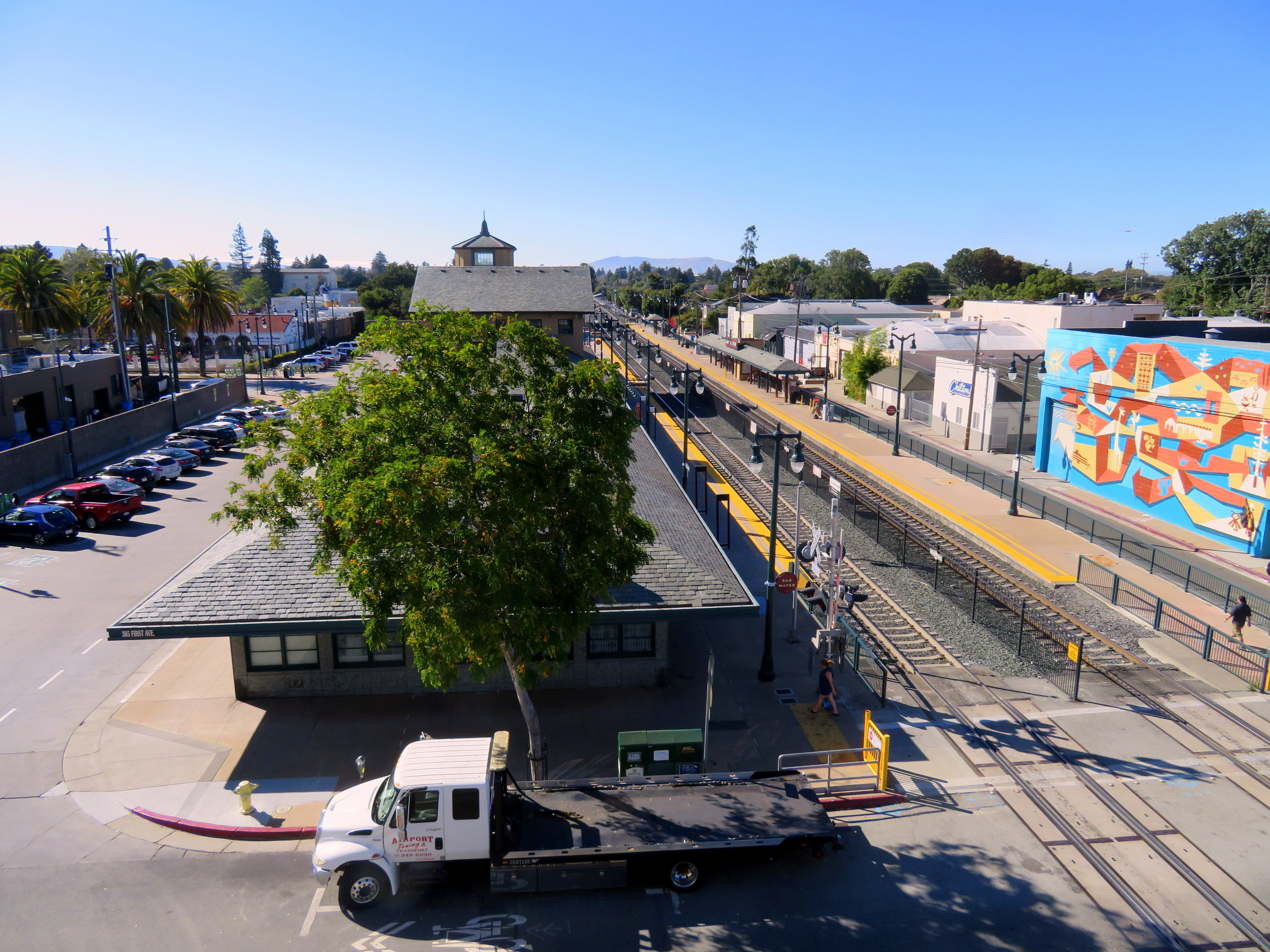
- San Mateo station in August 2018

General information
- Location: 385 First Avenue; San Mateo, California
- Coordinates: 37°34′06″N 122°19′27″W
- Owner: Peninsula Corridor Joint Powers Board (PCJPB)
- Line: PCJPB Peninsula Subdivision
- Platforms: 2 side platforms
- Tracks: 2
- Connections: SamTrans: 250, 292, 295

Construction
- Parking: 42 spaces; paid
- Cycle facilities: 11 racks, lockers
- Accessible: Yes

Other information
- Fare zone: 2

History
- Opened: October 18, 1863
- Rebuilt: 1891, 1975, 2000
- Original company: Southern Pacific

Passengers
- FY 2025: 1,270 (weekday avg.) ▲39%

Services
Preceding station	Caltrain	Following station
Burlingame toward San Francisco	Local	Hayward Park toward San Jose Diridon or Tamien
Millbrae toward San Francisco	Limited	Hillsdale toward San Jose Diridon
Millbrae toward San Francisco	Express	Hillsdale toward San Jose Diridon
Burlingame toward San Francisco	Weekend Local	Hayward Park toward San Jose Diridon or Tamien
Former services
Preceding station	Caltrain	Following station
Burlingame toward San Francisco	Local (L1)	Hayward Park toward San Jose Diridon or Tamien
Burlingame toward San Francisco	Weekend Local (L2)	Hayward Park toward San Jose Diridon or Tamien
Burlingame toward San Francisco	Limited (L4)	San Carlos toward San Jose Diridon, Tamien or Gilroy
Millbrae toward San Francisco	Limited (L5)	Hillsdale toward San Jose Diridon or Tamien
Preceding station	Southern Pacific Railroad	Following station
Broadway toward San Francisco	Coast Line	Hayward Park toward Los Angeles
Location

San Mateo station is a Caltrain station located in San Mateo, California. It is in downtown San Mateo.

== History ==
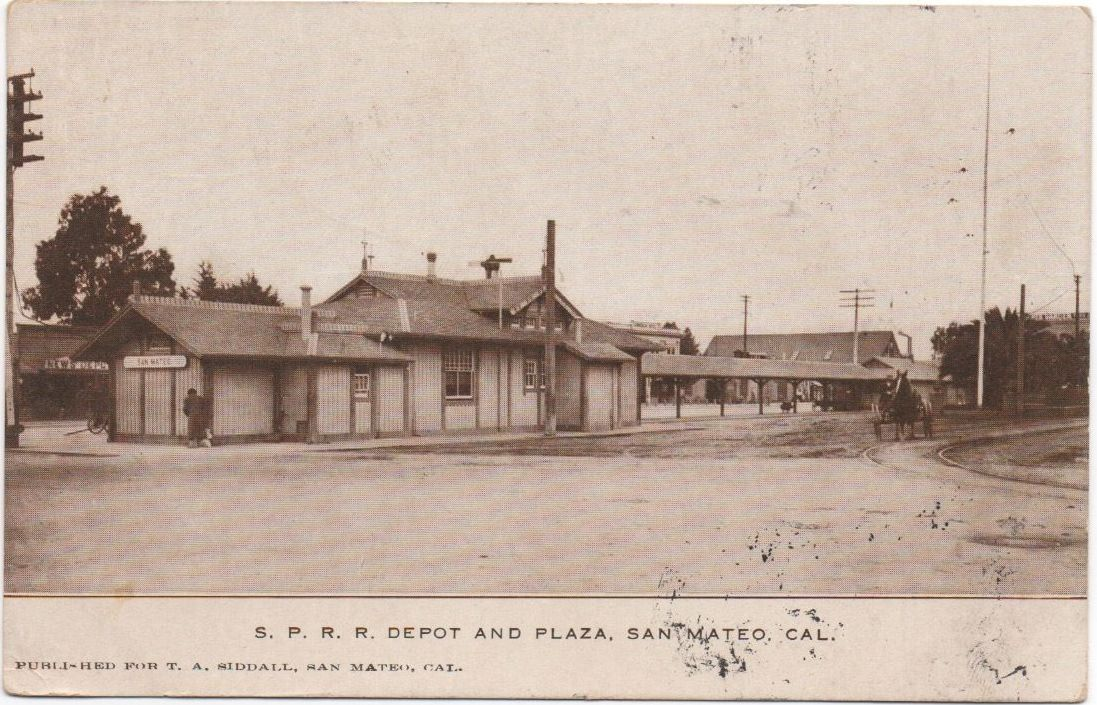
Original station site (c. 1908)

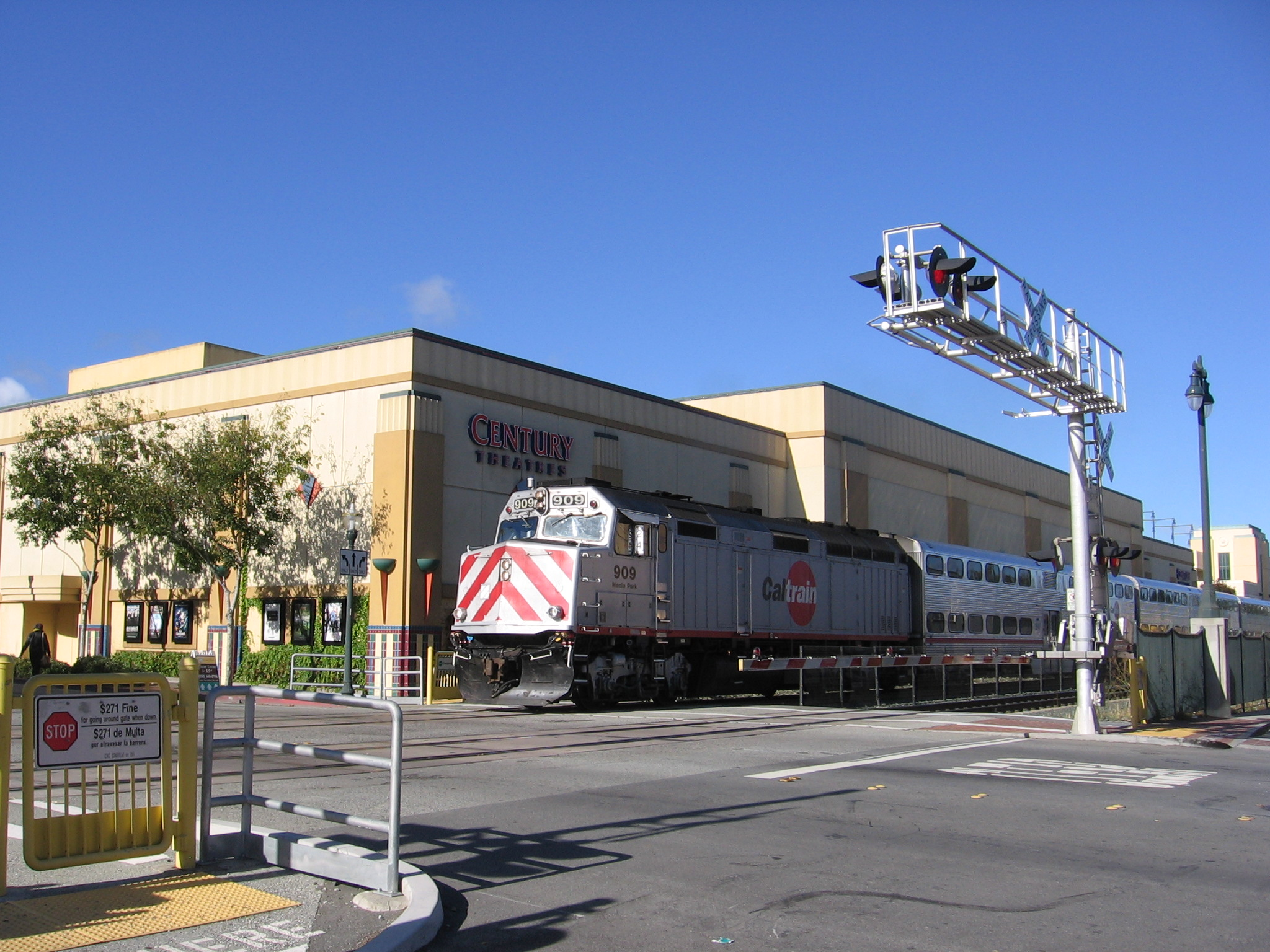
Southbound Caltrain passing the present-day theater, the site of the original 3 stations

San Mateo was an inaugural station along the foundational San Francisco and San Jose Railroad, which commenced service on October 18, 1863. The first three station buildings were all located on the block bounded by 2nd and 3rd Avenues, Main Street, and Railroad Avenue. On June 15, 1883, a "disastrous fire" destroyed San Mateo's Central block, located across the street from the station, but the original 1870s railroad depot itself was saved. Antoine Borel donated a lot in the block destroyed by the fire which become the site of the first public library in San Mateo; that building, named "Library Hall", was destroyed in another fire in April 1887, on the day a meeting was held to organize a fire department, and rebuilt. It later was converted to serve as City Hall and subsequently other city uses.

The original depot building was replaced at the same location in 1891. That depot and Library Hall both sustained damage in the 1906 San Francisco earthquake. In 1925, a third depot building replaced the 1891 structure, again at the same site. The San Francisco Municipal Railway 40 San Mateo interurban line terminated at this station. Today, this site holds a 12-screen cinema, and a mural in its courtyard pays homage to Library Hall.

In 1975, a fourth station opened one block south of the first three, between 3rd and 4th Avenues. Library Hall and the 1925 railroad depot were both subsequently torn down in 1976, and a parking structure was erected on the old site. Trains stopping at this station would block automobile traffic on major downtown streets, since the center boarding platform was between 3rd and 4th. This station was replaced in 2000, following the completion of an $11 million project to relocate the rail stop.

The fifth and current station is sited completely north of 1st Avenue, so vehicular and pedestrian traffic on nearby streets are no longer blocked by trains stopped at its platforms. This incarnation of the San Mateo Station opened in September 2000. A large mural entitled "Mr. Ralston Racing the Train", showing a race between a stagecoach and the train, was painted in 2000 by Nick Motley and "Little" Bobby Duncan under a commission from Eric Pennington on the exterior of an auto body shop at 1st and Railroad, near the south end of the northbound platform. A new mural replaced it in 2016. The replacement, entitled "Good Life", was painted by Brian Barneclo, who also created one of the longest murals in San Francisco near the 4th and King station.

== Bridges ==
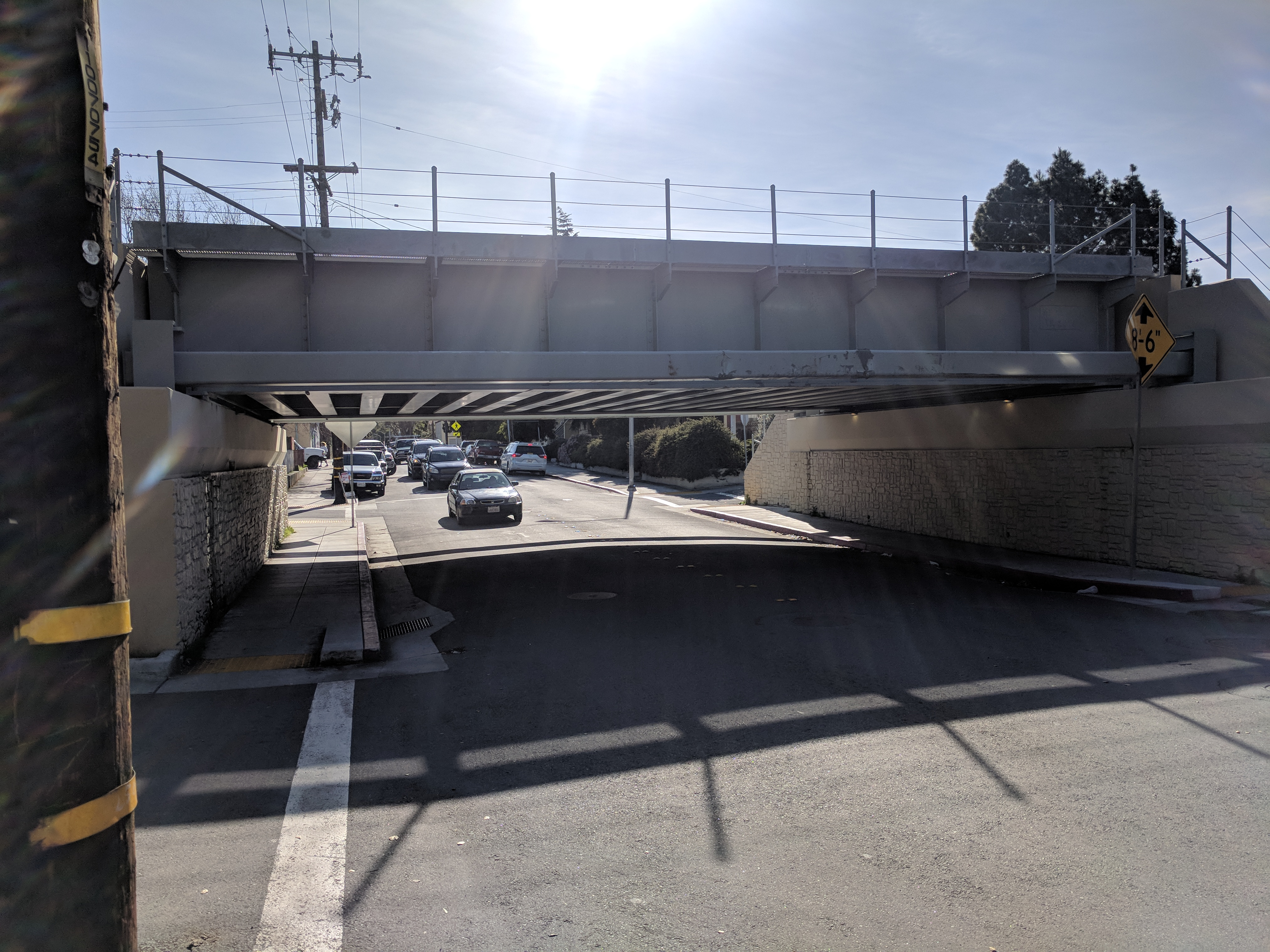
Replacement (2016) bridge over Tilton, 8'6" clearance

Just north of the station are four steel rail bridges crossing (from south to north) Tilton, Monte Diablo, E. Santa Inez, and E. Poplar avenues, the earliest grade separations on the Southern Pacific Coast Line (between San Francisco and Gilroy) and among the earliest grade separations in the entire state. The four rail bridges were built by the American Bridge Company for Southern Pacific in 1903, and sacrificial steel beams were added in 2006 to prevent damage from vehicle strikes. The bridges had low vertical clearances as they predate the prevalence of automobile transport:

- Tilton: 8 ft 6 in (2.59 m)
- Monte Diablo: 11 ft 1 in (3.38 m) Since 2016: 13 ft 2 in (4.01 m)
- Santa Inez: 12 ft 3 in (3.73 m) Since 2016: 15 ft 0 in (4.57 m)
- Poplar: 13 ft (4.0 m) Since 2016: 15 ft 0 in (4.57 m)

Because the original rail bridges did not meet modern seismic safety standards, Caltrain and the City of San Mateo replaced the bridges during a project completed in October 2016. Planning for the bridge replacement started over a decade earlier. Although increasing the vertical clearance below the tracks was studied and was meant to be accomplished by raising tracks up to 4 ft 6 in (1.37 m) over their current elevation, an exemption was granted in 2014 to allow the low clearances at Monte Diablo and Tilton to continue, as raising the clearances at those bridges would also raise the track profile through the San Mateo station, requiring the platforms to be rebuilt. Lowering the roadways was not possible due to interference with subsurface utilities. The underpass at Tilton remains at 8 ft 6 in (2.59 m) of vertical clearance, more than 3 feet (0.91 m) less than the 11 foot 8 Bridge in North Carolina.
