= Blossom Hill station (Caltrain) =

Train station in San Jose, California, U.S.

Blossom Hill
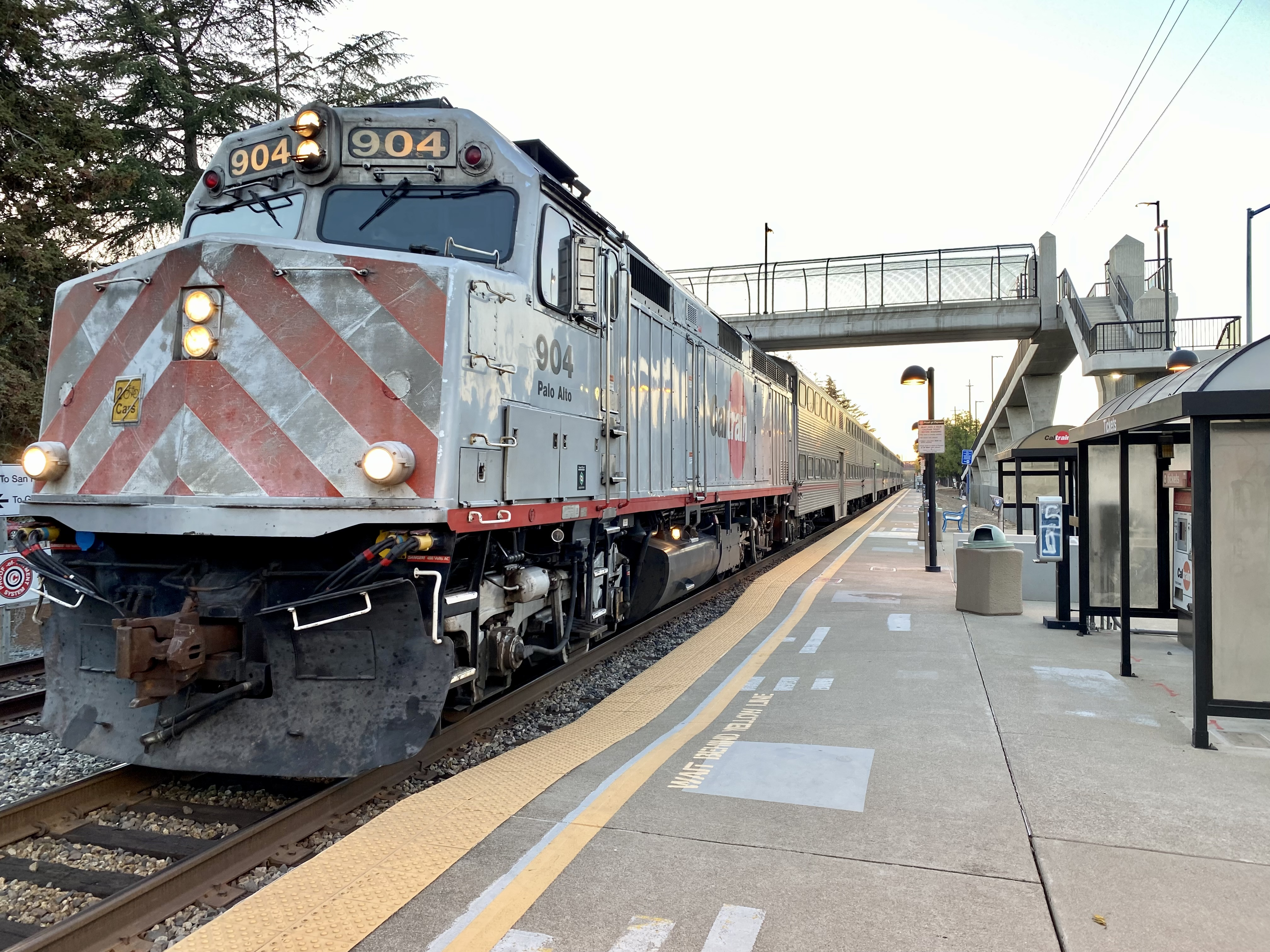
- A train at Blossom Hill station in October 2022

General information
- Location: 5560 Monterey Road; San Jose, California
- Coordinates: 37°17′02″N 121°50′30″W
- Owner: Peninsula Corridor Joint Powers Board
- Line: UP Coast Subdivision
- Platforms: 1 side platform
- Tracks: 2
- Connections: VTA: Rapid 568

Construction
- Parking: 425 spaces
- Cycle facilities: 10 racks and 10 lockers
- Accessible: Yes

Other information
- Fare zone: 5

History
- Opened: July 1, 1992

Passengers
- FY 2025: 71 (weekday avg.) ▲25%

Services
Preceding station	Caltrain	Following station
Capitol toward San Jose Diridon	South County Connector	Morgan Hill toward Gilroy
Former services
Preceding station	Caltrain	Following station
Capitol toward San Francisco	Limited (L3) Select peak-hour trains only	Morgan Hill toward Gilroy
Capitol toward San Francisco	Limited (L4) Select peak-hour trains only	Morgan Hill toward Gilroy
Location

Blossom Hill station is a Caltrain station located off Monterey Road near the Blossom Hill Road expressway in San Jose, California. The station is only served during weekday peak hours, with northbound trains in the morning and southbound trains in the evening.

Blossom Hill station has a single side platform serving one of the two tracks of the Union Pacific Railroad Coast Subdivision.

A footbridge crosses the tracks at the station allowing pedestrians to access both Monterey Road and Great Oaks Parkway. The bridge, opened on September 28, 2012, was named Xander's Crossing after two-year-old Alexander Arriaga, who was killed crossing the tracks in the area in 2005. Service between San Jose and Gilroy, including Blossom Hill station, was increased to four weekday round trips on September 25, 2023.
