= San Benito County Transit =

Transportation in California, United States

San Benito County Express
- Parent: Council of San Benito County Governments (SBCOG)
- Founded: 1975 / 1990
- Headquarters: 330 Tres Pinos Rd Ste C7
- Locale: Hollister, CA
- Service type: Bus service, Dial-a-Ride
- Routes: 3
- Annual ridership: 31,487 (2021)
- Website: Official website

The San Benito County Local Transportation Authority (LTA) is the public transportation agency of San Benito County, California, immediately south of Silicon Valley (Santa Clara County). LTA provides fixed route inter-county and intra-city service as San Benito County Express; the Intracounty routes connect destinations in Hollister and San Juan Bautista to Gilroy in Santa Clara County, while the Tripper routes connect destinations within Hollister. LTA also provides demand-responsive dial-a-ride service within selected areas of northern San Benito County as County Express On-Demand.

== History ==
The first public transit agency in San Benito County was named San Tran, which was operated by the City of Hollister from March 1975 to March 1990. In June 1990, the San Benito County Local Transportation Authority (LTA) was created as a joint powers agency by the county and the two incorporated cities, Hollister and San Juan Bautista.

== Transportation Services ==
Bus service is exclusive to northern San Benito County, where the LTA operates and administers County Express, providing fixed-route local bus service in the city of Hollister; regional fixed-route bus service between Hollister, San Juan Bautista, and Gilroy; and dial-a-ride service in northern San Benito County.

=== Fixed routes ===
County Express offers Intercounty routes that connect Hollister and San Juan Bautista to Gilroy, where riders may transfer to Caltrain, Santa Clara Valley Transportation Authority, Monterey-Salinas Transit, or Greyhound Buses. The traditional commute direction is north to Gilroy; buses depart from Vets Park in Hollister, traveling through downtown Hollister along California State Route 156 to San Juan Bautista, stopping at Abbe Park and Anzar High School, then continuing north along U.S. 101 to Gilroy. At Gilroy, one of three terminal stops is made:

1. Caltrain service during peak weekday commute periods, stopping at Gilroy station for Caltrain and VTA transfers.
2. Greyhound service on weekends, stopping at the Greyhound bus depot in Gilroy.
3. Gavilan College service on weekdays, stopping at the main campus of Gavilan College for VTA transfers.

Some weekday trips (Caltrain and Gavilan College service) bypass San Juan Bautista by traveling on SR 25. All trips that stop at Gavilan College continue on to the Caltrain depot.

Local bus service in Hollister is branded as the Tripper, which operates a single loop route that runs anti-clockwise and takes approximately 60 minutes to complete. The Intercounty and Tripper routes share a stop near the Hollister branch campus of Gavilan College, at 4th and San Benito.

Prior to the COVID-19 pandemic in California, intracity fixed routes in Hollister used three color-coded lines: red, green, and blue. The green and blue ran in a loop through Hollister, the green line running clockwise and the blue line running counter-clockwise. The red line operated north–south from the south side of the loop, continuing to its terminus near the City of Hollister Municipal Airport. All three routes started from the same point near Hazel Hawkins Memorial Hospital.

== See also ==
- Amtrak Thruway
- Caltrain
- Coast Starlight
- SCMTD
