= San Martin station =

Train station in San Martin, California, U.S.

San Martin
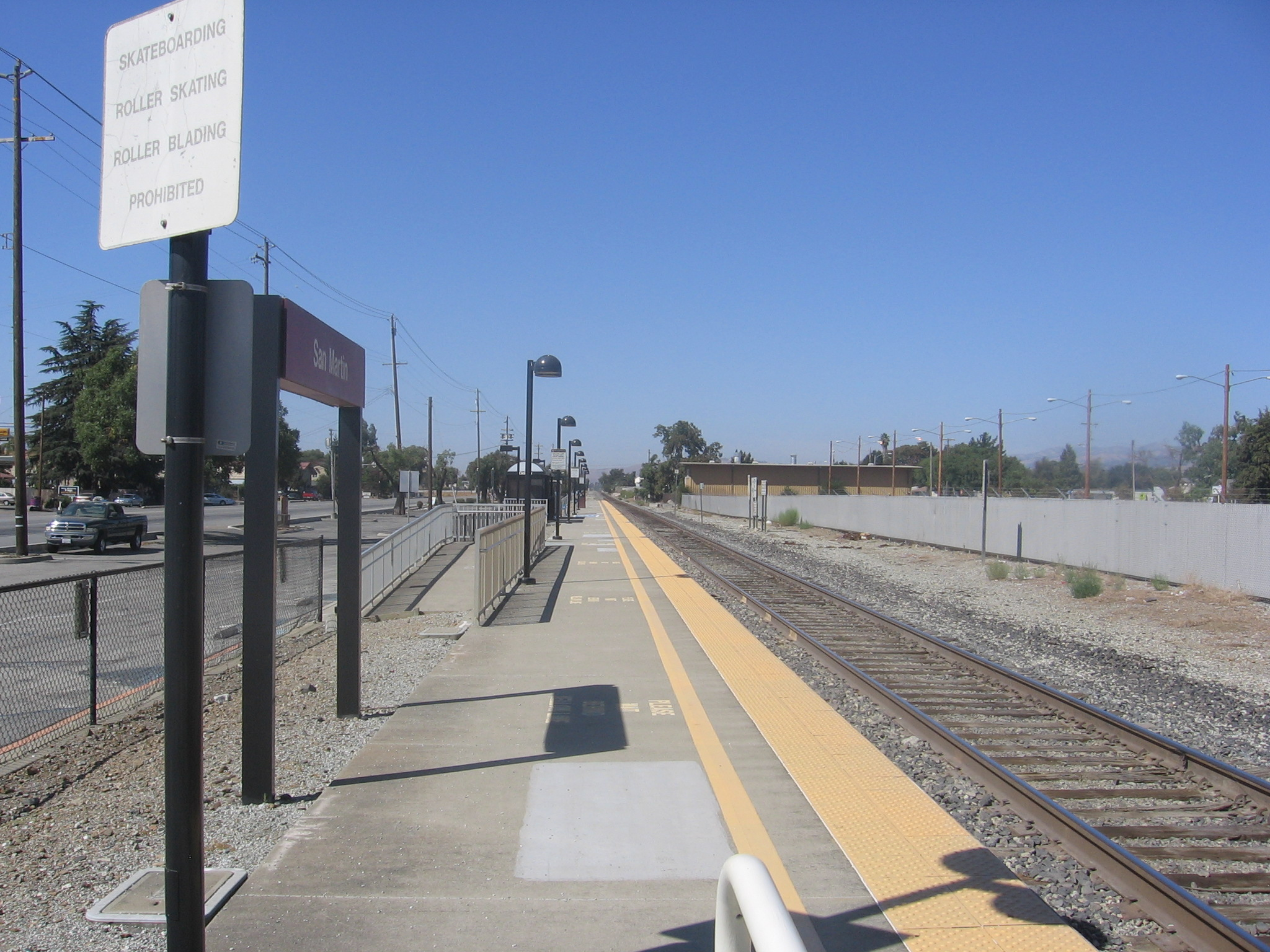
- San Martin station in September 2012

General information
- Location: 13400 Monterey Highway; San Martin, California
- Coordinates: 37°05′09″N 121°36′38″W
- Owner: Peninsula Corridor Joint Powers Board
- Line: UP Coast Subdivision
- Platforms: 1 side platform
- Tracks: 1
- Connections: VTA: 68, Express 121, Rapid 568

Construction
- Parking: 167 spaces
- Accessible: Yes

Other information
- Fare zone: 6

History
- Opened: February 1, 1994

Passengers
- FY 2025: 25 (weekday avg.) ▼14%

Services
Preceding station	Caltrain	Following station
Morgan Hill toward San Jose Diridon	South County Connector	Gilroy Terminus
Former services
Preceding station	Caltrain	Following station
Morgan Hill toward San Francisco	Limited (L3) Select peak-hour trains only	Gilroy Terminus
Morgan Hill toward San Francisco	Limited (L4) Select peak-hour trains only	Gilroy Terminus
Preceding station	Southern Pacific Railroad	Following station
Morgan Hill toward San Francisco	Coast Line	Gilroy toward Los Angeles
Location

San Martin station is a Caltrain station located in the downtown area of San Martin, California. The station is only served by South County Connector service during weekday peak hours, with four northbound trains to San Jose in the morning and four southbound trains to Gilroy in the evening.
