= Morgan Hill station =

Train station in Morgan Hill, California, U.S.

Morgan Hill
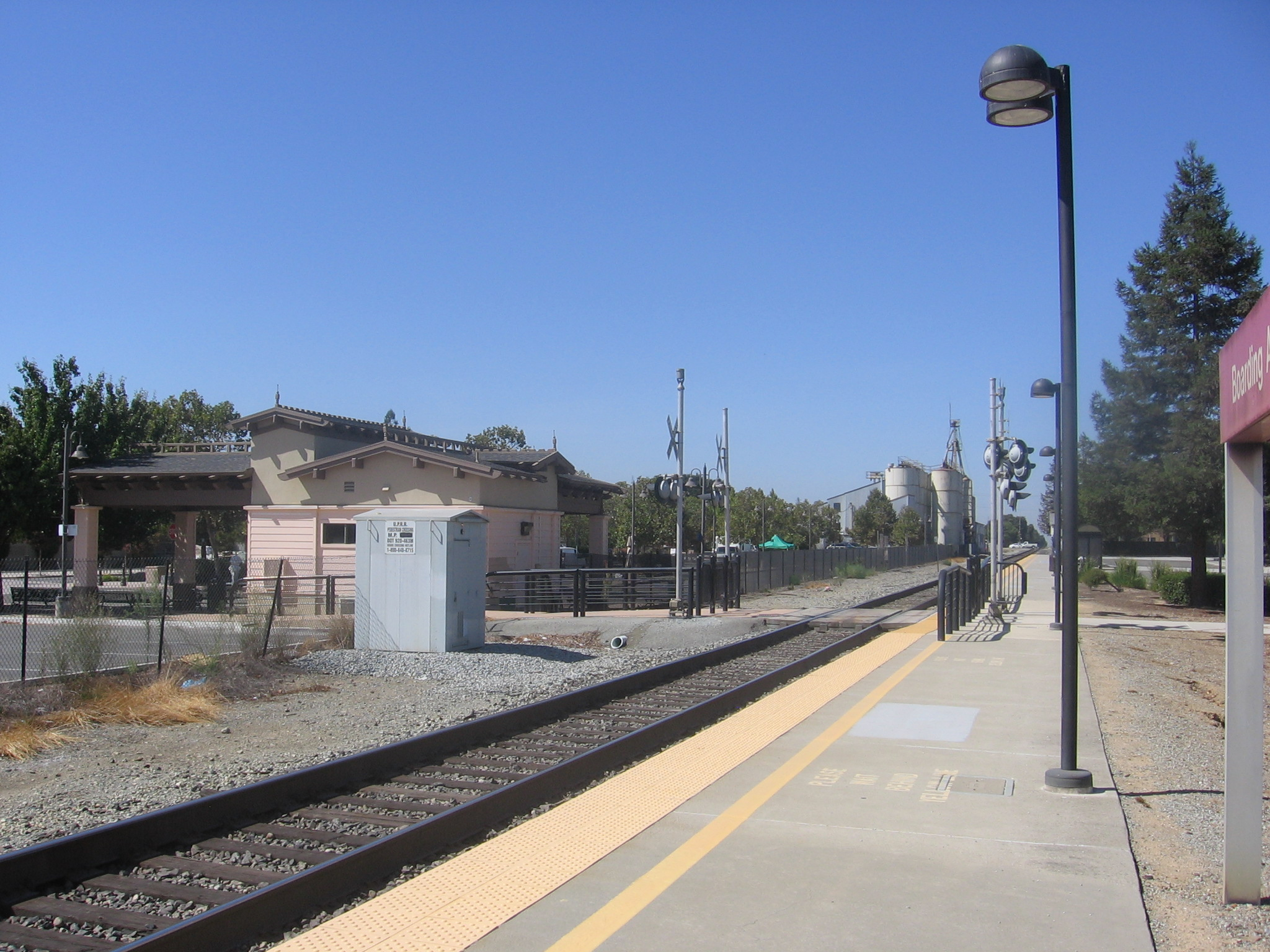
- Morgan Hill station in September 2012

General information
- Location: 17300 Depot Street; Morgan Hill, California
- Coordinates: 37°07′46″N 121°39′02″W
- Owner: Peninsula Corridor Joint Powers Board
- Line: UP Coast Subdivision
- Platforms: 1 side platform
- Tracks: 1
- Connections: VTA: 68, 87, Express 121, Rapid 568

Construction
- Parking: 486 spaces
- Cycle facilities: 12 racks and 30 lockers
- Accessible: Yes

Other information
- Station code: Amtrak: MHC
- Fare zone: 6

History
- Opened: 1899 (SP); July 1, 1992 (Caltrain)
- Closed: November 1958
- Original company: Southern Pacific

Passengers
- FY 2025: 130 (weekday avg.) ▲30%

Services
Preceding station	Caltrain	Following station
Blossom Hill toward San Jose Diridon	South County Connector	San Martin toward Gilroy
Former services
Preceding station	Caltrain	Following station
Blossom Hill toward San Francisco	Limited (L3) Select peak-hour trains only	San Martin toward Gilroy
Blossom Hill toward San Francisco	Limited (L4) Select peak-hour trains only	San Martin toward Gilroy
Preceding station	Southern Pacific Railroad	Following station
Tamien toward San Francisco	Coast Line	San Martin toward Los Angeles
Future services
Preceding station	Amtrak	Following station
Tamien toward Auburn	Capitol Corridor	Gilroy toward Salinas
Coast Starlight does not stop here
Location

Morgan Hill station is a Caltrain station located in the downtown area of Morgan Hill, California. The station is only served during weekday peak hours, with northbound trains in the morning and southbound trains in the evening.

The original Southern Pacific station opened in 1899 as Morganhill. The railroad closed the station in November 1958. VTA rebuilt the station for an extension to Caltrain in 1992. Service between San Jose and Gilroy, including Morgan Hill station, was increased to four weekday round trips on September 25, 2023.

The station will eventually be served by Amtrak when the Capitol Corridor is extended to Salinas Intermodal Transportation Center.
