= Hayward Park station =

Train station in San Mateo, California, U.S.

Hayward Park
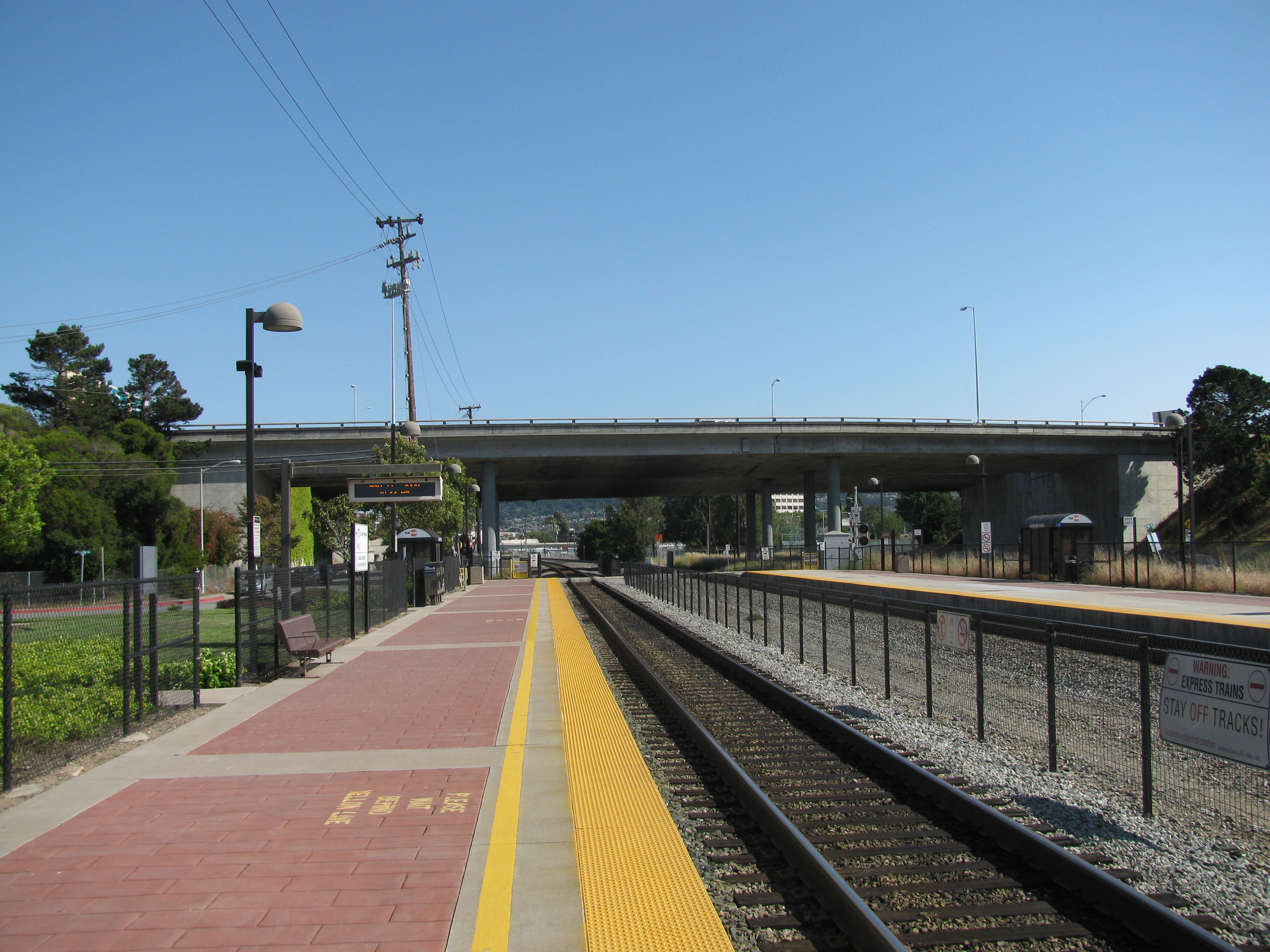
- Hayward Park station platform in 2009

General information
- Location: 401 Concar Drive; San Mateo, California
- Coordinates: 37°33′12″N 122°18′34″W
- Owner: Peninsula Corridor Joint Powers Board (PCJPB)
- Line: PCJPB Peninsula Subdivision
- Platforms: 2 side platforms
- Tracks: 2
- Connections: Commute.org shuttle: Norfolk; SamTrans: ECR, 292, 397

Construction
- Parking: 213 spaces; paid
- Cycle facilities: 18 racks, lockers
- Accessible: Yes

Other information
- Fare zone: 2

History
- Rebuilt: 1999

Passengers
- FY 2025: 366 (weekday avg.) ▲63%

Services
Preceding station	Caltrain	Following station
San Mateo toward San Francisco	Local	Hillsdale toward San Jose Diridon or Tamien
San Mateo toward San Francisco	Weekend Local	Hillsdale toward San Jose Diridon or Tamien
Limited does not stop here
Express does not stop here
Former services
Preceding station	Caltrain	Following station
San Mateo toward San Francisco	Local (L1)	Hillsdale toward San Jose Diridon or Tamien
San Mateo toward San Francisco	Weekend Local (L2)	Hillsdale toward San Jose Diridon or Tamien
Preceding station	Southern Pacific Railroad	Following station
San Mateo toward San Francisco	Coast Line	Bay Meadows toward Los Angeles
Location

Hayward Park station is one of three Caltrain stations in San Mateo, California. It is located just to the north of the State Route 92 overcrossing, about 1,200 ft (370 m) south of the site of the original Southern Pacific station in Hayward Park (known as Leslie Station prior to 1936). It was relocated in 1999 because of a lack of parking at the original site, and because the previous station had been sited along a curve in the tracks near 16th Avenue. The present station has two side platforms, with at-grade signalized and gate-protected pedestrian/bicycle crossings of the tracks at both its north and south ends.

This station is planned to be modified to accommodate through-running California High-Speed Rail service.
