= Gilroy station =

Train station in Gilroy, California, U.S.

Gilroy
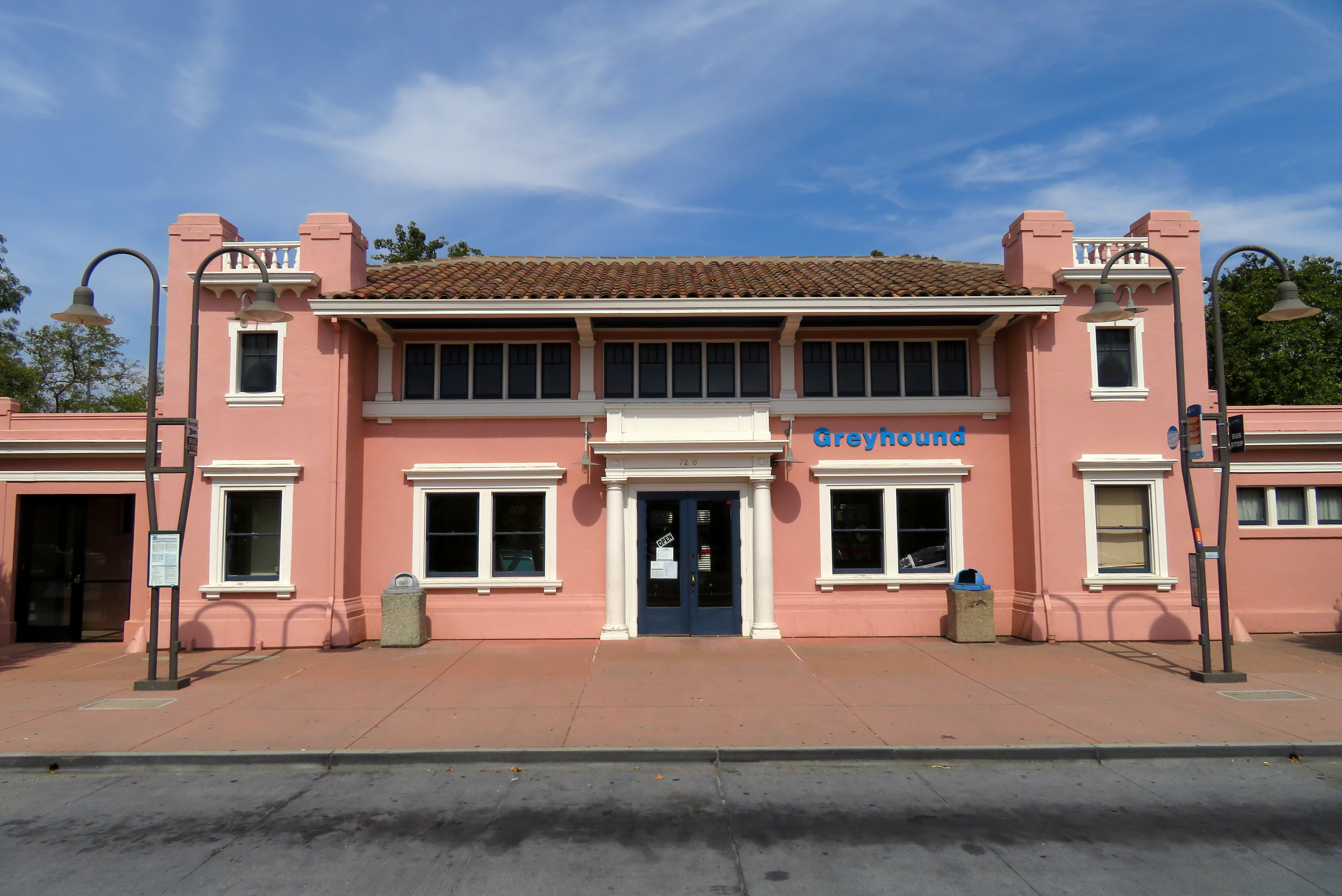
- Gilroy station in July 2018

General information
- Location: 7150 Monterey Street; Gilroy, California
- Coordinates: 37°00′15″N 121°34′00″W
- Owner: Peninsula Corridor Joint Powers Board
- Line: UP Coast Subdivision
- Platforms: 1 side platform
- Tracks: 1
- Connections: Amtrak Thruway: 40; Greyhound Lines; Monterey-Salinas Transit: 59; San Benito County Transit: Intercounty; VTA: 68, 84, 85, 86, Rapid 568

Construction
- Parking: 471 spaces
- Cycle facilities: 13 racks and 30 lockers
- Accessible: Yes

Other information
- Station code: Amtrak: GLY
- Fare zone: 6

History
- Opened: March 13, 1869; July 1, 1992
- Closed: April 30, 1971
- Rebuilt: 1998
- Original company: Southern Pacific

Passengers
- FY 2025: 110 (weekday avg.) ▲16%

Services
Preceding station	Caltrain	Following station
San Martin toward San Jose Diridon	South County Connector	Terminus
Former services
Preceding station	Caltrain	Following station
San Martin toward San Francisco	Limited (L3) Select peak-hour trains only	Terminus
San Martin toward San Francisco	Limited (L4) Select peak-hour trains only	Terminus
Preceding station	Southern Pacific Railroad	Following station
San Martin toward San Francisco	Coast Line	Sargent toward Los Angeles
Terminus	Gilroy – Tres Pinos	Hollister toward Tres Pinos
Future services
Preceding station	Amtrak	Following station
Morgan Hill toward Auburn	Capitol Corridor	Pajaro/Watsonville toward Salinas
Coast Starlight does not stop here
Preceding station	Caltrain	Following station
San Martin toward San Jose Diridon	South County Connector	Pajaro/Watsonville toward Salinas
Preceding station	California High-Speed Rail	Following station
San José toward San Francisco	Phase 1	Merced Terminus
San José toward San Francisco	Phase 1	Madera toward Anaheim
- Gilroy Southern Pacific Railroad Depot
- U.S. National Register of Historic Places
- NRHP reference No.: 100004192
- Added to NRHP: July 12, 2019
Location

Gilroy station is a Caltrain station located in Gilroy, California, United States. It is the southern terminus of the South County Connector service, and is only served during weekday rush hours in the peak direction, with trains going toward San Jose in the morning and returning southbound in the evening. The station building was constructed by the Southern Pacific Railroad in 1918 and restored in 1998. Future plans call for extended Amtrak Capitol Corridor service, as well as California High-Speed Rail trains, to also stop at Gilroy. The station was named to the National Register of Historic Places in 2019 as Gilroy Southern Pacific Railroad Depot.

== History ==
=== Southern Pacific ===
The first Gilroy station, similar to the depot still extant at Santa Clara, opened on March 13, 1869 under the Santa Clara and Pajaro Valley Railroad. A water tower, turntable, and three-stall engine house were built in 1882.

The original station was replaced with a two-story Italian Renaissance structure — framed with local redwood and covered in cement plaster — in 1918 by the Southern Pacific Railroad. Service reductions began in 1929; the engine house was closed in 1934, though the turntable remained in use through the 1950s. The final service to the station was the Del Monte, which ran until April 30, 1971. Amtrak intercity service, including the Coast Starlight, passed through the station without stopping.

=== Caltrain ===
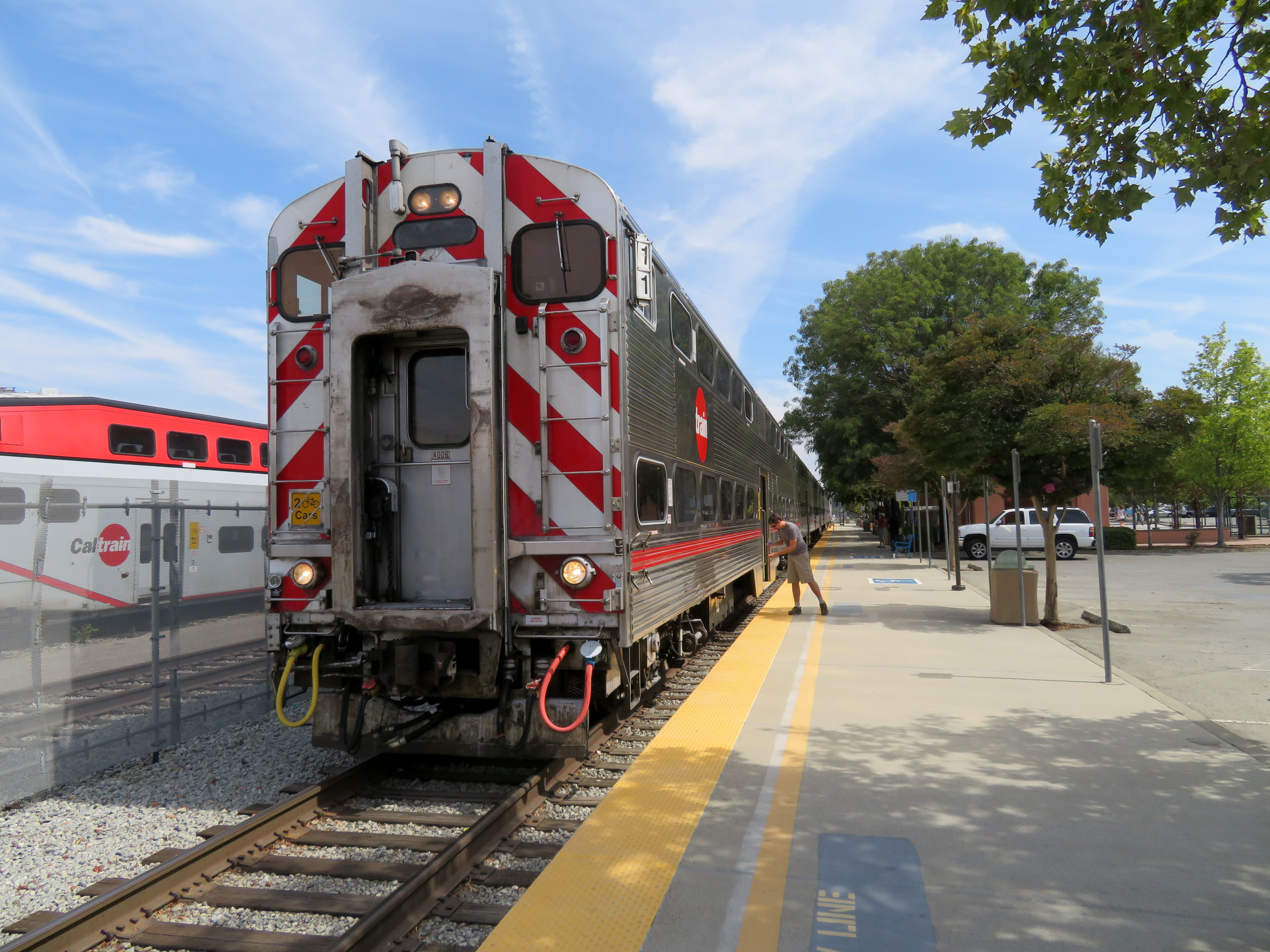
Caltrain at Gilroy in 2018

On July 1, 1992, two daily Caltrain round trips were extended from San Jose Diridon station to Gilroy. This was increased to four daily round trips with the opening of a layover yard adjacent to the station in February 1994. In 1998, the city restored the station building as the centerpiece of the $2.8 million Gilroy Transit Center, which also included parking lots and a bus plaza. One waiting room was reopened for use by Greyhound. In July 2005, Caltrain reduced service to three daily round trips.

Even before 1992, Caltrain operated a special limited-stop train from San Francisco to Gilroy on the weekend of the Gilroy Garlic Festival, with shuttle buses between the station and the festival. This service ended in 2002 when Caltrain temporarily suspended all weekend train service for the CTX project, and was not resumed when weekend service was restored in 2004. The Golden Gate Railroad Museum chartered weekend trains to Gilroy during the festival for a few years, but those charters were later discontinued. The "Garlic Train" resumed service beginning with the 2013 Garlic Festival.

The station was named to the National Register of Historic Places in 2019 as Gilroy Southern Pacific Railroad Depot. Gilroy service was increased to four weekday round trips on September 25, 2023.

=== Future plans ===
The Road Repair and Accountability Act provided funding for an extension of Caltrain service to Salinas Intermodal Transportation Center, followed by Amtrak Capitol Corridor service later. The dead-end platform track at Gilroy station will be extended south to reconnect with the mainline.

The planned California High-Speed Rail system will have a station in Gilroy. Two sites were under consideration: the existing Gilroy station, and a currently undeveloped area northeast of the city center (east of Gilroy Premium Outlets). The High Speed Rail Authority identified an at-grade option at the existing station as their preferred alternative in 2020.

== Bus connections ==
Gilroy station is a hub for local and intercity bus service:

- Greyhound Lines
- San Benito County Transit: Intercounty
- VTA: 68, 84, 85, 86, Express 121, Rapid 568
