= Tamien station =

Train station in San Jose, California, U.S.

Tamien
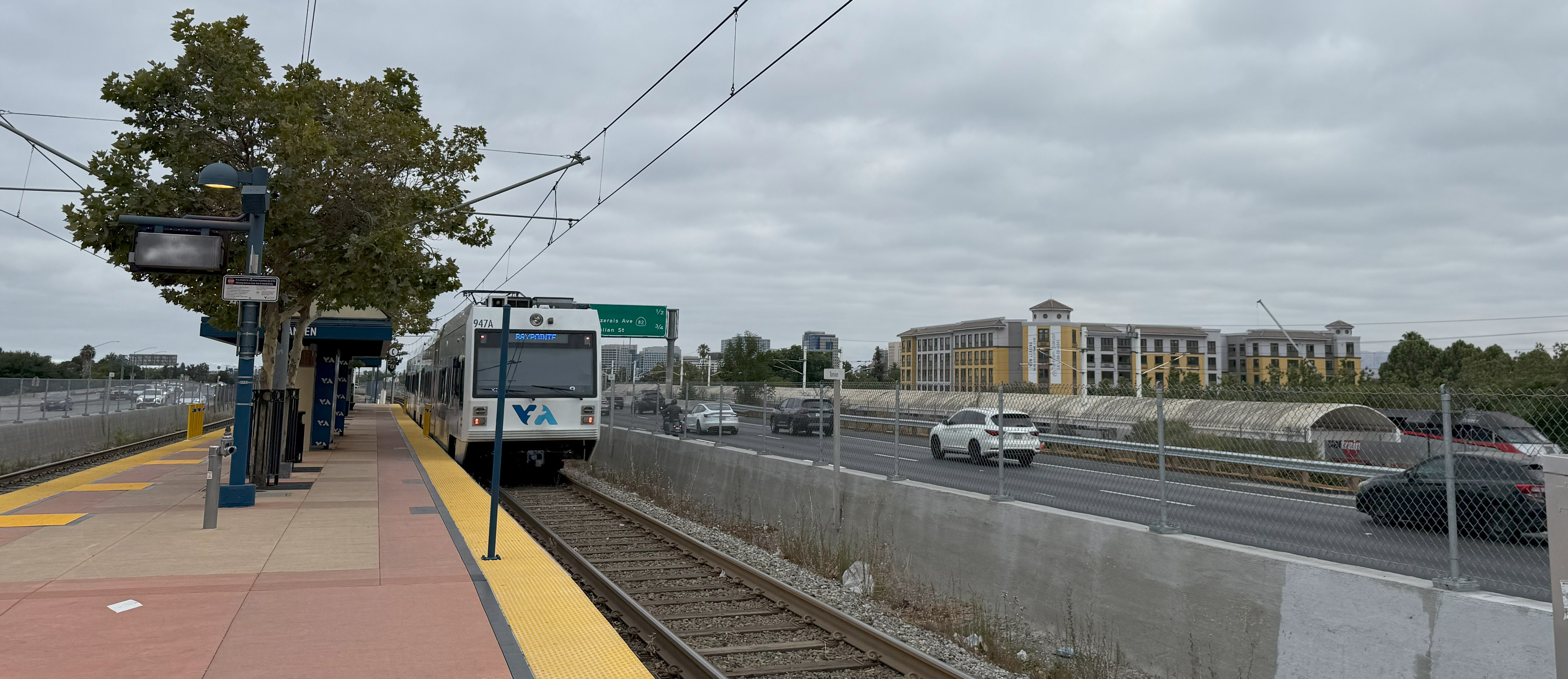
- The light rail platform with the Caltrain platform across northbound State Route 87 in 2025

General information
- Location: 1355 Lick Avenue; San Jose, California
- Coordinates: 37°18′46″N 121°53′05″W
- Owner: Peninsula Corridor Joint Powers Board (PCJPB); Santa Clara Valley Transportation Authority
- Lines: PCJPB Peninsula Subdivision (Caltrain); Guadalupe Phase 3 (VTA)
- Platforms: 1 island platform (Caltrain); 1 island platform (VTA)
- Tracks: 3 (Caltrain); 2 (VTA)
- Connections: VTA Bus: 25, 56

Construction
- Parking: 275 spaces
- Cycle facilities: 18 racks, 10 lockers, BayWheels bike share station
- Accessible: Yes

Other information
- Fare zone: 4 (Caltrain)

History
- Opened: August 17, 1990 (VTA); July 1, 1992 (Caltrain)

Passengers
- FY 2025: 243 (weekday avg.) ▲15% (Caltrain)

Services
Preceding station	Caltrain	Following station
San Jose Diridon toward San Francisco	Local Limited service	Terminus
San Jose Diridon toward San Francisco	Weekend Local Limited service	Terminus
San Jose Diridon Terminus	South County Connector	Capitol toward Gilroy
Preceding station	VTA	Following station
Virginia toward Baypointe	Blue Line	Curtner toward Santa Teresa
Former services
Preceding station	Caltrain	Following station
San Jose Diridon toward San Francisco	Local (L1)	Terminus
San Jose Diridon toward San Francisco	Weekend Local (L2)	Terminus
San Jose Diridon toward San Francisco	Limited (L3)	Capitol (select peak-hour trains only) toward Gilroy
San Jose Diridon toward San Francisco	Limited (L4)	Capitol (select peak-hour trains only) toward Gilroy
San Jose Diridon toward San Francisco	Limited (L5)	Terminus
Future services
Preceding station	Amtrak	Following station
San Jose Diridon toward Auburn	Capitol Corridor	Morgan Hill toward Salinas
Coast Starlight does not stop here
Location

Tamien station is an intermodal passenger transportation station in the Tamien neighborhood of central San Jose, California. It is served by the Caltrain regional rail service and the Blue Line of the VTA light rail system, as well as by Santa Clara Valley Transportation Authority (VTA) buses. The station is named after the Tamien (also spelled Tamyen) who are some of the Ohlone, a Native American people.

== Station design ==
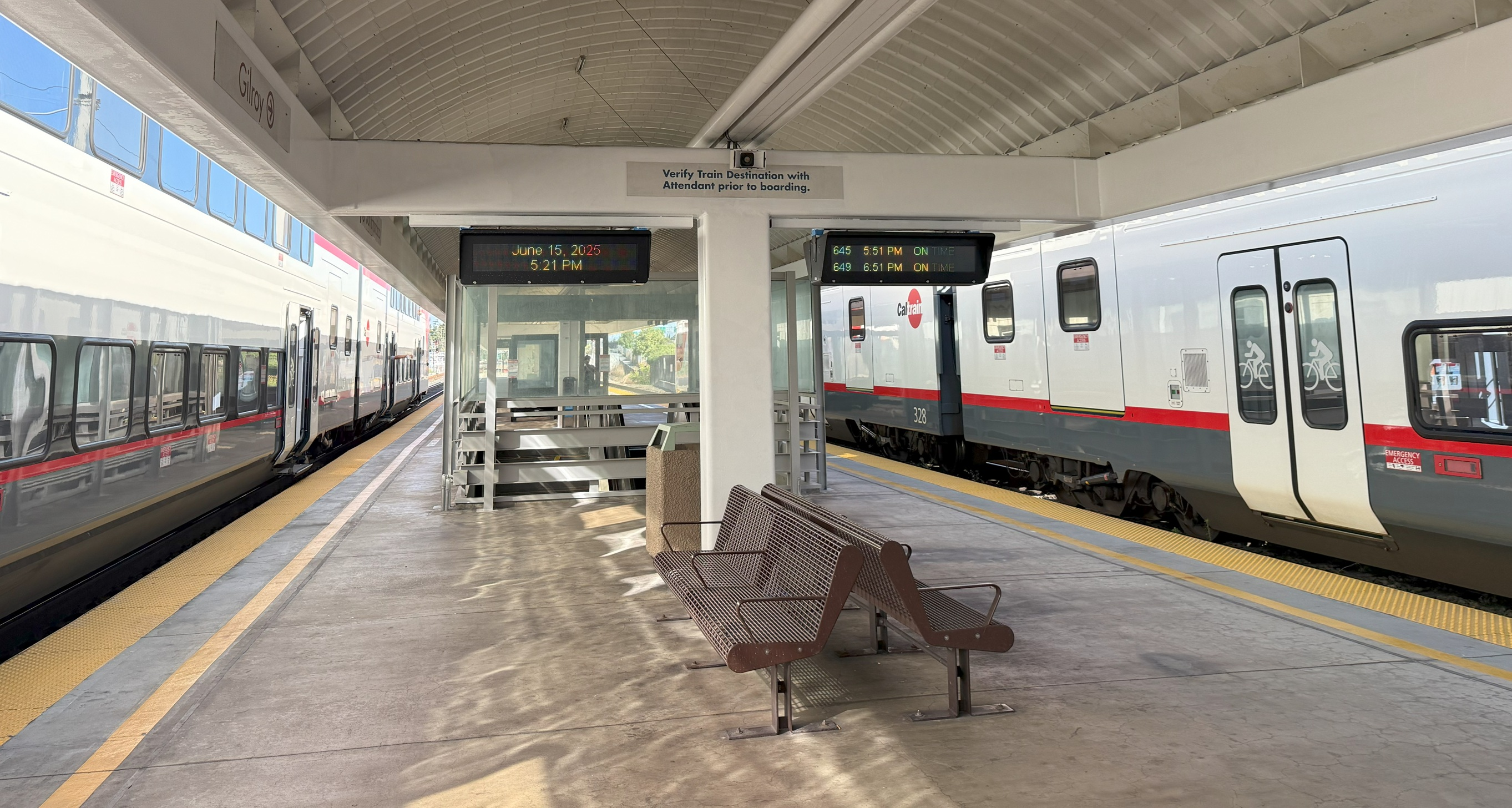
Electric Caltrain trains at the station in 2025

The station is located along the elevated California State Route 87 freeway in the Tamien neighborhood of central San Jose, California, about 1.5 miles (2.4 km) south of the downtown area. The light rail platform, an island platform serving the two light rail tracks, is located in the freeway median. The Caltrain platform is located on the east side of the freeway adjacent to the Highway 87 Bikeway. The 989-foot (301 m)-long island platform serves the western main track and a siding of the Peninsula Subdivision; the east main track is used only by freight.

Parking lots are located off Lelong Street on the west side of the station complex and Lick Avenue on the east side. A street-level walkway runs between the platforms, with stairs and escalators to the center of the Caltrain platform and the north end of the VTA platform. An entrance from the Lelong Street lot leads to the south end of the VTA platform. Elevators are located at the center of the Caltrain platform and the south end of the VTA platform.

Tamien is the southern terminus of electrified Caltrain service; it is served by half of local trains. Peak-hour South County Connector diesel trains between San Jose and Gilroy also stop at Tamien.

== History ==
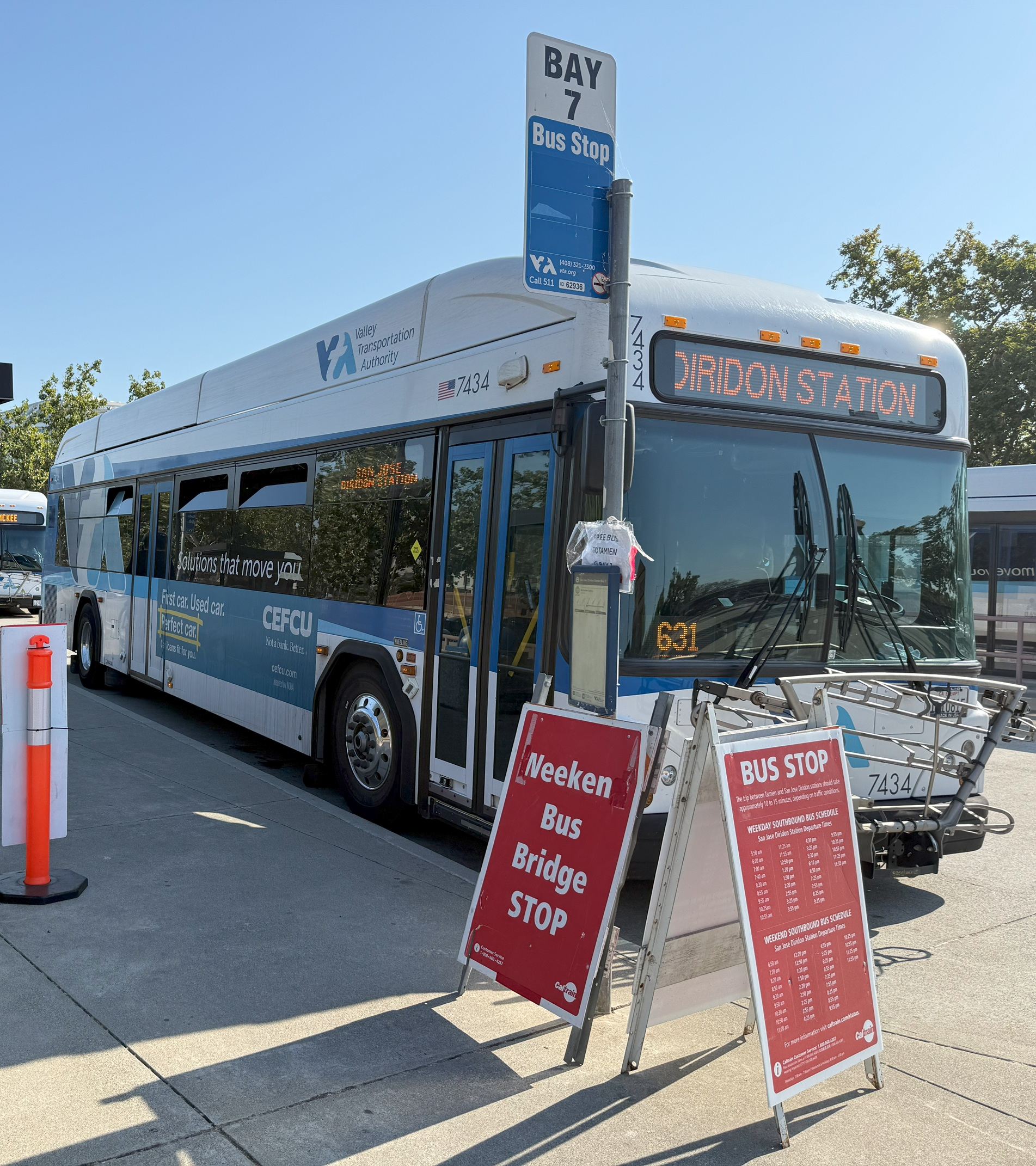
Replacement shuttle heading to Tamien at San Jose Diridon in 2025

Tamien station is named after an Ohlone village that once stood at the site. Construction began on the station with a groundbreaking ceremony on June 21, 1990.

The light rail station opened on August 17, 1990. Caltrain service began on July 1, 1992 as part of an extension to Gilroy. Midday and weekend Caltrain service initially terminated at San Jose Diridon station, with bus shuttles to Tamien. Weekend service and some off-peak service was extended to Tamien on December 14, 2020, eliminating the shuttles.

VTA began planning in the 2010s for transit oriented development to replace the parking lots. The agency was awarded $18 million in state funds for the project in March 2022. Construction on the first phase, which replaces the northern half of the Lick Avenue lot, began in October 2023.

On June 16, 2025, electric Caltrain service between San Jose Diridon and Tamien was temporarily replaced with buses. The suspension, needed to accommodate construction for the Guadalupe Bridge Replacement Project, was expected to last for eight months. South County Connector and VTA trains continue to serve the station. Full electric Caltrain service resumed on January 31, 2026.
