= Peninsula Commute =

Passenger rail service between San Francisco and San Jose

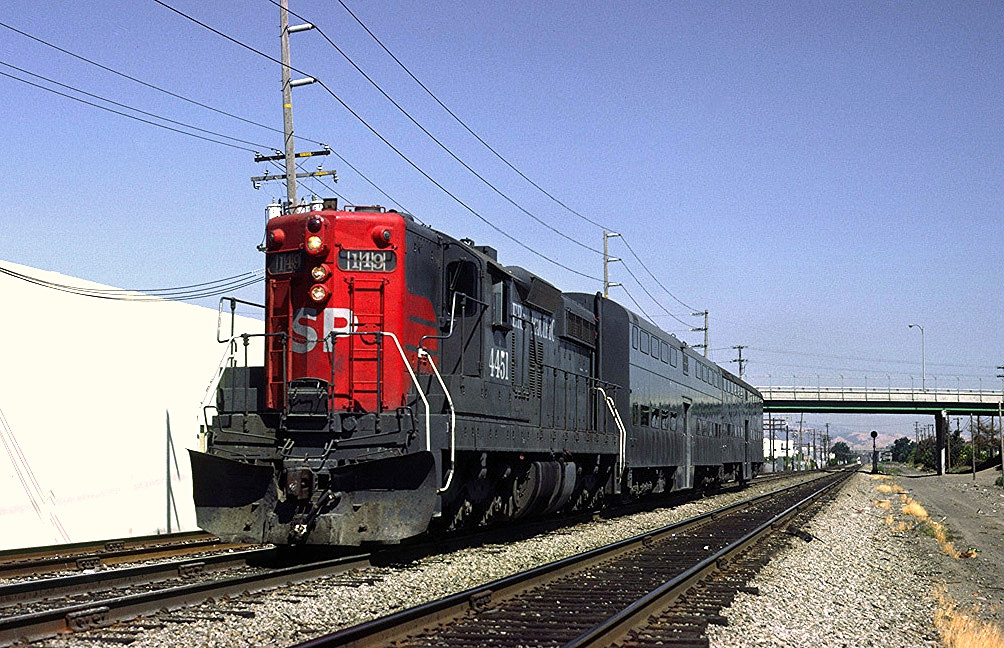
- West (railroad north) of Santa Clara, a Southern Pacific EMD SD9E #4451 leads a two-car train before the Caltrain takeover

Overview
- Owner: San Francisco & San Jose Railroad (1863–1870); Southern Pacific (1870–1980)
- Area served: San Francisco Peninsula; Santa Clara Valley
- Locale: San Francisco, San Mateo, and Santa Clara
- Transit type: Commuter rail
- Number of lines: 1
- Number of stations: 32

Operation
- Began operation: 1863
- Operators: San Francisco & San Jose Railroad (1863–1870); Southern Pacific (1870–1980); Amtrak (1978–1979)
- Character: commuter railroad with level crossings partial service on freight lines

Technical
- System length: 50 mi (80 km)
- Track gauge: 4 ft 8 1/2 in (1,435 mm) standard gauge
- Top speed: 79 mph (127 km/h)

The Peninsula Commute, also known as the Southern Pacific Peninsula or just Peninsula, was the common name for commuter rail service between San Jose and San Francisco on the San Francisco Peninsula. This service ran as a private, for-profit enterprise beginning in 1863. Due to operating losses, the Southern Pacific Railroad (SP) petitioned to discontinue the service in 1977. Subsidies were provided through Caltrans in 1980 to continue service, and it was renamed Caltrain in 1985.

== History ==
Since 1863 the San Francisco Peninsula, the series of towns (and later, cities) between San Francisco and San Jose, has been served by a railroad. The San Francisco and San Jose Railroad first provided freight and passenger service, followed by its successor, the Southern Pacific, and then briefly by Caltrans and finally by a regional Joint Powers Board which runs today's passenger trains.

=== San Francisco–San Jose Railroad ===
Although a line had been proposed in the past, construction on the railroad between San Francisco and San Jose was started in 1860 "by a group of local capitalists of more than ordinary energy and resources" under the auspices of the San Francisco and San Jose Railroad (SF&SJ), and completed in 1863. The Central Pacific Railroad transferred its rights for the construction of the right-of-way between San Jose and Sacramento to the Western Pacific Railroad (WPRR, which was founded by the same members that had founded the SF&SJ) in late 1862.

In December 1865, the Southern Pacific Railroad Company (SP) was incorporated to build a rail line between San Francisco and San Diego. By the end of 1868, it was revealed the Big Four of the Central Pacific consisting of Stanford, Huntington, Hopkins, and Crocker had a controlling interest in the SF&SJ and SP, and the SF&SJ, SP, the Santa Clara and Pajaro Valley Railroad, and the California Southern were folded into a consolidated Southern Pacific Railroad on October 12, 1870.

=== Under Southern Pacific ===
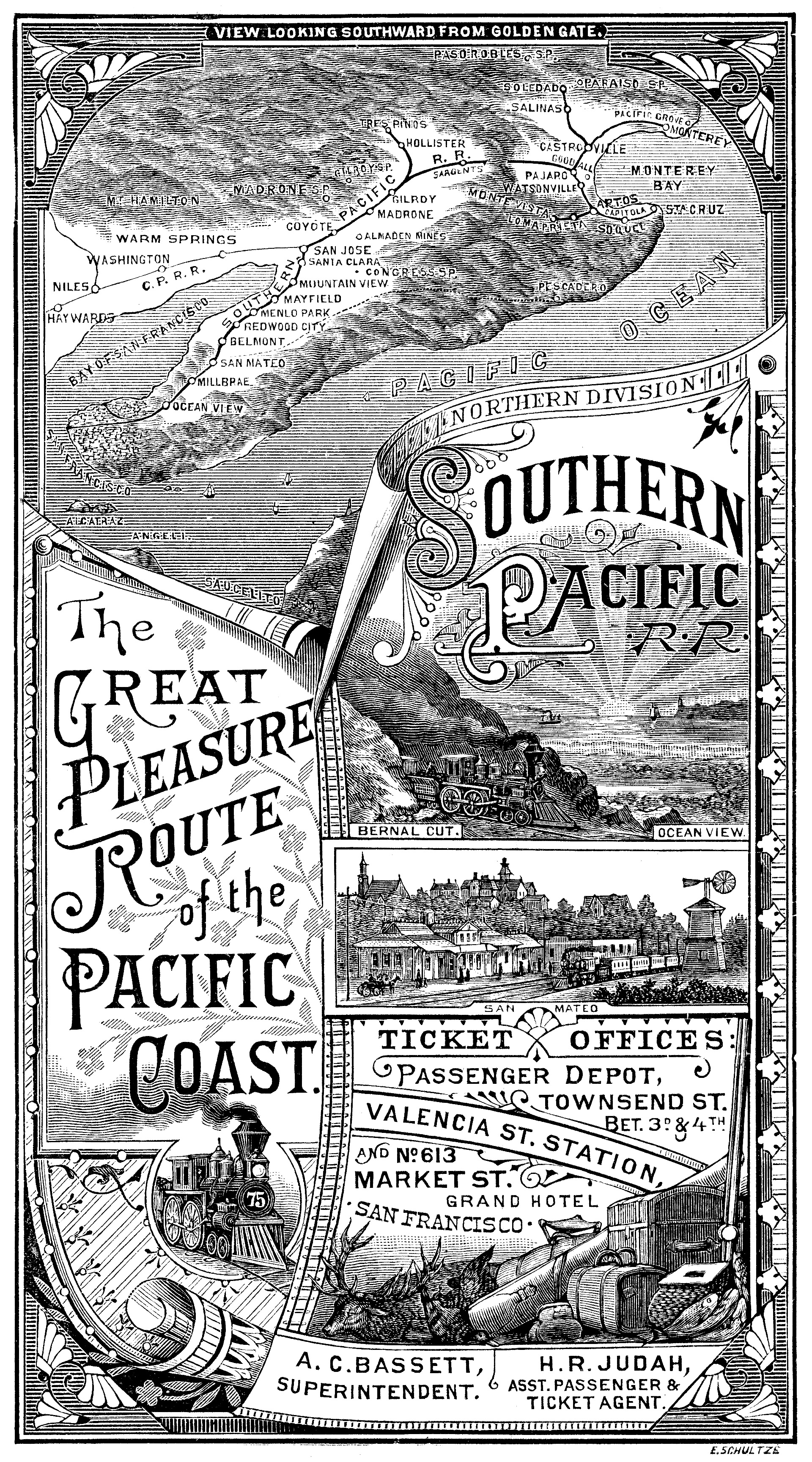
Pictorial map of system in 1885

Under Southern Pacific the line was double tracked in 1904, and multiple cutoffs were built over a period ending in 1910. The first of these, the Bayshore Cutoff, opened in 1907 and rerouted the line through a series of five tunnels built along the shoreline of the San Francisco Bay Area. This saved approximately three miles and seventeen minutes compared to the prior route, which veered to the west around San Bruno Mountain. The Bayshore Cutoff also eliminated the use of helper engines to bring trains over the mountain. The second, the Mayfield Cutoff, opened in 1908 to provide service to western Santa Clara Valley cities such as Los Altos and Los Gatos. The third, the Dumbarton Cutoff, opened in 1910 and included the first bridge across the San Francisco Bay Area, between Newark and Menlo Park, saving many miles to Oakland and Sacramento compared to the prior route through San Jose and Santa Clara.

The Peninsula Electric Railroad was incorporated around the same time the Dumbarton Cutoff project was launched, and it was suspected that it was controlled by Southern Pacific in preparation for a quad-track expansion, as it was laying a route parallel with the Southern Pacific. As envisioned in 1909 from plans for the Peninsula Electric, SP announced that it would investigate the electrification of its Peninsula Commute line in September 1921, promising better and more frequent service. Just a few days later, SP cited excessive post-war inflation, taxation, and competition from publicly funded highways as factors making electrification neither "practicable or desirable". Similarly, plans to eliminate all at-grade crossings were announced in 1909, but not carried to completion. As Southern Pacific's franchise to operate on 4th Street in San Jose was ending, it elected to build a diversion track to the west. This line forced a move for the city's passenger traffic to a new station at Cahill, placing it one mile from downtown (whereas it had previously been a four-block distance). Passenger service along the Ocean View Branch ended after November 1928.

SP's Peninsula Commute experienced record ridership during World War II. During the war, 26 trains ran between San Jose and San Francisco per day, with headways as low as 5 minutes (traveling north) in the mornings and 3 minutes (traveling south) in the evenings. After the war, a May 1946 railroad strike displaced approximately 10,000 train passengers onto highways, causing "historic" traffic jams along the Bayshore Highway, with commute times for some automobile drivers to balloon from 30 minutes to 75 minutes going from Burlingame to San Francisco, a distance of approximately 19 miles (31 km). In 1954, surveys comparing traffic on Bayshore Highway with train traffic concluded that just over half of all commuters to San Francisco passing through Brisbane were taking the train, and that eight more lanes would need to be added to the freeway to accommodate traffic if rail service were to stop suddenly.

However, in the period after the war, Peninsula roads were improved; the four-lane undivided Bayshore Highway (completed in 1925) was rebuilt into a six-lane divided freeway between 1949 and 1962, and Interstate 280 was completed in the 1970s. Train ridership declined with the rise of automobile use, falling from a peak of 9.2 million annual boardings in 1954 (approximately 16,000 weekday riders) to 4.4 million in 1977 (approximately 7,000 weekday riders). Service to Los Gatos ended in 1959; the railroad noted the ease of reaching Vasona, the new end of the line, via automobile. The Mayfield Branch saw its last service in 1964, with its right of way reused in construction of the Foothill Expressway.

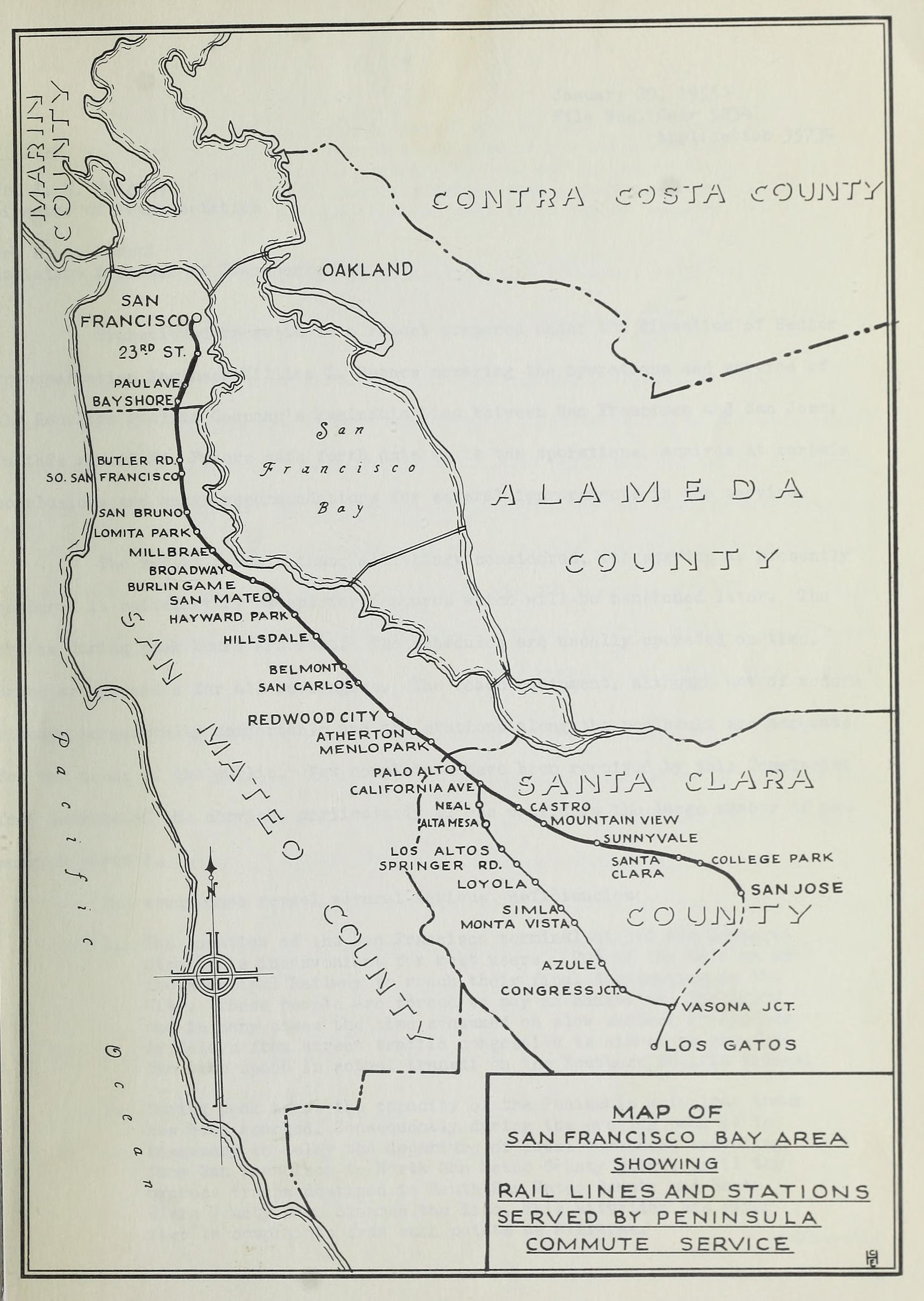
Map of system in 1955, drawn by the CPUC

During peak hours in 1975, Peninsula Commute trains operated with headways as low as three or four minutes; however, with skip-stop and express train service patterns, the minimum wait for riders at a given station would be ten minutes. During off-peak hours that same year, service frequencies dropped to longer than two hours between trains.

On several occasions during the 1960s and 1970s, SP attempted to discontinue the commute service due to increasing deficits and stagnant ridership. Ridership was 11,500 daily passengers on 22 trains in 1970, compared to 12,000 daily passengers in 1967 and 10,000 daily passengers in 1946. The sole daily commute train which utilized the Mayfield Cutoff between Palo Alto and Vasona was discontinued in 1964 with the construction of the Foothill Expressway. In 1971, when Amtrak took over long distance passenger operations, Southern Pacific's extended commute train to Monterey, the "Del Monte", was discontinued. Some SP passenger locomotives were sold to Amtrak and the remainder were transferred to Peninsula Commute service, which continued to operate. In 1975, the Metropolitan Transportation Commission (MTC) published the Feasibility of Upgrading Peninsula Passenger Rail Service (PERSUS) report. PERSUS concluded the Peninsula Commute was underutilized and proposed a minor upgrade to improve service (and ridership), or major upgrades to extend service to downtown San Francisco, either by connecting with BART in Daly City, or by extending the SP terminus to the Transbay Terminal; the ultimate goal was to remodel the service to be closer to transit than commuter rail, which entailed a reduction in headways so that passengers would have to wait less than fifteen minutes between trains during weekday daylight hours.

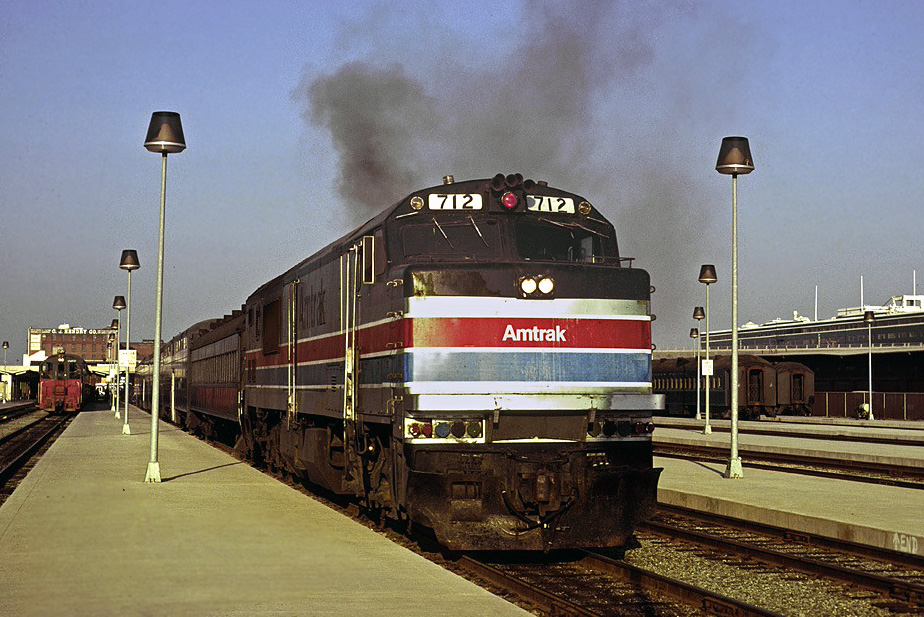
In 1978/79, SP leased several GE P30CHs from Amtrak to operate the Peninsula Commute. 4th and King (October, 1978)

However, by that time the Peninsula Commute was no longer profitable: operating deficits were rising, from US$670,000 (equivalent to $6,955,000 in 2025) in 1964 to over US$1,000,000 (equivalent to $9,260,000 in 2025) by 1968, US$5,300,000 (equivalent to $31,710,000 in 2025) by 1975, and US$9,000,000 (equivalent to $50,920,000 in 2025) just one year later in 1976 according to an independent review, which prompted SP to petition the California Public Utilities Commission (CPUC) for a fare increase of 111 percent in August 1974, as fares had increased minimally and ridership, approximately 12,000 passengers per day in 1967 remained flat, despite the fuel crisis. The CPUC authorized a 25% increase in fares in a 3–2 vote on July 12, 1977, effective August 1977. Because the CPUC decision process was so slow, SP President Benjamin Biaggini offered to purchase 1,000 eight-passenger vans and donate them for vanpools in exchange for permanently discontinuing the Peninsula Commute service.

The strange result in the decision of the majority is a travesty of justice. Ironically, it is so bad it is likely to even jeopardize the interest of the one group who seems to benefit, that is the present SP commuters who are being so heavily subsidized by others. Danger to commute interest comes from the real possibility that the ICC may require abandonment of train commute service because it finds the present intolerable situation constitutes an undue burden on interstate commerce. From our involvement in the case we have seen nothing that could be used to prove that the ICC is wrong in taking this unfortunate action.

— Dissenting commissioners, July 12, 1977 CPUC 25% fare increase ruling

On May 6, 1977, SP formally filed a petition with the CPUC (Application No. 57289) to discontinue the commuter operation due to ongoing losses. At that time, SP was running 44 trains a day. The petition was opposed by regional transit agencies, including the MTC, who passed Resolution No. 479 to request the CPUC deny the SP petition. On October 17, 1977, the administrative law judge issued an order asking "Who will pay the cost of this regional insurance against the uncertainties of tomorrow? In the interim period, CALTRANS, the Metropolitan Transportation Commission, and the three counties involved are directed to meet, consult, and plan toward whether they will be willing to obtain funds under the provisions of the Urban Mass Transportation Act and their own resources to meet the operating deficit of Southern Pacific's commute and transit operations."

Since the CPUC had not taken action on the petition 120 days after the filing, SP filed another petition to discontinue service with the Interstate Commerce Commission (ICC) on November 17, 1977. Although the CPUC denied the SP application on April 19, 1978, jurisdiction had already passed to ICC.

=== State administration and Caltrain ===
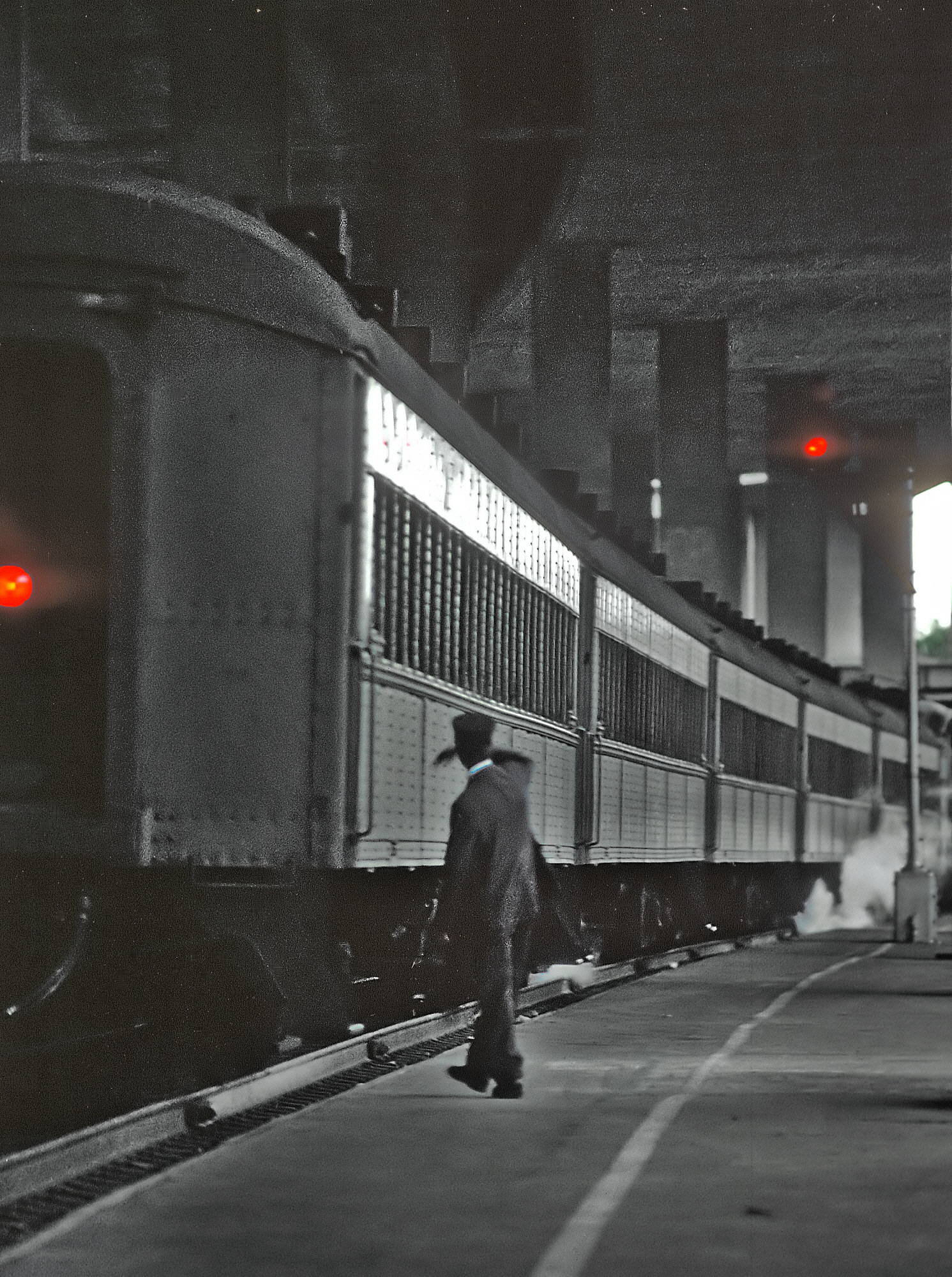
Last days of SP equipment, including these "Suburban" single-level coaches at 22nd Street (April 1985)

In response to the CPUC petition, Assemblymember Lou Papan wrote Assembly Bill 1853, which allowed local transit districts served by the Peninsula Commute to purchase tickets from SP at face value and sell them to riders at a discount, subsidizing passengers. AB 1853 also allowed Caltrans to negotiate with SP for operation of the commuter rail service and the purchase of the right-of-way between Daly City and San Bruno, which had only seen occasional freight traffic since the completion of the Bayshore Cutoff in 1907. Preservation of rail service was seen as critical to ensuring traffic would continue to flow, as both the Bayshore Freeway and I-280 were nearing capacity; and to preserve air quality in the region. The right-of-way between Daly City and San Bruno was seen as key to a planned extension of BART to San Francisco International Airport, an extension that eventually opened in 2003.

The recommendations of the 1977 Peninsula Transit Alternatives Project (PENTAP) Report (mandated by the Legislature in 1975 by SB 283) were used to draft AB 1853. PENTAP recommended that train and bus service be improved, fixed rail transit facilities be better utilized in the near future, and facilities and options should be preserved for long-range expansion and modernization. MTC passed Resolution No. 411 in 1977, proposing a three-phased approach:

1. Maintain existing service levels, by subsidizing passenger fares and improving the SP interface with MUNI
2. Improve service levels and standards, by entering into a "purchase of service" contract with a rail operator (SP) and defining service based on regional transit requirements, not operator needs or profits
3. Expand rail service

In a December 1977 public hearing before the Assembly Committee on Transportation held in San Jose, SP executive Alan DeMoss testified that "rail commute service should no longer be cross-subsidized by other railroad activities" and offered $8 million to help purchase buses to replace the service. However, both samTrans and the Santa Clara County Transit District stated they would not be able to operate that bus service; it was estimated that a fleet of 122 buses would be required, arriving and departing from San Francisco every 35 to 50 seconds. Testifying later at that same hearing, SamTrans chair John Mauro pointed out that since the inception of the San Mateo County bus service in 1975, service to San Francisco was purposely crippled in speed to avoid competing with the rail service. Mauro had previously tried to negotiate with SP to enter a "purchase of service" contract in March 1976, but SP refused to accept a direct subsidy, which led to the passenger fare subsidy instead. During that hearing, the committee chair, Walter Ingalls, stated bluntly the state was not "going to authorize either SamTrans or Santa Clara County or San Francisco County or any of the three to buy and operate a railroad. [...] No one's going to offer to buy your railroad." SP had previously offered to sell MTC a single track along the right-of-way between San Bruno and San Jose in December 1975, which could have been used to extend BART, but the offer was not taken.

Ridership increased during 1979 and 1980, aided by the gasoline crisis and fare subsidies; the Peninsula Commute was so sensitive to gasoline prices that ridership jumped by 40% in May and June 1979. SP's ICC petition received a preliminary affirmative ruling from the administrative law judge in July 1979. To preserve the commuter service, Caltrans took over financial responsibility on July 1, 1980, and contracted with SP to operate the service. In the first fiscal year, covering 1980–81, operating costs were $19.33 million and fare revenue was $7.81 million, resulting in a farebox recovery ratio of 43%. The deficit was covered by a mix of Urban Mass Transportation Act funds ($2 million), contributions from SP ($400,000), and the state and three counties served ($4.56 million each). During state administration, Caltrans purchased new locomotives and cars that replaced the SP equipment in 1985 and provided push-pull service (removing the need to turn locomotives around at terminals), upgraded stations, introduced shuttle buses to nearby employers, and renamed the operation Caltrain. Southern Pacific continued to operate the service under contract to Caltrans. However, ridership continued to decline and the farebox recovery ratio fell to 34.3% in the 1983–84 fiscal year, which violated the minimum of 40% set by AB 1010 in 1982.

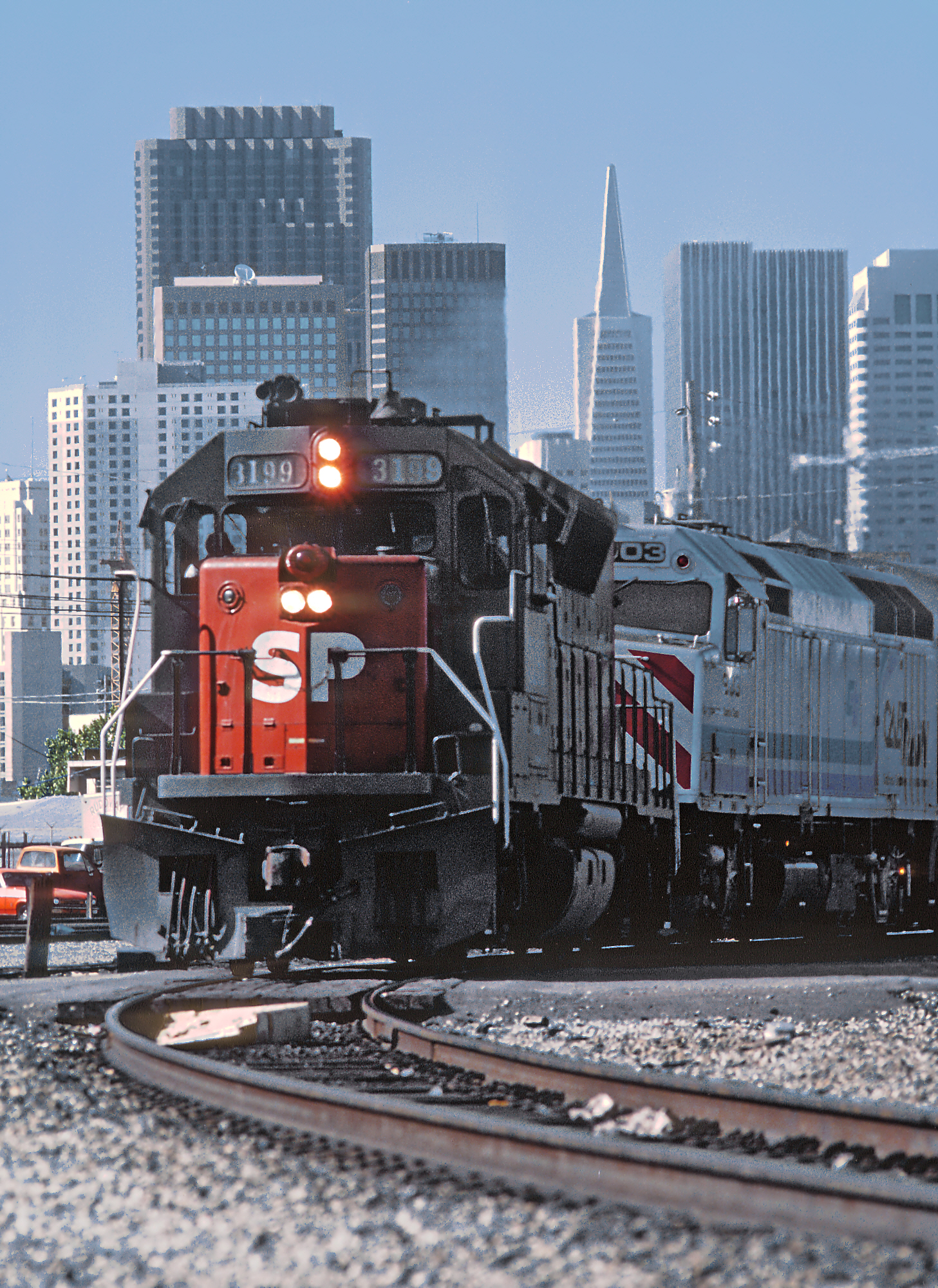
Changing of the guard: SP No. 3199 leads Caltrain No. 903 out of San Francisco (August 1985)

By 1988, the service was the only operating commuter rail in California. The state felt that regional control of the Peninsula Commute was more appropriate, as it was primarily a benefit to the region, not the state. Thus, the Peninsula Corridor right-of-way was purchased for US$202,000,000 (equivalent to $477,500,000 in 2025) from SP in 1991 by the newly formed Peninsula Corridor Joint Powers Board (PCJPB), who subsequently assumed responsibility for the operation of Caltrain in 1992. The PCJB then contracted operations to Amtrak, ending 122 years of operation by Southern Pacific. TransitAmerica Services took over operations in 2012.

== Rolling stock ==
SP took over the Peninsula Corridor route from the SF&SJ in 1870 and assumed control of the existing set of locomotives and passenger cars, which were mainly 4-4-0 steam engines and 36-passenger wooden railcars. As SP began introducing diesel locomotives on its long-distance (main-line) routes, steam engines were moved into Peninsula Commute service, culminating in the use of the large "General Service" 4-8-4 locomotives which served the Peninsula Corridor through 1957. Diesel-electric Fairbanks-Morse Train Masters had been running in Peninsula Commute service since 1954. Fairbanks-Morse and, later, EMD diesels served the Peninsula Commute past 1980, when the state-run CalTrain began assuming financial responsibility for the service, and were not retired until 1985, when the state purchased new EMD F40PH locomotives. One of the factors driving the purchase of new locomotives was the dramatic increase in annual lease costs in 1985.

=== Locomotives ===
Steam

Steam locomotives of the Peninsula Commute
Builder	Model/Class	Locomotive Numbers	Years of service	Notes	Photograph
Various	4-4-0 "Eight Wheel" or "American"		1870-1900s		
Various	2-6-0 "Mogul"		1870-1900s		
Various	4-4-2 "Atlantic"		1870-1900s		
Various	4-6-0 "Ten Wheel"		c. 1900s-1950s		
American Locomotive Company	4-6-2 "Pacific"	2400–2404	c. 1923/24–1954	Built 1904; displaced from main-line passenger service by 4-8-2 locomotives.	
Baldwin	4-6-2 "Pacific"	2405–2427	c. 1923/24–1954	Built 1906–1907; displaced from main-line passenger service by 4-8-2 locomotives.	
Schenectady	4-8-2 "Mountain"	4300–4327	c. 1945–1954	Built 1923–1924; displaced from main-line passenger service by 4-8-4.	
Baldwin	4-8-4; GS-1	4400–4409	c. 1950–1957	"General Service" or "Golden State" class built 1930; displaced from main-line passenger service by diesel-electric locomotives.	
Lima	4-8-4; GS-2 thru GS-6	4410–4469	c. 1950–1957	Built starting 1937	

With population (and ridership) growth on the Peninsula, the initial mix of 4-4-0, 2-6-0, and 4-4-2 locomotives were replaced by 4-6-0s. Older locomotives were redesignated to Commute service after they were displaced by newer locomotives assuming main-line (long-distance, inter-city) passenger service. Pacific-type 4-6-2s were used on peak-hour commutes by the 1930s and 1940s, displacing 4-6-0s, and more 4-6-2s were made available for the Commute by the introduction of 4-8-2s in main-line service; by 1945, the 4-8-2s were displacing 4-6-2s on peak-hour trains, 4-6-2s were moved to off-peak service, and 4-6-0s were used on weekend trains. By the early 1950s, peak-hour trains were pulling up to seventeen cars in a single consist, requiring the use of the "General Service" class 4-8-4s.

After gaining experience with diesel engines in main-line service, SP began testing various diesel locomotives for the Peninsula Commute, finally selecting the Fairbanks-Morse H-24-66 "Train Master" because the relatively short distance between stations meant acceleration (and power) was the paramount priority. The final steam-led Peninsula Commute train departed San Francisco for San Jose on January 22, 1957, led by 4-8-4 No. 4430. However, 4-6-2 No. 2472 was moved from San Francisco to San Jose at the head of Caltrain #74 on December 16, 1994; #2472 was to lead a special charity excursion train back to San Francisco the next day. While coupled to Caltrain #74, though, #2472 was used to help accelerate the train out of each station, so it was not just a cosmetic appearance. #2472 has since been used occasionally along the Peninsula Corridor for special service, but not while providing revenue passenger service.

Diesel

Diesel locomotives of the Peninsula Commute
Builder	Model	Locomotive Numbers	Years of service	Notes	Photograph
EMD	EMD GP9	3186–3196	1954–1985	Initially built as 5600–5603, 5622–5625, 5893–5895; renumbered to 3000–3010 in 1965-66; renumbered to 3186–3196 in 1975. Reverted to SP control in 1985 after lease expired. At least two survived: 5623 and 3194.	1982 "Rainbow" scheme
Fairbanks Morse	FM H-24-66	3020–3035	1954–1975	Delivered as 4800–4815; 4800 and 4801 were the F-M "western" demonstrators TM-3 and TM-4. Renumbered to 3020–3035 in 1966. All retired and scrapped once major rebuilds were required.	
EMD	EMD SDP45	3200–3209	1971–1985	Moved from long-distance (inter-city) service after Amtrak takeover in 1971. Replaced F-M H-24-66 as they were retired. Pulled from duty in 1978–79. Reverted to SP control in 1985.	
EMD	EMD SD9/EMD SD9E	4450 Huff and 4451 Puff	1973/74–85	4450 was scrapped at the Western Pacific Railroad Museum in Portola, California, after featuring for years in the collection of the Golden Gate Railway Museum. 4451 still survives in 2017, in derelict condition, at Schellville, California.	
EMD	EMD GP40P-2	3197-3199	1974–1985	Supplemented SDP45s. Reverted to SP control in 1985. Rebuilt as GP40-2 to remove steam generators for passenger car heating once leases reverted to SP. Currently in service: Union Pacific 1373, 1375; Indiana Harbor Belt 4010.	
GE Transportation Systems	GE P30CH	Amtrak 7xx (15 total)	1978–79	Leased to SP for 1978–79 after SP SDP45s were pulled from passenger service under an ICC order to return offline freight cars.	

The first diesel on the Peninsula Commute ran on September 28, 1953, using SP Locomotive No. 5325, an EMD SD7 equipped with a steam boiler; it left the shortly thereafter, as the SD7 was unable to match the performance of the 4-6-2 steam locomotives then being used for off-peak and weekend service.

SP began testing Fairbanks-Morse (F-M) "Train Master" H-24-66 locomotives in late 1953, and purchased two of the four demonstrator models for use on the Peninsula Commute service. Because the existing "Suburban" and "Harriman" passenger cars then prevalent in the fleet took steam heat from the locomotive boiler, SP passenger diesel engines were equipped with steam generators. The diesel era of the Peninsula Commute began on August 25, 1954, when two Train Masters went into test service. The Train Masters, which used the unique opposed-piston two-stroke 38 8-1/8 prime mover developed by F-M for American diesel-electric submarines in World War II, were the most powerful diesel-electric locomotives available at a nominal 2,400 hp (1,800 kW), and had performance comparable to the 4-8-4s for peak service: while the starting tractive effort of the "General Service" class 4-8-4 ranged from 63,230 to 66,330 lbf (281.3 to 295.1 kN), the Train Master was rated at 79,500 lbf (354 kN).

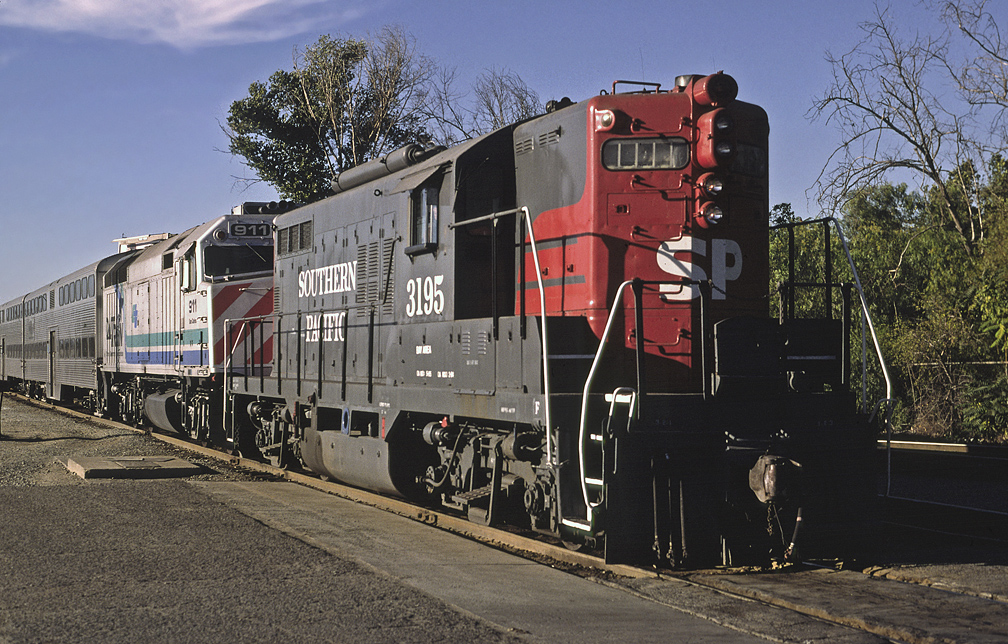
SP No. 3195 (GP9) running in tandem with Caltrain No. 911 (F40PH) in August 1985

The Train Masters were complemented by a fleet of EMD GP9s fitted with steam generators; while peak-hour trains required one Train Master or two GP9s, off-peak and weekend trains could more economically use a single GP9. Switching duties were handled by an ALCO RS-32, or an ALCO S-4. When Amtrak took over inter-city (main-line) service in 1971, the SP EMD SDP45s then in main-line use were reassigned to Commute service, and three unique passenger-equipped EMD GP40P-2 engines were delivered in 1974, allowing SP to retire all of the Train Masters by 1975. The fleet of EMD GP9s, SDP45s, and GP40P-2s were used by SP to run the Peninsula Commute.

In 1978, SP pulled the SDP45s from Peninsula Commute service to comply with an ICC order to return freight cars. Amtrak leased fifteen GE P30CH locomotives to SP to keep the commuter rail service running, but none of the GE engines were equipped with steam generators. After 1980, the SP fleet continued in leased service to the nascent state-run CalTrain service until the state of California ordered new EMD F40PH locomotives, which were delivered in 1985. Shortly after the introduction of the F40PHs in 1985, a brake issue was discovered, forcing the F40PHs to briefly run in tandem with an SP locomotive.

=== Passenger cars ===
Passenger cars of the Peninsula Commute
Builder	Model	Numbers	Quantity	Seats	Years of service	Notes	Photograph
Pullman?	Harriman	19xx–20xx	approx. 90	72	c.1900–1968	Ordered in 10 groups (60-C-1 to 60-C-10), passenger compartment nominally 60 feet (18 m) long, for main-line service. Introduced to the Peninsula Commute in the 1930s to replace earlier wooden cars still in service. Out of service by 1968. At least two (#1949 and #1975) survive in service for the Niles Canyon Railway.	
Pullman & Standard Steel	Suburban	2085–2159	75 total	96	1924/1927–1985	Passenger compartment was 72 feet (22 m) long, distinguishing these from earlier "Harriman" cars. Ordered in three groups: 72-IC-1 (1924; qty 60; #2085–2144); 72-IC-2 (1924; qty 10; #2145–2154); 72-IC-3 (1927; qty 5; #2155–2159); Thirteen cars have since been restored and converted to electric heating, and are currently in service with the Grand Canyon Railway. Several have been preserved at the Golden Gate Railroad Museum, Niles Canyon Railway, Railtown 1897, Western Railway Museum, and other locations.	Interior
Pullman & Standard Steel	Suburban	2089, 2092, 2115, 2120, 2128, 2130, 2135, 2142, 2145, 2152	10	96	1924/1927–1985	Classified as "unserviceable" in 1980 and used as parts cars.	Interior
Pullman?	Streamliner	2202	1	122	1965–71?	ex-Daylight #2400 or 2401, built in 1937. Rebuilt in 1965 with five-across seating. Sold to Stockton Terminal & Eastern in 1971. Currently owned by the Northwest Rail Museum and stored near Tillamook, Oregon.	
Pullman-Standard	Gallery	3700-3709	10	145	1955–1985	Used incandescent lights and on-board diesel generator for air conditioning.: 85-MLC-1 (1955; qty 10; #3700–3709; P-S); 85-MLC-2 (1957; qty 21; #3710–3730; ACF); 85-MLC-2 Order built to Pullman-Standard designs by AC&F. Six of the 85-MLC-1 cars were sold to Transcisco Tours and have subsequently been purchased by BNSF Railway for use as business cars and track geometry cars (ex-3700–3703, 3707, 3708). Three of the 85-MLC-2 cars (3714, 3720, 3722) are preserved at the Golden Gate Railroad Museum in Schellville, California.	
American Car & Foundry	Gallery	3710-3730	21	145	1957-1985		
Pullman-Standard	Gallery	3731–3745	15	164	1968–1985	Distinguished by fluorescent lights, tinted windows, and stainless steel vestibule doors compared with prior series. Group 85-MLC-3 (1968; qty 15; #3731–3745; built by P-S). The entire fleet of 46 gallery cars was purchased by Tillamook Repair Car for service on Tour Alaska (later Princess Tours) in 1986 and four were rebuilt as Ultra Domes (ex-3734, 3740, 3744, 3745) with 90 seats.	

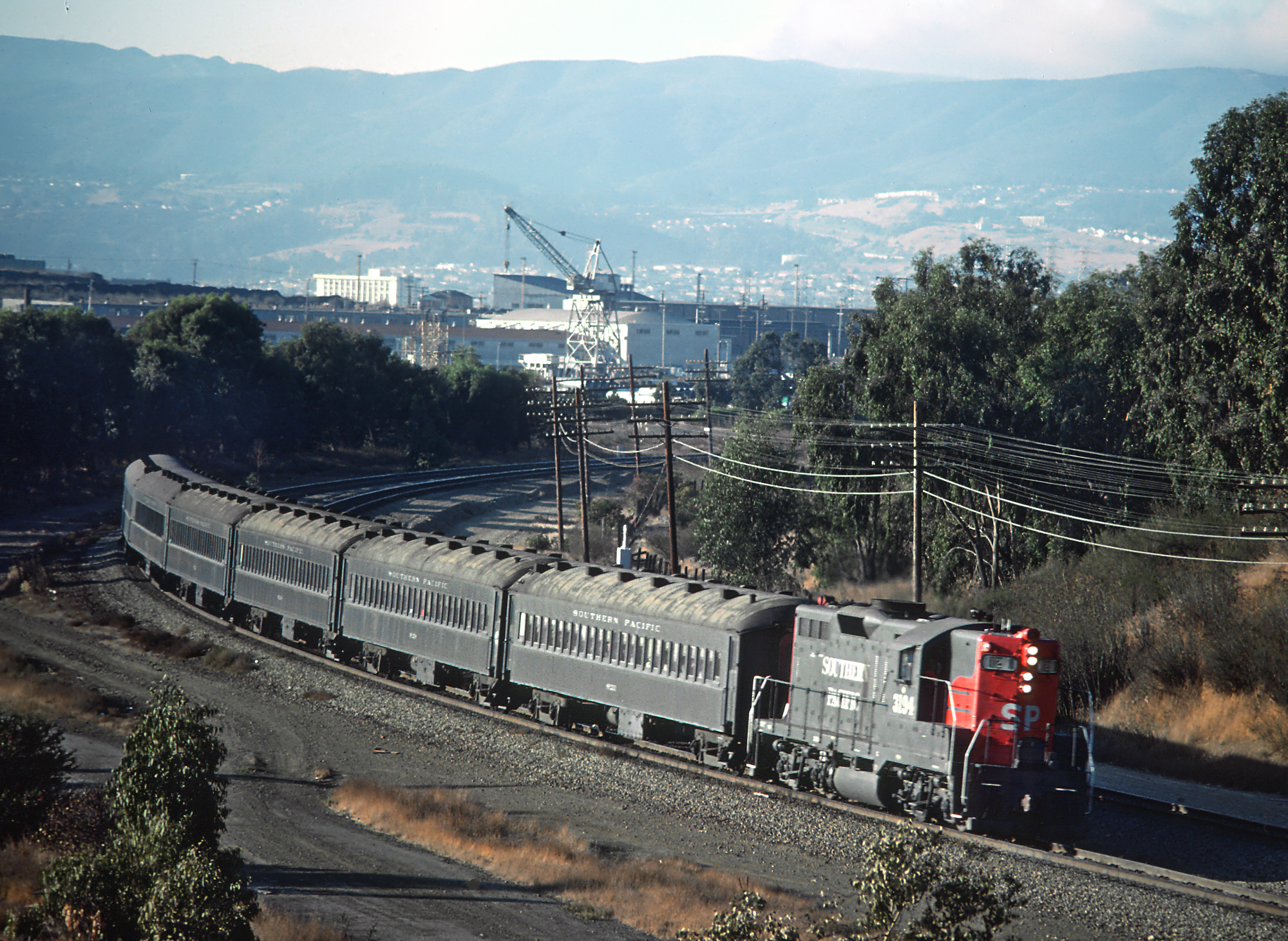
SP #3194 (EMD GP9) pulling six "Suburban" coaches past Oyster Point (November 1978)

The earlier wooden and steel-framed coaches were replaced with the all-steel 72-seat "Harriman" coaches starting in approximately 1900. SP introduced slightly longer all-steel 96-seat "Suburban" coaches in 1924, and continued to run them until the introduction of new state-owned equipment in 1985. The 1980 lease agreement between SP and the State of California showed a total of 83 passenger cars in revenue service: 27 operable "Suburbans", 10 "Suburbans" suitable for parts (nearly all "Suburbans" dating back to 1924), and 46 "Gallery" cars. As of 2017, several "Harriman" and "Suburban" coaches survive (including all 27 operable "Suburbans"); thirteen "Suburbans" are still in revenue service for the Grand Canyon Railway, while others are in use on the Niles Canyon Railway, Sacramento Southern Railroad, Western Railway Museum, among others.

SP rolled out Pullman-built "Gallery" cars with two passenger decks in 1955; passengers on the upper deck sat on two balconies along the sides of the car, and the center aisle was open to allow conductors to check tickets on both levels without having to ascend stairs.

A Streamline coach from the Daylight service was converted for Commute use in 1965 by adding five-abreast seating (one seat for two, and another seat for three across the aisle) for a total of 122 seats. It was not popular and was sold to the Stockton Terminal & Eastern in 1971. Instead, to increase passenger capacity, SP purchased a third flight of "Gallery" cars, delivered in 1968, which may be distinguished from the 1955/57 Gallery cars by a different window configuration.

"Gallery" and "Subs" could be mixed to make up multi-car consists. In 1978, a Commute train had from one to nine cars, and were always led by a locomotive, meaning the locomotive needed to be turned at each terminal. With the introduction of new state-owned locomotives and rolling stock in 1985 capable of push-pull service, locomotives no longer needed to be turned.

== Fares ==
Peninsula Commute Historical Prices (Note: Prices are One-way/Round Trip [Monthly]. Starting in 1973, no discount was applied to round trip tickets, which were priced at 2× the one-way fare, so round-trip prices are not shown for 1973 and later.)
Miles (Note: Original mileage based on western alignment)	Station (Note: Historical station names)	04 May 1884	25 Jun 1899	Miles (Note: Revised mileage based on the 1907 Bayshore cutoff route. Stations are coincident from San Bruno south to San Jose.)	Station	05 May 1938	27 Sep 1953	Zone (Note: Zones instituted some time prior to 1958 to simplify fare structure)	28 Sep 1958 (Note: Time tables prior to 1964 include the Vasona Branch line, listing prices (but not schedules) for destinations along branch line starting at Mayfield (California Ave) including Los Altos, Loyola, Simla, Monta Vista, Congress Jct. and terminating at Los Gatos.)	12 May 1968	22 Dec 1973	01 May 1976	01 Apr 1978
0.0	Townsend St	0.00 [0.00]	0.00 [0.00]	0.0	San Francisco	0.00 [0.00]	0.00 [0.00]	SF	0.00 [0.00]	0.00 [0.00]	0.00 [0.00]	0.00 [0.00]	0.95 [n/a]
3.4	Valencia St	0.00 [0.00]	0.00 [0.00]	1.9	23rd Street	0.00 [0.00]	0.00 [0.00]	SF	0.00 [0.00]	0.00 [0.00]	0.00 [0.00]	0.00 [0.00]	0.95 [n/a]
4.6	Bernal	0.15/0.30 [3.00]	0.00 [0.00]	4.1	Paul Avenue	0.00 [0.00]	0.00 [0.00]	SF	0.00 [0.00]	0.00 [0.00]	0.00 [0.00]	0.00 [0.00]	0.95 [n/a]
6.9	Ocean View (Note: Named San Miguel in 1879 timetable)	0.15/0.30 [4.00]	0.15/0.25 [3.00]	5.2	Bayshore	0.00 [0.00]	0.00 [0.00]	SF	0.00 [0.00]	0.00 [0.00]	0.00 [0.00]	0.00 [0.00]	0.95 [n/a]
9.2	Colma	0.25/0.40 [5.00]	0.25/0.40 [3.50]	8.6	Butler Road (Note: Butler Road moved between Zone 1 and SF several times.)	0.00 [0.00]	0.25/0.45 [8.00]	1	0.00 [0.00]	0.00 [0.00]	1.10 [27.00]	1.15 [29.25]	1.45 [36.55]
12.2	Baden	0.40/0.70 [6.00]	0.35/0.50 [4.50]	9.3	South San Francisco	0.20/0.35 [3.96]	0.25/0.45 [8.00]	1	0.50/0.90 [13.25]	0.70/1.30 [18.30]	1.10 [27.00]	1.15 [29.25]	1.45 [36.55]
14.3	San Bruno	0.50/0.90 [7.00]	0.40/0.50 [5.00]	11.6	San Bruno	0.20/0.40 [4.36]	0.30/0.55 [8.20]	1	0.50/0.90 [13.25]	0.70/1.30 [18.30]	1.10 [27.00]	1.15 [29.25]	1.45 [36.55]
—	—	N/A		12.x	Lomita Park (Note: Lomita Park was closed in the 1960s.)	0.20/0.40 [4.83]	0.34/0.65 [9.00]	1	0.50/0.90 [13.25]	N/A			
17.0	Millbrae	0.60/1.10 [8.00]	0.45/0.65 [5.50]	13.7	Millbrae	0.20/0.40 [5.42]	0.37/0.70 [10.20]	1	0.50/0.90 [13.25]	0.70/1.30 [18.30]	1.10 [27.00]	1.15 [29.25]	1.45 [36.55]
—	—	N/A		15.2	Broadway	0.25/0.45 [6.02]	0.42/0.80 [11.05]	2	0.60/1.10 [16.50]	0.90/1.65 [22.20]	1.30 [31.75]	1.35 [34.25]	1.70 [42.80]
19.2	Burlingame (Note: Named Oak Grove in the 1879 time table)	0.70/1.25 [8.50]	0.55/0.90 [5.75]	16.3	Burlingame	0.25/0.45 [6.47]	0.42/0.80 [11.75]	2	0.60/1.10 [16.50]	0.90/1.65 [22.20]	1.30 [31.75]	1.35 [34.25]	1.70 [42.80]
21.1	San Mateo	0.75/1.35 [9.00]	0.60/1.00 [6.00]	17.9	San Mateo	0.25/0.45 [7.07]	0.47/0.85 [12.90]	2	0.60/1.10 [16.50]	0.90/1.65 [22.20]	1.30 [31.75]	1.35 [34.25]	1.70 [42.80]
—	—	N/A		18.9	Hayward Park (Note: Leslie in the 1938 time tables)	0.35/0.57 [7.53]	0.50/0.90 [13.40]	2	0.60/1.10 [16.50]	0.90/1.65 [22.20]	1.30 [31.75]	1.35 [34.25]	1.70 [42.80]
24.x	Beresford	N/A	0.70/N/A [N/A] (Note: Round trip and single-rider monthly commutation not sold for Beresford. Family commutation sold for US$14.00 (equivalent to $541.8 in 2025), good for thirty one-way trips within six months.)	20.3	Hillsdale (Note: Beresford in the 1938 time tables)	0.35/0.57 [8.06]	0.55/1.00 [14.40]	3	0.77/1.45 [19.75]	1.10/1.95 [26.10]	1.60 [36.50]	1.70 [39.25]	2.10 [49.05]
25.1	Belmont	0.90/1.65 [10.00]	0.70/1.10 [7.00]	21.9	Belmont	0.40/0.59 [8.66]	0.59/1.10 [15.50]	3	0.77/1.45 [19.75]	1.10/1.95 [26.10]	1.60 [36.50]	1.70 [39.25]	2.10 [49.05]
27.x	San Carlos	N/A	0.75/1.25 [7.50]	23.2	San Carlos	0.45/0.69 [9.18]	0.59/1.10 [16.00]	3	0.77/1.45 [19.75]	1.10/1.95 [26.10]	1.60 [36.50]	1.70 [39.25]	2.10 [49.05]
28.6	Redwood City	1.00/1.85 [11.50]	0.80/1.25 [8.00]	25.4	Redwood City	0.50/0.75 [10.04]	0.67/1.25 [17.10]	3	0.77/1.45 [19.75]	1.10/1.95 [26.10]	1.60 [36.50]	1.70 [39.25]	2.10 [49.05]
30.9	Fair Oaks	1.10/2.00 [12.50]	0.90/1.50 [8.50]	27.8	Atherton	0.55/0.80 [11.03]	0.72/1.30 [18.35]	4	1.00/1.82 [23.00]	1.35/2.50 [30.00]	1.95 [41.25]	2.05 [44.25]	2.55 [55.30]
32.1	Menlo Park	1.15/2.10 [13.00]	0.95/1.50 [9.00]	28.9	Menlo Park	0.55/0.87 [11.43]	0.75/1.35 [19.10]	4	1.00/1.82 [23.00]	1.35/2.50 [30.00]	1.95 [41.25]	2.05 [44.25]	2.55 [55.30]
34.x	Palo Alto	N/A	0.95/1.50 [9.50]	30.1	Palo Alto	0.60/0.93 [11.96]	0.80/1.45 [19.35]	4	1.00/1.82 [23.00]	1.35/2.50 [30.00]	1.95 [41.25]	2.05 [44.25]	2.55 [55.30]
34.9	Mayfield	1.25/2.25 [14.00]	1.00/1.60 [10.00]	31.8	California Avenue (Note: Mayfield in the 1938 time tables)	0.65/0.98 [12.62]	0.84/1.55 [20.45]	4	1.00/1.82 [23.00]	1.35/2.50 [30.00]	1.95 [41.25]	2.05 [44.25]	2.55 [55.30]
38.x	Castro	N/A	1.10/N/A [N/A] (Note: Round trip and single-rider monthly commutation not sold for Castros. Family commutation sold for US$22.00 (equivalent to $851.4 in 2025), good for thirty one-way trips within six months.)	34.8	Castro	0.70/1.10 [13.80]	0.87/1.60 [21.75]	5	1.18/2.14 [26.50]	1.60/2.85 [34.20]	2.25 [46.25]	2.40 [49.50]	3.00 [61.90]
39.1	Mountain View	1.40/2.55 [16.00]	1.15/1.75 [11.00]	36.1	Mountain View	0.74/1.10 [14.33]	0.92/1.70 [22.55]	5	1.18/2.14 [26.50]	1.60/2.85 [34.20]	2.25 [46.25]	2.40 [49.50]	3.00 [61.90]
41.9	Murphys	N/A	1.25/N/A [N/A] (Note: Round trip and single-rider monthly commutation not sold for Murphys. Family commutation sold for US$25.00 (equivalent to $967.5 in 2025), good for thirty one-way trips within six months.)	38.8	Sunnyvale	0.80/1.23 [15.39]	1.00/1.80 [23.30]	5	1.18/2.14 [26.50]	1.60/2.85 [34.20]	2.25 [46.25]	2.40 [49.50]	3.00 [61.90]
47.4	Santa Clara	1.65/3.05 [19.00]	1.25/2.00 [14.00]	44.3	Santa Clara	0.90/1.40 [17.56]	1.12/2.05 [25.55]	6	1.32/2.36 [28.50]	1.75/3.10 [36.60]	2.40 [49.25]	2.55 [52.75]	3.20 [65.95]
49.6	College Park	N/A	1.25/N/A [N/A] (Note: Round trip and single-rider monthly commutation not sold for College Park. Family commutation sold for US$25.00 (equivalent to $967.5 in 2025), good for thirty one-way trips within six months.)	45.7	College Park	0.94/1.47 [18.09]	1.17/2.15 [26.35]	6	1.32/2.36 [28.50]	1.75/3.10 [36.60]	2.40 [49.25]	2.55 [52.75]	3.20 [65.95]
50.0	San Jose Market	1.75/3.25 [20.00]	1.25/2.00 [15.00]	46.9	San Jose Diridon	0.97/1.52 [18.62]	1.19/2.15 [26.50]	6	1.32/2.36 [28.50]	1.75/3.10 [36.60]	2.40 [49.25]	2.55 [52.75]	3.20 [65.95]
Notes

Peninsula residents clamored for lower fares as early as 1908; SP officials replied by pointing out rates were already cheaper than similar services in New York, Boston, Philadelphia, Chicago, and Baltimore. A discount 10-ride ticket was introduced in 1909 to partially defray rates for frequent commuters. In 1910, SP added that rates across the Bay were comparable, and maintenance of the line between San Francisco and San Jose, partially paid by fares, was expensive. Although SP purchased the electric railway connecting Palo Alto and San Jose, bringing hope that it would be extended further north, it turned out the purchase was merely a strategy to eliminate competition.

When fares began to be regulated in 1912, associations in Peninsula cities and Santa Clara County filed complaints against SP, citing rates that were significantly higher than fares to Alameda County destinations of similar distance. The higher rates to Peninsula destinations was believed to cause slow growth of properties on the Peninsula. The suit was heard on August 26, 1912, and after it became clear that many cities felt the rates were excessive and that a rate cut would happen, SP asked for a continuance to put together a compromise.

Also in 1912, SP proposed that private club cars be provided on several morning trains to allow commuters to "enjoy a shave or shampoo and indulge in convival highball while making their daily trips to San Francisco."

== See also ==
- Amtrak
- BART
- Caltrain
