= Southern Pacific GS-2 class =

Class of 6 American 4-8-4 locomotives

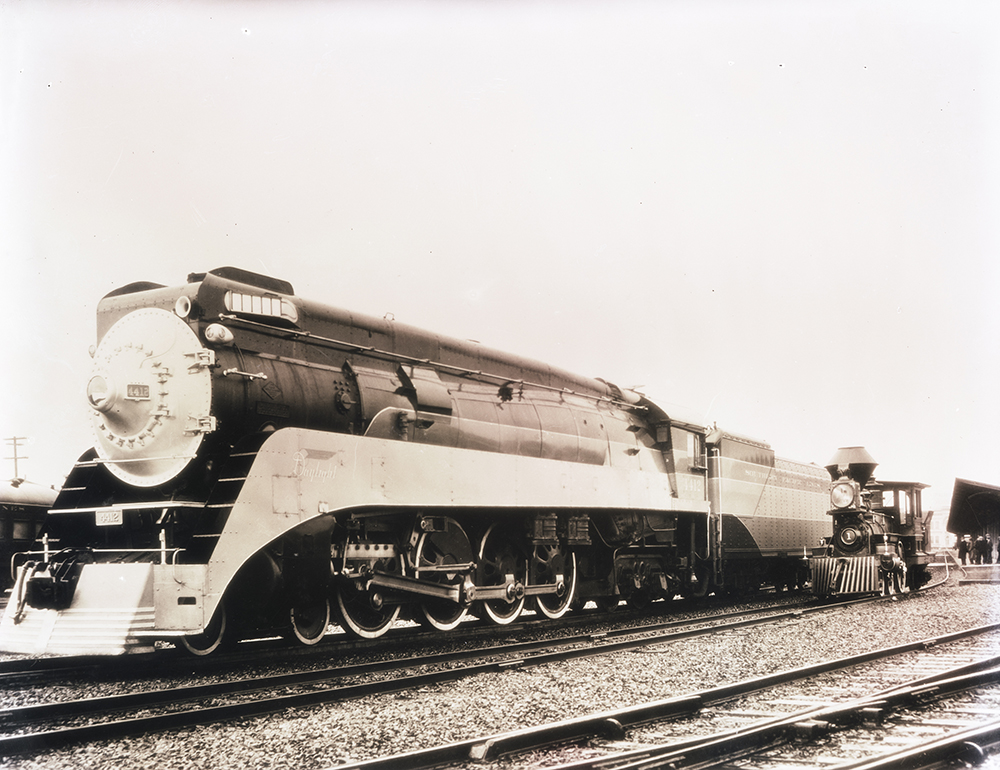
- Southern Pacific GS-2 No. 4412 with the C. P. Huntington locomotive in December 1936
Type and origin
- Power type: Steam
- Builder: Lima Locomotive Works
- Serial number: 7646–7651
- Build date: December 1936
- Total produced: 6
Specifications
- Configuration
  - Whyte: 4-8-4
  - UIC: 2′D2′ h2
- Gauge: 4 ft 8 1/2 in (1,435 mm) standard gauge
- Leading dia.: 36 in (914 mm)
- Driver dia.: 73 1/2 in (1,867 mm)
- Trailing dia.: 45 1/2 in (1,156 mm)
- Axle load: 67,000 lb (30,000 kilograms; 30 metric tons)
- Adhesive weight: 266,500 lb (120,900 kg; 120.9 t)
- Loco weight: 448,400 lb (203,400 kg; 203.4 t)
- Total weight: 821,400 lb (372,600 kg; 372.6 t)
- Fuel type: Fuel oil
- Fuel capacity: 6,010 US gal (22,800 L; 5,000 imp gal)
- Water cap.: 22,000 US gal (83,000 L; 18,000 imp gal)
- Firebox
  - Grate area: 90.2 sq ft (8.38 m^{2})
- Boiler pressure: 250 psi (1.72 MPa)
- Heating surface: 4,858 sq ft (451.3 m^{2})
- Superheater
  - Heating area: 2,565 sq ft (238.3 m^{2})
- Cylinders: Two, outside
- Cylinder size: 27 in × 30 in (686 mm × 762 mm)
- Valve gear: Walschaerts
Performance figures
- Maximum speed: At least 90 mph (145 km/h)
- Power output: 4500hp at 55 mph (89 km/h)
- Tractive effort: 62,200 lbf (276.68 kN), 75,950 lbf (337.84 kN) with booster
Career
- Operators: Southern Pacific
- Class: GS-2
- Numbers: 4410–4415
- First run: January 1937
- Retired: 1955-1958
- Disposition: All scrapped

The GS-2 was a class of streamlined 4-8-4 "Northern" type steam locomotive operated by the Southern Pacific Railroad (SP) from 1937 to 1958. A total of six were built by the Lima Locomotive Works, numbered 4410 through 4415. GS stands for "Golden State" or "General Service."

== History ==
The GS-2s had a very different appearance than that of their predecessors, the GS-1s. The GS-2s were streamlined and designed by Southern Pacific Company for high-speed passenger service in 1935. They featured a silver smokebox with a cone-shaped single headlight casing, skyline casing on the top of the boiler, skirting on the sides, and an air horn. They retained the teardrop classification lights and whistles of the GS-1. They had 73.5 inches drivers and could develop 4500 horsepower at 55 mph with a maximum speed of 90 mph. The tenders were rectangular and had two independent tanks: a 6010-gallon fuel oil tank, and a 22,000-gallon water tank. Access to the open cab was by two ladders attached to the front of the tender.

They were the first locomotives to receive the silver, black, red, and orange Daylight paint scheme designed by Charles L. Eggleston of the Southern Pacific, and were used for the streamlined debut of Southern Pacific's premier passenger train, the Coast Daylight, in 1937. The following year they were replaced by the improved GS-3 engines. During World War II, they were painted black and silver and were used to transport troops. In the 1950s their side skirting was removed for easier maintenance, and the locomotives were assigned to general service, such as the San Jose-San Francisco Peninsula Commute service, the "Coast Mail" trains, and freight service.

GS-2 locomotive details
Road number	Built date	Serial number	First run date	Retirement date	Disposal date	Notes
4410	December 1936	7646	January 14, 1937	May 14, 1956	June 6, 1956	Sold for scrap at National Metals in Los Angeles.
4411	December 1936	7647	January 15, 1937	February 8, 1956	April 20, 1956	Scrapped in Sacramento, California.
4412	December 1936	7648	January 16, 1937	December 3, 1956	December 21, 1956	Scrapped in Sacramento, California.
4413	December 1936	7649	January 16, 1937	February 8, 1955	May 16, 1955	Sold for scrap at Luria Brothers in Los Angeles.
4414	December 1936	7650	January 21, 1937	November 24, 1954	January 14, 1955	Scrapped in Sacramento, California.
4415	December 1936	7651	January 26, 1937	February 17, 1958	November 3, 1958	Sold to the Purdy Company for scrap in South San Francisco, California.

== Bibliography ==
- Johnsen, Kenneth G. (2006). Southern Pacific Daylight Steam Locomotives (1st ed.). Specialty Press. ISBN 978-1-58007-098-0.
- Solomon, Brian (2005). Southern Pacific Passenger Trains. Great Passenger Trains (1st ed.). Voyageur Press. ISBN 0-7603-1795-X.
