= Southern Pacific GS-3 class =

Class of 14 American 4-8-4 locomotives

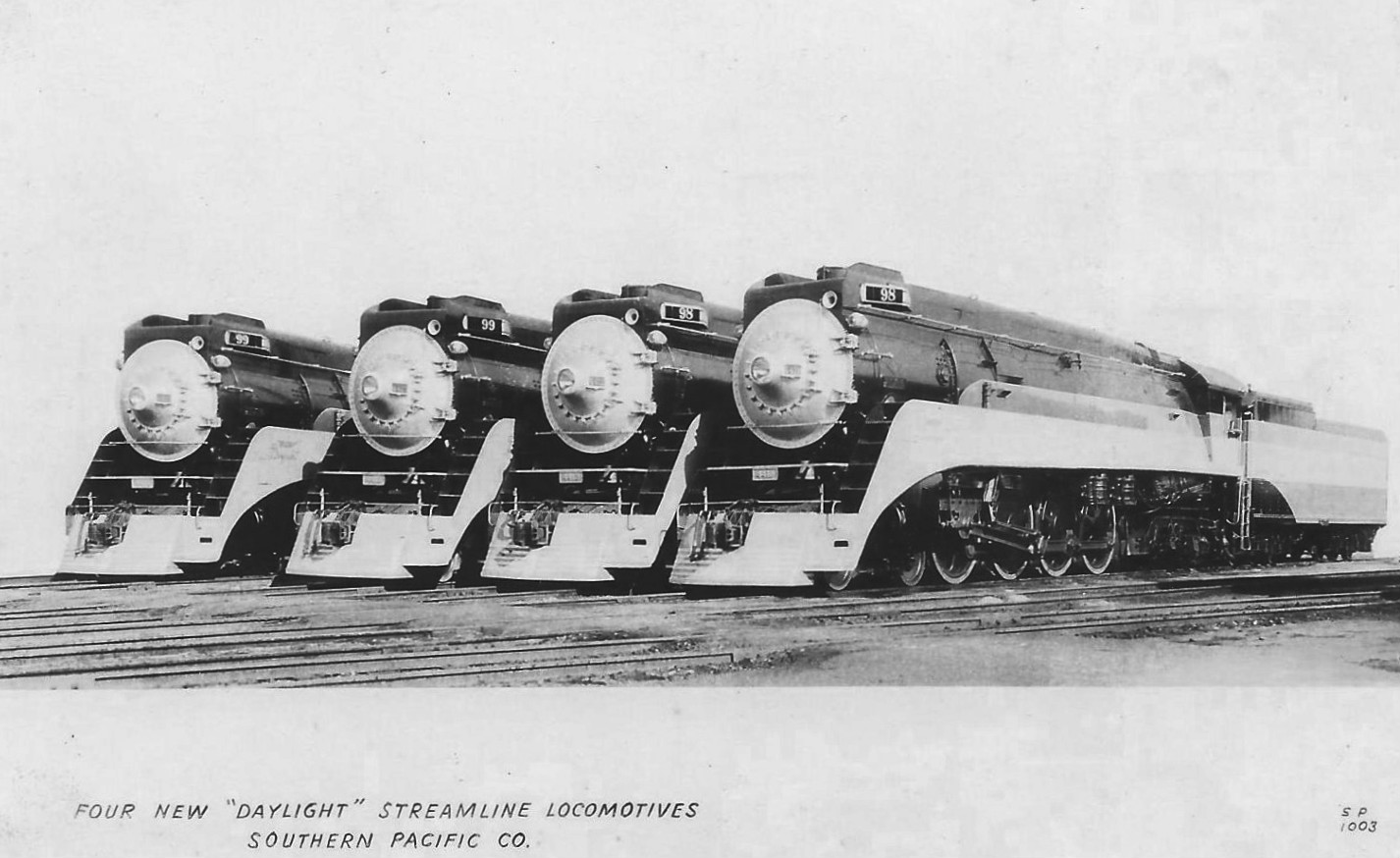
- Southern Pacific's four new GS-3 locomotives Nos. 4416-4419 in 1937
Type and origin
- Power type: Steam
- Builder: Lima Locomotive Works
- Serial number: 7721–7734
- Build date: October–December 1937
- Total produced: 14
Specifications
- Configuration
  - Whyte: 4-8-4
  - UIC: 2′D2′ h2
- Gauge: 4 ft 8 1/2 in (1,435 mm) standard gauge
- Leading dia.: 36 in (914 mm)
- Driver dia.: 80 in (2,032 mm)
- Trailing dia.: 45 1/2 in (1,156 mm)
- Height: 16 ft 4 in (4.98 m)
- Axle load: 67,000 lb (30,000 kilograms; 30 metric tons)
- Adhesive weight: 267,300 lb (121,200 kg; 121.2 t)
- Loco weight: 460,000 lb (210,000 kg; 210 t)
- Tender weight: 358,880 lb (162,790 kg; 162.79 t)
- Total weight: 818,880 lb (371,440 kg; 371.44 t)
- Fuel type: Fuel oil
- Fuel capacity: 6,010 US gal (22,800 L; 5,000 imp gal)
- Water cap.: 22,000 US gal (83,000 L; 18,000 imp gal)
- Firebox
  - Grate area: 90.4 sq ft (8.40 m^{2})
- Boiler pressure: 280 psi (1.93 MPa)
- Heating surface: 4,890 sq ft (454 m^{2})
- Superheater
  - Heating area: 2,565 sq ft (238.3 m^{2})
- Cylinders: Two, outside
- Cylinder size: 26 in × 32 in (660 mm × 813 mm)
Performance figures
- Maximum speed: At least 106 mph (171 km/h)
- Power output: 5,000 hp (3,700 kW) at 60 mph (97 km/h)
- Tractive effort: 62,800 lbf (279.35 kN), 76,650 lbf (340.96 kN) with booster
Career
- Operators: Southern Pacific
- Class: GS-3
- Numbers: 4416–4429
- First run: November–December 1937
- Retired: 1954-1958
- Disposition: All scrapped

The GS-3 was a class of streamlined 4-8-4 "Northern" type steam locomotive operated by the Southern Pacific Railroad (SP) from 1938 to 1957. A total of fourteen were built by the Lima Locomotive Works, numbered 4416 through 4429. GS stands for "Golden State" or "General Service."

== History ==
The popularity of the Southern Pacific Coast Daylight trains was overwhelming and prompted the Southern Pacific to initiate plans to introduce several new streamlined, lightweight trains: the Noon Daylight, the San Joaquin Daylight, and the Lark. A second order for 14 additional Daylight engines was placed with Lima Locomotive Works. All engines were set up upon delivery at El Paso, Texas. Number 4416 was the first and was set up on November 3, 1937. Number 4429 was last and set up on December 30, 1937. The GS-3 had an appearance similar to the GS-2. They featured a silver smokebox with a cone-shaped single headlight casing, skyline casing on the top of the boiler, skirting on the sides, an air horn to supplement the whistle, and teardrop classification lights. The only significant difference in appearance was the increase in driver size.

They received the orange and red "Daylight" paint scheme. They were primarily used on Southern Pacific's premier passenger train at the time, the Coast Daylight. In later years after being replaced by newer GS-4 class engines, they were painted black, had their side skirting removed for easier maintenance, and were reassigned to San Jose-San Francisco Peninsula Commute service, freight service, and made occasional appearances on the San Joaquin Daylight.

GS-3 locomotive details
Road number	Built date	Serial number	First run date	Retirement date	Disposal date	Notes
4416	October 1937	7721	November 3, 1937	April 5, 1955	June 1, 1955	Sold for scrap at Luria Brothers in Los Angeles.
4417	October 1937	7722	November 9, 1937	August 13, 1956	October 29, 1956	Scrapped in Sacramento, California.
4418	October 1937	7723	November 9, 1937	December 10, 1957	December 12, 1958	Sold for scrap at Purdy Company in Los Angeles.
4419	October 1937	7724	November 16, 1937	May 25, 1955	July 20, 1955	Sold for scrap at Luria Brothers in Los Angeles.
4420	October 1937	7725	November 16, 1937	May 21, 1958	May 7, 1959	Sold for scrap to National Metals in Los Angeles.
4421	November 1937	7726	November 23, 1937	September 24, 1958	May 7, 1959	Sold for scrap at National Metals in Los Angeles.
4422	November 1937	7727	November 26, 1937	November 29, 1957	May 20, 1959	Sold for scrap at Purdy Company in Los Angeles.
4423	November 1937	7728	December 1, 1937	December 28, 1954	January 21, 1955	Scrapped in Sacramento, California.
4424	November 1937	7729	December 7, 1937	September 19, 1955	November 4, 1955	Scrapped in Sacramento, California.
4425	November 1937	7730	December 7, 1937	May 14, 1956	July 13, 1956	Scrapped in Los Angeles.
4426	November 1937	7731	December 18, 1937	June 12, 1956	July 18, 1956	Sold for scrap at Luria Brothers in Richmond, California.
4427	December 1937	7732	December 21, 1937	February 8, 1955	February 25, 1955	Sold for scrap at Luria Brothers in Los Angeles.
4428	December 1937	7733	December 29, 1937	September 24, 1958	April 24, 1959	Sold for scrap at Luria Brothers in Los Angeles.
4429	December 1937	7734	December 30, 1937	February 8, 1955	April 7, 1955	Scrapped in Sacramento, California.

== Preservation ==
After retirement in 1957, all GS-3s were scrapped. However, one wheel from No. 4422, the first axle, right side, was rescued just before scrapping by William B. Fletcher. It was donated to the RailGiants Train Museum at the Los Angeles County Fairgrounds in Pomona, California where it is on display.

== Accident ==
On December 31, 1944, GS-3 4425 was hauling the Pacific Limited passenger train westbound near Bagley, Weber County, Utah when it was run into from behind by Mt-4 4361, pulling a mail express train. The first train had slowed because of a freight train ahead of it, but the second train's crew failed to see the signal in thick fog and collided with the first train at 50 mph. 50 people were killed and 81 injured in the disaster.

== Bibliography ==
- Johnsen, Kenneth G. (2006). Southern Pacific Daylight Steam Locomotives (1st ed.). Specialty Press. ISBN 978-1-58007-098-0.
