= Hillsdale station (Caltrain) =

Train station in San Mateo, California, U.S.

Hillsdale
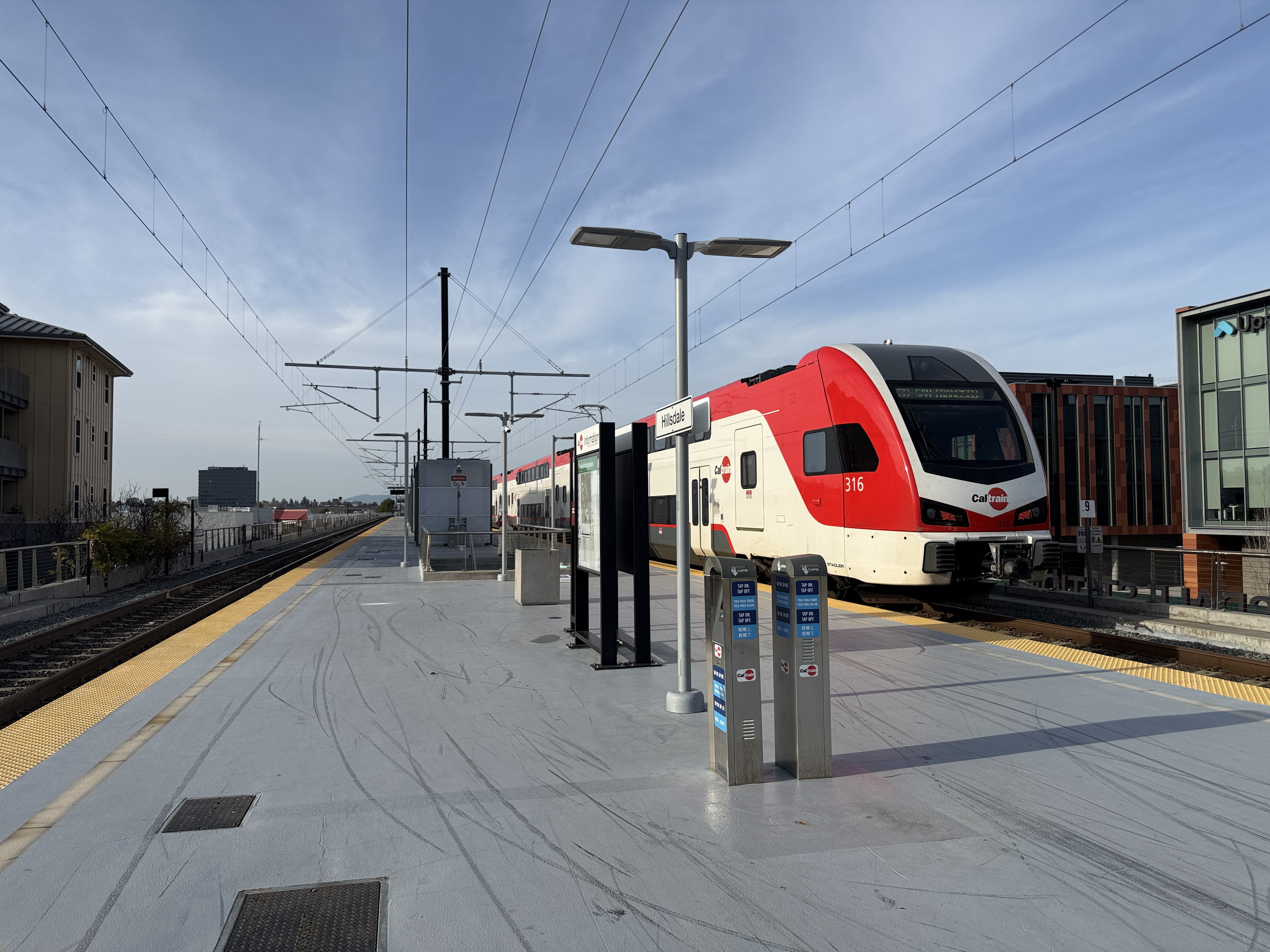
- A northbound train in January 2026

General information
- Location: 50 East 28th Avenue; San Mateo, California
- Coordinates: 37°32′31″N 122°18′4″W
- Owner: Peninsula Corridor Joint Powers Board (PCJPB)
- Line: PCJPB Peninsula Subdivision
- Platforms: 1 island platform
- Tracks: 2
- Connections: Commute.org shuttles: Campus Drive, Lincoln Centre, Mariners' Island, Norfolk, Redwood City Bayshore Technology Park; Oracle shuttle; Samtrans: ECR, 57, 250, 251, 292, 294, 295, 397

Construction
- Structure type: Elevated
- Parking: Available
- Cycle facilities: Racks and lockers
- Accessible: Yes

Other information
- Fare zone: 2

History
- Opened: 1901
- Rebuilt: April 26, 2021

Passengers
- FY 2025: 1,596 (weekday avg.) ▲32%

Services
| Preceding station | Caltrain | Following station |
|---|---|---|
| Hayward Park toward San Francisco | Local | Belmont toward San Jose Diridon or Tamien |
| San Mateo toward San Francisco | Limited | Redwood City toward San Jose Diridon |
| San Mateo toward San Francisco | Express | Redwood City toward San Jose Diridon |
| Hayward Park toward San Francisco | Weekend Local | Belmont toward San Jose Diridon or Tamien |
Former services
| Preceding station | Caltrain | Following station |
|---|---|---|
| Hayward Park toward San Francisco | Local (L1) | Belmont toward San Jose Diridon or Tamien |
| Hayward Park toward San Francisco | Weekend Local (L2) | Belmont toward San Jose Diridon or Tamien |
| Millbrae toward San Francisco | Limited (L3) | Belmont toward San Jose Diridon, Tamien or Gilroy |
| San Mateo toward San Francisco | Limited (L5) | Redwood City toward San Jose Diridon or Tamien |
| Millbrae toward San Francisco | Baby Bullet (B7) | Redwood City toward San Jose Diridon |
| Preceding station | Southern Pacific Railroad | Following station |
| Hayward Park toward San Francisco | Coast Line | Belmont toward Los Angeles |
| Hayward Park toward San Francisco | Peninsula Commute | Belmont toward San Jose |
Location

Hillsdale station is a Caltrain station in San Mateo, California. Located adjacent to the Bay Meadows neighborhood, it is one of three Caltrain stations in the city. The elevated station has a single island platform serving the two tracks of the Peninsula Subdivision. It opened in 2021 as part of a grade crossing elimination project, replacing a previous station slightly to the south.

== History ==
=== Bay Meadows station ===
Until it was closed on December 20, 2005, the Bay Meadows Racetrack was served by the now-removed Bay Meadows stop, slightly less than a half-mile (800 m) north of the original location of the Hillsdale Station. The Bay Meadows stop lacked a passenger shelter, and was basically just an opening in the chain link fencing where riders could access the grandstand parking lot. When Hillsdale was redesigned and relocated, its new platform was extended a few hundred feet north, eliminating any need for the separate station. Hillsdale is now the closest station to the former racetrack area.

=== Relocation ===
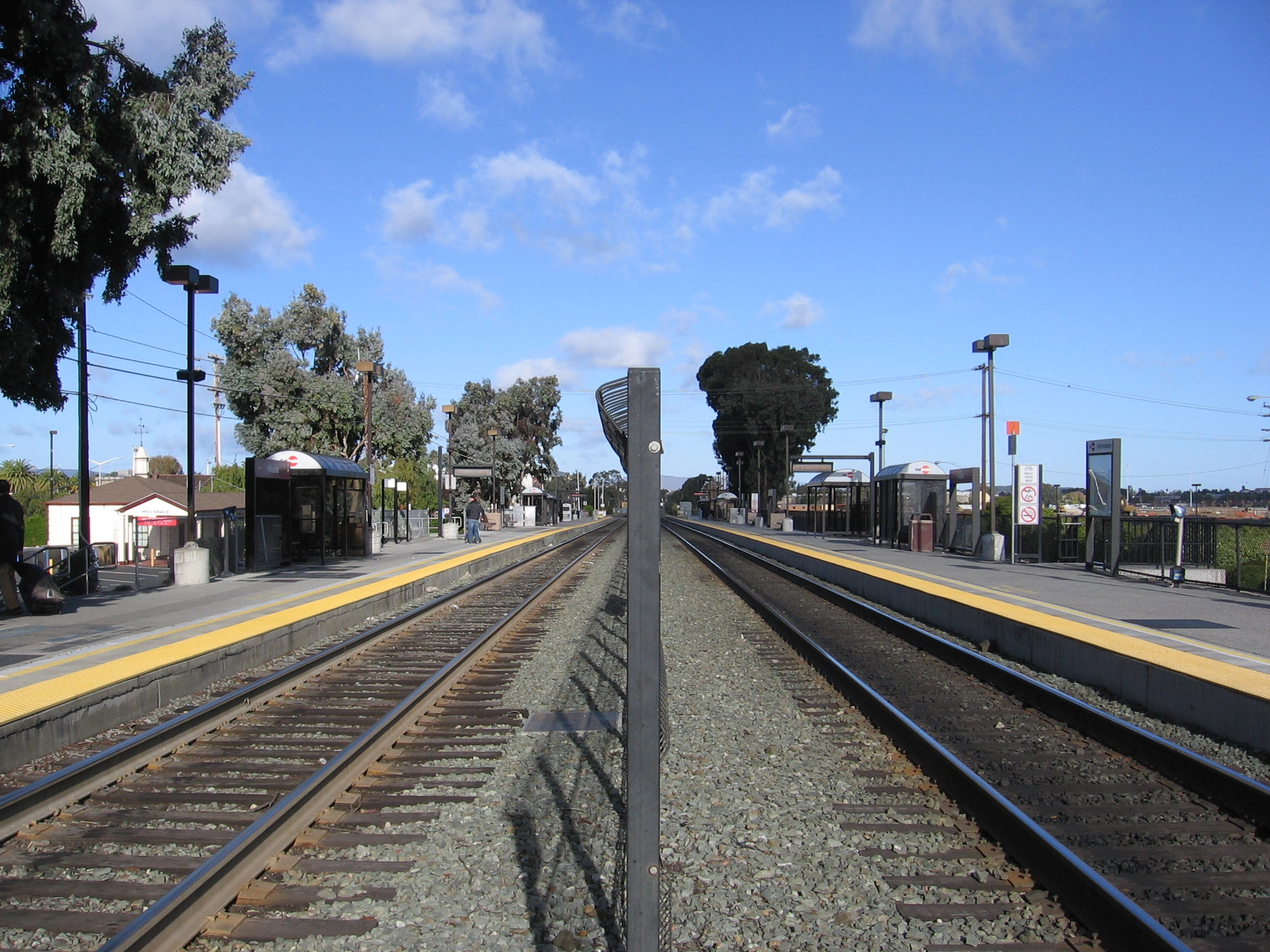
Hillsdale station in 2012

The City of San Mateo applied for Measure A funds to help fund a grade separation project in 2013; the majority of the $180 million project is funded from Measure A ($74 M) and Proposition 1A ($84 million, California High Speed Rail). The 25th Avenue Grade Separation Project elevated tracks in southern San Mateo, eliminating the at-grade crossing at 25th Avenue and adding grade-separated crossings at 28th and 31st Avenues, which previously had been interrupted by Peninsula Corridor tracks. Tracks now rise at the maximum allowable grade, starting from where they emerge south of the State Route 92 overcrossing, minimizing the depression required on 25th Avenue to maintain vertical clearance for road vehicles under the new rail bridge. The grade separation was also designed to accommodate a potential mid-line overtake required for Caltrain/HSR blended operations, which would expand the Peninsula Corridor right-of-way to up to four tracks. PCJPB awarded an $82.9 million construction contract to the Shimmick/Disney Joint Venture in July 2017.

As part of the grade separation project, Hillsdale station was relocated to the north. An initial design called for a station just north of 31st Avenue, with a transit center plaza and parking garage west of the tracks. The final design has the station straddling 28th Avenue, closer to the transit-oriented development at Bay Meadows, approximately 1,590 ft (480 m) to the north of the original station building. Preliminary renderings showed the new Hillsdale station with an island platform generally extending south from 28th, with parking provided east of the tracks. A ceremonial groundbreaking for the grade separation project was held on September 26, 2017. Construction of the grade separations began in fall 2017 and originally was scheduled to complete in spring 2021. The grade separation included five new rail bridges: one at Borel Creek (completed by late 2018); three to separate road traffic, installed in 2019 over 25th (July), 28th (September), and 31st (October); and a pedestrian underpass between 28th and 31st. Rail traffic was redirected over the bridges starting on May 28, 2020.

The existing parking lot at Hillsdale was closed in 2018, and a temporary lot, accessible from 28th, 31st, and Delaware, served Hillsdale. After construction of the new Hillsdale station was completed, that temporary lot was upgraded to serve as the new permanent lot. In its final configuration, there are two lots east of the tracks; vehicle access to both the north lot (between 25th and 28th) and south lot (between 28th and 31st) is available from 28th, and there is an additional access point from 25th for the north lot. Passengers can connect to SamTrans buses along El Camino Real.

The station was temporarily closed on May 16, 2020 and initially was scheduled to reopen in fall 2020. The project, initially estimated to cost $180 million, had a cost overrun of $25.9 million due to delays. The 28th Avenue grade separation opened on March 1, 2021; with its opening, the at-grade crossing at 25th was closed. The station ultimately reopened at its new location on April 26, 2021. Later that year, 25th Avenue reopened on August 2, and 31st opened on August 27.
