= Kenwood station (California) =

Kenwood
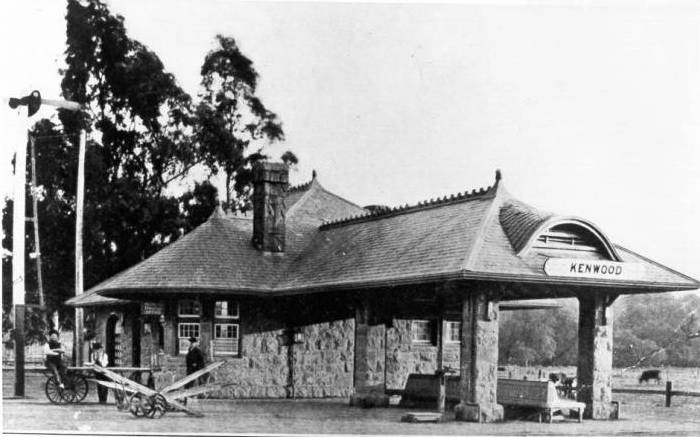
- The station building, c. 1907

General information
- Location: 314 Warm Springs Road; Kenwood, California
- Coordinates: 38.410383°N 122.550137°W
- Owner: Southern Pacific (1887–1940); Kenwood Community Club (1940–present)

History
- Opened: 1887
- Closed: 1936
- Former names: South Los Guilicos

Services
Preceding station	Southern Pacific Railroad	Following station
Los Guilicos toward Santa Rosa	Santa Rosa Branch	Wildwood toward Schellville
Location

Kenwood Depot was a railway station in Kenwood, California. It opened in 1887 as South Los Guilicos, and shares some features with the San Carlos station on the San Francisco Peninsula which was built around the same time. The station building was the only stone depot constructed for the Santa Rosa and Carquinez Railroad and cost $11,500 (equivalent to $412,083 in 2025) — tracks were on the east side. The station's name was changed to Kenwood in 1895 with the rest of the town. Rail service continued until 1936, and the rail line was removed in 1942. In 1940, Southern Pacific sold the depot to the Kenwood Improvement Club for $500 (equivalent to $11,490 in 2025) and it was converted into a community center. It was designated a Sonoma County Historic Landmark in 1980.
