= Atherton station =

Closed Caltrain rail station

Atherton
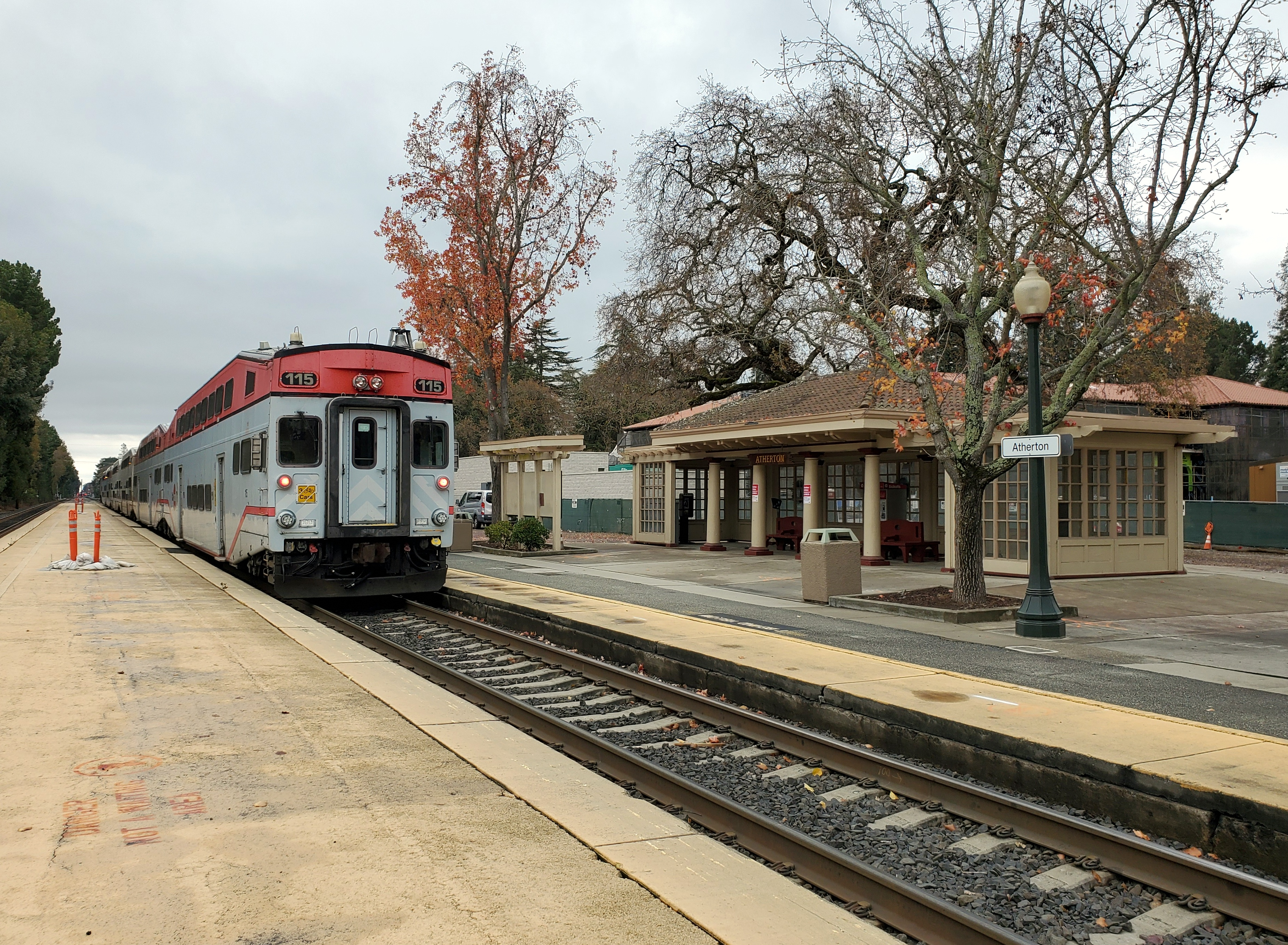
- A southbound train at Atherton station in December 2020

General information
- Location: 1 Dinkelspiel Station Lane; Atherton, California
- Coordinates: 37°27′51″N 122°11′50″W
- Owner: Peninsula Corridor Joint Powers Board (PCJPB)
- Line: PCJPB Peninsula Subdivision
- Platforms: 1 side platform, 1 island platform
- Tracks: 2

Other information
- Fare zone: 3

History
- Opened: c. 1866
- Closed: December 19, 2020
- Rebuilt: 1913, 1954, 1990
- Former names: Fair Oaks (until 1912)

Passengers
- 2019: 114 (daily average)

Former services
Preceding station	Caltrain	Following station
Redwood City toward San Francisco	Local Weekends and holidays only, until 2020	Menlo Park toward San Jose Diridon
Preceding station	Southern Pacific Railroad	Following station
Redwood City toward San Francisco	Coast Line	Menlo Park toward Los Angeles
San Carlos toward San Francisco	Del Monte Until 1971	Palo Alto toward Monterey
Location

Atherton station was a Caltrain station in Atherton, California, United States. The station building is now the Atherton Train Station Museum. The station opened by the Southern Pacific Railroad in 1866 as Fair Oaks and was renamed Atherton in 1912. The station had one side platform and one island platform serving the two tracks of the Peninsula Subdivision, with a concrete and wooden shelter on the west side of the tracks. Caltrain cut weekday service to the station in 2005 due to low ridership and a hold-out rule that prohibited two trains from being at the station simultaneously. Weekend and holiday service continued until December 19, 2020.

== History ==
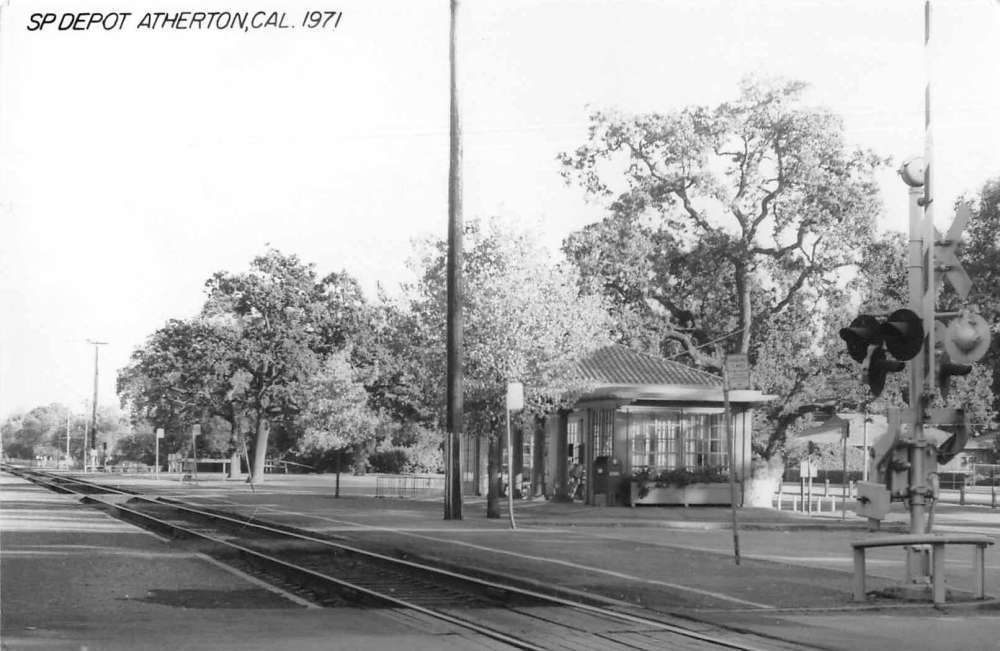
Atherton station in 1971

The San Francisco and San Jose Railroad opened from San Francisco to Mayfield in 1863, and to San Jose the next year. A flag stop at Fair Oaks was in use by 1866. The Southern Pacific Railroad (SP) took over the line in 1870. The station was renamed Atherton after Faxon Atherton in 1912, eleven years prior to the incorporation of the town under that name.

The SP replaced the original wooden shelter with a larger shelter in 1913. The new structure had a terra cotta tile roof with redwood framing supported by Tuscan concrete columns. Three sides were enclosed by glass in 1916, and the fourth by 1939. Glass-walled extensions were added in 1954, with the track-facing side of the original shelter again open. It is reportedly the only glass-walled train station building extant.

Atherton was served by the Del Monte until 1971; SP Peninsula Commute service was taken over by Caltrain in the 1980s. The station was surveyed in 1983 for potential inclusion on the National Register of Historic Places; it was ruled ineligible due to the 1954 modifications. The shelter was rebuilt in 1990; all materials except the concrete columns were replaced. The structure was briefly painted in SP yellow, but quickly repainted in a muted beige due to resident complaints. The portion of the station platform north of the Fair Oaks Lane grade crossing was abandoned at that time so that stopped trains would not block the crossing. The building was damaged by a fire in the 1990s and another in April 2007.

Weekday service to Atherton station was discontinued in 2005, with Caltrain citing low ridership, operational challenges, and the need to save money due to a projected budget shortfall. In February 2005, just before weekday service was discontinued, the station saw fewer than 122 passenger boardings per day. Due to the older narrow center platform configuration, the station was subject to a hold-out rule, preventing other trains from stopping or passing through when a train was serving the station. Caltrain offered a shuttle bus from Atherton station to Redwood City station; it was discontinued on July 1, 2007, due to low ridership.

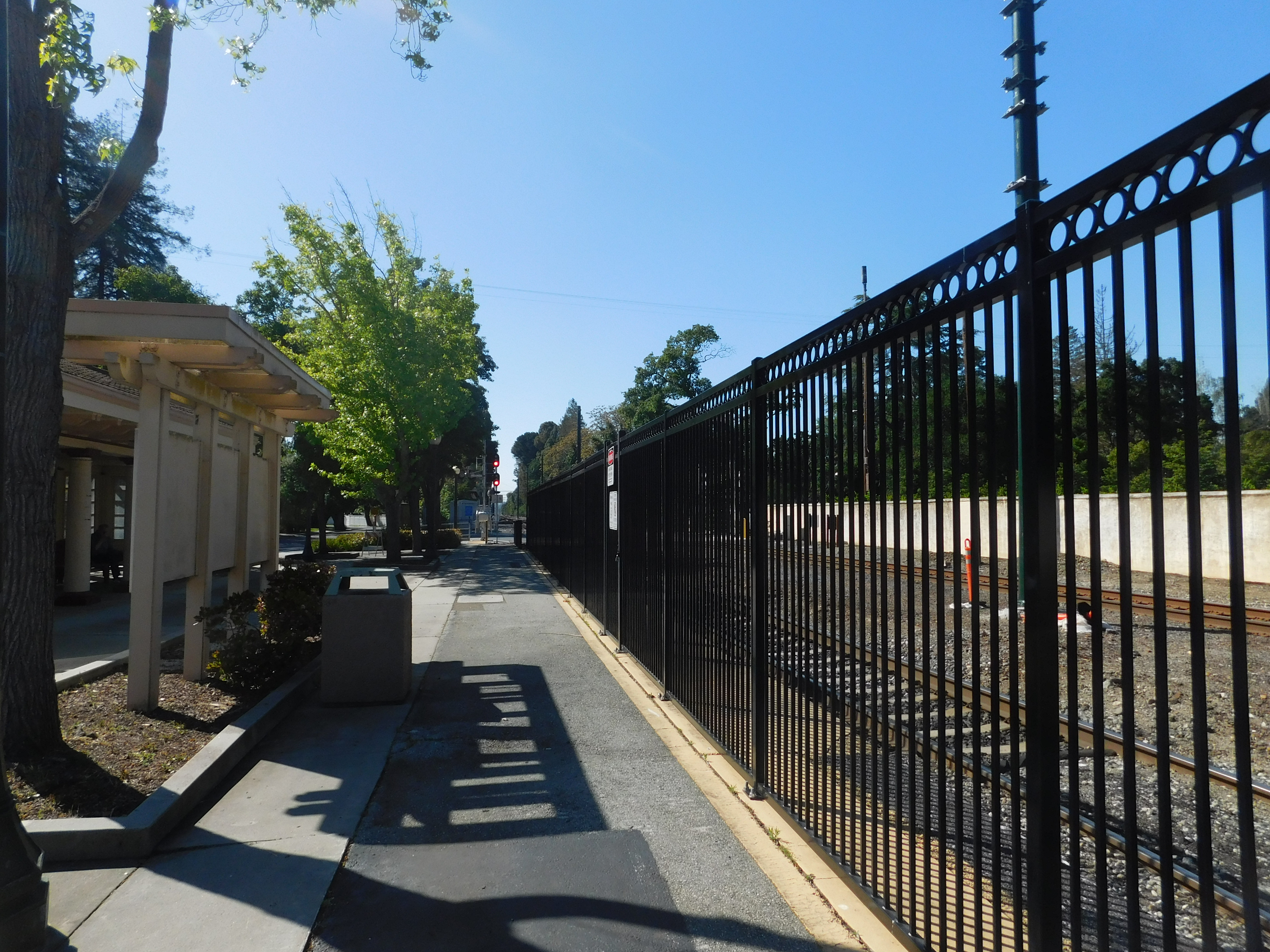
Atherton station in May 2023, after closing

In July 2017, Caltrain committed to restoring weekday service once electrification of the corridor had been completed. However, on January 8, 2020, Caltrain proposed permanently closing the station. The town of Atherton tentatively endorsed the proposal on January 15. The station would have required a $30 million renovation to build side platforms to allow the hold out rule to be removed. On November 5, the town of Atherton and the Caltrain Board came to an agreement to permanently close the station. The final day of service to Atherton station was Sunday, December 13, 2020; a schedule change on December 14 eliminated service to Atherton effective the weekend of December 19–20. Caltrain undertook to remove the station's center boarding platform, install a fence along the right-of-way, and install new four-quadrant crossing gates at Watkins Avenue. At the town's request, trains no longer sound their horns when passing through Atherton.

Using a $400,000 refurbishment grant from Caltrain and a $50,000 grant from the town of Atherton, the building was restored and converted into a museum, the Atherton Train Station Museum, which was formally opened on October 18, 2026. A major reason for the closure of the station was to prevent rezonong of the city of Atherton, so the city could retain its exclusive residential character.
