= San Carlos station =

Train station in San Carlos, California, U.S.

San Carlos
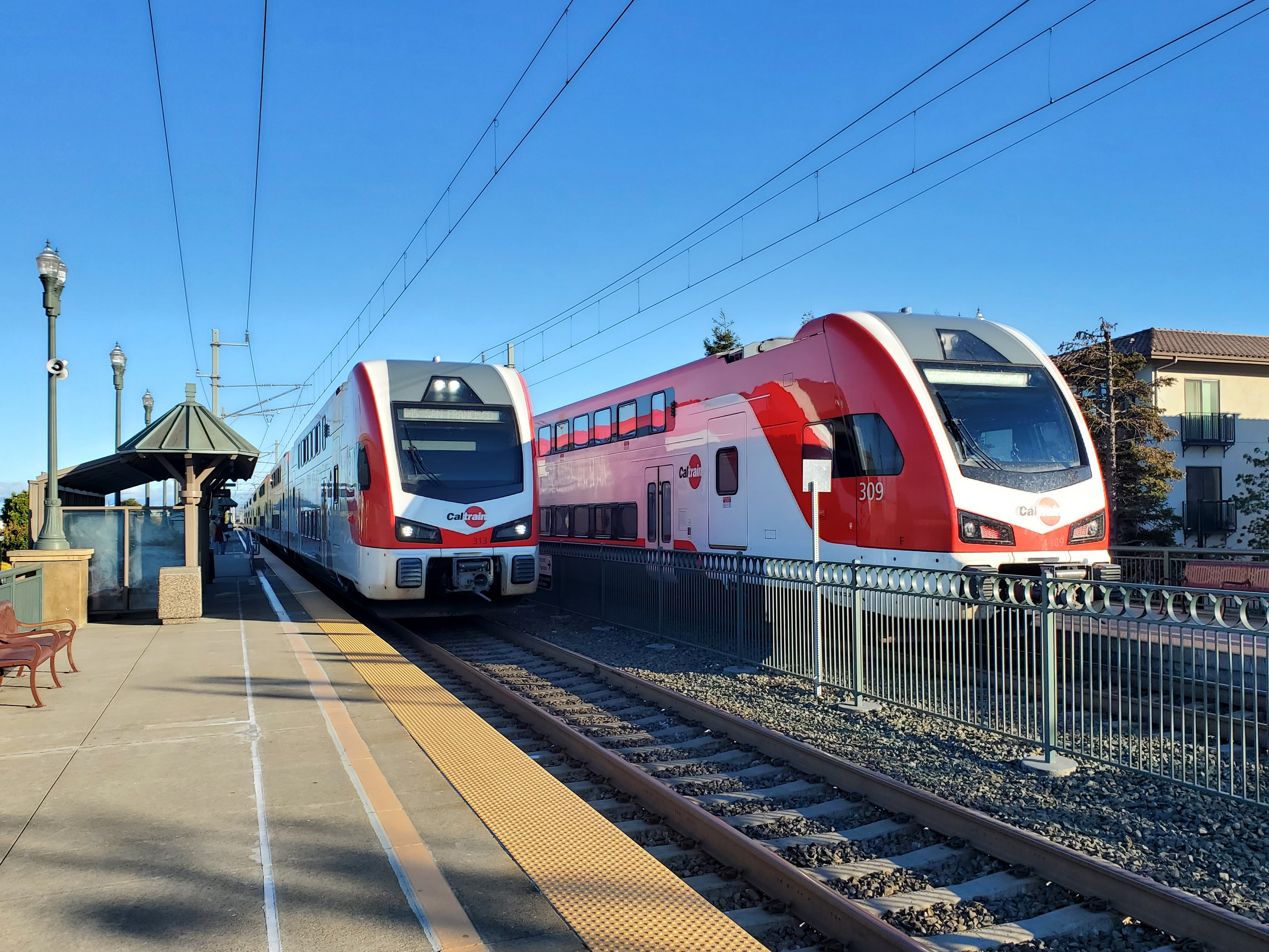
- Trains at San Carlos station in 2025

General information
- Location: 599 El Camino Real; San Carlos, California
- Coordinates: 37°30′29″N 122°15′37″W
- Owner: Peninsula Corridor Joint Powers Board (PCJPB)
- Line: PCJPB Peninsula Subdivision
- Platforms: 2 side platform
- Tracks: 2
- Connections: SamTrans: ECR, KX, 260, 261, 295, 397; San Mateo County Transit District Shuttles: Electronic Arts, Oracle

Construction
- Structure type: Elevated
- Parking: Available
- Cycle facilities: 24 racks, lockers
- Accessible: Yes

Other information
- Fare zone: 2

History
- Opened: 1888
- Rebuilt: 1997
- Original company: Southern Pacific

Passengers
- FY 2025: 644 (weekday avg.) ▲37%

Services
Preceding station	Caltrain	Following station
Belmont toward San Francisco	Local	Redwood City toward San Jose Diridon or Tamien
Belmont toward San Francisco	Weekend Local	Redwood City toward San Jose Diridon or Tamien
Limited does not stop here
Express does not stop here
Former services
Preceding station	Caltrain	Following station
Belmont toward San Francisco	Local (L1)	Redwood City toward San Jose Diridon or Tamien
Belmont toward San Francisco	Weekend Local (L2)	Redwood City toward San Jose Diridon or Tamien
San Mateo toward San Francisco	Limited (L4)	Redwood City toward San Jose Diridon, Tamien or Gilroy
Preceding station	Southern Pacific Railroad	Following station
Burlingame toward San Francisco	Coast Line	Atherton toward Los Angeles
Burlingame toward San Francisco	Del Monte Until 1971	Atherton toward Monterey
- Southern Pacific Depot
- U.S. National Register of Historic Places
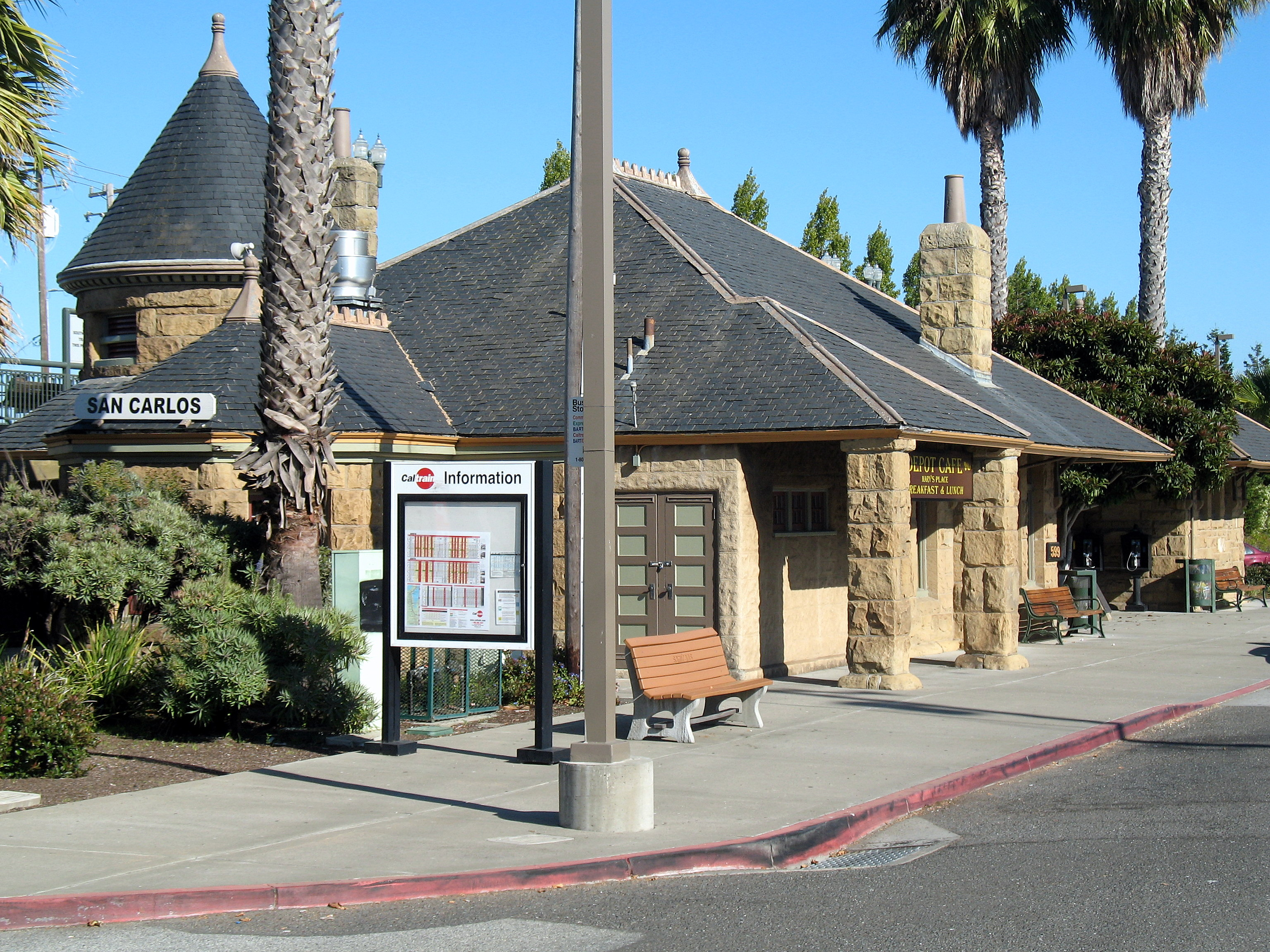
- San Carlos station building in 2011
- Area: 2.753 acres (1.114 ha)
- Architectural style: Richardsonian Romanesque
- NRHP reference No.: 84001191
- Added to NRHP: September 20, 1984
Location

San Carlos station is a Caltrain commuter rail station in San Carlos, California. The 1888-built station building, no longer used for railroad purposes, is listed on the National Register of Historic Places.

== Design ==
The Richardsonian Romanesque style station building was constructed of Almaden sandstone.

The modern elevated station, opened in 1997, has two side platforms serving the two tracks of the Peninsula Subdivision.

== History ==
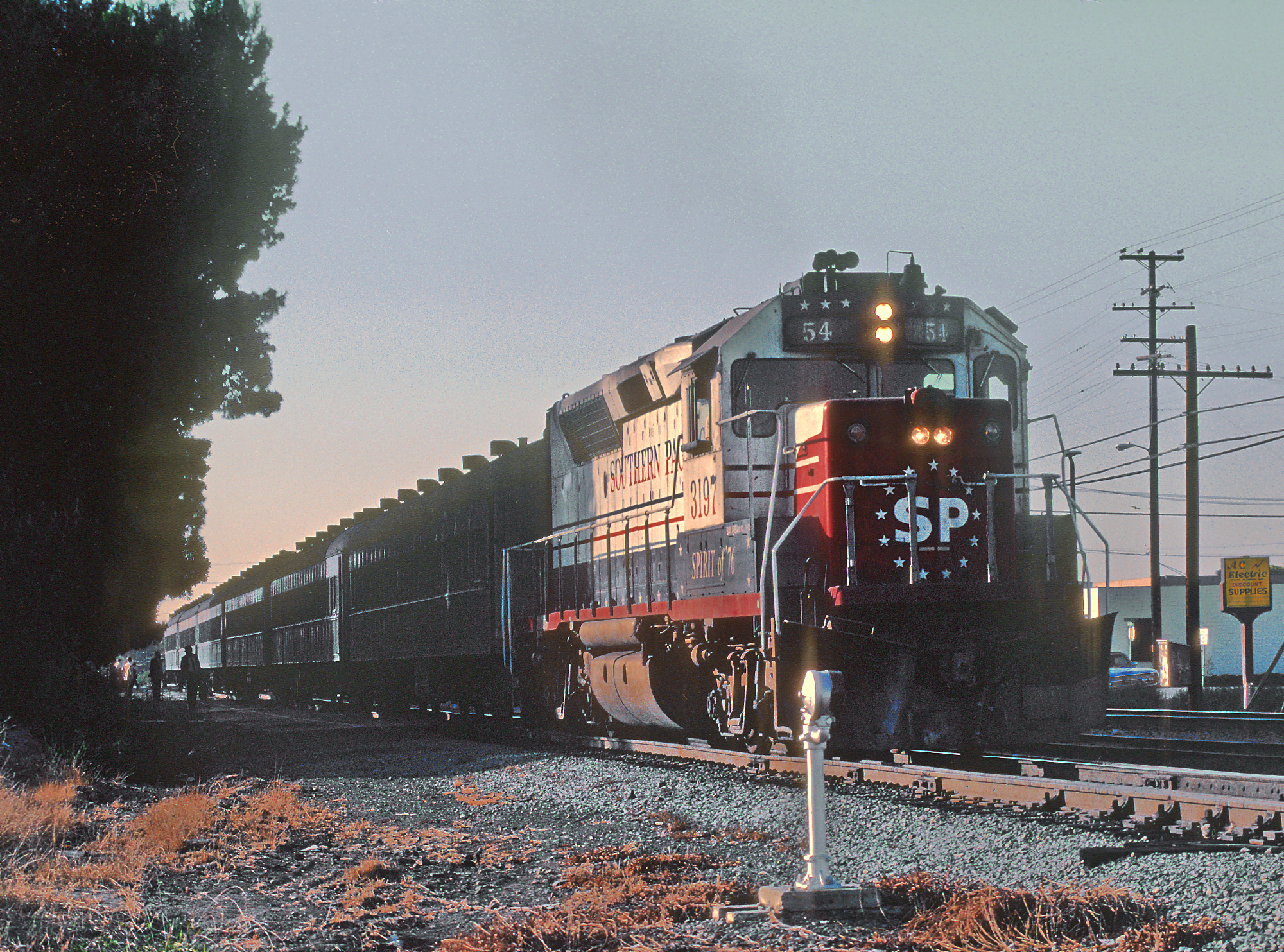
Peninsula Commute train at San Carlos in 1982

The station building was originally built by the Southern Pacific Railroad in 1888, and strongly resembles the Kenwood station, which the Southern Pacific opened the same year in Sonoma County. For its early history, the Depot was the only public building in San Carlos and functioned as the town's first community church, library, and post office. The structure was retired from railroad use in 1967, but Del Monte and Peninsula Commute trains continued to stop at the platforms.

The building was subsequently occupied by the San Carlos Chamber of Commerce and a real estate company. It was vacant when it was acquired by the California Department of Transportation. A restaurant opened in the depot in 1984. The Depot Cafe, which was decorated with photographs of historic trains, closed in February 2018, leaving the building vacant.

The depot was listed on the National Register of Historic Places on September 20, 1984, as Southern Pacific Depot. The San Carlos Lions Club donated a historical marker to mark its centennial in 1988.
