= Belmont station (Caltrain) =

Train station in Belmont, California, U.S.

Belmont
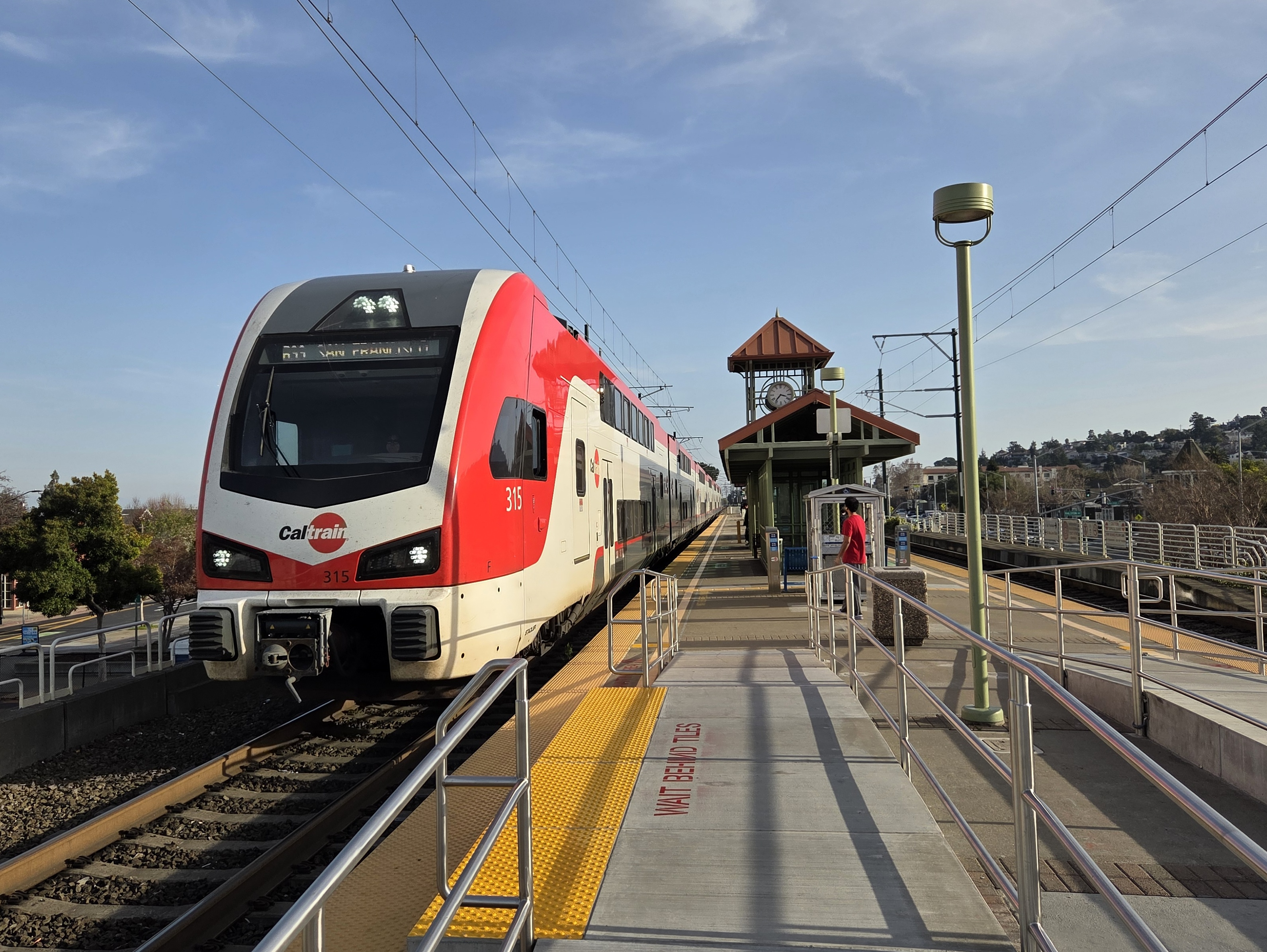
- A northbound train at Belmont station in 2026

General information
- Location: 995 El Camino Real; Belmont, California
- Coordinates: 37°31′17″N 122°16′35″W
- Owner: Peninsula Corridor Joint Powers Board (PCJPB)
- Line: PCJPB Peninsula Subdivision
- Platforms: 1 island platform
- Tracks: 2
- Connections: Samtrans: ECR, KX, 260, 261, 397

Construction
- Structure type: Elevated
- Parking: 375 spaces; paid
- Cycle facilities: 18 racks, lockers
- Accessible: Yes

Other information
- Fare zone: 2

History
- Opened: October 18, 1863
- Rebuilt: 1997

Passengers
- FY 2025: 654 per weekday ▲44%

Services
Preceding station	Caltrain	Following station
Hillsdale toward San Francisco	Local	San Carlos toward San Jose Diridon or Tamien
Hillsdale toward San Francisco	Weekend Local	San Carlos toward San Jose Diridon or Tamien
Limited does not stop here
Express does not stop here
Former services
Preceding station	Caltrain	Following station
Hillsdale toward San Francisco	Local (L1)	San Carlos toward San Jose Diridon or Tamien
Hillsdale toward San Francisco	Weekend Local (L2)	San Carlos toward San Jose Diridon or Tamien
Hillsdale toward San Francisco	Limited (L3)	Redwood City toward San Jose Diridon, Tamien or Gilroy
Preceding station	Southern Pacific Railroad	Following station
Hillsdale toward San Francisco	Coast Line	San Carlos toward Los Angeles
Location

Belmont station is a Caltrain station in Belmont, California that replaced the Southern Pacific Railroad station nearby. It is served by local and limited service trains.

Belmont was an inaugural station along the foundational San Francisco and San Jose Railroad, which commenced service on October 18, 1863. The modern elevated station was constructed in 1997 as part of a grade separation project.
