= Southern Pacific GS-1 class =

Class of 4-8-4 steam locomotives

Type and origin
- Power type: Steam
- Builder: Baldwin Locomotive Works
- Serial number: T&NO: 61390–61391, 61408–61409; SP: 61410–61415, 61430–41433
- Build date: May–July 1930
- Total produced: 14
Specifications
- Configuration
  - Whyte: 4-8-4
  - UIC: 2′D2′ h2
- Gauge: 4 ft 8 1/2 in (1,435 mm) standard gauge
- Driver dia.: 73 1/2 in (1,867 mm)
- Wheelbase: 88.23 ft (26,893 mm)
- Axle load: 67,000 lb (30,000 kilograms; 30 metric tons)
- Adhesive weight: 262,000 lb (119,000 kg; 119 t)
- Loco weight: 442,300 lb (200,600 kg; 200.6 t)
- Total weight: 733,300 lb (332,600 kg; 332.6 t)
- Fuel type: Fuel oil
- Fuel capacity: 4,690 US gal (17,800 L; 3,910 imp gal)
- Water cap.: 16,150 US gal (61,100 L; 13,450 imp gal)
- Firebox
  - Grate area: 90.2 sq ft (8.38 m^{2})
- Boiler pressure: 250 psi (1.72 MPa), formerly 210 psi (1.45 MPa)
- Feedwater heater: Worthington Type S, No. 5
- Heating surface
  - Firebox: 356 sq ft (33.1 m^{2})
  - Total surface: 4,858 sq ft (451.3 m^{2})
- Superheater
  - Heating area: 2,565 sq ft (238.3 m^{2})
- Cylinders: Two, outside
- Cylinder size: 27 in × 30 in (686 mm × 762 mm)
- Valve gear: Walschaerts
- Valve type: Piston
Performance figures
- Tractive effort: 62,200 lbf (276.68 kN), 75,910 lbf (337.66 kN) with booster
- Factor of adh.: 4.14
Career
- Operators: Southern Pacific; Texas and New Orleans
- Class: GS-1
- Numbers: SP: 4400–4409, 4470–4473; T&NO: 700–703, 704–710
- Retired: SP: 1959; T&NO: 1953
- Disposition: All scrapped

The Southern Pacific GS-1 was a class of conventional 4-8-4 "Northern" type steam locomotive operated by the Southern Pacific Railroad (SP) and its Texas subsidiary the Texas and New Orleans Railroad (T&NO) from 1930 to 1956. A total of fourteen were built by the Baldwin Locomotive Works, numbered 4400 through 4409 by SP and 700 through 703 by T&NO.

== History ==
=== Design and abilities ===
During the Great Depression in the 1930s, the Southern Pacific Railroad (SP) needed more power for their heavy passenger train service. They ordered a batch of fourteen 4-8-4 GS-1 locomotives from the Baldwin Locomotives Works between May and July 1930. The prefix GS indicates Golden State. Originally, the GS-1s' operating boiler pressure was 210 psi (1.45 MPa), but would eventually increase to 250 psi (1.72 MPa). The GS-1s were the first SP steam locomotives to have the cylinders connected to the frame in one piece. These locomotives operated on saturated steam for the injector, steam heat, hydrostatic lubricator, power reverser; and superheated steam for the oil-burning equipment, feedwater heater pumps, air pumps, booster, and whistle. They were designed to traverse through curves as sharp as 18 degrees.

=== Revenue service ===
The first four locomotives, Nos. 700-703, were assigned to the Texas and New Orleans (T&NO) subsidiary, while the last ten, Nos. 4400-4409, were built for SP's main fleet. The GS-1s were assigned to various passenger trains throughout the SP system, and ended their careers on the San Jose-San Francisco Peninsula Commute service.

No GS-1 locomotives survive.

== Fleet details ==
GS-1 Locomotive Details
Road number	Built date	Serial number	First run date	Scrapped date	Notes
700	May 1930	61390	August 12, 1930	May 31, 1956	Originally No. 700 from T&NO in December 1952 as SP's second No. 4403 replacement in March 1953. Renumbered again as SP's second No. 4470 in July of that year.
701	May 1930	61391	August 13, 1930	January 20, 1956	Originally No. 701 from T&NO in January 1953, became SP's second No. 4471 in July of that year.
702	June 1930	61408	August 8, 1930	July 9, 1956	Originally No. 702 from T&NO in January 1953, became SP's second No. 4404 in April of that year. Renumbered again as No. 4472 three months later.
703	June 1930	61409	August 7, 1930	February 15, 1955	Originally No. 703 from T&NO in January 1953, then became SP's No. 4406 replacement in April of that year. Renumbered again as No. 4473 three months later.
4400	June 1930	61410	August 23, 1930	March 23, 1954	Loaned to T&NO as No. 708 from 1943 to 1952. Returned to the SP as No. 4470 in March 1953 and renumbered again as No. 4400 in July of that year.
4401	June 1930	61411	August 25, 1930	June 8, 1955	Used for evaluation of various burner arrangements and different usage grades of oil in Sacramento, California in September 1946 until late 1951.
4402	June 1930	61412	August 26, 1930	April 24, 1959	Rebuilt in February 1932, after being involved in a boiler explosion at Richvale, California on December 25, 1931.
4403	June 1930	61413	August 27, 1930	August 15, 1955	Loaned to T&NO as No. 709 in 1943. Returned to the SP as No. 4471 in 1952 and renumbered again in July 1953 as No. 4403.
4404	June 1930	61414	August 27, 1930	?	Sold to T&NO as No. 710 in 1943.
4405	June 1930	61415	August 28, 1930	May 27, 1957	Retired from roster in February 1957.
4406	July 1930	61430	September 18, 1930	?	Sold to T&NO as No. 704 in March 1941.
4407	July 1930	61431	September 22, 1930	June 1, 1955	Loaned to T&NO as No. 705 from 1941 to 1952. Returned to the SP on April 20, 1953.
4408	July 1930	61432	September 24, 1930	August 15, 1955	Loaned to T&NO as No. 706 from 1941 to 1953. Returned to the SP on April 20, 1953. Used as an official portrait of this locomotive class.
4409	July 1930	61433	October 9, 1930	September 6, 1955	Loaned to T&NO as No. 707 from 1941 to 1952. Returned to the SP on June 11, 1953.

== Bibliography ==
- Diebert, Timothy S.; Strapac, Joseph A. (1987). Southern Pacific Company Steam Locomotive Conpendium (1st ed.). Shade Tree Books. ISBN 0-930742-12-5.
- Duke, Donald (1962). Southern Pacific Steam Locomotives: A Pictorial Anthology of Western Railroading (1st ed.). Golden West Books.
- Johnson, Kenneth G. (2006). Southern Pacific Daylight Steam Locomotives (1st ed.). Specialty Press. ISBN 978-1-58007-194-9.
- Solomon, Brian (2007). Southern Pacific Railroad (1st ed.). Voyageur Press. ISBN 978-0-7603-2931-3.
