= Menlo Park station =

Train station in Menlo Park, California, U.S.

Menlo Park
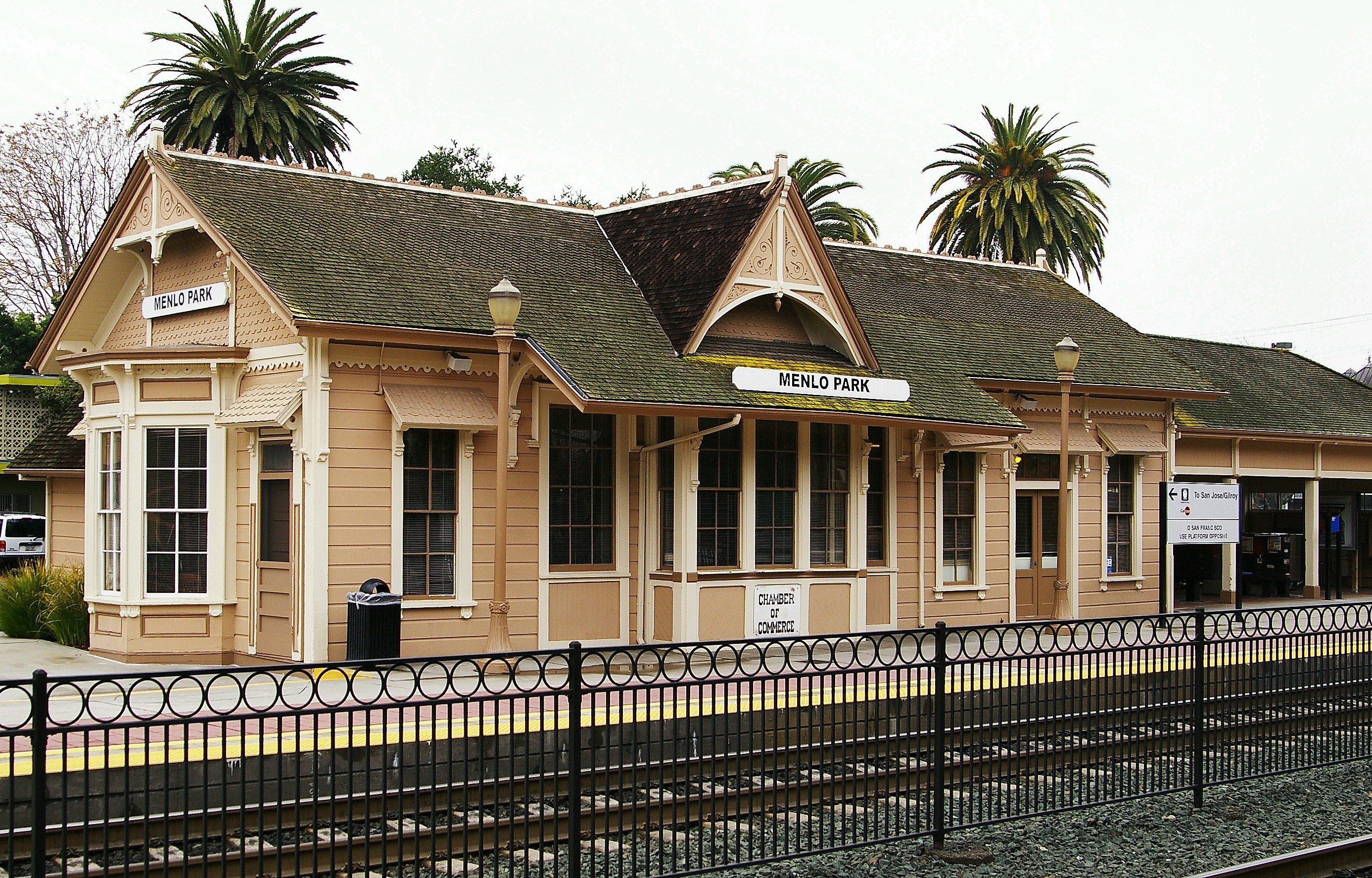
- Menlo Park station building in January 2010

General information
- Location: 1120 Merrill Street; Menlo Park, California
- Coordinates: 37.454607°N 122.182526°W
- Owner: Peninsula Corridor Joint Powers Board (PCJPB)
- Line: PCJPB Peninsula Subdivision
- Platforms: 2 side platforms
- Tracks: 2
- Connections: Marsh Road Shuttle; Menlo Park Midday Shuttle; SamTrans: ECR, 82, 83, 84, 86, 286, 296; Willow Road Shuttle

Construction
- Parking: 150 spaces; paid
- Cycle facilities: 8 racks, 50 space parking station
- Accessible: Yes

Other information
- Fare zone: 3

History
- Opened: 1863

Passengers
- FY 2025: 863 (weekday avg.) ▲34%

Services
| Preceding station | Caltrain | Following station |
|---|---|---|
| Redwood City toward San Francisco | Local | Palo Alto toward San Jose Diridon or Tamien |
| Redwood City toward San Francisco | Limited | Palo Alto toward San Jose Diridon |
| Redwood City toward San Francisco | Weekend Local | Palo Alto toward San Jose Diridon or Tamien |
Express does not stop here
Former services
| Preceding station | Caltrain | Following station |
|---|---|---|
| Redwood City toward San Francisco | Local (L1) | Palo Alto toward San Jose Diridon or Tamien |
| Atherton toward San Francisco | Weekend Local (L2) | Palo Alto toward San Jose Diridon or Tamien |
| Redwood City toward San Francisco | Limited (L3) | Palo Alto toward San Jose Diridon, Tamien or Gilroy |
| Redwood City toward San Francisco | Limited (L5) | Palo Alto toward San Jose Diridon or Tamien |
| Preceding station | Southern Pacific Railroad | Following station |
| Atherton toward San Francisco | Coast Line | Palo Alto toward Los Angeles |
- Menlo Park Railroad Station
- U.S. National Register of Historic Places
- California Historical Landmark
- Area: less than one acre
- Architectural style: Late 19th And Early 20th Century American Movements, Stick-Style
- NRHP reference No.: 74000556
- CHISL No.: 955

Significant dates
- Added to NRHP: October 1, 1974
- Designated CHISL: February 28, 1983
Location

Menlo Park station is a Caltrain station located in Menlo Park, California. It was an inaugural station along the foundational San Francisco and San Jose Railroad, which commenced service on October 18, 1863, making it the oldest continually operating railway station in California. The station building was built in 1867 and later acquired by the Southern Pacific Railroad. During the 1890s, Southern Pacific added Victorian ornamentation to the depot to make it appear more attractive to students and visitors to Stanford University. The station was added to the National Register of Historic Places in 1974, and became a California Historical Landmark in 1983.

Until 2020, the station building was leased by the Menlo Park Chamber of Commerce. In 2026, it was announced that Caltrain would renovate it for office use.
