= Lomita Park, California =

Unincorporated community in California, United States

- Unincorporated community
- Location within the state of California Lomita Park, California (the United States)
- Coordinates: 37°37′0″N 122°24′12″W
- Country: United States
- State: California
- County: San Mateo
- Elevation: 25 ft (7.6 m)
- Time zone: UTC-8 (Pacific (PST))
  - Summer (DST): UTC-7 (PDT)

Lomita Park, California is a small unincorporated community adjacent to San Bruno in San Mateo County, just west of the San Francisco International Airport. It is roughly bounded by San Felipe Avenue, El Camino Real, San Juan Avenue, and the Southern Pacific railroad tracks.

The Southern Pacific Railroad acquired the original San Francisco and San Jose Railroad, which was built in the 1860s. Southern Pacific operated both passenger and freight trains along the route. An interurban railroad ran parallel to the Southern Pacific, from San Francisco to San Mateo. Lomita Park's school children used the interurban trains to go to high school, first at San Mateo High School (from 1902 to 1923) and then at Burlingame High School (from 1923 to 1950). The completion of Capuchino High School in September 1950 enabled Lomita Park children to walk to school.

In 1912, El Camino Real was paved through San Bruno and Lomita Park. This was the first paved state highway in California. Originally a two-lane highway, El Camino Real was widened to four lanes in the late 1920s. It was part of the original routing of U.S. Route 101; in the early 1960s, it was designated State Route 82. El Camino Real is now mostly a six-lane highway, running from South San Francisco to San Jose.

In 1927, a post office was established in the community with the name "Belmae Park," combining the names of Belle Mae Miggis, the first post office lady. The name was changed to Lomita Park in 1933. The post office closed in 1957, but postal offices have continued in San Bruno and Millbrae.

In 1953, San Bruno annexed the community. Lomita Park had its own Southern Pacific train station and some community services. This community is still currently identified as the "Lomita Park district" of San Bruno.

The Lomita Park Elementary School is just south of the San Bruno city limits and is part of the Millbrae School District.

Lomita Park has an elevation of 25 feet. Its location is: Latitude: 373700N, Longitude: 1222412W; Decimal Degrees: Latitude: 37.61667, Longitude: -122.40333.
