= Redwood City station =

Train station in Redwood City, California, U.S.

Redwood City
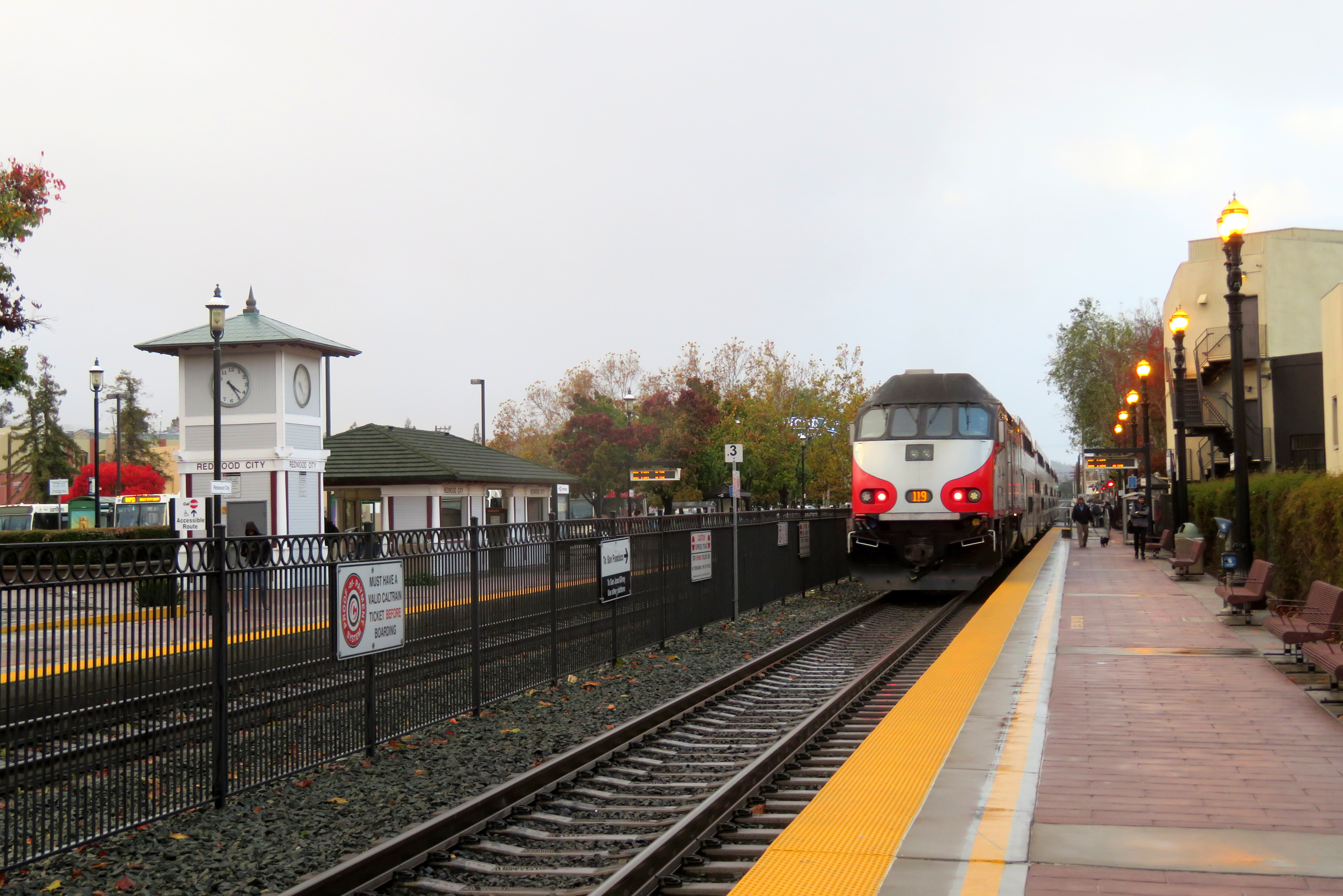
- A northbound train leaving Redwood City station in 2018

General information
- Location: 1 James Avenue; Redwood City, California
- Coordinates: 37°29′09″N 122°13′53″W
- Owner: Peninsula Corridor Joint Powers Board (PCJPB)
- Line: PCJPB Peninsula Subdivision
- Platforms: 2 side platforms
- Tracks: 2
- Connections: SamTrans: ECR, 270, 274, 275, 276, 278, 296, 397; Commute.org: Redwood City-Midpoint, Seaport Centre; Pacific Shores Shuttle

Construction
- Parking: 557 spaces; paid
- Cycle facilities: 18 racks, 50 lockers
- Accessible: Yes

Other information
- Fare zone: 2

History
- Opened: October 18, 1863
- Rebuilt: 1901, July 1995
- Original company: Southern Pacific

Passengers
- FY 2025: 2,111 (weekday avg.) ▲30%

Services
Preceding station	Caltrain	Following station
San Carlos toward San Francisco	Local	Menlo Park toward San Jose Diridon or Tamien
Hillsdale toward San Francisco	Limited	Menlo Park toward San Jose Diridon
Hillsdale toward San Francisco	Express	Palo Alto toward San Jose Diridon
San Carlos toward San Francisco	Weekend Local	Menlo Park toward San Jose Diridon or Tamien
Former services
Preceding station	Caltrain	Following station
San Carlos toward San Francisco	Local (L1)	Menlo Park toward San Jose Diridon or Tamien
San Carlos toward San Francisco	Weekend Local (L2)	Atherton toward San Jose Diridon or Tamien
Belmont toward San Francisco	Limited (L3)	Menlo Park toward San Jose Diridon, Tamien or Gilroy
San Carlos toward San Francisco	Limited (L4)	Palo Alto toward San Jose Diridon, Tamien or Gilroy
Hillsdale toward San Francisco	Limited (L5)	Menlo Park toward San Jose Diridon or Tamien
Hillsdale toward San Francisco	Baby Bullet (B7)	Palo Alto toward San Jose Diridon
Preceding station	Southern Pacific Railroad	Following station
San Carlos toward San Francisco	Coast Line	Atherton toward Los Angeles
Terminus	Dumbarton Cut-off	Newark toward Fremont
Location

Redwood City station is a Caltrain commuter rail station located in Redwood City, California. It is served by all trains. The station has two side platforms serving the two tracks of the Peninsula Subdivision.

Redwood City was an inaugural station along the foundational San Francisco and San Jose Railroad, which commenced service on October 18, 1863.

A new station building located several hundred feet to the south was built in 1901. It was remodeled in 1937 and moved to the west side of the tracks. The structure burned down in 1979 and was replaced with a "temporary" station in a trailer. A new waiting shelter was built in 1995, designed to emulate the original though with the addition of a clock tower.
