= Monterey County Rail Extension =

Planned rail extension

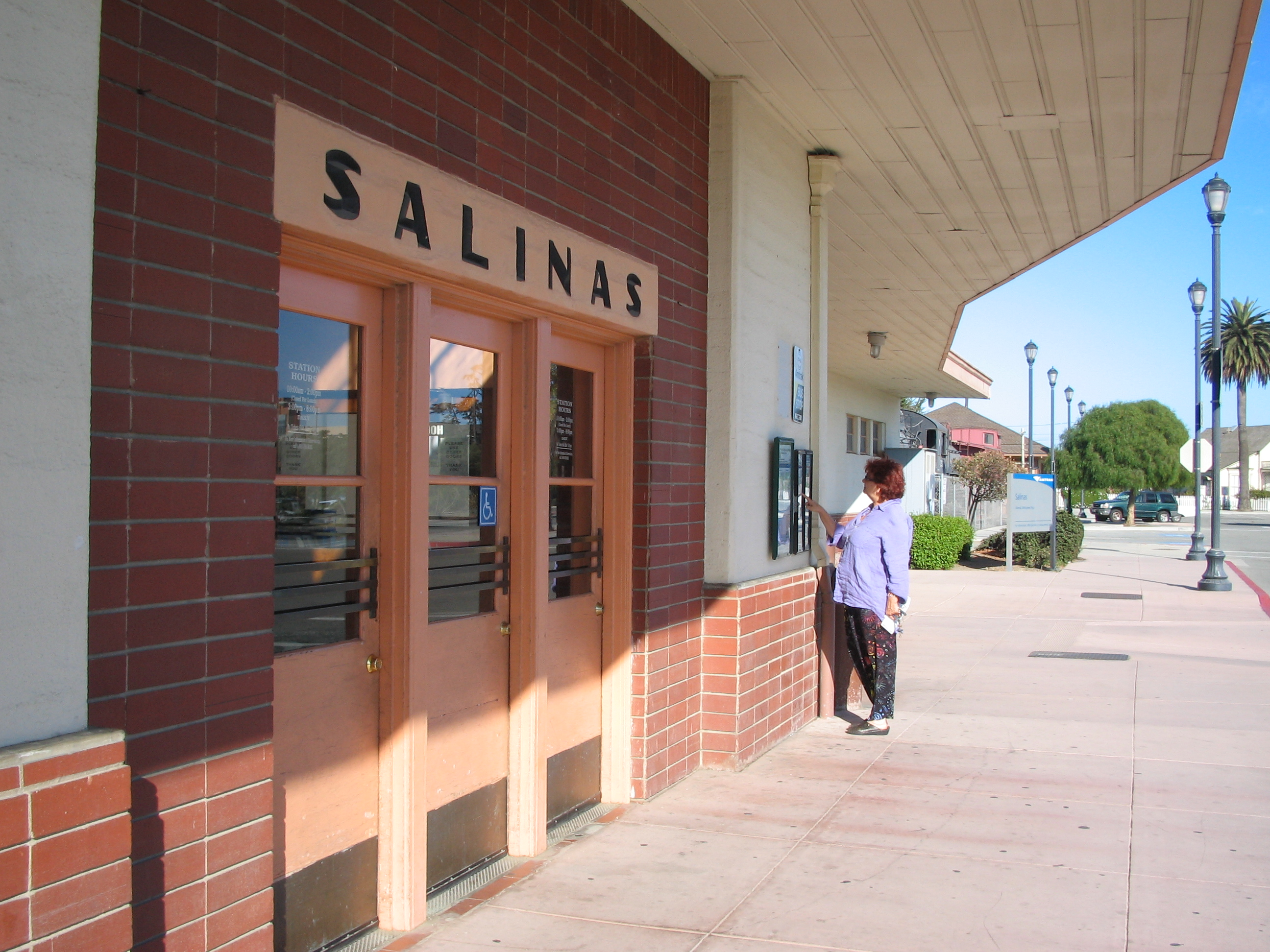
- Salinas Intermodal Transportation Center will be the morning starting point for planned weekday train service to San Francisco via the Monterey County Rail Extension.

Overview
- Service type: Inter-city rail
- Status: Planned
- Locale: Northern California, United States
- Current operator: Caltrain
- Website: Monterey County Rail Extension

Route
- Termini: Salinas; San Francisco (4th and King)
- Distance travelled: 122 mi (196 km)
- Service frequency: 2× Salinas→San Jose→San Francisco (AM); 2× San Francisco→San Jose→Salinas (PM); 2x Salinas→Sacramento/Auburn; 2x Auburn/Sacramento→Salinas

The Monterey County Rail Extension is a planned commuter rail extension that would bring Caltrain passenger service south of its existing Gilroy, California terminus to Salinas in Monterey County, using the existing Coast Line owned by Union Pacific (UPRR). Implementation of the rail extension will occur over three phases, starting from Salinas and moving north. When construction is complete, there will be four trains operated over the extended line per weekday: two northbound trains that depart from Salinas and travel to San Francisco in the morning, and two southbound trains that return to Salinas in the afternoon.

After years of delays, the Transportation Agency for Monterey County [TAMC] is predicting service to commence in 2028.

== History ==
=== Southern Pacific ===
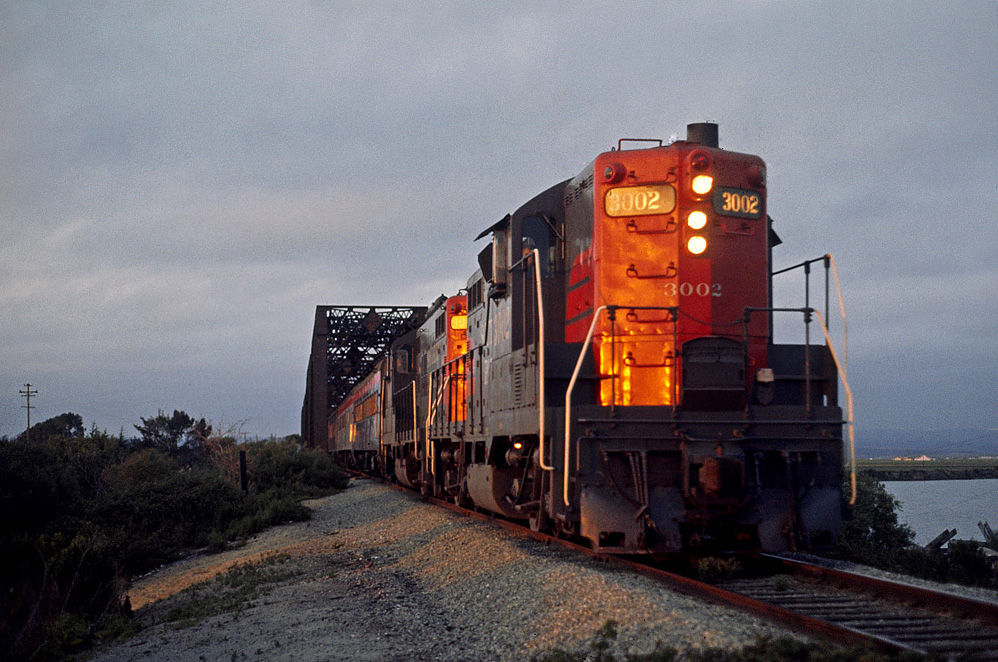
Next-to-last Del Monte after crossing the Salinas River Trestle (April 1971)

The Southern Pacific Railroad (SP) operated intercity passenger train services in California, including the Del Monte between San Francisco and Monterey, until the inception of Amtrak in 1971. Amtrak declined to continue operation of the Del Monte and the service was discontinued.

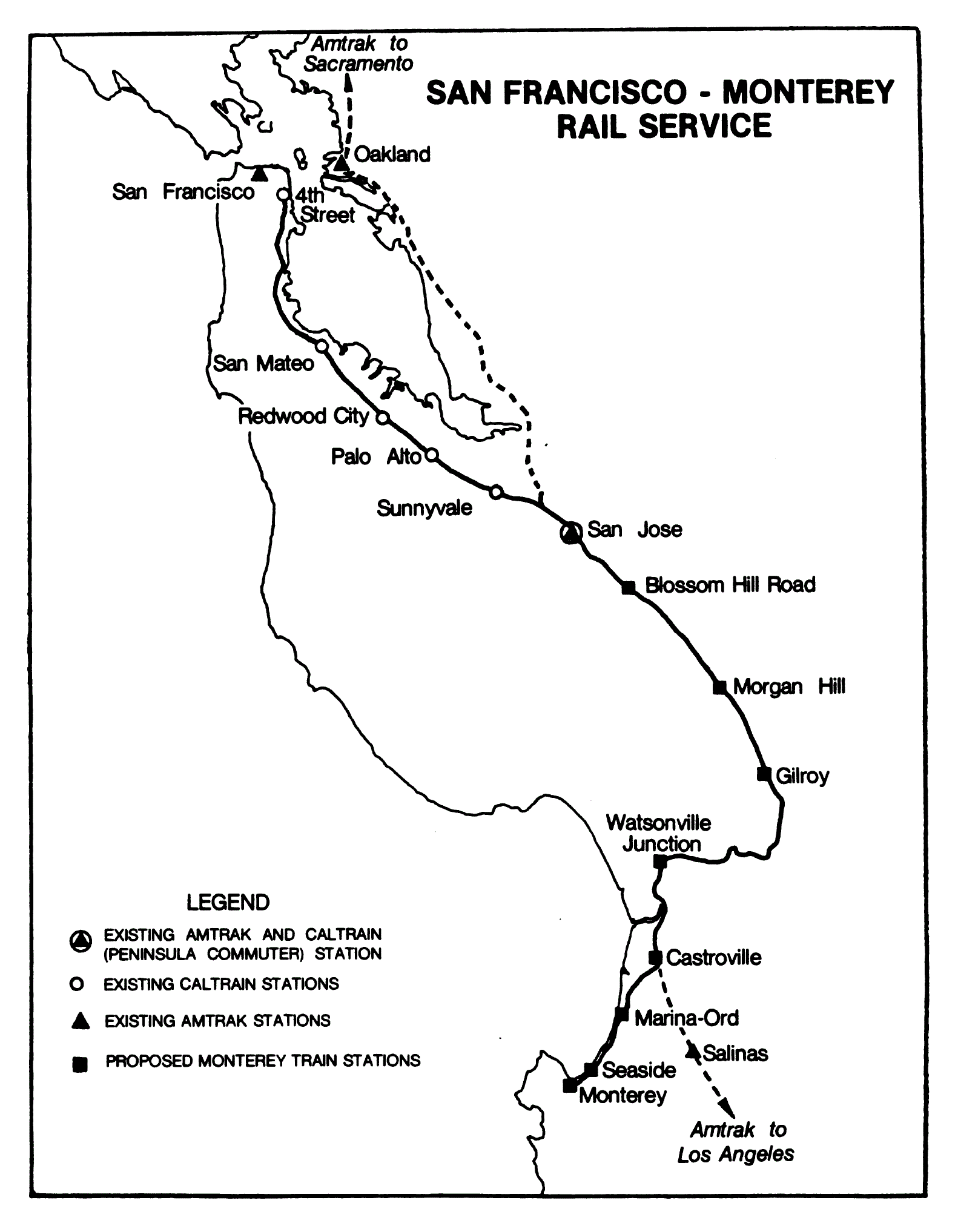
Map III from the Rail Passenger Development Plan (1984), showing stations and route for planned passenger service between San Francisco and Monterey

Potential restoration of passenger service to Monterey had been identified as early as 1980. A study published in 1981 was described in the Caltrans 1984–89 Rail Passenger Development Plan, which stated restoration of passenger service to Monterey could be feasible if certain conditions could be met, including track improvements along the Monterey Branch Line and construction of stations south of San Jose. The annual operating cost would be $2.5 million, serving an estimated 190,000 to 234,000 passengers per year, assuming a schedule similar to the former Del Monte. Because Amtrak did not provide direct service to San Francisco, it continued to rebuff requests to restart the service in the 1980s. Operation of a San Francisco–Monterey route under SP continued to be studied; with an annual ridership forecast of 210,000, gross revenue would be $1.1 million, yielding a higher first-year farebox recovery ratio than any previous public rail transit project in California. However, because of the large capital investment required (SP estimated $3.4–4.4 million alone would be required to rehabilitate the track), the state did not continue to purse restarting the service.

=== Caltrain ===
SP retained operation of the Peninsula Commute intercity commuter rail service after 1971, serving cities along the San Francisco Peninsula and Santa Clara Valley between San Francisco (4th and King station) and San Jose (Diridon) until it was first sponsored and then taken over by Caltrans between 1980 and 1985. In 1985, the state took over the service, which was renamed to Caltrain and SP was retained as the contract operator. The tri-county (San Francsico, San Mateo, and Santa Clara) Peninsula Corridor Joint Powers Board (PCJPB) was formed to take over the regional rail service from the state and purchased the right-of-way between San Francisco and Tamien from SP in 1991. Subsequently, PCJPB extended Caltrain extended commuter service south of San Jose to Gilroy in July 1992. Because the PCJPB owned right-of-way ends at Control Point Lick, just south of Tamien station, extended service south of there is provided under an agreement with the UPRR to use that railroad's Coast Line for a limited number of daily passenger trains. These are operated in the traditional commute direction: northbound in the morning from Gilroy to San Francisco, returning south in the afternoon. Caltrain built a layover yard in Gilroy between 6th and 10th streets, next to Gilroy Transit Center, where trains are stored overnight; tracks terminate just north of 10th and do not connect with the rest of the Coast Line.

Since the inauguration of Gilroy service, the concept of a passenger rail extension to Monterey County has been considered, starting with the Caltrans-sponsored Passenger Rail Feasibility Study No. 05D423 (1992), which examined the possibility of passenger rail service between San Francisco, Monterey, Salinas, and Hollister, concluding that Salinas was a feasible origin for the commuter rail service. In 1994, the Monterey County Regional Transportation Plan selected a Caltrain extension as the locally preferred alternative. The cities of Salinas and Watsonville also considered rail station improvements and construction starting in 1996, including a Draft Pajaro Valley Station Project Study Report (1997) and Pajaro Railyards Area Feasibility Study (2000), culminating in a study sponsored by the Transportation Agency for Monterey County (TAMC), Extension of Caltrain Commuter Service to Monterey County Business Plan (2000).

Under the Business Plan, a one-way fare from Salinas was estimated to cost approximately $3.50 and increased ridership would bring in an extra $1.4 million in annual revenue. The total cost of the project was estimated to be $25.7 M, most of which would be spent for improvement/construction of the three stations ($19.5 M) and the new layover facility in Salinas ($3.8 M).

Subsequently, Caltrain was approached by TAMC to extend service further south along the Coast Line from Gilroy into Monterey County. A draft of the Caltrain Extension to Monterey County Alternatives Analysis was first published in 2006 and updated in 2007; four alternatives were analyzed, with most assuming inter-county commuter rail service provided by Caltrain, extended from Gilroy to either Castroville or Salinas, connecting to Monterey via Marina on a new intra-county service provided by either bus rapid transit, light rail transit, or local buses:

2006/07 Alternatives Analysis
Alt.	Main line (intercounty) service		Monterey Branch Line (intracounty) service		Cost ($M)
Alt.	Type	Service (potential vehicles)	Type	Service (potential vehicles)	Cost ($M)
A	Commuter rail	Caltrain Extension to Salinas, transfer to local service at Castroville or Salinas (Caltrain, Superliner, or Colorado Railcar DMU)	BRT	Phased implementation: Monterey to Marina; Marina to Castroville; Marina to Salinas on surface roads; (articulated or rigid buses, trolley cars)	193
B	Commuter rail	Caltrain Extension to Salinas, transfer to local service at Salinas (Caltrain, Superliner, or Colorado Railcar DMU)	Phase 1: BRT	Monterey to Marina; (articulated or rigid buses, trolley cars): Intercity rail service (Monterey to SF); (streetcar-like DMUs)	305
B	Commuter rail	Caltrain Extension to Salinas, transfer to local service at Salinas (Caltrain, Superliner, or Colorado Railcar DMU)	Phase 2: LRT	Monterey to Castroville; (streetcar-like DMUs): Intercity rail service (Monterey to SF); (streetcar-like DMUs)	305
C	Commuter rail	Caltrain Extension to Salinas, transfer to local service at Castroville (Caltrain, Superliner, or Colorado Railcar DMU)	LRT	Phased implementation: Monterey to Marina; Marina to Castroville; Castroville to Salinas; (streetcar-like DMUs)	230
D	Express Bus	Monterey County to Bay Area (Note: including Caltrain stations in San Francisco, San Mateo, and Santa Clara counties)	Local Bus	Monterey/Marina; Marina/Salinas	1.234

Also in 2006, with the Caltrain Express project completed, PCJPB began planning the electrification of the line, publishing results in the Project 2025 report (2006); the electrification project would compete with MCRX for Caltrain's time and attention.

A draft environmental impact report (DEIR) published in 2006 stated the lack of public transportation options between Monterey County and the San Francisco Bay Area has resulted in increased private commuter vehicle traffic. The 2006/07 Alternatives Analysis estimated that approximately 6,000 people commuted daily from Monterey County to the Bay Area. According to the DEIR, traffic on U.S. Route 101 was projected to rise by up to 56% in 2020 compared to 1998 levels, resulting in unstable traffic flow from the Salinas city limits to the Santa Clara County line as a result.

The proposed extension would create new stations and stops in Pajaro (serving Watsonville in adjacent Santa Cruz County at an estimated cost of US$6,585,000 (equivalent to $10,517,000 in 2025)) and Castroville (at an estimated cost of US$11,150,000 (equivalent to $17,807,000 in 2025)) before terminating at the existing Salinas Amtrak station that currently is served by Coast Starlight passenger service. Under these plans, the Salinas station would be rebuilt as an intermodal station to connect commuter rail with Monterey-Salinas Transit buses. A layover yard would be added to accommodate Caltrain crews and maintenance, and the total cost of the Salinas improvements was estimated at US$39,705,000 (equivalent to $63,411,000 in 2025). The 2006/07 Alternatives Analysis stated the Caltrain Extension would attract 1,028 riders in each direction in 2010, doubling ridership by 2030; this would be equivalent to expanding the freeway by 1/4 to 1/2 lane over the 74.2 mi (119.4 km) extension, and "when compared to the cost of constructing equivalent freeway capacity", the project would "pay for itself in one year".

The cost of operating commuter rail from the anticipated start of service until 2030 was estimated at US$64,900,000 (equivalent to $103,649,000 in 2025) for two daily round trips, including an expansion to four round trips daily within ten years. Extensions to Hollister have been proposed since at least 2003. This project depends on state and federal funding availability, a possible local sales tax measure, and an agreement with UPRR, the owner of the Coast Line. This project is managed by TAMC, who released the Final Environment Impact Report (EIR) for this project in 2006.

=== Capitol Corridor ===
Existing and planned standard gauge commuter rail services in the San Francisco Bay Area, as of 2021.

In 2009, Caltrain requested that TAMC approach other train operators. TAMC subsequently opened discussions with the Capitol Corridor Joint Powers Authority (CCJPA) and the Caltrans Division of Rail to extend Capitol Corridor service south from San Jose to Salinas using the same Coast Line routing and stations. The switch to Capitol Corridor was cited as an advantage, since CCJPA had experience with commuter trains sharing service on UPRR-owned freight right-of-way. Two Capitol Corridor trains would originate from Salinas in the mornings and run through to San Jose and on to Sacramento, with two evening trains making the return trip south to Salinas.

By 2016, plans had shifted to favor an extension of Capitol Corridor to Salinas. In 2018, the awarding of Road Repair and Accountability Act funds, Caltrain was named as the operator of the first commuter rail service to Salinas, with an extension of the Capitol Corridor service to follow.

By March 2020, two daily Caltrain round trips were planned to begin in 2022 after the completion of the Salinas layover facility and trackwork at Gilroy. Future phases would add stations at Pajaro/Watsonville and Castroville, with the potential for up to six daily round trips. As of February 2024, construction necessary for the Salinas service is expected to begin in the summer of 2025.

== Route ==
Rail passenger traffic between Salinas and Tamien (via Gilroy) will run over the existing Union Pacific-owned Coast Subdivision. The three phases of the MCRX project are centered around the three stations that will be built or rebuilt for passenger service:

1. Salinas (intermodal upgrade of existing Amtrak station, MCRX terminus)
2. Pajaro/Watsonville (new intermodal infill station, connecting to routes in Santa Cruz County)
3. Castroville (new intermodal infill station, connecting to Pacific Grove via Marina and Monterey)

=== Phase 1 — Salinas ===
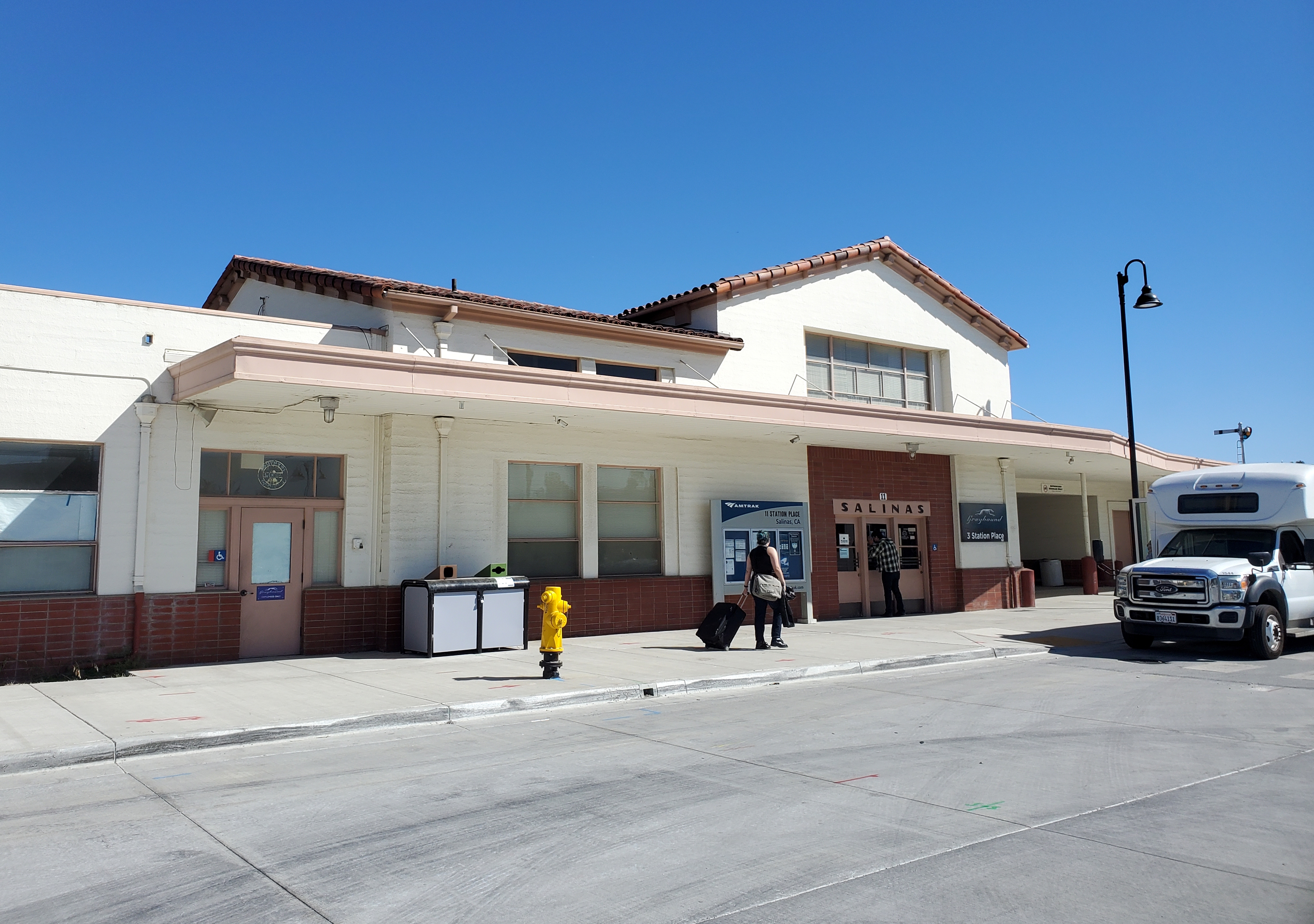
Salinas station building (Oct 2021), as rebuilt with intermodal bus connections

The first phase of the project will extend the southern terminus to the existing Salinas Intermodal Transportation Center and improve it. In addition, the layover yard will be moved from Gilroy to a new site in Salinas, and the Gilroy station will be upgraded to allow through-traffic by extending the PCJPB-owned tracks south across 10th Street in Gilroy to connect with the Coast Line.

Work on the Salinas Intermodal Transportation Center has been ongoing since June 1996. The city of Salinas finalized site plans in June 1998 and acquired the 3.5-acre (1.4 ha) station site in 1999 from the UPRR, then subsequently constructed the existing Amtrak facility. Construction on Salinas Intermodal Transportation Center was completed in January 2021 at an estimated cost of $11.2 million; it has been upgraded with an intermodal transfer area using five bus bays in the station parking lot, and Lincoln Avenue has been extended across West Market Street with a new signalized intersection to facilitate traffic flows.

The next part of the work involves construction of an overnight train layover facility at Salinas. The cost of the Salinas train layover facility is estimated to be $25 million. By 2022, the project was expected to start accepting bids for construction in 2024 and finish as early as 2025. This timeline had been pushed back by 2025, with the layover facility expected to be completed in 2028. Gilroy track modifications are scheduled for approximately the same time with an estimated cost of $16 million; the scope and schedule need approval from Union Pacific.

=== Phase 2 — Pajaro/Watsonville ===
The next phase of the project will add a new intermodal Pajaro/Watsonville infill station to serve both Pajaro and Watsonville, at the site of the former Southern Pacific Watsonville Junction station, connecting with Santa Cruz METRO bus routes for destinations in Santa Cruz County. In addition, there are several proposal to inaugurate commuter rail service over the Santa Cruz Branch, which runs west and north along the coast between Pajaro and Davenport via Santa Cruz.

Pajaro/Watsonville station would be close to the intersection of Lewis and Salinas roads, south of the eastern leg of the existing rail wye where the Coast Line and Santa Cruz Branch meet. The cost of the new intermodal station is estimated to be $69 million, including site preparation; for expanded service, an additional $30 M would be needed for modifications. The station plans are undergoing environmental review, and construction could start as early as 2026.

The 2000 Business Plan report suggested that on-track speeds could be improved in the future by widening the "Betabel" curve (Curve No. 109, near the Betabel Road interchange with U.S. Highway 101), south of Gilroy. Track speeds are restricted to 50 mph (80 km/h) in this area, and drop further as trains negotiate more sharp curves at Chittenden Pass / Pajaro Gap, near a rock quarry. The cost of these improvements, including a potential new rail tunnel, were estimated to be approximately $11 to $14 M, approximately half the estimated cost of the entire extension at the time, making it more likely to be implemented as a future improvement.

Santa Cruz Branch

Santa Cruz Branch

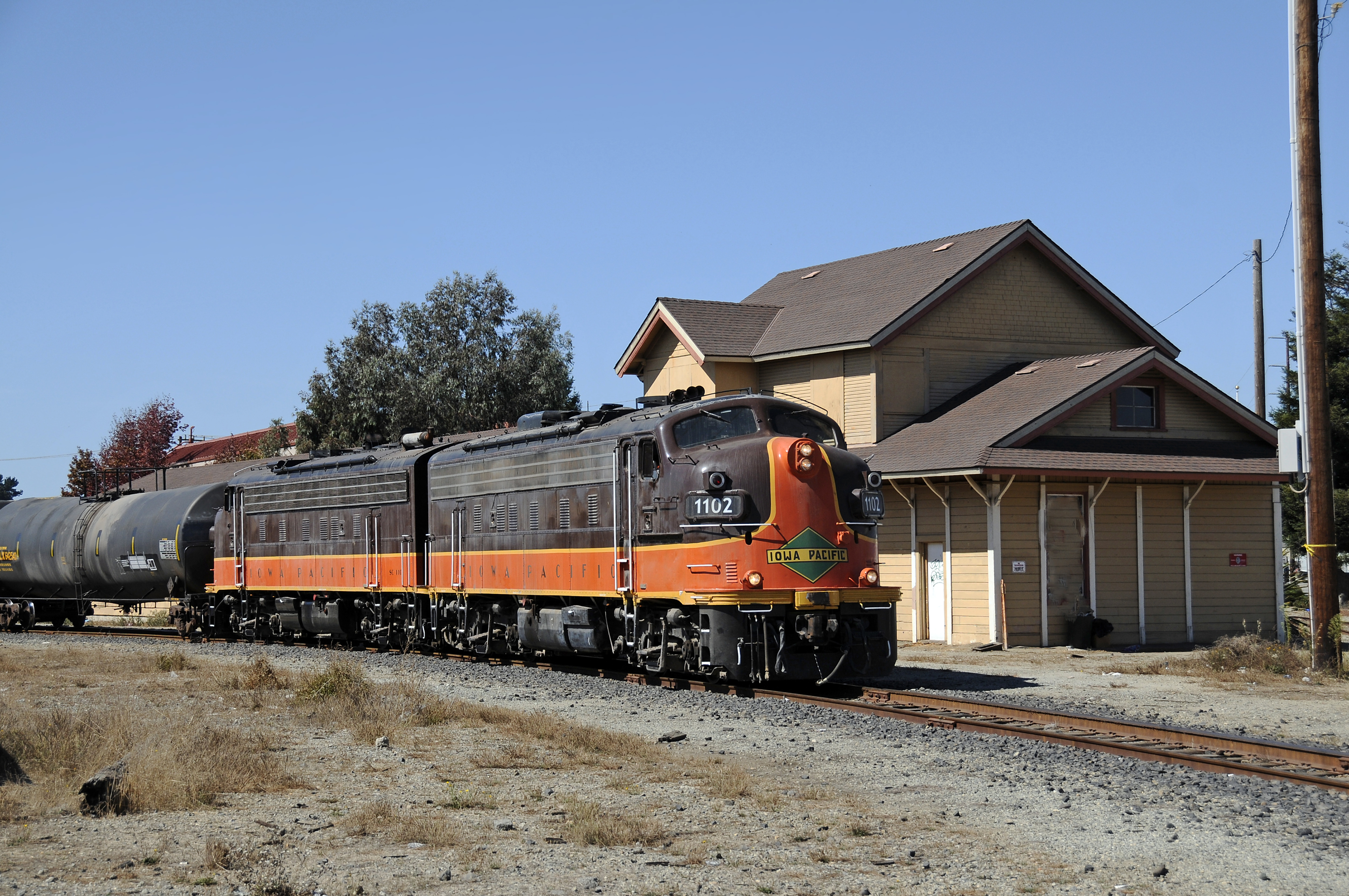
Iowa Pacific #1102 at downtown Watsonville (2014)

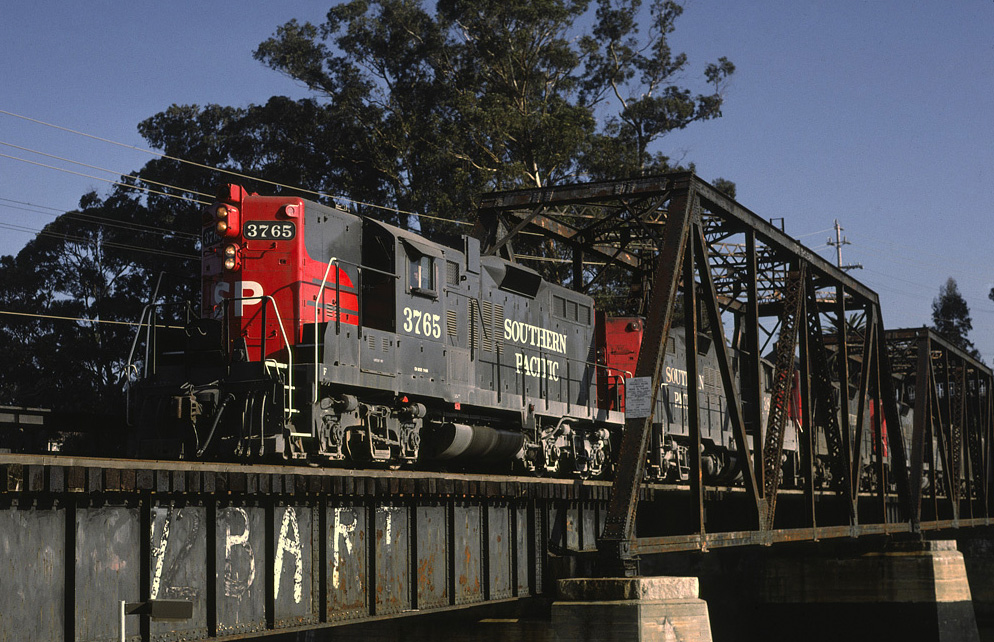
SP #3765 on the 1905 San Lorenzo River Bridge, a filming location for The Lost Boys

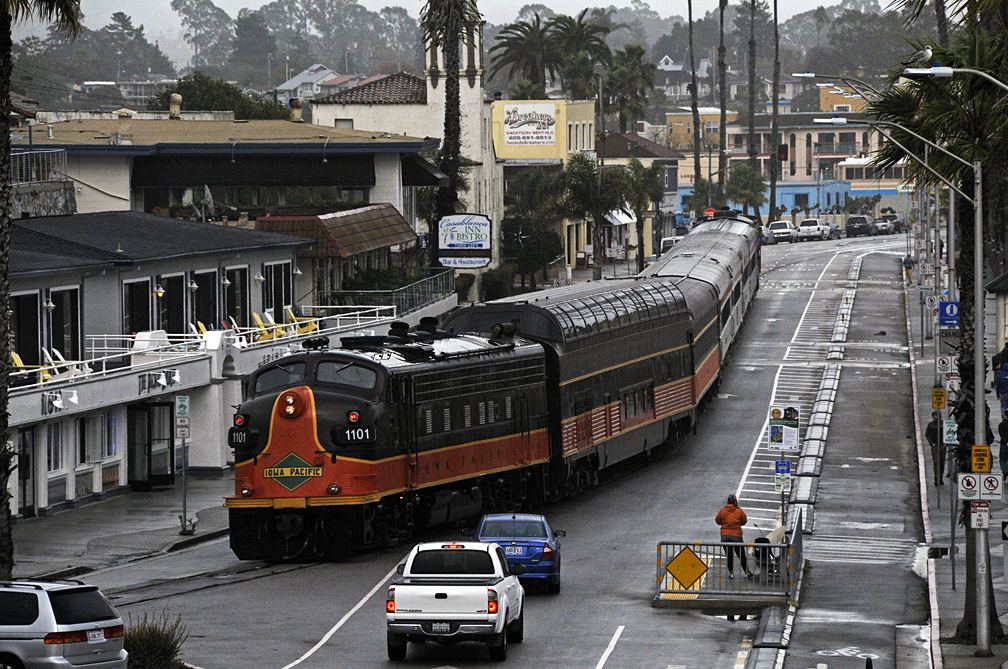
Iowa Pacific #1101 in downtown Santa Cruz (2012)

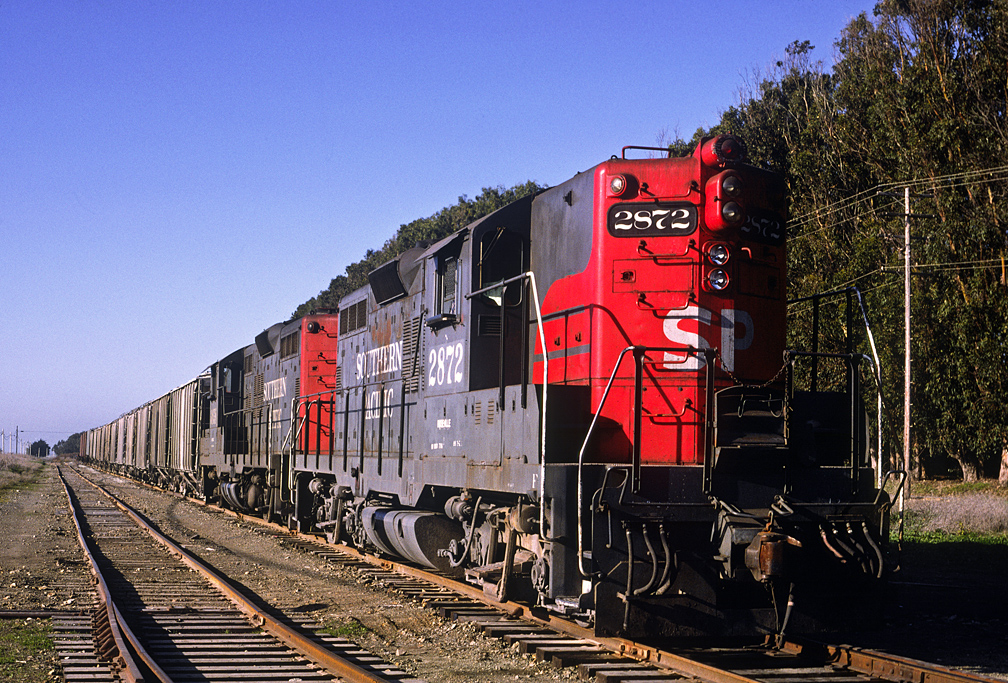
SP #2872 at Davenport (1985)

The Santa Cruz Railroad inaugurated rail service to Watsonville in 1876, having started work on the line from Santa Cruz in 1873. A second rail line was completed in 1880, connecting the city to the San Francisco Bay Area via a narrow-gauge railway built by the South Pacific Coast Railroad over the Southern Coast Ranges. Both companies were acquired by the Southern Pacific by 1887, which began offering Suntan Special excursion service from San Jose to Santa Cruz via the over-the-mountain line in July 1927. After a winter storm shut down the mountain line and CA-17 opened paralleling its route, Southern Pacific rerouted Suntan Special service starting in summer 1940 to the longer overland route via Gilroy and Pajaro until the final excursions over Labor Day weekend, 1959; although the route was much longer, the travel time increased by only 30 minutes because the gentler terrain allowed higher speeds.

In 1996, when the Southern Pacific was being acquired and merged into Union Pacific, the Santa Cruz County Regional Transportation Commission (SCCRTC) ran several demonstration trains, including the "return of the Suntan Special" (contracted Caltrain service from San Jose to Santa Cruz via Watsonville, Aptos, and Capitola), "Coastal Cruzer" (San Jose to Santa Cruz via Aptos and Capitola using a diesel multiple unit IC3 Flexliner), and "First Night Trolley" (shuttle service within Santa Cruz using another DMU, the RegioSprinter), each attracting more than 1,000 passengers. On October 12, 2012, SCCRTC acquired the Santa Cruz Branch from Union Pacific, as the Class 1 operator was not interested in allowing passenger service. A demonstration of a battery-dominant hydrogen fuel cell streetcar manufactured by TIG/m along this line was held in October 2021. Coast Futura offered the service without collecting fares to determine the feasibility of rail transit operation.

Potential Santa Cruz Branch stations
Location	Station
Pajaro	Pajaro
Watsonville	Downtown Watsonville
Watsonville	Ohlone Parkway†
La Selva Beach	La Selva Beach†^
Aptos	Aptos Village
Aptos	Cabrillo College‡
Capitola	Park Avenue/Cabrillo†
Capitola	Capitola
Capitola	41st Avenue
Santa Cruz	17th Avenue
Santa Cruz	Seabright
Santa Cruz	Boardwalk†^
Santa Cruz	Downtown Santa Cruz/Boardwalk‡
Santa Cruz	Downtown Santa Cruz Depot Park†
Santa Cruz	Bay Street
Santa Cruz	Fair/Almar Avenue†
Santa Cruz	Natural Arches
† = LRT alternative only ‡ = CRT alternative only^ = Seasonal in LRT alternative

The rail right-of-way owned by SCCRTC is sufficiently wide in almost all places to accommodate a single track alongside the planned 32 mi-long (51 km), 12 ft-wide (3.7 m) Monterey Bay Sanctuary Scenic Trail (MBSST), closely following the shoreline of Monterey Bay from the San Mateo County line to Pajaro. The first segment of the trail in Santa Cruz, stretching 2.1 mi (3.4 km) north from milepost 28.6, is called the North Coast segment and connects to Davenport; work on North Coast is scheduled to start in fall 2024 and will take approximately a year to complete. When finished, MBSST will extend the existing Monterey Bay Coastal Trail, spanning approximately 50 mi (80 km) from Lovers Point at Pacific Grove in the south to Wilder Ranch in the north.

=== Phase 3 — Castroville ===
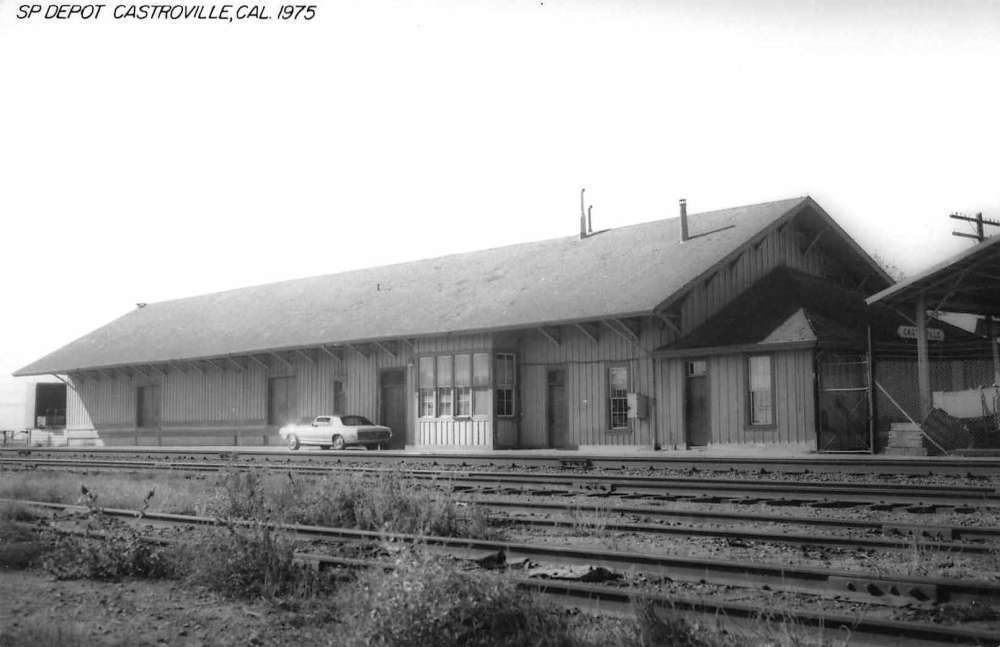
Castroville depot (1975)

The final phase of the project would add Castroville station, another multimodal infill station that will be built at Castroville, connecting to a new planned local express transit service along the Monterey Branch Line down the Monterey Peninsula to Monterey via Marina.

The Castroville station plans have received environmental clearance, but the $27 million required for construction have not yet been identified.

Monterey Branch

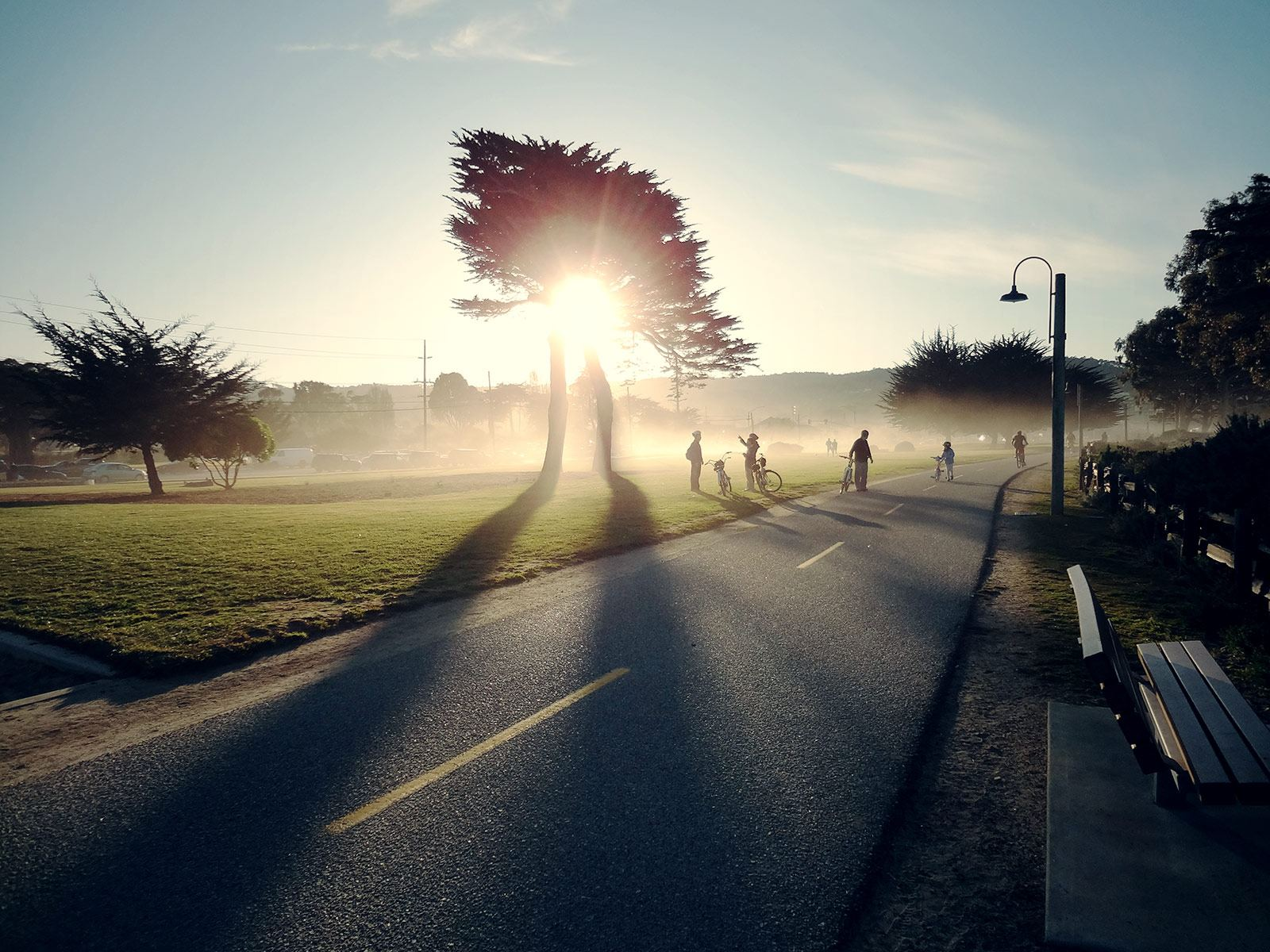
The Monterey Bay Coastal Recreational Trail follows the abandoned rail right-of-way in Monterey (2013).

The Monterey Branch is a 19.6 mi (31.5 km) long rail line which was completed in 1879 by Southern Pacific, connecting Castroville to Lake Majella in Pacific Grove. SP operated regular Del Monte passenger service between Monterey and San Francisco from 1881 until 1971, as the length of the intercity service was just 125 mi (201 km), under the 150 mi (240 km) cutoff for Amtrak to take over operations. After passenger service was discontinued, the rail line continued in use for freight until 1978, when the line was shortened to the crossing at Contra Costa Street in Seaside and continued to be used by United States Army trains transporting material to Fort Ord until the early 1990s. Meanwhile, the cities of Monterey and Pacific Grove began acquiring segments of the southern/western end of the right-of-way in 1976, opening the first section of what would become the 18 mi (29 km) Monterey Bay Coastal Trail in 1980. The Passenger Rail Feasibility Study kicked off in 1992, and made recommendations for inter- and intra-county passenger rail service, with the goals of connecting Monterey County to the Bay Area and alleviating heavy traffic along CA-1.

Monterey station

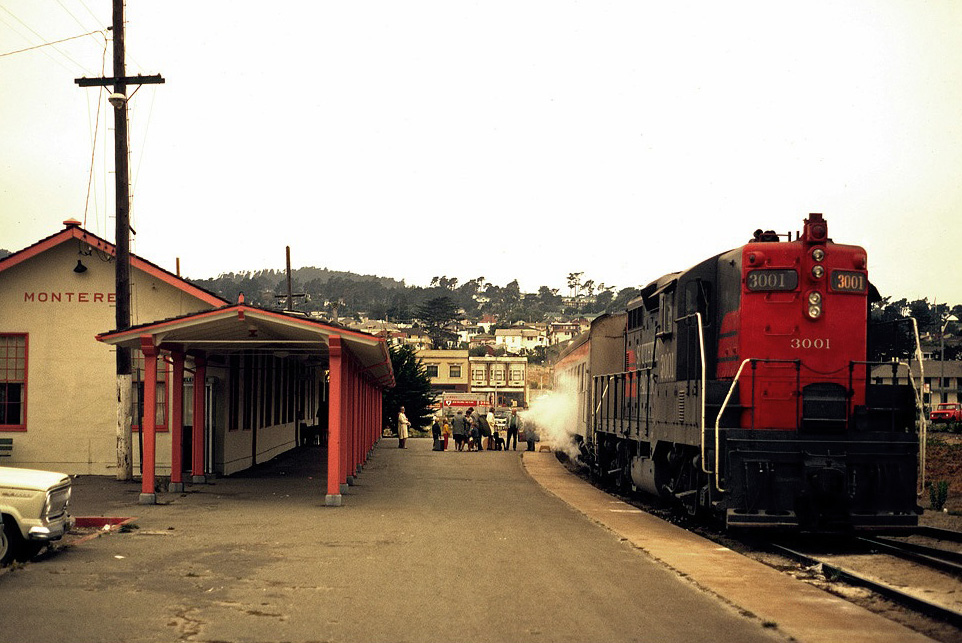
Del Monte at Monterey (Sep 1970)

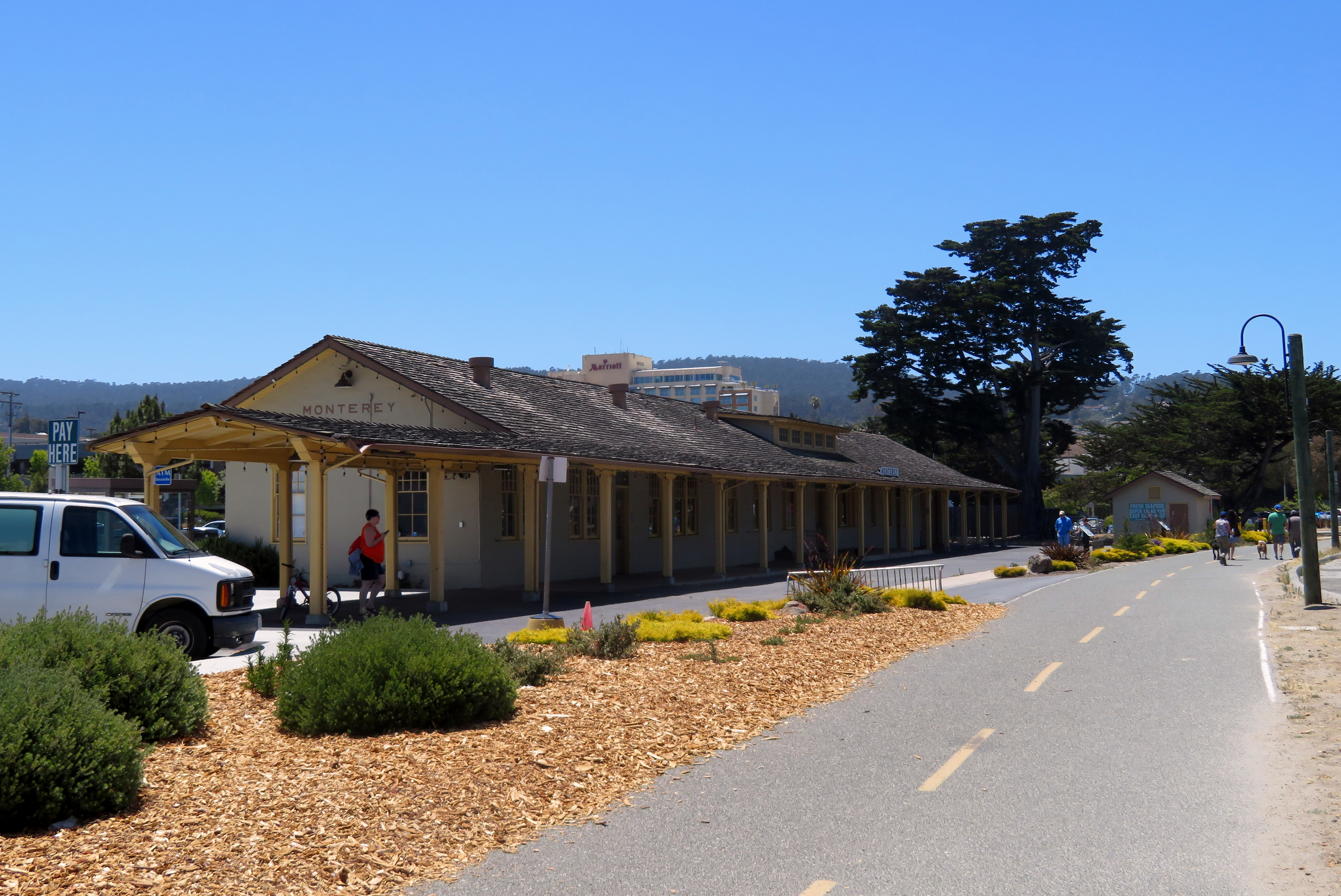
Monterey and the Coastal Trail (Jun 2018)

TAMC contracted Amtrak to run a Talgo 8 trainset from San Francisco to Fort Ord on June 12, 1999, to demonstrate its viability and build interest in regular service, but poor track conditions forced the cancellation of further demonstrations. On July 13 of that year, Governor Gray Davis signed SB886 into law, which allowed TAMC to participate in any passenger rail service agreement between Caltrans and Amtrak in the San Francisco-San Jose-Monterey corridor. In September 2003, TAMC purchased the remaining Monterey Branch Line right-of-way between Seaside and Castroville for $9.4 million and began planning to build a light rail transit service using the existing and replaced rails. Parsons performed an alternatives analysis in 2008, with updates in 2009 and 2011, identifying light rail as the locally preferred alternative. The Alternatives Analysis for the Monterey Peninsula Fixed Guideway Corridor Study was again updated in 2012 by Kimley-Horn. TAMC intended the project to quality under the FTA Small Starts threshold of $250 M, as a more expensive project would have to be funded under New Starts, which are intended for more densely populated areas and adds significant difficulties for qualification.

Potential Monterey Branch Line LRT stations
Station	City	Distance from Coast Line
Castroville†‡	Castroville	0.00 mi (0 km)
Blackie Road‡	Castroville	0.65 mi (1.05 km)
Marina†	Marina	5.97 mi (9.61 km)
Beach	Marina	6.51 mi (10.48 km)
Reservation	Marina	7.08 mi (11.39 km)
Palm	Marina	7.45 mi (11.99 km)
University	Marina	9.15 mi (14.73 km)
First Street	Seaside	9.73 mi (15.66 km)
Playa	Seaside/Sand City	12.63 mi (20.33 km)
Contra Costa	Seaside/Sand City	13.50 mi (21.73 km)
Casa Verde	Monterey	14.39 mi (23.16 km)
USN Postgraduate School	Monterey	14.85 mi (23.90 km)
El Estero Park	Monterey	15.46 mi (24.88 km)
Figueroa	Monterey	15.72 mi (25.30 km)
Portola Plaza†	Monterey	15.99 mi (25.73 km)
† = potential terminus; one alternative (LRT-1) has the line terminate at Marina with bus connections to Salinas and Castroville, while the extended alternative (LRT-2) has the line continuing all the way to Castroville ‡ = station proposed in extended alternative (LRT-2) only

Funding has been uncertain and the light rail project, which would run 16 mi (26 km) from Castroville to Monterey, has been paused. While the application for federal transit subsidies is being considered, TAMC has asked Monterey-Salinas Transit to run bus rapid transit service over the right-of-way. The MST SURF! BRT service will run over 6 mi (9.7 km) of the Monterey Branch Line right-of-way, between Marina and Sand City / Seaside. The busway would run parallel to the tracks and CA-1, between the rails and Beach Range Road, stretching from Contra Costa Street (in Seaside) to Reservation Road (in Marina). SURF! would be MST's second BRT line, following the Jazz Line connecting Seaside and Monterey.

=== List of stations ===
Ordered from north to south, with milepost markers denoting distance from San Francisco 4th and King

Monterey County Rail Extension stations
Station	Distance (Note: Milepost distance from San Francisco)	Connecting services
Pajaro/Watsonville	97.0	Santa Cruz Branch
Castroville	106.5	Monterey Branch Line
Salinas	114.9	Coast Starlight; Coast Line (continues)
