= Monterey Branch Line =

Railway line in Monterey County, California

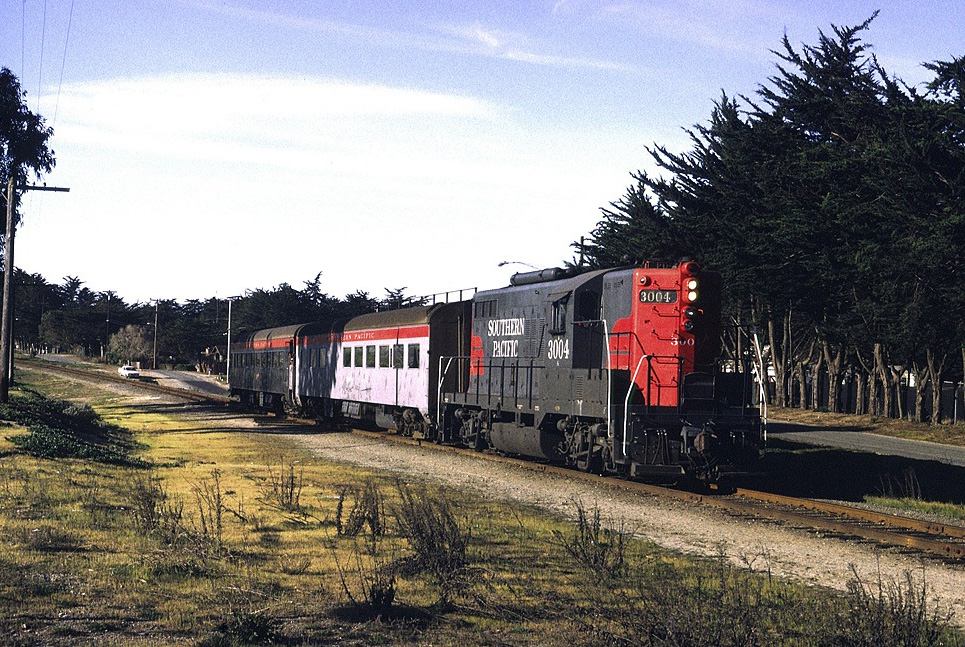
Del Monte running through Marina, 1971

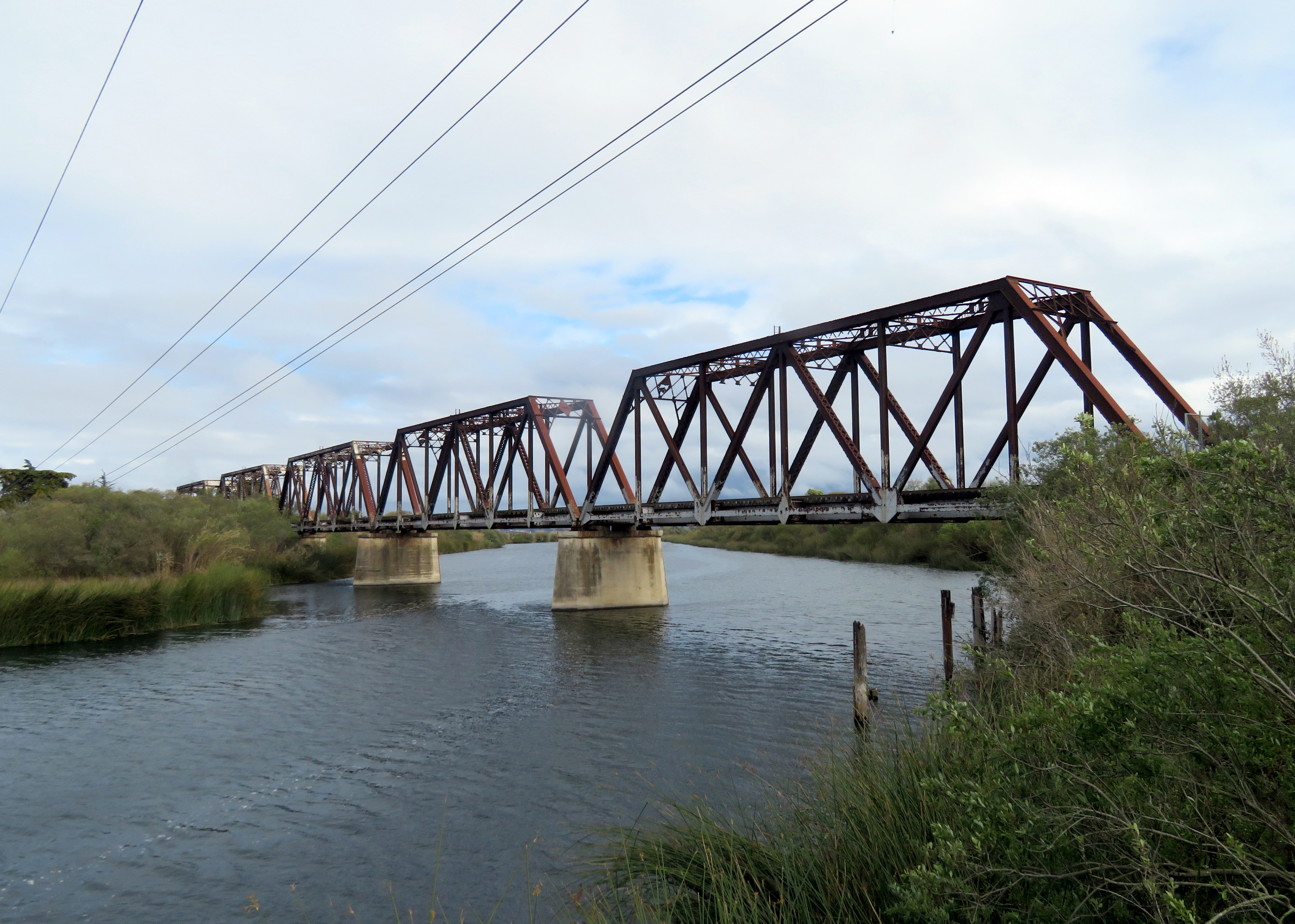
The Salinas River bridge, March 2020

The Monterey Branch Line is a railway line located in Monterey County, California. It runs 16 miles (26 km) between Castroville, where it connects to the Union Pacific Coast Line, and Monterey, formerly running as far as Pacific Grove. It is roughly paralleled by California State Route 1.

== History ==
Originally built by the Monterey and Salinas Valley Railroad, the line was the first narrow gauge railroad to operate in California with 3-foot gauge tracks laid between Salinas and Monterey. As was common when new railroads were built, freight rates dropped to a fraction of what they had been previously, compared to what they had been with wagon transportation or existing rail lines.

However, the new line saw financial issues very soon after opening and was purchased by a subsidiary of the Southern Pacific on September 29, 1879. A new branch north to Castroville was constructed by the new owners and the western portion converted to standard gauge with the Hotel Del Monte opening the following year. This allowed direct passenger leisure services to run from San Francisco. The line came under the auspices of Southern Pacific proper in 1888 and was extended west past Pacific Grove to a facility at Lake Mejella. By the 1950s, sand made the bulk of freight moved along the route. Passenger rail service ended with the cancellation of the Del Monte after April 30, 1971, when Amtrak took over passenger rail services in the United States. Tracks were realigned with the construction of State Route 1, but the rails west of Seaside were abandoned in 1979. The tracks in Pacific Grove and Monterey were removed in the 1980s and the former right-of-way is now the Monterey Bay Recreation Trail.

The Salinas River bridge was damaged in the 1989 Loma Prieta earthquake — reconstruction time as well as the closure of Fort Ord in 1993 left almost no activity on the line, and it was abandoned soon after that. The full line was purchased by the Transportation Authority for Monterey County (TAMC) in 2003 for $9.3 million ($15.8 million in 2025 adjusted for inflation).

== Planned restoration ==
Restoration of Del Monte-like service to Monterey had been identified as early as the Caltrans 1984–89 Rail passenger development plan. Amtrak declined to operate such service, but operations under Southern Pacific (by then running state-subsidized services) were studied with ridership forecast developed. The TAMC opted to initiate Caltrain service to Salinas Intermodal Transportation Center in 2021.

TAMC has put forward plans to rebuild the line and commence a rail service between Monterey and Castroville. The project calls for diesel light rail trains to operate at twelve stations from Custom House Plaza in Monterey and the future Castroville Caltrain station. The route was included in the 2018 California State Rail Plan as eligible for further study in 2022 and integration into the state rail network by 2040.

As of 2024, Monterey–Salinas Transit plans to construct a busway on the former Monterey Branch Line between Marina and Sand City.

From 2021 to 2025 part of the line was used by the tourist railfan group Handcar Tours, which hosted rides on manually-powered handcars and electrically powered railbikes.
