= Suntan Special =

Summer excursion train service in California, USA

Overview
- Service type: Seasonal excursion train
- Status: Discontinued
- First service: 1927
- Last service: September 1959
- Former operator: Southern Pacific Railroad

Route
- Termini: San Jose, California; San Francisco, California; Oakland, California; Santa Cruz Beach Boardwalk - Casa del Rey Hotel
- Average journey time: 3 hours 15 minutes
- Service frequency: Summer Sundays and holidays

The Suntan Special (sometimes styled as Sun Tan Special) was a summer excursion train service operated by the Southern Pacific Railroad between San Francisco and Santa Cruz, California, from 1927 to 1959.

== History ==
When Suntan Special service began, trains operated from San Jose along the over-the-mountain South Pacific Coast Railroad (SPCR) route through Los Gatos until that line was destroyed by storm damage in February 1940. Service resumed starting in April 1940 over a longer overland route, continuing down the Coast Subdivision mainline from San Jose through Gilroy, turning at Watsonville Junction in Pajaro onto the Santa Cruz Branch originally established by the Santa Cruz Railroad, and finishing the trip to Santa Cruz via Watsonville, Aptos, and Capitola. Regular passenger service along the SPCR line was short-turned at Los Gatos, with buses continuing to and from Santa Cruz.

The first train ran to Santa Cruz via Los Gatos over the Fourth of July weekend in 1927 and was called the "Popular Excursion"; it was simply a way to use rolling stock made idle by the holiday, but proved to be successful enough that additional excursions were run on Labor Day (September 5) and Admission Day (Sept. 9) that season. For 1928, excursions ran every two weeks (plus holidays) starting from Memorial Day (May 30, 1928) until Admission Day, and weekly service started in 1929. The Suntan Special name was applied starting from October 1930. The original service held departures from San Jose (Cahill station) until the departure point shifted to San Francisco (Third and Townsend Depot) in 1932 with at least three sections every summer Sunday and holiday. A section from Oakland was added in 1934. In 1932, approximately 3,500 passengers from the San Francisco Bay Area each paid $1.25 (equivalent to $29 in 2024 adjusted for inflation) for a round trip visit to the Santa Cruz Beach Boardwalk. Up to seven double-headed sections originating in San Francisco, Oakland, or San Jose were required to carry these passengers. Service was suspended by World War II from 1941 through 1946, but resumed in July 1947, carrying about 900 passengers per trip. Before the war, the seasonal service operated from Memorial Day weekend through the end of September; this was shortened to Independence Day through Labor Day in 1947. Postwar service consisted of one round-trip excursion train each Sunday and an extra trip on the Fourth of July.

The train would reach Santa Cruz at approximately 11:30 AM and depart on the return trip at approximately 6:15 PM. The train consists usually had an open-air observation car at the rear and featured on-board snacks and coffee served from trolleys. Average one-way trip time was 3 hours, 15 minutes from San Francisco, as the poor condition of the road bed between Watsonville Junction (Pajaro) and Santa Cruz limited the train to just 18 mph (29 km/h), taking an hour to traverse the Santa Cruz Branch off the Coast Subdivision mainline. The change from the over-the-mountain route through Los Gatos to the overland route via Watsonville Junction (Pajaro) increased the trip time by only 10 minutes.

In 1956, the train carried a peak of 15,485 passengers on 13 excursion trips taken that season, but this declined to 7,752 passengers for the 1959 season. The last train ran in September 1959. The passenger agent for SP, Joseph B. Haggerty, called it a "money-losing train."

== Legacy ==
Postwar improvements to freeways and automobiles shortened trip times to Santa Cruz and hastened the end of Suntan Special service, but California State Route 17 (SR-17), the highway on the direct over-the-mountain route from San Jose to Santa Cruz, became congested, prompting the California Department of Transportation to propose widening and straightening the freeway in 1971, expanding it to six lanes of traffic, with enough room to expand it to eight plus two shoulders and a median. As an alternative, Lockheed proposed restoring the rail line from Los Gatos, which was estimated to cost $50 million, 1/6 the cost of widening the freeway. Santa Cruz County residents successfully lobbied Caltrans to de-list SR-17 from the state freeway system in 1974, removing the threat to widen that road. At the time, Amtrak and Southern Pacific were asked by U.S. Representative Burt Talcott if they would be willing to revive the Suntan Special using the overland route via Watsonville Junction; Amtrak vice president for governmental affairs Gerald D. Morgan replied "the proposed service could not in fact run at a profit". Scenic Railways, Inc. evaluated the feasibility of bringing the route back as a seasonal weekend excursion, but County Supervisor Dan Forbus said it was unlikely to alleviate much of the traffic over SR-17.

SR-17 again was characterized as "crowded [and] dangerous" in 1984, when a newspaper article described efforts to revive the over-the-mountain railroad to alleviate traffic. However, these were opposed by the county Board of Supervisors; Supervisor Gary Patton stated "We are not in favor of construction of a route over the hill, either on the old Los Gatos alignment, or on a new alignment, because it would open Santa Cruz for major commuter traffic". Three studies for passenger rail service to Santa Cruz were conducted in 1994, including a potential revival of the Suntan Special using the overland route.

On Saturday, May 18, 1996, a Suntan Special revival was operated by Caltrain using the overland route via Watsonville Junction (Pajaro) from San Jose. That day, Caltrain offered a single-day roundtrip excursion. As an alternative, an overnight deluxe package was offered for $149 per person, including an unlimited ride pass at the Beach Boardwalk, hotel stay at the Dream Inn, and a round-trip ticket on the Santa Cruz, Big Trees and Pacific Railway, with the return trip being operated on Sunday by Amtrak using a diesel multiple unit train from Denmark.
