= MCRX =

MCRX is an acronym used for the musical group My Chemical Romance for the 2016 reissue album The Black Parade/Living with Ghosts.

MCRX may also refer to:

- Marcus Rail Transport, a freight rail operator in Colorado, United States
- Monterey County Rail Extension, a project to extend the Caltrain commuter rail line to San Francisco from its present terminus in Gilroy to Salinas, California
