= Santa Cruz Branch =

Historic railway

Route map

The Santa Cruz Branch, also called the Santa Cruz Branch Rail Line (SCBRL), is a partially-active rail line in Santa Cruz County, California. At full length, it ran between Davenport and Watsonville Junction, where it connected to the Coast Line. Most of the line is inactive; a portion of the eastern end is used for freight, while the Santa Cruz, Big Trees and Pacific Railway uses a short segment along the Santa Cruz Beach Boardwalk.

== Route ==
The right of way begins at Watsonville Junction, where it interchanges with Union Pacific Railroad's Coast Line. The line features street running sections in Watsonville and Santa Cruz where trains interact directly with roadway traffic. The Santa Cruz, Big Trees and Pacific Railway operates part of its heritage railway service along SCMB tracks from the Santa Cruz Beach Boardwalk to that railroad's main line west of the Beach Street roundabout, before turning onto its own tracks at the Santa Cruz wye towards Felton on the former South Pacific Coast Railroad mainline. After leaving Santa Cruz, the line runs parallel to California State Route 1 until Davenport, where the tracks end.

== History ==
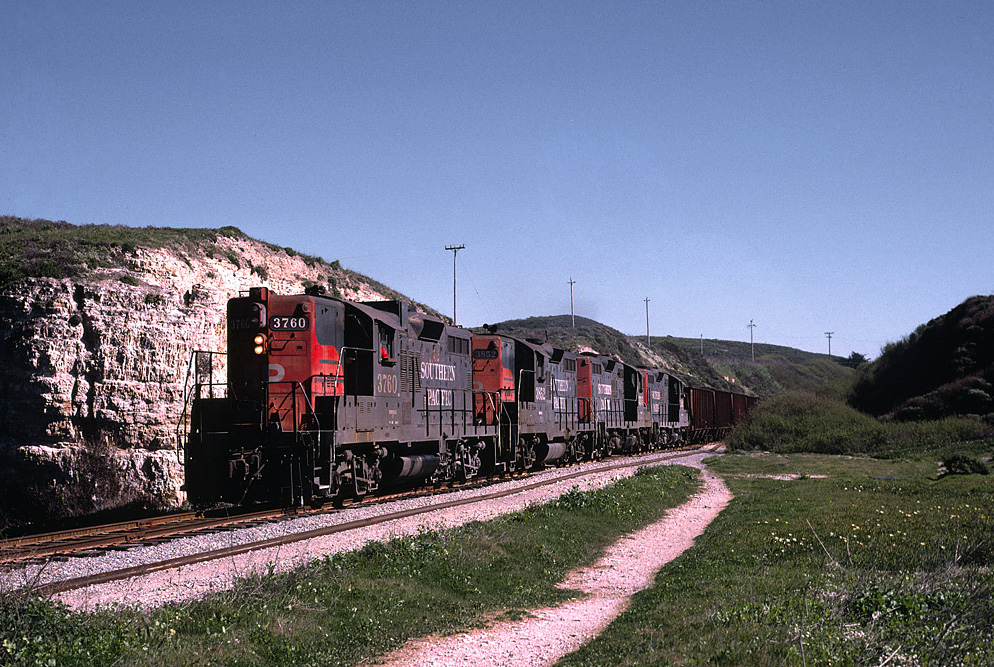
Southern Pacific freight train at Davenport in 1988

The line was constructed as the Santa Cruz Railroad between 1873–1876 and was laid with narrow gauge rail. The town of Watsonville was opposed to the railroad and did not grant permission for the line to run through the town; instead, it met the Coast Line at Pajaro Junction to the east. Service began on May 7, 1876. The line was rerouted through Watsonville midyear. Damage from winter rains plus the 1880 opening of a more direct Oakland–Santa Cruz route (the South Pacific Coast Railroad) caused the company to enter bankruptcy in 1879 and cease operating in February 1881. It was sold to a Southern Pacific Railroad (SP) subsidiary at judicial sale later that year.

Conversion to standard gauge began in 1882 and was completed in November 1883. A 3.7-mile (6.0 km) branch from Aptos to Loma Prieta was built by the subsidiary Loma Prieta Railroad in 1882–1883. Both lines were merged into the Pajaro and Santa Cruz Railroad in 1884, a Southern Pacific organization. That company was formally merged into the SP in 1888; the lines became the Santa Cruz Branch and Loma Prieta Branch.

In 1905, the SP and the Ocean Shore Railroad both attempted to build lines between San Francisco and Santa Cruz up the west side of the peninsula. The SP line, constructed by subsidiary Coast Line Railroad, was constructed to the cement kiln in Davenport; the parallel Ocean Shore Line made it slightly further to Swanton. The Coast Line became the SP Davenport Branch in 1917. The Loma Prieta Branch ended service in November 1927 and was abandoned in 1928. Passenger service on the Davenport Branch ended on August 1, 1932; Pacific Greyhound bus lines took up passenger operations as a replacement.

The Davenport kiln provided one hundred carloads weekly of inbound coal and outbound cement. Inbound lumber and outbound refrigerator cars of locally grown Brussels sprouts, artichokes, and lettuce provided additional freight traffic. Suntan Special summer excursion trains carried 900 passengers per trip from San Francisco to the Santa Cruz Beach Boardwalk from July 1947 to September 1959. There was a railway turntable and 5-stall roundhouse in Santa Cruz, but steam locomotives were replaced by EMD GP9s in 1955. Daily local freight service was replaced in 1982 by tri-weekly branch line trains operating at 20 mi (32 km) per hour including a caboose until 1986.

In 1985, F. Norman Clark, owner of the Roaring Camp & Big Trees Narrow Gauge Railroad, purchased the 8.87-mile (14.27 km) branch running from Santa Cruz to the end of the line at Olympia, and leased 1.5 miles (2.4 km) of the Santa Cruz Branch from the junction to the Santa Cruz Beach Boardwalk. The new standard-gauge line was given the name Santa Cruz, Big Trees and Pacific Railway, and operates a seasonal excursion passenger train.

The Pajaro River bridge was damaged by the 1989 Loma Prieta earthquake. The line came under ownership of Union Pacific in 1996.

=== State ownership ===
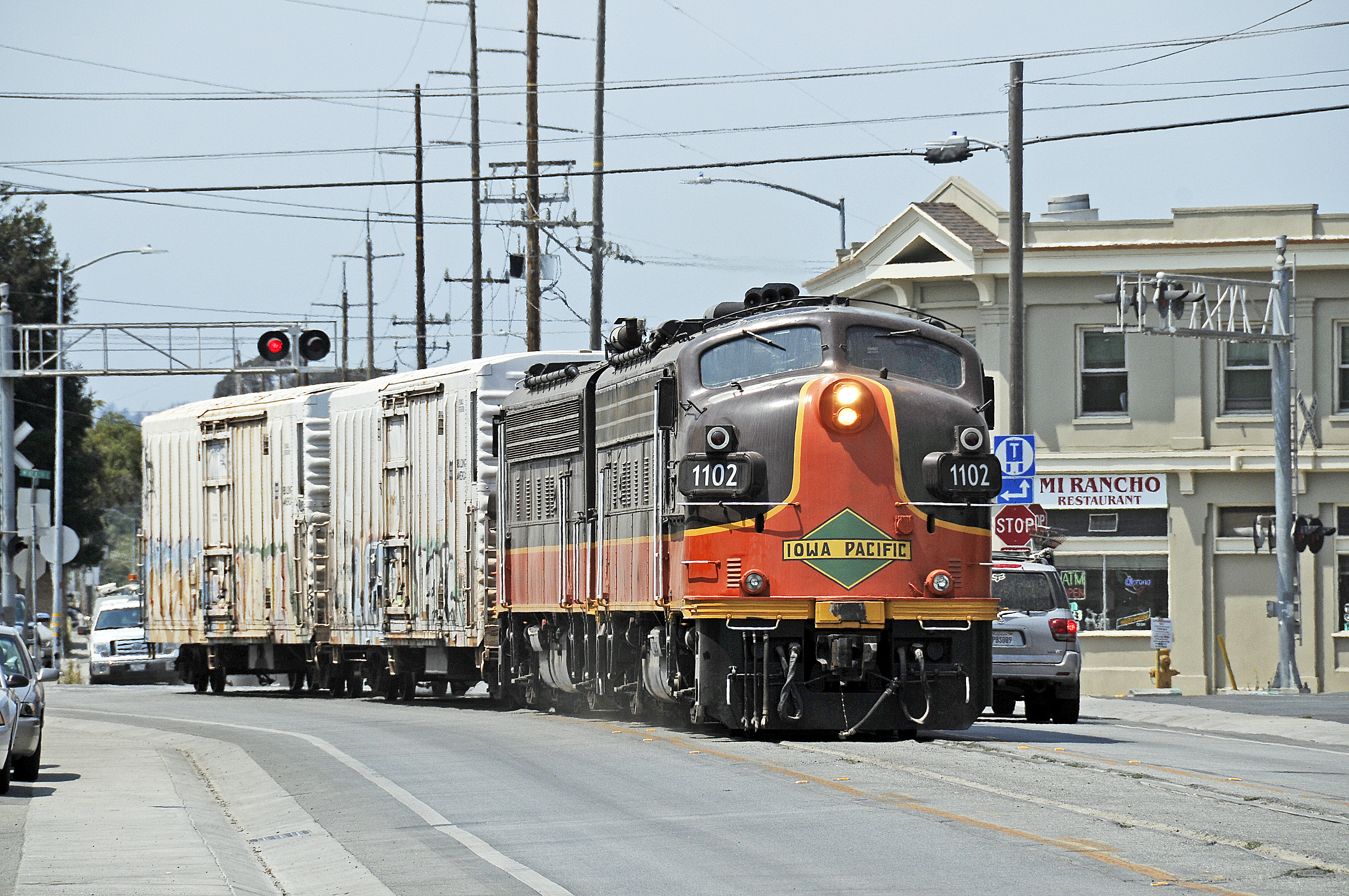
Santa Cruz and Monterey Bay Railway freight train in 2014

The Santa Cruz County Regional Transportation Commission purchased the rail corridor in 2012. At that time, freight operations were contracted out to Iowa Pacific Holdings, which began service in November 2012 under the name Santa Cruz and Monterey Bay Railway. In 2018, Progressive Rail, Inc. was chosen as the replacement freight operator under a 10-year contract, operating the line under the name St. Paul and Pacific Railroad. The Transportation Commission is studying the possibility of rehabilitating the rail line for a new commuter rail service or rebuilding the corridor for bus rapid transit. A demonstration streetcar operated over the branch in October 2021. The line sustained major damage in the 2022-2023 storms. in June 2024, the public was given a chance to weigh in on future passenger rail and a trail. The plan could include rerouted sections and an elevated portion at the Santa Cruz Beach Boardwalk.
