= Porter–Vallejo Mansion =

Historic house in California, United States

- U.S. National Register of Historic Places
- U.S. Historic district
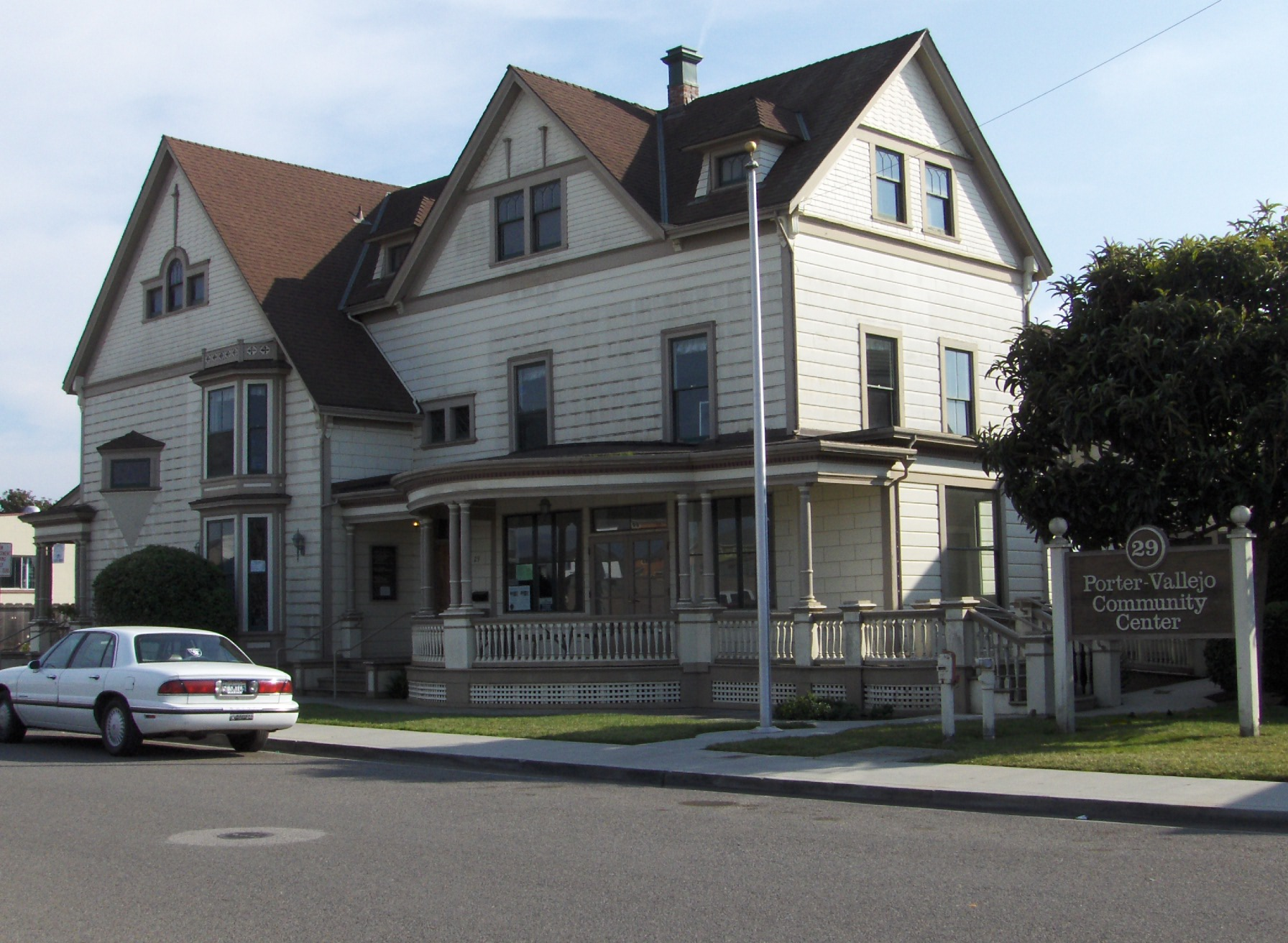

- Location within California Location within the United States
- Location: 29 Bishop St., Pajaro, California
- Coordinates: 36°54′6″N 121°44′56″W
- Area: 0.5 acres (0.20 ha)
- Built: 1850s; 1870s; 1895-1899
- Architect: Weeks, William Henry
- Architectural style: Queen Anne
- NRHP reference No.: 89002273
- Added to NRHP: January 4, 1990

The Porter–Vallejo Mansion, located at 29 Bishop St. in Pajaro, California, is a historic Queen Anne style house that was designed by architect William Henry Weeks. It is listed on the National Register of Historic Places.

It is significant both for its architecture and for its association with John T. Porter, a business leader and "a central figure locally in the complex issues surrounding California's anti-Chinese movement in 1888."

The house was built first as a salt-box in the 1850s by Antone Vallejo. It was moved to its present site and renovated in the 1870s by John T. Porter, bringing it into Gothic Revival style that was then in fashion. Then, during 1895–99, William Henry Weeks designed and supervised modification into Queen Anne style, but saving many elements of the 1874 Gothic Revival building.

It was listed on the National Register of Historic Places in 1990. The listing included four contributing buildings.

The building is currently owned by the County of Monterey and used for county offices.
