= Pajaro/Watsonville station =

Railway station in California, United States

Pajaro/Watsonville

General information
- Location: Pajaro, California
- Coordinates: 36.8914°N 121.7470°W
- Line: UP Coast Subdivision

Other information
- Status: In planning

History
- Opened: 1871 (SP)
- Closed: 1971
- Rebuilt: 1949
- Former names: Pajaro; Watsonville Junction
- Original company: Southern Pacific
Former services
Preceding station	Southern Pacific Railroad	Following station
Gilroy toward San Francisco	Coast Line	Castroville toward Los Angeles
Future services
Preceding station	Amtrak	Following station
Gilroy toward Auburn	Capitol Corridor	Castroville toward Salinas
San Jose toward Seattle	Coast Starlight	Salinas toward Los Angeles
Preceding station	Caltrain	Following station
Gilroy toward San Jose Diridon	South County Connector	Castroville toward Salinas
Location

Pajaro/Watsonville station is a proposed train station that will serve both Pajaro and Watsonville, California. The station is expected to open after track improvements in the area and service commences to Salinas as part of the Monterey County Rail Extension. It will be located in Watsonville Junction near the corner of Salinas Road and Lewis Road, adjacent to the former Southern Pacific Railroad depot and current Union Pacific Railroad office. The station will eventually serve Caltrain, Capitol Corridor, and Coast Starlight. Construction of the station is expected to begin in 2027.

== History ==
The Southern Pacific Railroad was built out to Pajaro by November 26, 1871. The railroad changed the name to Watsonville Junction in 1913 to aide travelers unfamiliar with Spanish pronunciation. A new station building was constructed in 1949.

The overnight passenger train The Lark stopped at Watsonville Junction between 1941 and 1968. The Del Monte served the old station until service was discontinued on April 30, 1971, the day before Amtrak took over intercity passenger train service in the United States. The 1949-built depot was demolished in 2011.

Funding was awarded to the Transportation Agency for Monterey County in 2024 from the CalSTA Transit & Intercity Rail Capital Program for design and engineering the new station.
