= Monterey Bay Coastal Recreational Trail =

Recreational trail in a popular area of the California coast

Monterey Bay Coastal Recreation Trail
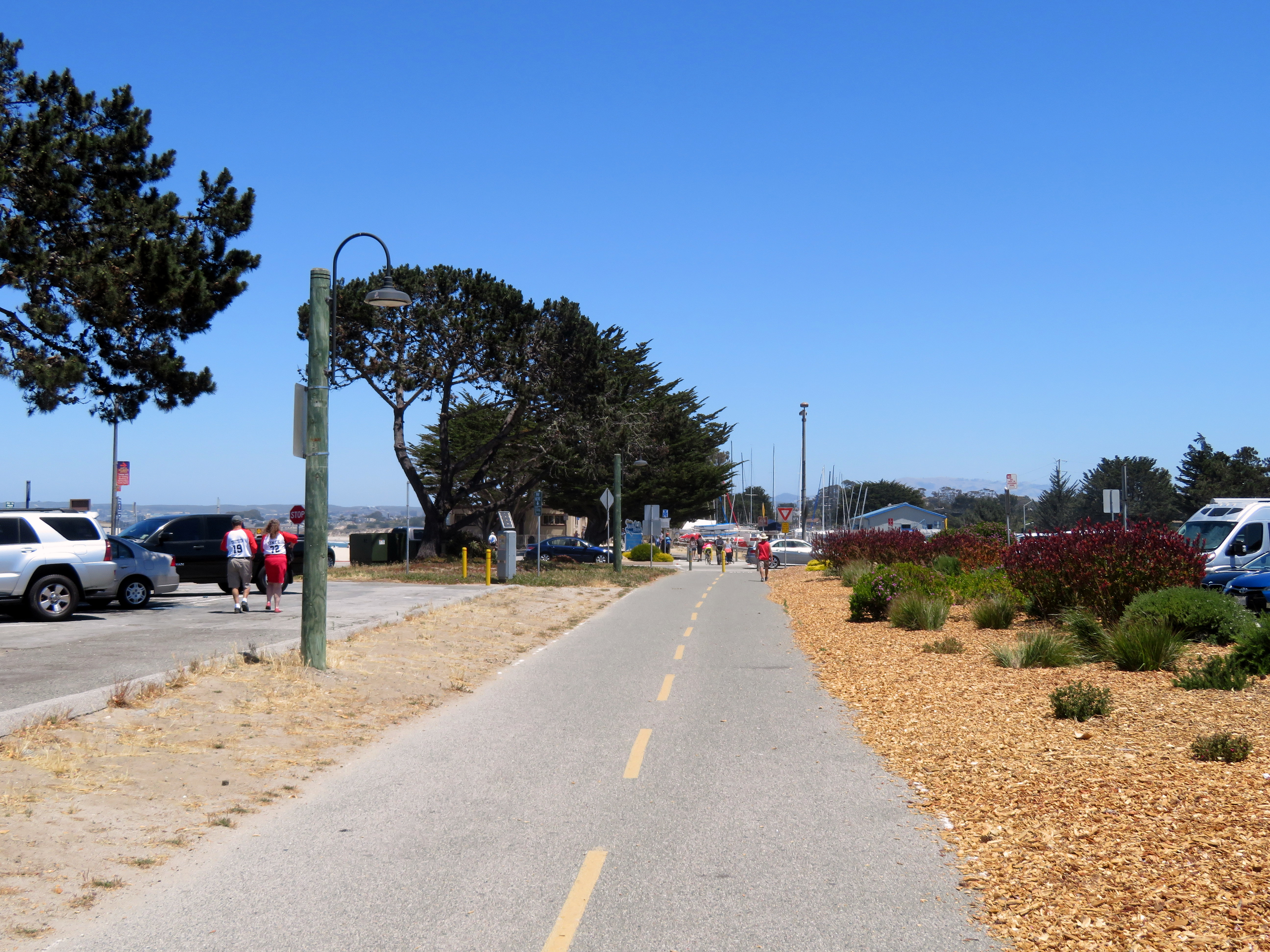
- Length: 18 miles (29 km)
- Use: Hiking, biking
- Elevation gain/loss: 320 feet (98 m) gain approximately
- Difficulty: Easy
- Season: All
- Sights: Asilomar State Beach, Asilomar State Marine Reserve, Cannery Row, Edward F. Ricketts State Marine Conservation Area, Fisherman's Wharf, Fort Ord Dunes State Park, Lovers Point State Marine Reserve, Monterey Bay, Marina State Beach, Monterey State Beach, Monterey Bay Aquarium, Pacific Grove Marine Gardens State Marine Conservation Area, Pacific Grove Municipal Golf Links, Point Pinos Lighthouse, Presidio
- Surface: Asphalt
- Website: Official website

The Monterey Bay Coastal Recreation Trail (or Monterey Bay Coastal Trail for short) is a trail that runs along the coast of the Monterey Bay. It stretches for 18 miles, between Castroville, California and Pacific Grove, California, and passes several tourist attractions along the way, including Cannery Row, the Monterey Bay Aquarium, and Fisherman's Wharf.

== History ==
Much of the Monterey Bay Coastal Recreation Trail follows the former route of the Southern Pacific Railroad, which connected Castroville to Fisherman's Wharf and Cannery Row. When the railroad was abandoned, the Monterey Peninsula Regional Park District partnered with the Coastal Conservancy, as well as the cities of Pacific Grove, Monterey, and Seaside, to create the coastal trail in 1986.

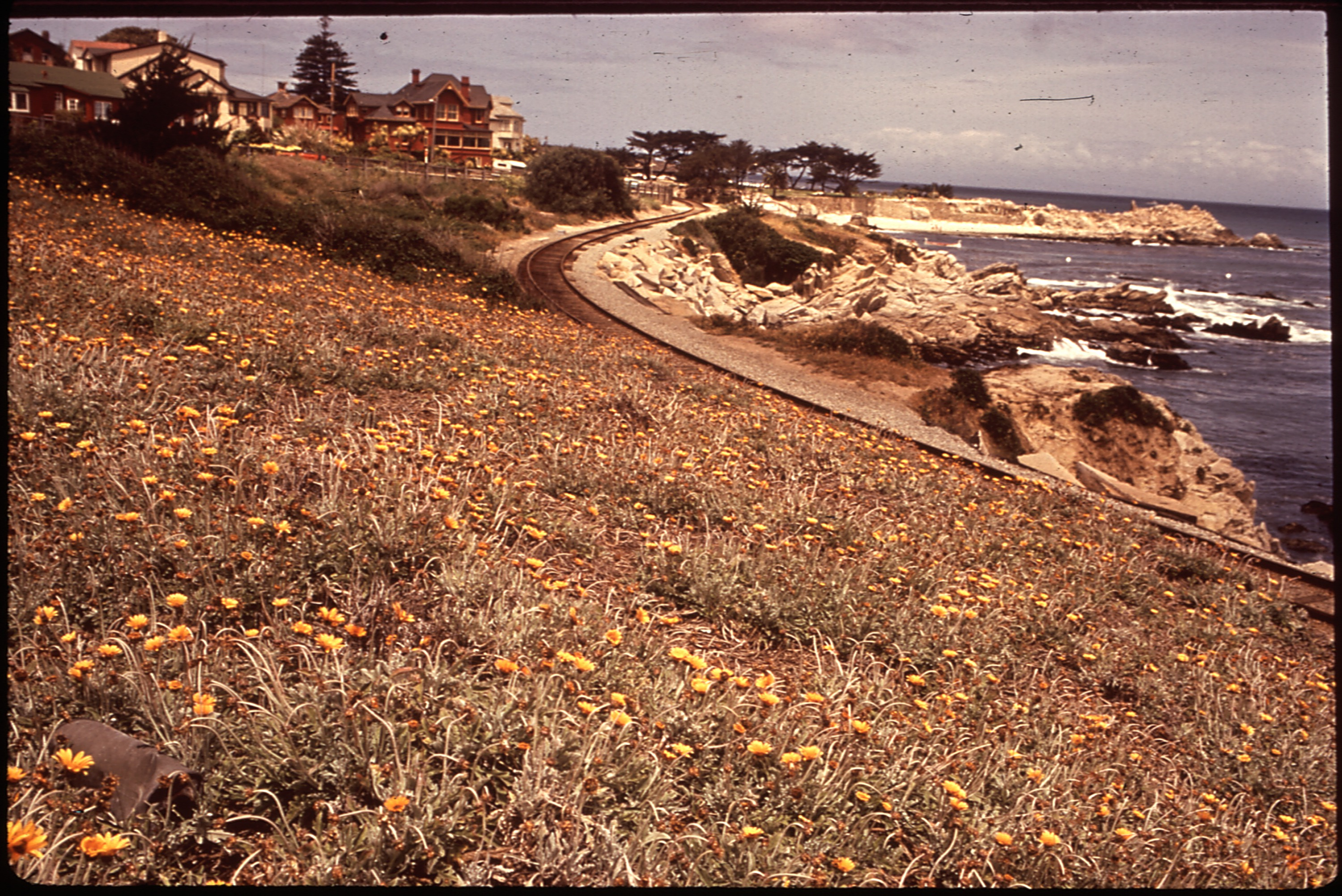
Historical photo of the Southern Pacific Railroad route, near Lovers Point Beach in Pacific Grove, from May 1972, by Dick Rowan for NARA (National Archives and Records Administration). The railroad track has since been replaced with the Monterey Bay Coastal Trail.

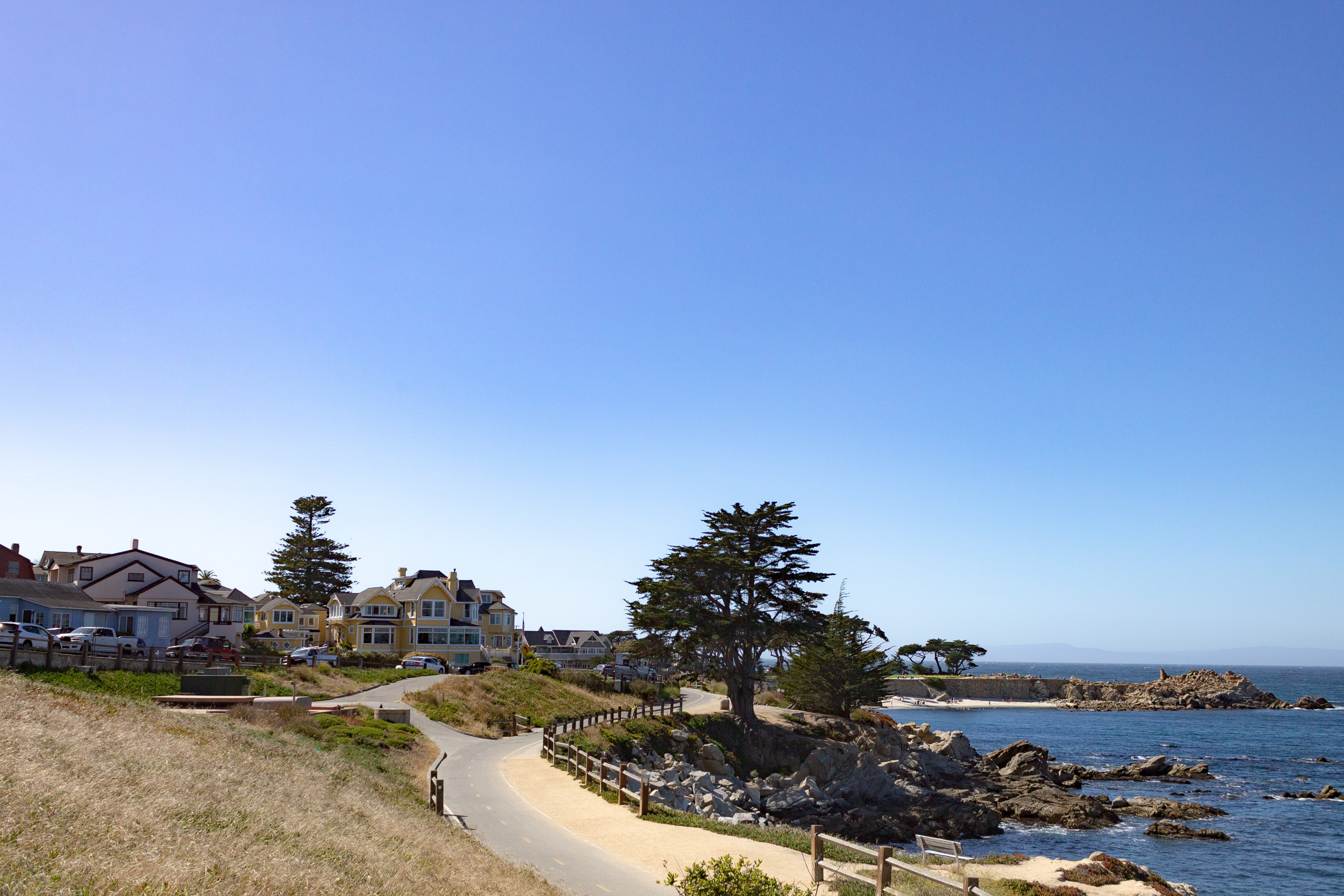
Reproduction of the same historical photograph 50 years later, June 2022, taken from the same physical location, showing the Monterey Bay Coastal Trail where the old railroad bed is.

== Activities ==
The trail supports a range of activities. The trail itself supports walking, jogging, and biking. The trail also connects to multiple beaches, and passes many local restaurants and businesses. There are also grassy areas and tables for picnics at various points along the trail. Several businesses along the trail offer bicycle, kayak, surfboard, scuba, and paddle rentals. There are plentiful scenic views of the Monterey Bay and ample opportunities for wildlife viewing.
