= Del Monte (train) =

Former Southern Pacific passenger train

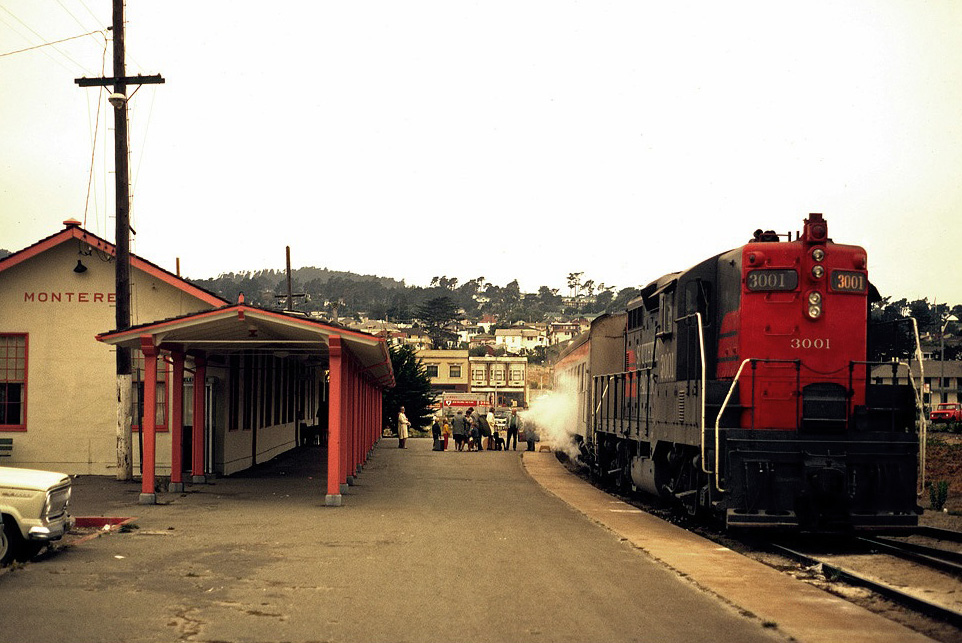
- The Del Monte at Monterey in 1970

Overview
- Status: Discontinued
- Locale: California
- First service: 1889
- Last service: April 30, 1971
- Former operator(s): Southern Pacific Railroad

Route
- Termini: San Francisco, California; Monterey, California
- Train number(s): 12/13

Technical
- Track gauge: 4 ft 8 1/2 in (1,435 mm) standard gauge

The Del Monte was a passenger train operated by the Southern Pacific Railroad between San Francisco and Monterey, California. It ran from 1889 to 1971.

== History ==
=== 19th century ===
Southern Pacific asserts that the named Del Monte service began in 1889, first appearing on a timetable as the Del Monte Limited. It replaced an apparently unnamed service (maybe known colloquially as The Daisy) which had operated on a similar schedule when Southern Pacific opened their Hotel Del Monte in 1880. The 1889 schedule showed train number 13 leaving San Francisco at 2:30 PM and reaching Monterey at 5:30. The return trip train number 12 left Monterey at 8 AM to reach San Francisco at 11:15.

=== 20th century ===
Early records of Del Monte service may have been lost in the 1906 San Francisco fire.

Trains were rerouted to the Bayshore Cutoff some time after its completion in 1907.

A sleeping car operated briefly over the 125-mile (201 km) route beginning in 1926.

After World War II a P-6 class 4-6-2 pulled a mail car, three or four coaches, a news-agent coach serving light snacks, and a parlor car. The parlor car was named Oliver Millet in 1947 when Millet retired after working 32 years as the Del Monte parlor car attendant. He was the only Southern Pacific employee recognized by a car name. Train number 78 left San Francisco daily at 4 PM, stopped at San Jose an hour later, and arrived in Monterey to unload mail at 7 PM. The locomotive and cars waited overnight at the Pacific Grove terminal to return as train number 77 leaving Monterey at 7:30 AM and reaching San Francisco at 10:30.

In 1948, the Del Monte Express fatally struck Ed Ricketts, a friend of John Steinbeck, while he was driving across the railroad tracks at Drake Avenue in Monterey.

In 1957, Southern Pacific successfully petitioned the state to discontinue passenger service to Pacific Grove. By 1961, operations were consolidated with the Peninsula Commute, with cars added north of San Jose.

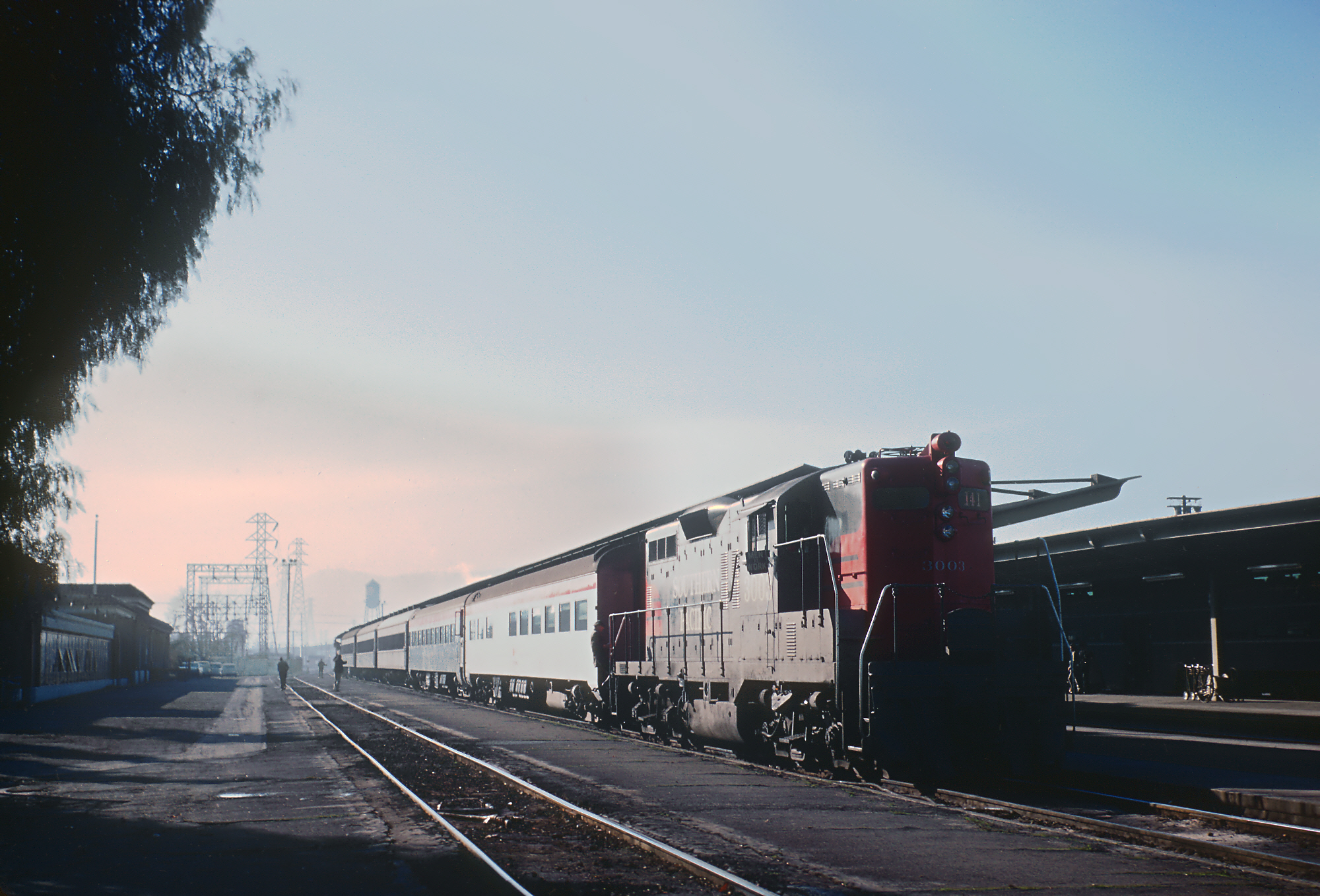
SP train 141 at San Jose, CA, in January 1968

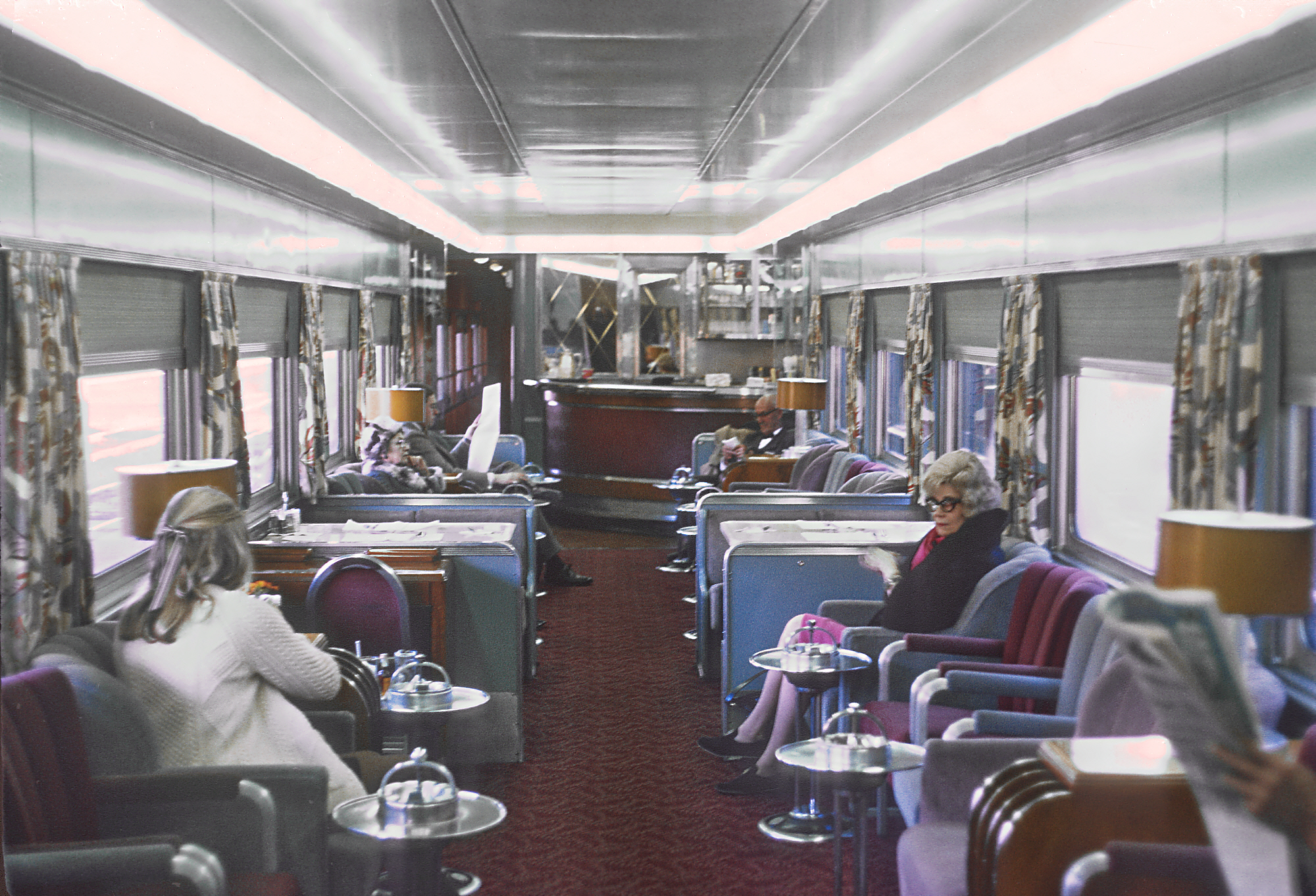
Interior of SP parlor car on Train 126, 1971

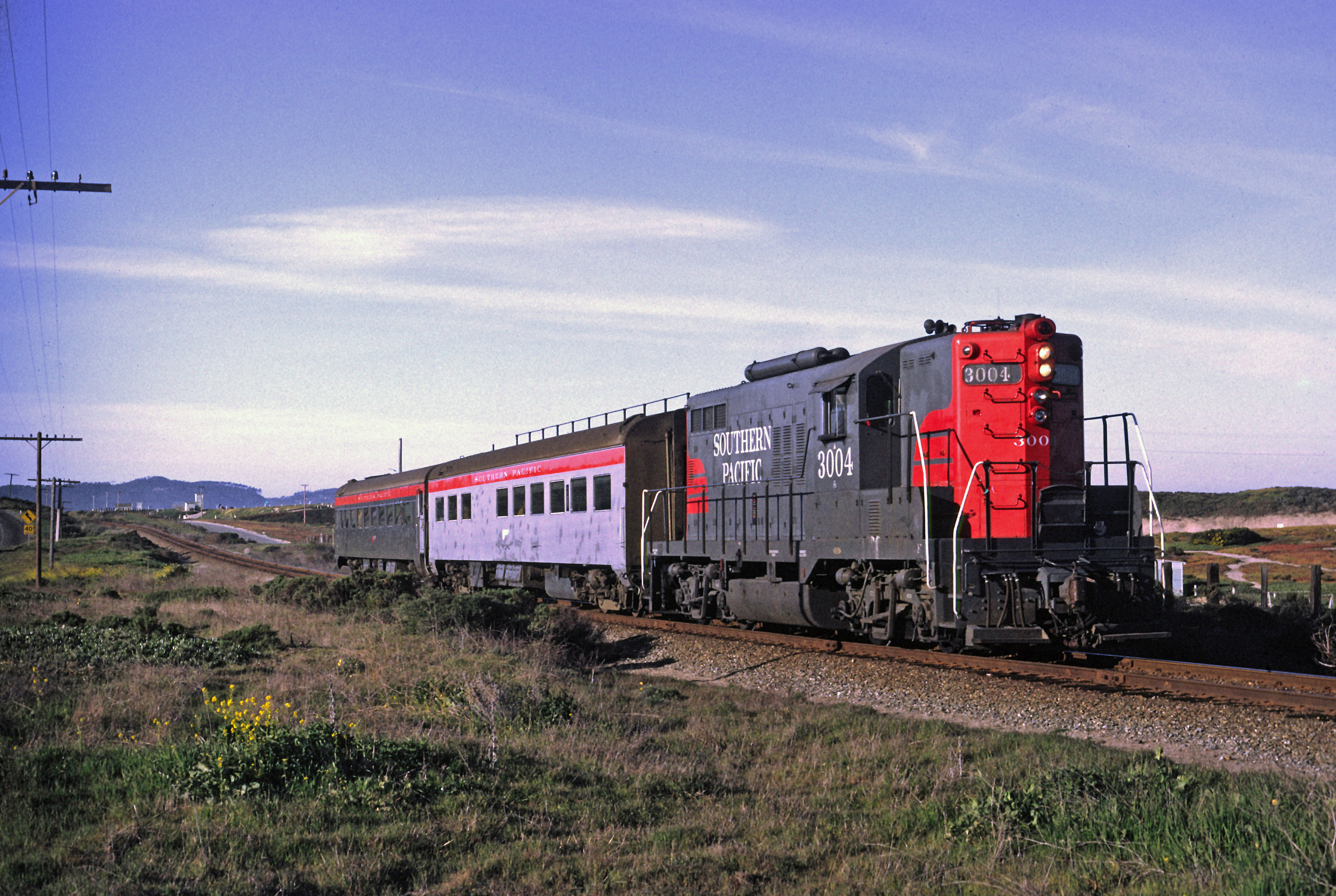
Del Monte at Castroville, 1971

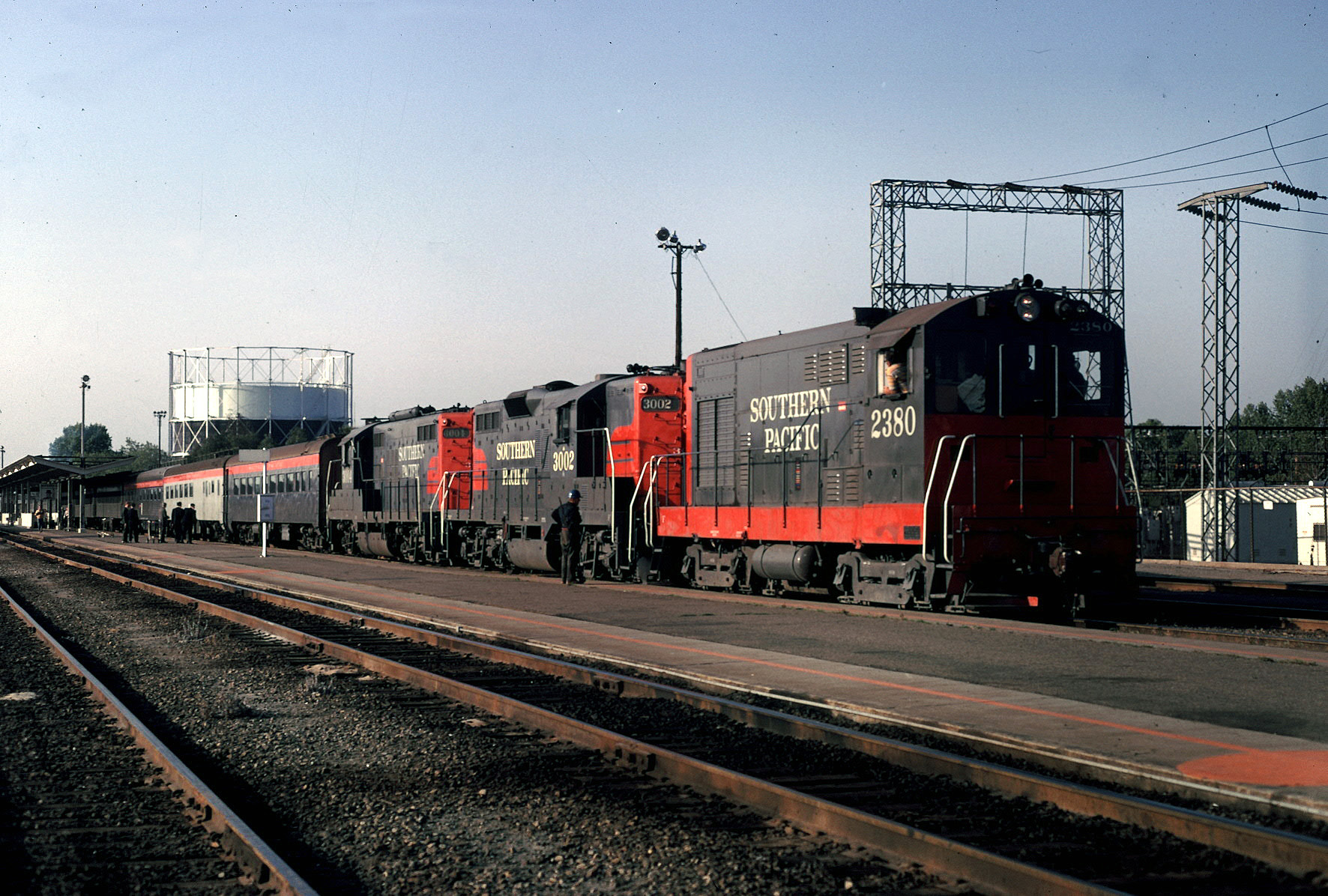
The Del Monte in 1971, just before it was discontinued

=== Cancellation ===
The Del Monte ran until April 30, 1971. When Amtrak took over intercity passenger train service the next day, the Del Monte was not included. The tracks in Pacific Grove and Monterey were removed in the 1980s and the former right-of-way is now the Monterey Bay Recreation Trail.

== Partial restoration ==
Since the train's demise, various groups have tried to reestablish rail service to the Monterey Bay area. Potential restoration of Del Monte-like service to Monterey had been identified as early as the Caltrans 1984-89 Rail passenger development plan. Amtrak declined to operate such service, but operations under Southern Pacific (by then running state-subsidized services) were studied with ridership forecast developed.

Caltrain (successor to the Peninsula Commute) extended service south of San Jose in 1992; two round trip trains operate south of Tamien at peak hours. Caltrans ran a demonstration passenger train over the line in 1995 to build support for restarting rail service. Service south of Gilroy is planned to start in 2021 following the Del Monte alignment until Castroville, whereupon trains will divert from the original routing and terminate at Salinas Intermodal Transportation Center on the Coast Line.

As of 2018 the Monterey Branch Line, the remaining segment from Castroville to Monterey, is being studied for a potential light rail service.
