= Castroville station =

Future train station in California

Castroville

General information
- Location: Castroville, California
- Coordinates: 36.7612°N 121.7451°W
- Line: UP Coast Subdivision

Other information
- Status: In planning

Future services
Preceding station	Amtrak	Following station
Pajaro/Watsonville toward Auburn	Capitol Corridor	Salinas Terminus
Coast Starlight does not stop here
Preceding station	Caltrain	Following station
Pajaro/Watsonville toward San Jose Diridon	South County Connector	Salinas Terminus
Former services
Preceding station	Southern Pacific Railroad	Following station
Elkhorn toward San Francisco	Coast Line	Cooper toward Los Angeles
Location

Castroville station (officially the Castroville Multimodal Station) is a future train station in Castroville, California. It is planned to serve both Caltrain and Amtrak California's Capitol Corridor trains as part of the Monterey County Rail Extension. The station will be located along Del Monte Avenue between Blackie Road and Wood Street. It is expected to open after track improvements in the area and commencement of service to Salinas.
