= Salinas Intermodal Transportation Center =

Train and bus stop in Central California

Salinas, CA
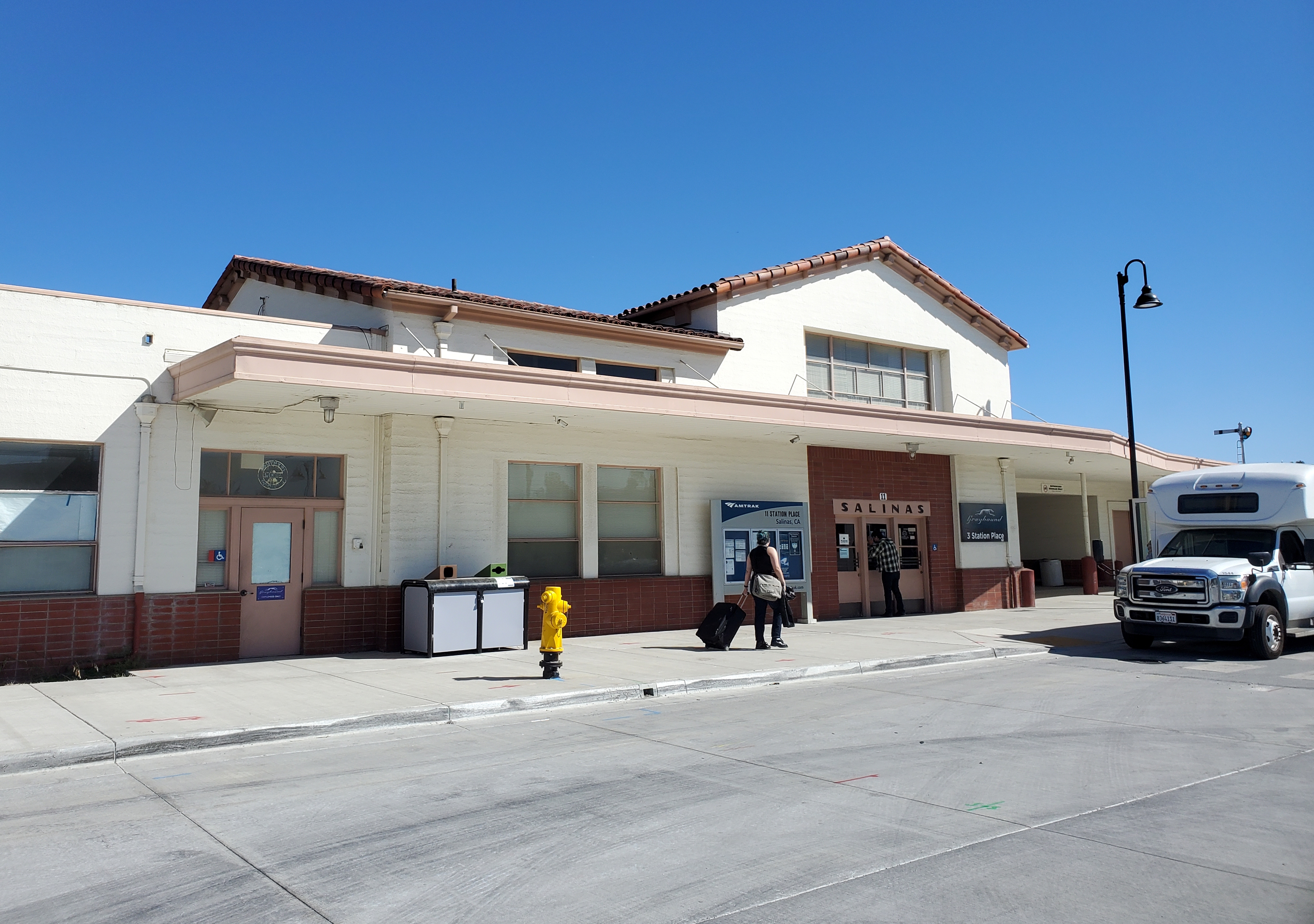
- Salinas Intermodal Transportation Center in October 2021

General information
- Location: 11 Station Place; Salinas, California; United States
- Coordinates: 36.6792°N 121.6567°W
- Owner: City of Salinas
- Line: UP Coast Subdivision
- Platforms: 1 side platform
- Tracks: 1
- Connections: Amtrak Thruway: 17, 21, Salinas-Carmel; Monterey–Salinas Transit: 59

Construction
- Parking: Yes
- Accessible: Yes

Other information
- Status: Staffed, station building with waiting room
- Station code: Amtrak: SNS

History
- Opened: September 9, 1872
- Rebuilt: 1905; June 10, 1941–January 11, 1942

Passengers
- FY 2025: 20,833 (Amtrak)

Services
Preceding station	Amtrak	Following station
San Jose toward Seattle	Coast Starlight	Paso Robles toward Los Angeles
Future services
Preceding station	Caltrain	Following station
Castroville toward San Jose Diridon	South County Connector	Terminus
Preceding station	Amtrak	Following station
Castroville toward Auburn	Capitol Corridor	Terminus
Pajaro/Watsonville toward Seattle	Coast Starlight	King City toward Los Angeles
Former services
Preceding station	Amtrak	Following station
San Jose toward Sacramento	Spirit of California	San Luis Obispo toward Los Angeles
Preceding station	Southern Pacific Railroad	Following station
Castroville toward San Francisco	Coast Line	Chualar toward Los Angeles
Location

Salinas Intermodal Transportation Center is an intermodal transit center in downtown Salinas, California, United States. As a transit hub, the facility is a passenger rail station and bus station.

== Services ==
The station is a stop on the Coast Starlight from Los Angeles to Seattle, Washington.

Greyhound Lines moved its Salinas station to the property in 2015 but no longer serves the city as of 2026.

After years of delays, the Transportation Agency for Monterey County's planned Monterey County Rail Extension would see expanded Caltrain commuter rail service from the station to the San Francisco Bay Area by 2028, with long-term plans to extend Amtrak California's Capitol Corridor as well.

The station grounds were remodeled in 2021 to prepare for increased services; traffic circulation was improved by extending Lincoln Avenue to the station. Monterey–Salinas Transit local bus service will move from the Salinas Transit Center a few blocks away to the expanded station.

As of 2024, Amtrak plans to modify the platform for accessibility by FY 2025.

== Design ==
The depot, constructed in 1941 by the Southern Pacific Railroad, exhibits a pared down Spanish Revival style as influenced by the then-popular Art Deco movement. Spanish Revival elements include the red tile roof and stuccoed walls, while the Art Deco influence is visible in the rectilinear composition and clean lines.

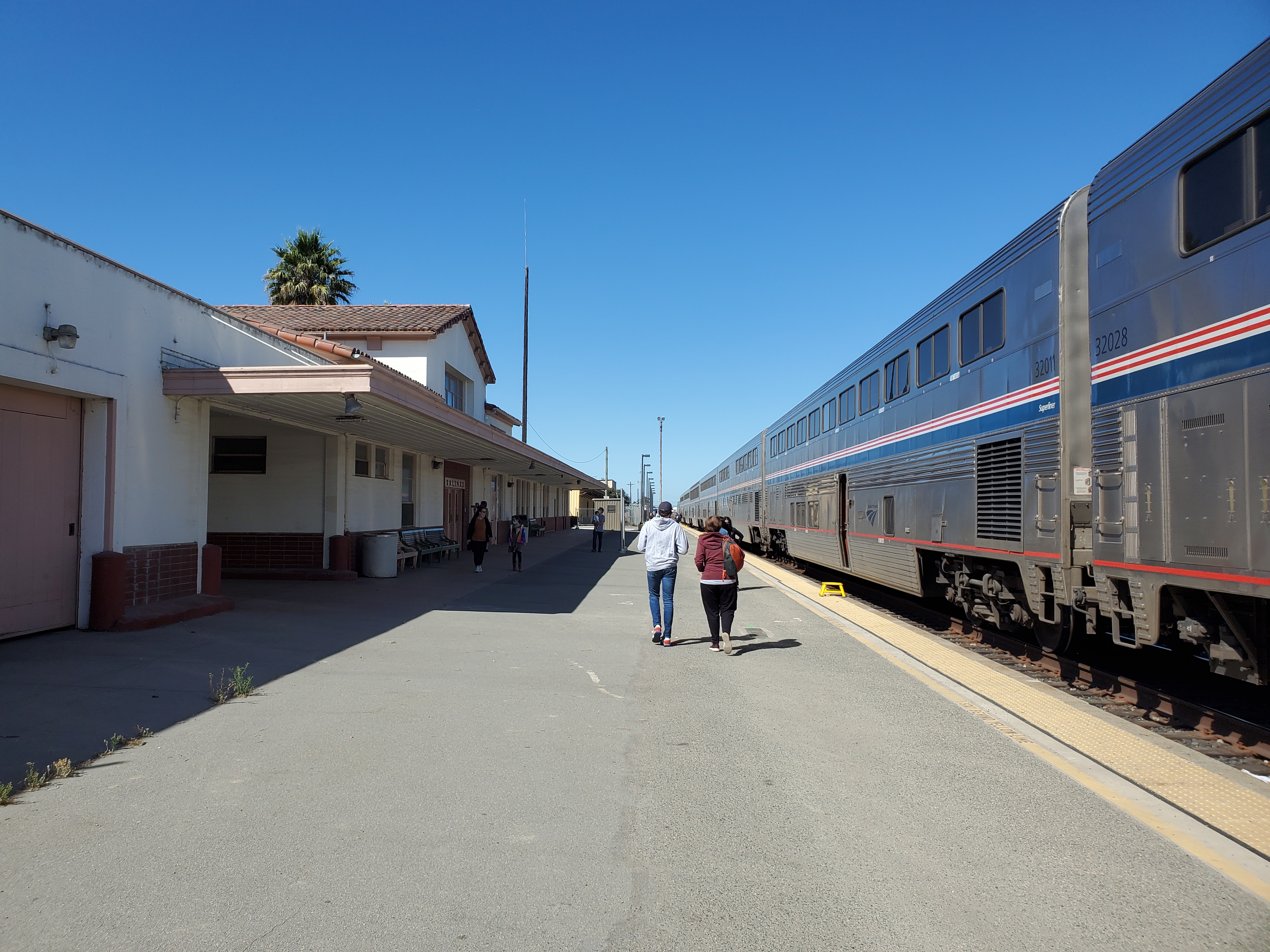
The Coast Starlight at Salinas

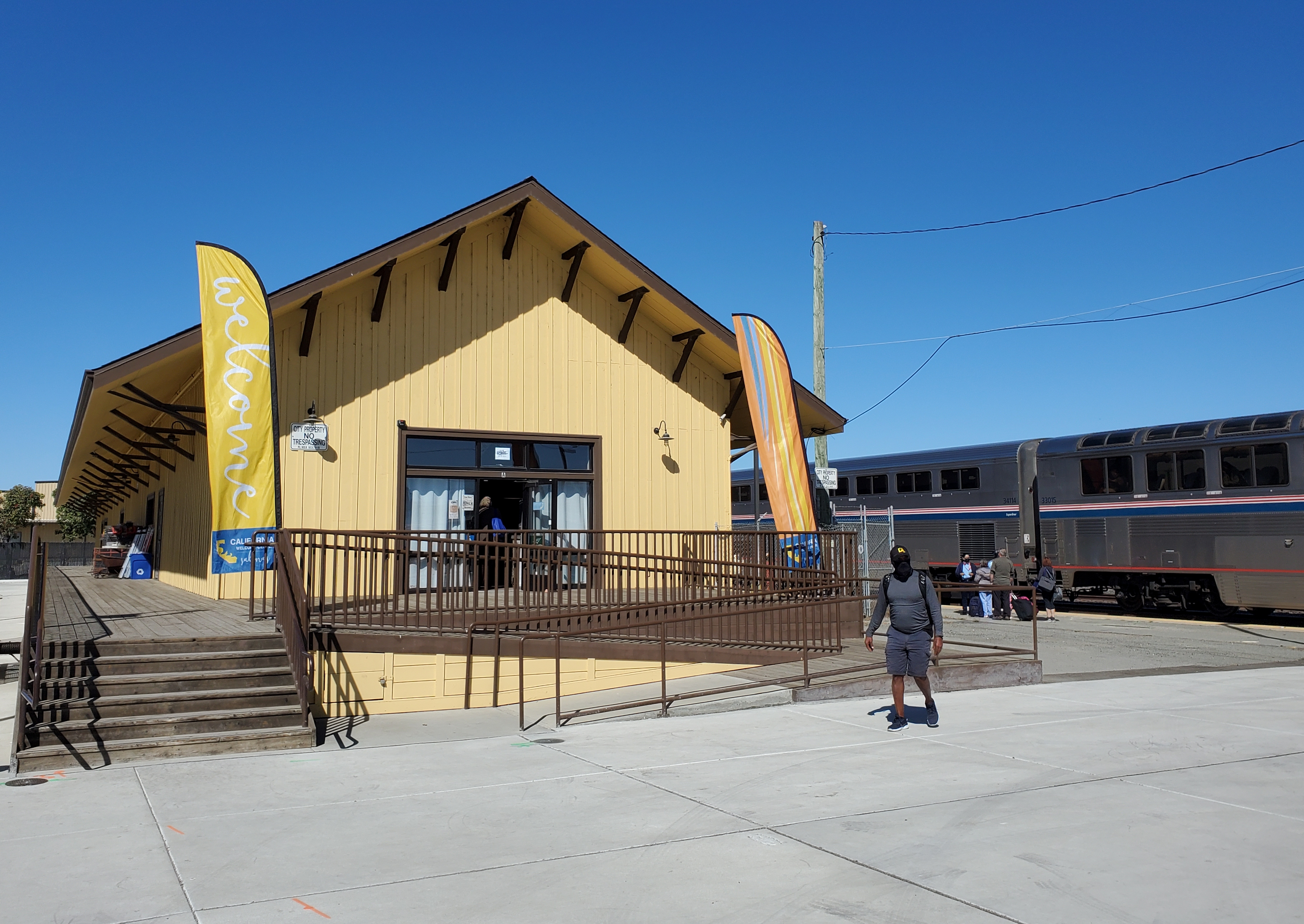
The 1880s-built freight house, now a welcome center

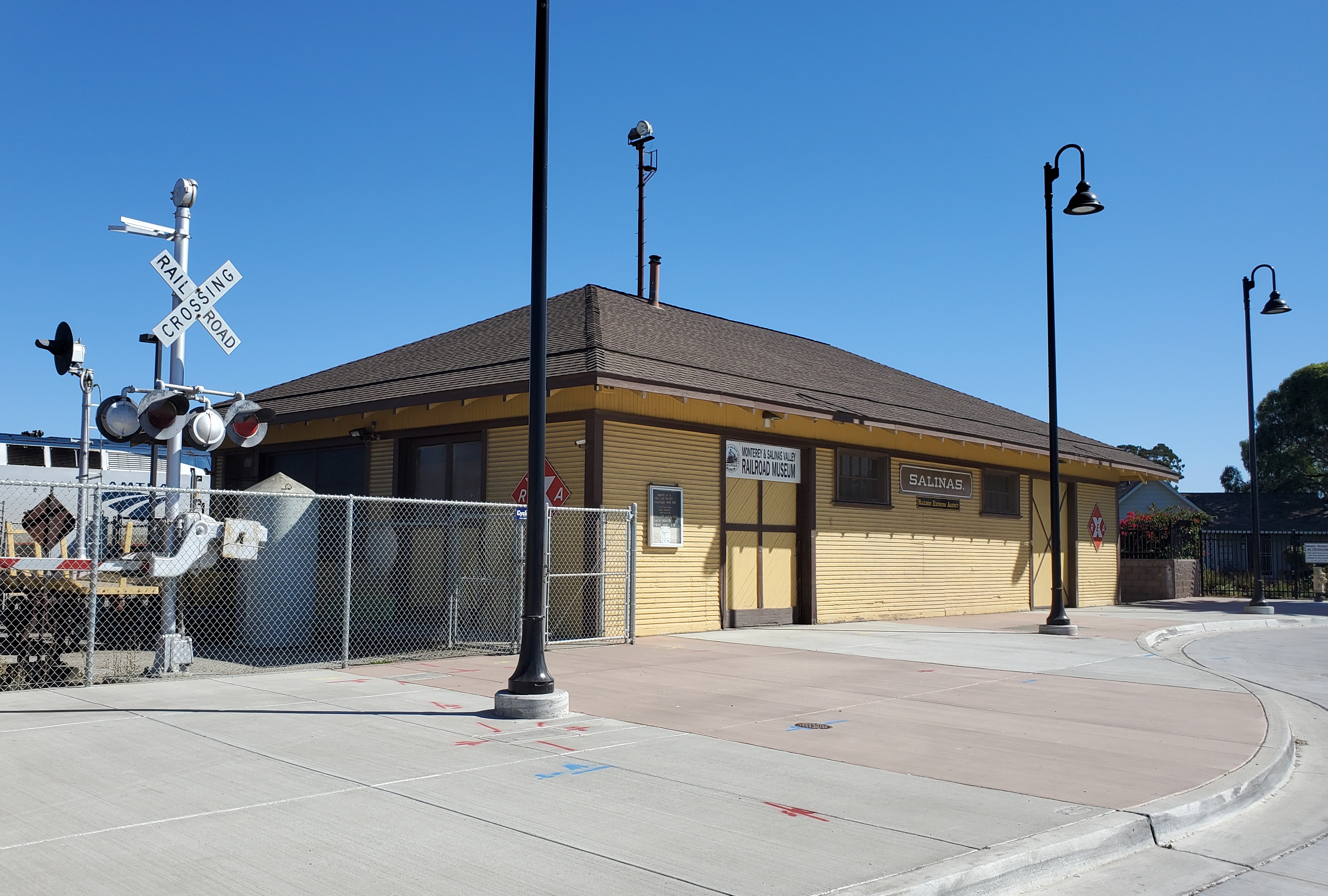
The former Railway Express Agency building, now the Monterey and Salinas Valley Railroad Museum
