= Pajaro, California =

- Unincorporated community Census designated place
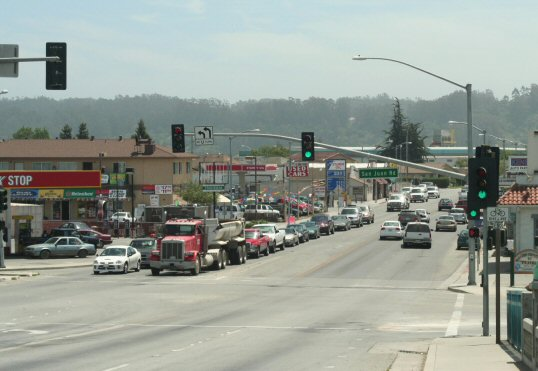
- Pajaro, viewed from the bridge across the Pajaro River

- Location in Monterey County and the state of California

- Location in California Location in the United States
- Coordinates: 36°54′15″N 121°44′55″W
- Country: United States
- State: California
- County: Monterey

Government
  - State senator: John Laird (D)
  - Assemblymember: Robert Rivas (D)
  - U. S. rep.: Jimmy Panetta (D)

Area
  - Total: 0.929 sq mi (2.41 km^{2})
  - Land: 0.929 sq mi (2.41 km^{2})
  - Water: 0 sq mi (0 km^{2})
- Elevation: 26 ft (8 m)

Population (2020)
  - Total: 2,882
  - Density: 3,100/sq mi (1,200/km^{2})
- Time zone: UTC-8 (Pacific)
  - Summer (DST): UTC-7 (PDT)
- ZIP code: 95076
- Area code: 831
- FIPS code: 06-55044
- GNIS feature IDs: 1659773

Pajaro (Spanish Pájaro 'bird') is an unincorporated community in Monterey County, California, United States. It is located on the south bank of the Pajaro River 5 miles (8 km) northeast of its mouth, at an elevation of 26 feet (7.9 m). For statistical purposes, the United States Census Bureau has defined that community as a census-designated place (CDP). The population was 2,882 at the 2020 census, down from 3,070 in 2010. The school district is in Santa Cruz County.

== History ==
The Pajaro post office operated from 1872 to 1873 and from 1882 to 1888.

The Porter–Vallejo Mansion was constructed in the 1840s. As the oldest building in the community, it has been remodeled multiple times. It was acquired in 1991 and converted into a public library/senior citizen center. It also houses a day-care facility for the children of migrant farm workers.

The town was heavily flooded in 1995, 1998, and 2023.

== Geography ==
Pajaro lies in the Pajaro Valley, with the Pajaro River forming the community's and the county's northern boundary. The city of Watsonville is across the river to the northwest, Santa Cruz County.

According to the United States Census Bureau, the Pajaro CDP has a total area of 0.9 square miles (2.3 km^{2}), all land.

== Demographics ==
=== 2020 census ===
As of the 2020 census, Pajaro had a population of 2,882 and a population density of 3,109.0 inhabitants per square mile (1,200.4/km^{2}).

The age distribution was 34.5% under the age of 18, 11.4% aged 18 to 24, 30.0% aged 25 to 44, 18.1% aged 45 to 64, and 6.0% who were 65 years of age or older. The median age was 27.9 years. For every 100 females, there were 111.4 males, and for every 100 females age 18 and over there were 110.5 males.

The census reported that 98.9% of the population lived in households, 1.1% lived in non-institutionalized group quarters, and no one was institutionalized. 98.9% of residents lived in urban areas, while 1.1% lived in rural areas.

There were 649 households, out of which 66.4% included children under the age of 18, 57.8% were married-couple households, 7.1% were cohabiting couple households, 22.5% had a female householder with no partner present, and 12.6% had a male householder with no partner present. 8.8% of households were one person, and 3.5% were one person aged 65 or older. The average household size was 4.39. There were 560 families (86.3% of all households).

There were 652 housing units at an average density of 703.3 units per square mile (271.5 units/km^{2}), of which 649 (99.5%) were occupied. Of these, 15.9% were owner-occupied, and 84.1% were occupied by renters. 0.5% of housing units were vacant; the homeowner vacancy rate was 0.0% and the rental vacancy rate was 0.2%.

Racial composition as of the 2020 census
Race	Number	Percent
White	340	11.8%
Black or African American	5	0.2%
American Indian and Alaska Native	86	3.0%
Asian	48	1.7%
Native Hawaiian and Other Pacific Islander	1	0.0%
Some other race	1,924	66.8%
Two or more races	478	16.6%
Hispanic or Latino (of any race)	2,744	95.2%

=== Income and poverty ===
In 2023, the US Census Bureau estimated that the median household income was $82,083, and the per capita income was $21,016. About 7.6% of families and 14.7% of the population were below the poverty line.

=== 2010 census ===
The 2010 United States census reported that Pajaro had a population of 3,070. The population density was 3,312.2 inhabitants per square mile (1,278.8/km^{2}). The racial makeup of Pajaro was 1,451 (47.3%) White, 15 (0.5%) African American, 78 (2.5%) Native American, 53 (1.7%) Asian, 0 (0.0%) Pacific Islander, 1,281 (41.7%) from other races, and 192 (6.3%) from two or more races. Hispanic or Latino of any race were 2,889 persons (94.1%)

The Census reported that 2,979 people (97.0% of the population) lived in households, 91 (3.0%) lived in non-institutionalized group quarters, and 0 (0%) were institutionalized.

There were 621 households, out of which 444 (71.5%) had children under the age of 18 living in them, 409 (65.9%) were opposite-sex married couples living together, 86 (13.8%) had a female householder with no husband present, 57 (9.2%) had a male householder with no wife present. There were 41 (6.6%) unmarried opposite-sex partnerships, and 3 (0.5%) same-sex married couples or partnerships. 46 households (7.4%) were made up of individuals, and 19 (3.1%) had someone living alone who was 65 years of age or older. The average household size was 4.80. There were 552 families (88.9% of all households); the average family size was 4.82.

The population was spread out, with 1,067 people (34.8%) under the age of 18, 432 people (14.1%) aged 18 to 24, 970 people (31.6%) aged 25 to 44, 471 people (15.3%) aged 45 to 64, and 130 people (4.2%) who were 65 years of age or older. The median age was 25.6 years. For every 100 females, there were 124.1 males. For every 100 females age 18 and over, there were 134.3 males.

There were 655 housing units at an average density of 706.7 per square mile (272.9/km^{2}), of which 141 (22.7%) were owner-occupied, and 480 (77.3%) were occupied by renters. The homeowner vacancy rate was 1.4%; the rental vacancy rate was 3.2%. 620 people (20.2% of the population) lived in owner-occupied housing units and 2,359 people (76.8%) lived in rental housing units.

== Infrastructure ==
=== Transportation ===
A proposed Pajaro/Watsonville station is expected to be built at Watsonville Junction for Caltrain and Amtrak's Capitol Corridor.

=== Utilities ===
Some public services in the Community of Pajaro are provided by the Pajaro-Sunny Mesa Community Services District (PSMCSD) which was organized by Monterey County Board of Supervisors in 1984. PSMCSD, a non-profit, governmental agency, provides public water services, public sewer services, park services, and street lighting services to the community. PSMCSD has also significantly expanded its service areas to provide water services to the Prunedale, Elkhorn, and Moss Landing communities of North Monterey County. Between 1984 and 1990, a federal grant funds re-constructed and expanded major portions of the Pajaro County Sanitation District sewer system. This remedied multiple public health problems and extended services to the Bay Farms, Fruitland, and Las Lomas neighborhoods.
