= Playland (Fresno) =

Theme park in California

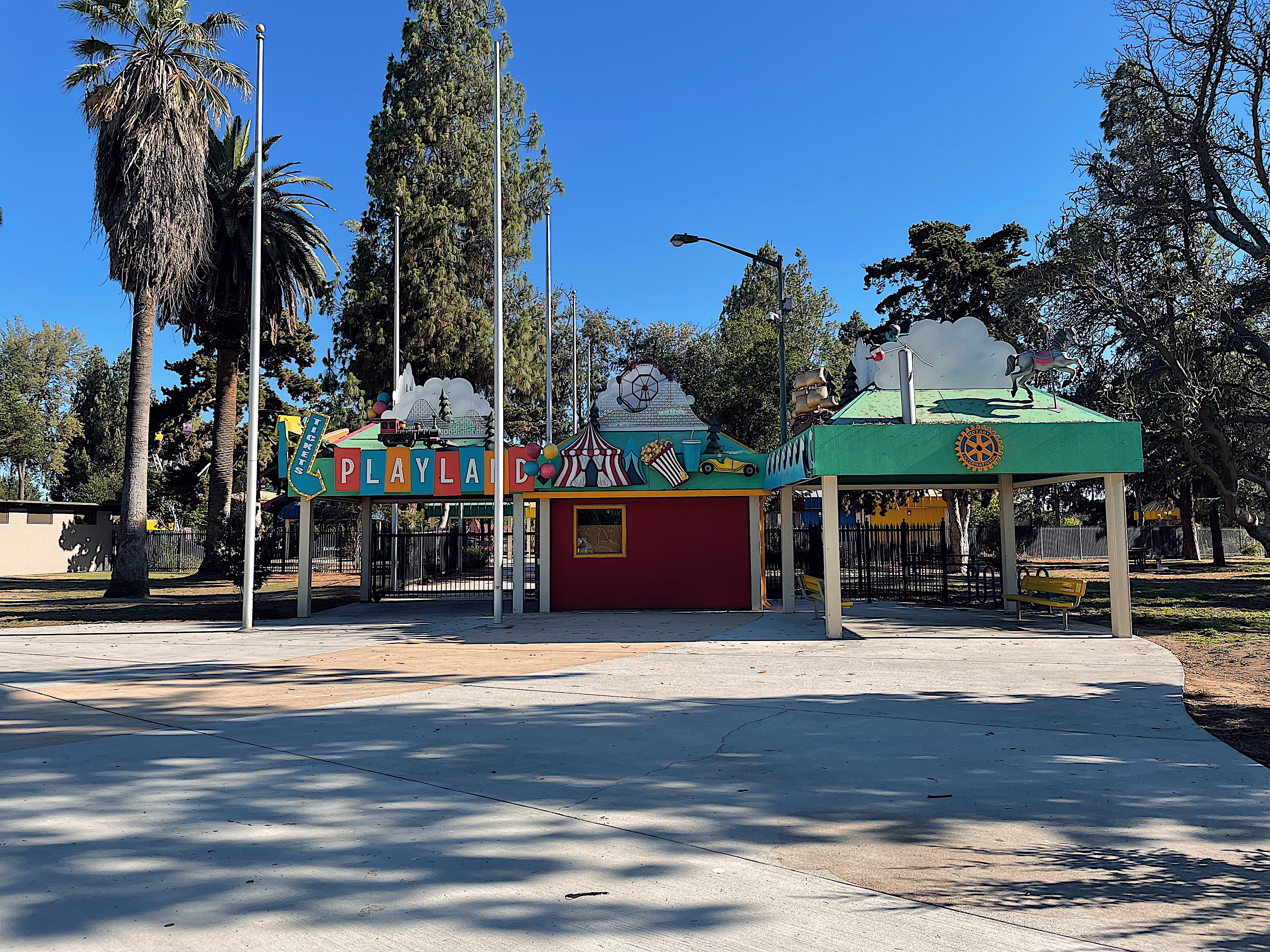
- The entrance and ticket booth for Playland in 2022
- Location: 890 W. Belmont Avenue, Fresno, CA, United States
- Coordinates: 36.751689°N 119.823531°W
- Opened: 1955; 70 years ago
- Closed: 2025; 0 years ago
- Owner: Fresno Rotary Clubs
- Operated by: Playland and Storyland Board
- Theme: Carnival and Circus
- Operating season: Year-round

Playland was an amusement park in Roeding Park in Fresno, California. It was built in 1955, and it shared the space on the southwest corner of the park with Storyland, its sister park, and Fresno Chaffee Zoo. For most of its history, Playland and Storyland competed with the Zoo for guests, but after years of poor turnout, and the rise of prominence of the Chaffee Zoo, in 2015, Playland and Storyland underwent a massive overhaul and repair project, and the owner of Playland and Storyland, the Fresno Rotary Clubs, decided to collaborate with the nonprofit 501(c)(3) organization that runs the Chaffee Zoo to offer discounts to encourage guests to visit all three parks.

Despite the efforts of the owners, Playland closed its doors for the final time on March 23, 2025.

== History ==
=== Opening and Competition ===
Playland was opened in 1955, six weeks before Disneyland in Anaheim. Local Rotary Clubs, acting upon a proposal by Dr. Joe Logan, then-president of the North Fresno Rotary, teamed up to raise money and build the park. That first day, 14,000 ride tickets were sold, at 10 cents each, and the construction debt was repaid within three years. Playland was much smaller in scope and size than Disneyland, however, and because it offered a cheaper alternative, it was capable of drawing in above 250,000 guests in its debut season.

Playland was built on the southwest corner of Roeding Park, bordered to the west by California State Route 99. At the time, Fresno Chaffee Zoo was small but popular, and building an amusement park was seen as a good way to capitalize on the zoo's popularity and contribute to the city's culture and raise funds for public projects. At the time of opening, Playland offered a merry-go-round, small roller coaster, and a miniature diesel train that travelled around Lake Washington, an artificial pond in which guests could swim in. Seven years later, Storyland was built on the other side of Lake Washington, and the diesel train system was connected with a second station, so passengers could travel between the parks freely.

Because the park was owned and operated by the various Fresno Rotary Clubs, profits from the amusement park were planted back into the community by the Rotary Playland board of directors. It was Playland money that, in 1964, bought 50 acres of extra land to help form Woodward Park. More cash went toward the Zoo's reptile house, a new exhibit for Nosey the elephant (the zoo's first elephant who had previously been held in a concrete and steel cage), land for Logan Park, and the Shinzen Friendship Garden.

Playland and Storyland had little room to grow, because they were on the outer edge of Roeding Park. The zoo, however, had plenty of room to grow. This rivalry between Playland and the Zoo grew, forging an intimate business connection between the Rotary Clubs who operated Playland and Storyland. They formed the Playland and Storyland Board in order to better coordinate the two parks' interests.

After decades of growth by the Zoo, it soon eclipsed Playland and Storyland in attendance, and the parks became unprofitable. Fresno Rotary kept the parks running as a part of Fresno history to be maintained and operated at a cost.

=== Renovation and Re-Opening ===
After years of decline, Playland and Storyland did not open for its 2015 season. It was announced by Daniel Leith, a Playland and Storyland board member, who stated that they would remain closed until they had gathered enough funds to repair tree-damaged sidewalks and irrigation systems, to improve landscape, attractions and bathrooms, and cover operations costs at a time when attendance was lagging. At the time, officials of the nonprofit that runs Fresno Chaffee Zoo, the Fresno Chaffee Zoo Corp., confirmed that they were in talks to possibly acquire both Playland and Storyland. However, while the Zoo was under renovation and expansion through funds from Measure Z, the corporation would not have been allowed to use any of those funds to assist the neighboring parks.

When The Fresno Bee reported on Playland's closure for the 2015 season, and its mounting problems with funding, the news organization was inundated with a flood of local support throughout the year. On July 6, a letter to the editor by Cathy Caples was published that suggested that local residents turning 60 years old donate $60 to the Save Storyland campaign, as it was also Playland's 60th birthday. It was also suggested that the County of Fresno institute a "Storyland/Playland tax", a sales tax meant to send funds directly to the park itself. An editorial published in the Fresno Bee in 2015 recounted the history of both Playland and Storyland and asked for local donations.

In September 2015, Elaine Robles-McGraw, Storyland's volunteer operational director, announced that Storyland and Playland had received enough funding to reopen for the 2016 season. The Playland and Storyland Board also announced that they would also now be working alongside the Fresno Chaffee Zoo in cross promotions, such as offering discounts and planning special event days around Halloween and Christmas to mirror zoo's schedule.

=== COVID-19 Pandemic ===
In March 2020, in response to the COVID-19 pandemic, Playland, Storyland, and the Fresno Chaffee Zoo shut down. On June 22, the zoo reopened, but per Governor Gavin Newsom's executive order on July 13, 2020, the zoo is only open for outdoor recreation, and all indoor facilities remained closed. The park later reopened in 2023.

== Operations ==
=== Closures ===
Playland has had three season closures though its operation:

- In 2015, after almost 60 years of operation, the park was closed pending funding for renovations. The money was quickly raised through local and government support, and the park re-opened for the 2016 season.
- In 2020 and 2021, in response to the COVID-19 pandemic.
- In 2025, it was announced that Playland would close for good due to financial issues and declining attendance. The initial date of closure was March 30, but the actual closure occurred one week earlier, on March 23.

== See also ==
- Fresno Chaffee Zoo
