= Market Street station =

Market Street station could refer to:

- Market Street Station (Denver), a former bus transport hub in Denver, Colorado
- Market Street Depot, a former station in San Jose, California
- 8th–Market station, a subway station in Philadelphia, Pennsylvania
- Union Square/Market Street station, a subway station in San Francisco, California
