= San Jose Railroads =

Former streetcar system in California

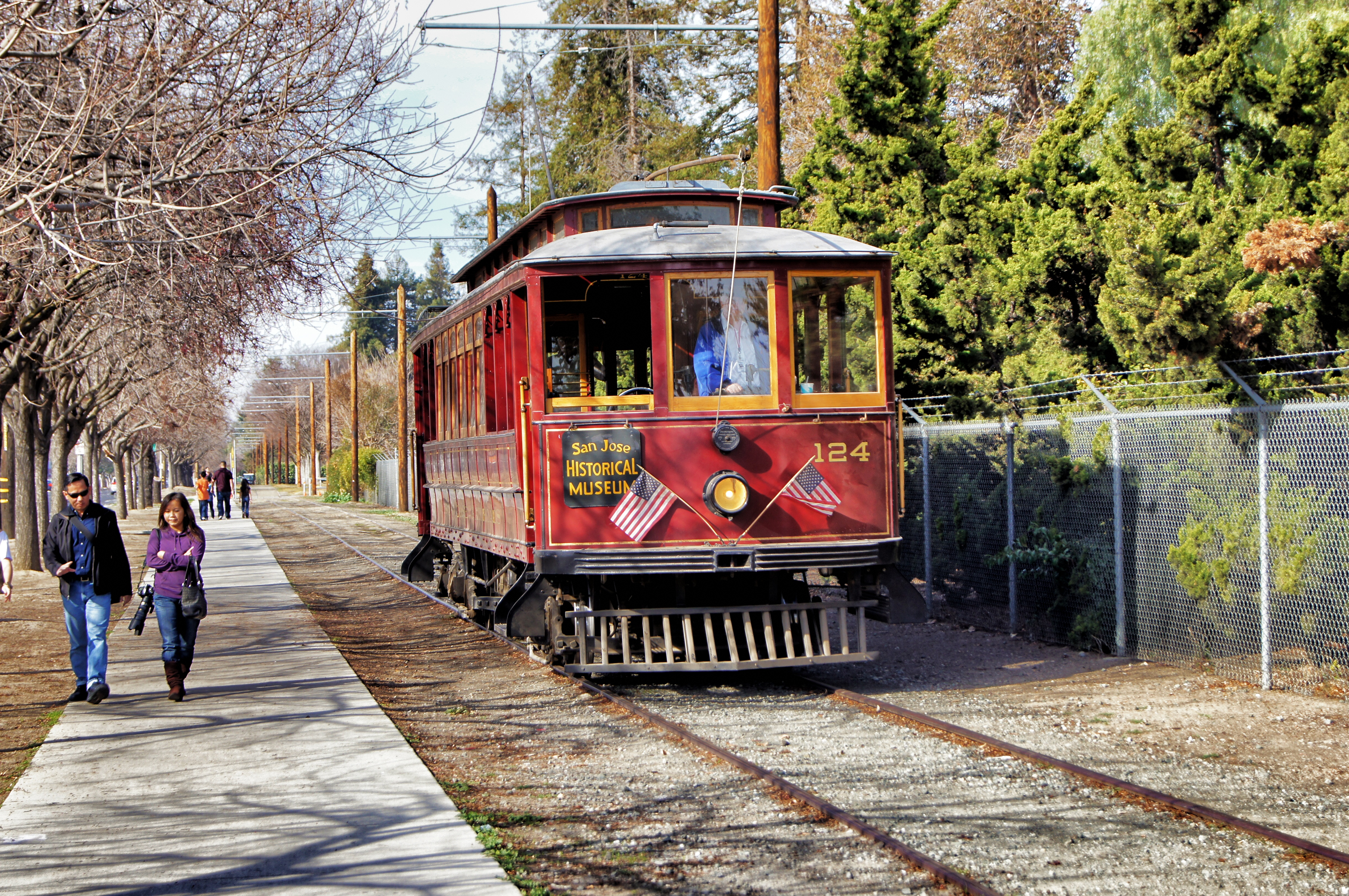
- San Jose Railroads car 124 at San Jose History Park. It was operated by San Jose Railroads from 1912 to 1934

Overview
- Headquarters: San Jose, California
- Dates of operation: 1894–1938
- Predecessor: People's Horse Railway Co. (1879-1894), San Jose Railroad Co. (1894-1912)
- Successor: Santa Clara Valley Transportation Authority

Technical
- Track gauge: 4 ft 8 1/2 in (1,435 mm) standard gauge
- Electrification: Overhead line, 600 V DC

The San Jose Railroads was a street railway operator in San Jose, from 1912 until April 10, 1938

== History ==
=== People's Horse Railway Company (1879–1894) ===
The San Jose Railroads has its origins in the founding of the People's Horse Railway Company in 1879 "to acquire control of several horse railroads". It subsequently acquired the First Street Railroad, Market Street and Willow Glen Railroad, and North Side Horse Railroad Company in 1881, 1882, and 1882 respectively. The only other street railway to operate in San Jose during this time was the South East Side Horse Railroad Co. which opened in 1877 and was merged the same year into the North Side Horse Railroad Co. This formed a duopoly with the rival San Jose and Santa Clara County Railway which was the original operator of horsecar service in San Jose dating back to 1868. The San Jose Railroad Company mainly operated routes branching off of first street, while the San Jose and Santa Clara County Railroad mainly operated routes branching off of Santa Clara street.

=== San Jose Railroad Company (1894–1912) ===
In 1894, the People's Horse Railway Co. changed its name to the San Jose Railroad Company. A third street railway, the Alum Rock Railway Company, also operated service to Alum Rock Park from 1896 until 1905 when it was taken over by the San Jose and Santa Clara County Railway.

=== San Jose Railroads (1912–1938) ===
In 1912, the San Jose and Santa Clara County Railway was incorporated into the San Jose Railroad Company, forming the San Jose Railroads, a trolley monopoly, a few years after the San Jose Railroads was itself acquired by Southern Pacific This arrangement was sustained until electric trolley service in San Jose ended April 10, 1938.

== Routes ==
=== Electric trolleys ===
As a result of the 1906 San Francisco Earthquake, many original horsecar routes were damaged and rebuilt as electric trolleys on standard gauge tracks. A few lines, notably on Hobson street and Monterey Road south of Alma street, were never upgraded from narrow gauge tracks and were soon replaced by buses.

During the 1920s, San Jose was served by many electric trolley routes. On May 1, 1921, a major restructuring of trolley routes was implemented. This created routes 1 to 9, with lines 1-3 operating as a trunk on Santa Clara street with branches, 4 being a shuttle in Hanchett Park, 5 being a shuttle in Santa Clara, 6/7/9 operating on first street as a trunk with branches, and 8 operating on Delmas, San Fernando, and Julian streets. Local service within San Jose was also provided on the Bascome and Naglee lines of the Peninsular Railway. When the Peninsular Railway ended service in 1934, the Bascome local route and Naglee local route were transferred to San Jose Railroads.

=== Bus Lines ===
San Jose Railroads ran some bus services, mostly in its later years to substitute previously abandoned trolley service. In 1921, there were two such bus routes numbered 10 and 11, running on Hobson street and Monterey Road south of Alma street. In 1939 San Jose Railroads was merged into San Jose City Lines, a subsidiary of National City Lines. Notably, this was an whole year after the trolley routes stopped operating, so by then San Jose Railroads may have been exclusively operating bus service, assuming it gradually abandoned streetcar routes and converted them to buses.

== Operations ==
The San Jose Railroads operated out of two trolley divisions, the Alameda Carbarn at the northern side of Alameda and Julian streets, and the East Santa Clara Street Carbarn on the northeastern corner of Santa Clara street and 27th streets. Both carbarns had direct mainline rail access, and the San Jose Railroads Headquarters were in a building adjacent to the Alameda Carbarn.

== San Jose Railroads car 73, 124 & 143 ==
Streetcars number 73, 124, and 143 are the only known surviving San Jose Railroads streetcars. Number 73 is kept at the VTA Guadalupe division along with VTA light rail trains. It is brought out for a seasonal heritage service at the downtown transit mall, along with a few other streetcars operated by the California Trolley & Railroad Corporation. Streetcar number 124 is kept at the trolley barn in San Jose's History Park. It is often operated on weekends.

Birney car number 143 is also kept at the History San Jose trolley barn. However it was originally owned and operated by the Fresno Traction Company. It was recovered from a farm field near Fresno in the 1980s. After a four year restoration and reconstruction, it is now operational and also run on weekends.

== See also ==
- List of California street railroads
- VTA light rail
