= Roeding Park =

Park in Fresno, California

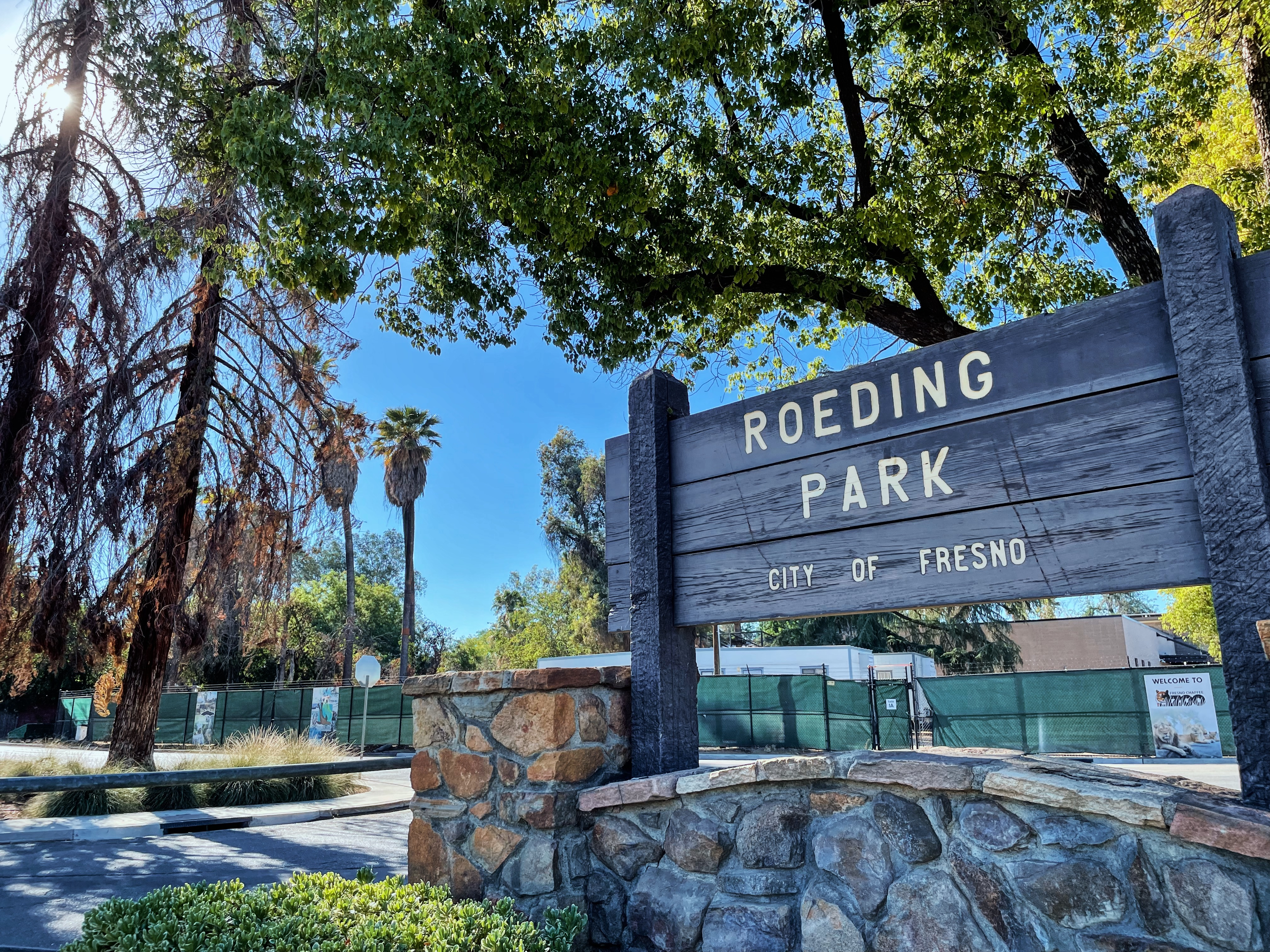
- Roeding Park Entrance Sign
- Interactive map of Roeding Park
- Type: Urban park
- Location: Fresno, California
- Coordinates: 36°45′12″N 119°49′22″W
- Area: 145.27 acres (58.79 ha)
- Created: 1903
- Operator: City of Fresno
- Status: Open all year
- Public transit: FAX: 33

Roeding Park is a 90-acre (360,000 m^{2}) regional city park in Fresno, California established in 1903 via a gift from the Roeding family.

The Fresno Chaffee Zoo occupies approximately one third of the acreage in the middle of the southern half of the park. The southwest corner includes Storyland, Playland and a lake between them. The rest of the park includes several ponds, groves of ash, cedar, pine, and eucalyptus, maple, and redwood trees as well as picnic areas, tennis courts and a Southern Pacific train engine. The park also has a Japanese War Memorial.

== History ==
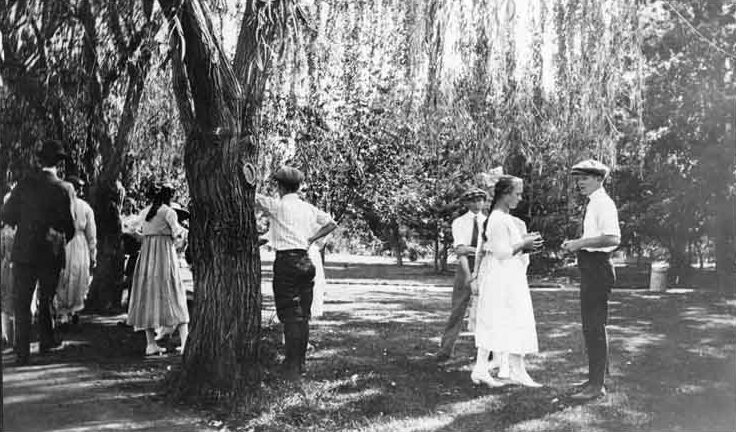
Park scene Roeding Park circa 1910

Roeding Park was a gift of Frederick and Marianne Roeding to the City of Fresno on May 2, 1903. The gift of 70 acres of land came with the stipulations that it be used for a public park and that the city spend $3,500 per year, for ten years, improving it. On April 7, 1908, the Roedings donated an additional 46 acres. Sixteen years later, on January 2, 1924, the City of Fresno purchased an additional 40 acres from the Roedings, bringing park's total size to 159 acres.

Landscape architect Johannes Reimers from Stockton, California, was retained to design the park, for the sum of $300. By the end of 1906, the park had been planted with trees and by 1910, a hard surface had been applied to the roads inside the park. The Fresno Traction Company constructed a Roeding Park branch line, completed in 1912, to transport visitors there by trolley.

A zoo component was added in the 1920s, and grew substantially over time. Members of Fresno's Rotary club raised funds to build Playland amusement park in 1955, and Storyland was added in 1962.

From 1954 to 1996, Roeding Park hosted the reconstructed in Fort Miller Blockhouse, which was the oldest structure in Fresno County, dating from 1851. It had been dismantled and moved from the Friant Dam area. While in Roeding Park, it was re-dedicated as the Fort Miller Blockhouse Museum where relics of early Fresno County history and other exhibits are contained in the building, which is listed on the local register of historic places.

In July 2009, Page & Turnbull inventoried and evaluated Roeding Park as a historic district as part of the Roeding Park and Fresno Chaffee Zoo Facility Master Plans Draft Environmental Impact Report. Accordingly, Roeding Park is identified as meeting National Register of Historic Places (NRHP) Criteria A and C and California Register of Historical Resources (CRHR) Criteria 1 and 3 in the areas of Entertainment/Recreation, Community Planning & Development, and Landscape Architecture. The district contains 25 contributing resources and the period of significance was 1903–1953. A qualified Architectural Historian meeting the Secretary of Interior Professional Qualification Standards conducted the 2009 Roeding Park survey.

== Features ==
=== Theme Parks ===
The park houses Playland, an amusement park operated by local area rotary clubs and Storyland, a theme park with a fairy tale theme. Storyland is geared toward younger children. The park has a series of interactive scenes from well-known stories and fairy tales. Transportation between the two amusement parks is provided in the form of a miniature train powered by a steam-outline locomotive (a diesel locomotive made to look like a steam locomotive). During the summer, a troupe of local students performs plays at an amphitheater in the park based on fairy tales. The two parks underwent massive renovation in 2016, in order to repair and modernize their amenities and attractions.

=== Zoo ===
The Chaffee Zoo received a big break with the passing of Measure Z, which added a tenth of a cent city sales tax benefiting the zoo. Along with the tax, the zoo has changed from being city operated to being run by a private nonprofit 501(c)(3) organization. The land, exhibits and animals themselves are still owned by the City of Fresno but leased to the Fresno's Chaffee Zoo Corp.

The tax allowed for the hiring of Donna Fernandes from the Buffalo Zoo as the new director in 2005, but she left after only 3 months to return to her previous job. Lewis Greene, from the Virginia Zoo, was then hired as director in 2006 and secured an extension of AZA accreditation. Major changes and improvements at the zoo are in store in the upcoming years although the descendants of the original Roeding family are threatening a lawsuit if the zoo attempts to expand further into the park donated to the city by their ancestors for the purpose of a "public park."
