= Peninsular Railway (California) =

Former interurban electrified railway in California

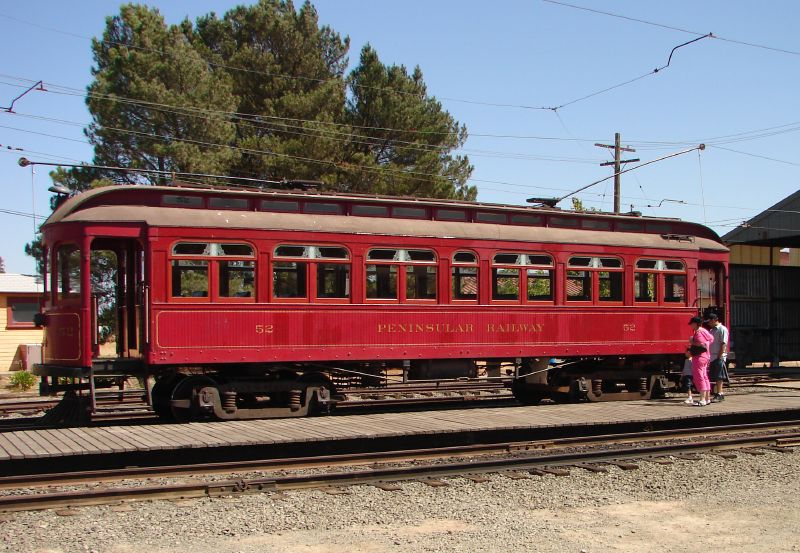
- Peninsular Railway 52 at the Western Railway Museum

Overview
- Headquarters: San Jose, California
- Locale: Santa Clara County, California
- Dates of operation: 1906–1934
- Predecessor: San Jose & Los Gatos Interurban Railroad
- Successor: Southern Pacific Railroad，San Jose Railroads

Technical
- Track gauge: 4 ft 8 1/2 in (1,435 mm) standard gauge
- Electrification: Overhead line, 600 V DC
- Length: 91 mi (146 km)

The Peninsular Railway (known to locals as the Pin) was an interurban electrified railway in the U.S. state of California in the United States of America. It served the area between San Jose, Los Gatos, and Palo Alto, comprising much of what is today known as "Silicon Valley". For much of its existence it was a subsidiary of the Southern Pacific Railroad.

== History ==
=== San Jose, Saratoga & Los Gatos Electric Railway (1900–1909) ===
Before the Peninsular Railway had built any track or started running interurban operations, F.S. Granger and J.W. Rea, who owned the San Jose Los Gatos Interurban Company, sold their tracks to the Pin to avoid competing with a company backed by the Southern Pacific. The original Pin tracks were from several other already existing interurban companies, such as the Alum Rock Railway Company, the Peninsular Railroad, and the Santa Clara Interurban Railroad. Some of the Peninsular Railroad and Alum Rock Railway trackage in San Jose became owned by the San Jose Railroads and were never a part of the Peninsular Railway.

=== Southern Pacific operations (1905–1934) ===
The Peninsular Railroad was incorporated on December 21, 1905 as a subsidiary of the Southern Pacific in response to calls for an interurban line from San Francisco to San Jose. In addition to the line to Los Gatos, branches were also planned to extend to Alviso, Oakland and Lick Observatory. However, due to the Colorado River flood of 1905 (which created the Salton Sea), many of the rails to be used for this construction had to be rushed to the Imperial Valley to rebuild the Southern Pacific line between Los Angeles and Yuma, Arizona. Therefore, only the lines connecting San Jose, Palo Alto and Los Gatos were constructed, and interurban service did not exist between Palo Alto and San Mateo.

The Peninsular Railway was incorporated in 1909 as the successor to the Peninsular Railroad, San Jose & Los Gatos Interurban Railway, and the Santa Clara Interurban Railway.

Another attempt to complete this line to San Francisco came in the next decade, with the Peninsular coming to an agreement with the United Railroads of San Francisco to run via their San Mateo interurban. Eight new cars were ordered for the planned service, but construction was again delayed by a scarcity of steel rails, this time due to World War I.

The trackage that the Peninsular Railway built itself was the line to Los Gatos through Campbell, the line along Stevens Creek Road to Cupertino, the two lines along the Mayfield cutoff from Cupertino to Mayfield, and Cupertino to Los Gatos, the spur to Congress Springs from Saratoga, and part of the line to Alum Rock Park.

By 1931, the system was operating 34 streetcars on 91.1 miles (146.6 km) of track.

Electric passenger service between San Jose and Palo Alto began on March 5, 1910, and ended on October 1, 1934. All of the lines were replaced by bus service by the late 1930s.

== Physical infrastructure ==
The properties of the Peninsular Railway included everything owned by the companies it acquired as well as necessary tracks, substations, and an interurban car barn in San Jose. The carbarn faced San Carlos street at the southwest corner of San Carlos and Sunol streets. By 1920, the 68-mile (109 km) system had several main tracks originating in San Jose.

=== San José ===
Interurban services

The primary route for all interurban trains began at a loop around Julian, Old Market, and Bassett Streets in front of the original Southern Pacific Railroad depot in San Jose. The Peninsular Railway had its own double track line down Market Street, which split into an eastbound and westbound pair of tracks going west on San Carlos Street and Park Avenue respectively. Trains west to Palo Alto or Saratoga would turn onto Meridian Street and follow the dedicated right of way along San Carlos Street, while trains south to Campbell and Los Gatos would turn onto Josefa and San Carlos Streets until the double track route on Bird Avenue.

Local services

- The Naglee park local route had its own loop on San Fernando, 15th, and San Carlos streets.
- The Bascom local route followed the main tracks west until San Carlos and Bascom, the dedicated right of way was double-tracked from Meridian until Bascom permitting extra local service.

Alum Rock line

The Peninsular Interurban owned a line from North 10th Street and Madera Avenue to Alum Rock Park on which it would run freight service and run passenger trains along with the San Jose Railroads.

=== Rural county ===
==== Palo Alto local lines ====
The Peninsular Railroad operated several local streetcar lines in and near Palo Alto. Service there began on November 15, 1906 under the name Santa Clara Interurban Railroad Company. These operations were acquired by the Peninsular Railway on June 30, 1909. Operations mostly comprised two lines:

- University Avenue–Ravenswood — Ran east from the Southern Pacific depot, initially to Pope Street. Tracks were extended past San Francisquito Creek, but service was cut back to the creek after disputes about bridge maintenance.
- Waverly Street–Stanford — Initially ran from Embarcadero and Waverly on Waverly to University, then to Stanford. It was later extended from Embarcadero to Oregon Avenue. Service began in 1909. Track on the south side of Galvez Street were leased from Stanford University, and continued past the Stanford Stadium until Lasuen Street, where it continued until turning west along Serra Mall ending at the Palm Drive Oval.

Local service ended on September 27, 1925, though service to Stanford continued until October 21, 1929.

Other towns

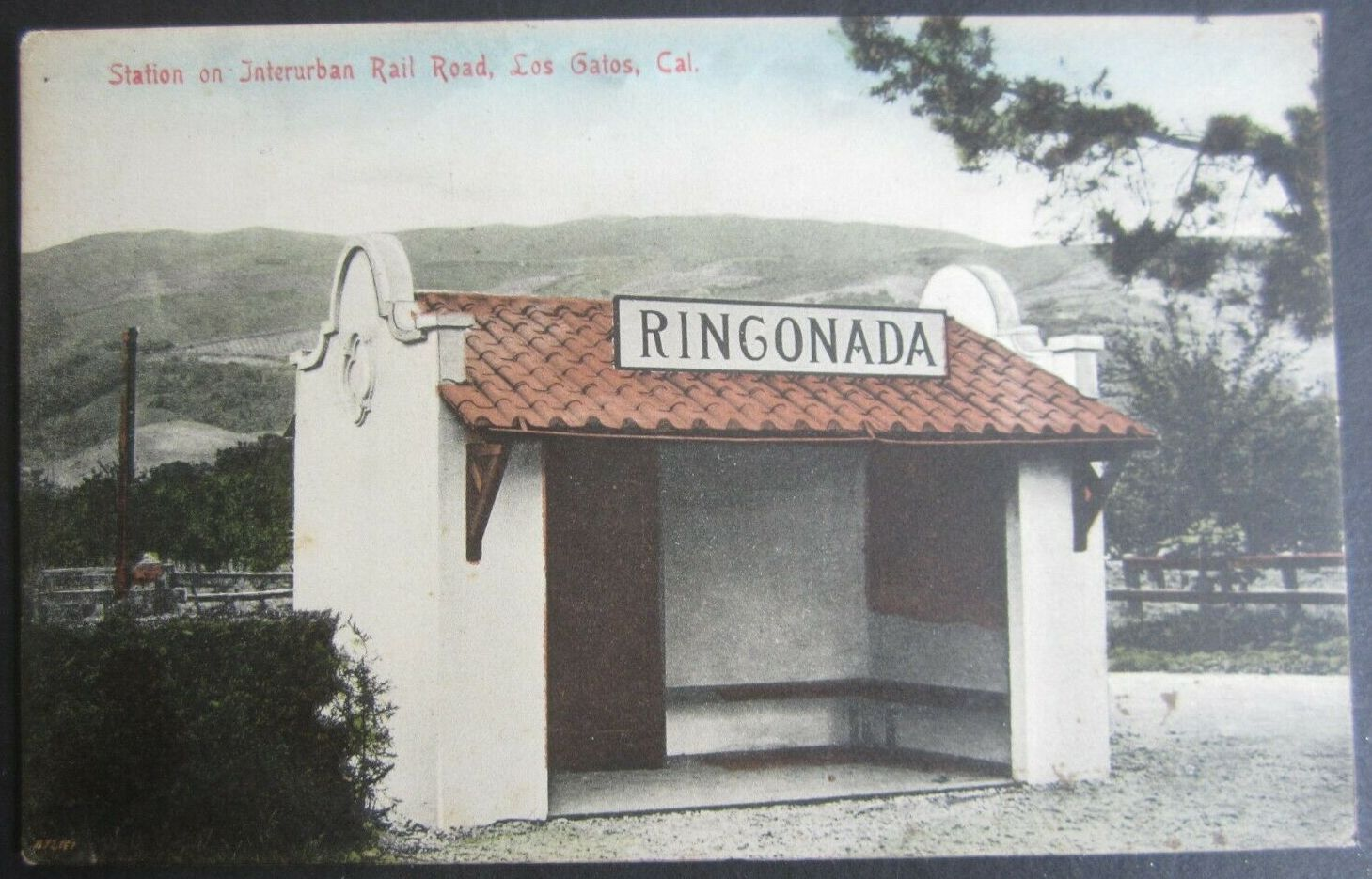
Postcard view of the Rinconada stop in Los Gatos

The Peninsular Railway tracks serviced many other towns with regional hourly service including Los Altos, Cupertino, Saratoga, Los Gatos, and Campbell. The main tracks operating electric service were on Stevens Creek Road (now Stevens Creek Boulevard), Saratoga Road from Meridian corners (today Saratoga and Stevens Creek) to downtown Saratoga, the Mayfield cut-off from Mayfield to Congress Junction (along today's Foothill Expressway and California State Route 85), and a route looping through Willow Glen, Campbell, Los Gatos, and Saratoga with a winding path on various county roads. Stops typically had a shelter, as indicated by various historical photos.

Congress Springs branch

The Peninsular Railway also operated a branch line from downtown Saratoga going southwest along Big Basin Road, terminating at the Congress Hotel.

== List of interurban services ==
Regional services
Line name	Start date	End date	Origin	Destination	Approx. headway	Detailed route	Notes
San Jose–Saratoga–Los Gatos	March 19, 1904	March 12, 1933	Market Street Depot	Los Gatos Main street Southern Pacific station	Every 60 minutes until midnight	Market street, pair of tracks on Park and San Carlos, Stevens Creek Road, Saratoga Road, Saratoga Los Gatos Road	
San Jose–Campbell–Los Gatos	1907	March 31, 1932	Market Street Depot	Los Gatos Main street Southern Pacific station	Every 60 minutes until midnight	Market street, pair of tracks on Park and San Carlos, Bird Avenue, Willow street, Meridian street, Hamilton avenue, Bascom avenue, Campbell avenue, Railway Avenue, shared segment with SP, Los Gatos Boulevard	
San Jose–Los Altos–Palo Alto	March 5, 1910	September 30, 1934	Market Street Depot	Palo Alto station	Every 60 minutes	Market street, pair of tracks on Park and San Carlos, Stevens Creek Road, Mayfield cut-off, El Camino	Stub service along the Mayfield cut-off operated in 1909, while the line was under construction. Cut back to Mayfield in 1929.
Palo Alto–Los Altos–Los Gatos	1910	October 1, 1934	Palo Alto station	Los Gatos	Every 60 minutes	El Camino, Mayfield cut-off to Congress Junction, Saratoga avenue, Saratoga Los Gatos Road, Main Street	Cut back to Mayfield in 1929
Alum Rock line	[data missing]	June 11, 1932	Berryessa	Alum Rock Park	Every 60 minutes	Dedicated right of way from 10th/Madera to Alum Rock Park	Passenger service often operated by the San Jose Railroads. Through-service changed from 17th street to King Road in July 1923. Freight service continued until mid 1934 then transferred to the Visalia Electric Railroad which operated freight service until 1938

Short-turn services
Line name	Start date	End date	Origin	Destination	Approx. Train Frequency/Span	Detailed route	Notes
Bascom local	[data missing]	c. 1938	Market Street Depot	Stevens Creek Road and Bascom	Every 30 minutes	Market street, pair of tracks on Park and San Carlos, Stevens Creek Road	Transferred to San Jose Railroads.
Naglee Park local	[data missing]	c. 1938	Market Street Depot	Naglee Park	Every 15 minutes	Market street, loop around San Fernando, 15th, and San Carlos streets.	Originally intended to be the route to Lick Observatory. Transferred to San Jose Railroads.
Congress Springs branch	July 10, 1904	c. 1933	Saratoga station	Congress Hotel	Irregular	Big Basin Road	
Stanford "Toonerville" Campus line	October 6, 1909	October 20, 1929	Palo Alto station	Stanford University			El Camino, Leased track south of Galvez, Lasuen
University avenue line	[data missing]	July 19, 1925	Palo Alto station	City border at San Francisquito Creek	Every 15–20 minutes	University Avenue	Frequency varied depending on the year
Waverly Street line	[data missing]	September 27, 1925	Palo Alto station	Waverly / Oregon	Every 15–20 minutes	University avenue, Waverly street	Frequency varied depending on the year

== Surviving equipment ==
Peninsular Railway 52 and 61 are both preserved at the Western Railway Museum. Both cars were built in 1903 by the American Car Company for the Los Gatos Interurban Railway Company. After the discontinuation of service in 1934, 52 was stripped of all electrical and mechanical equipment and its wooden car body spent 35 years as a sewing room adjacent to a private residence in San Jose. Since its restoration in the 1970s, 52 has been operated for tourist excursions. Trailer car 61 had a similar post-service history and has been awaiting restoration since being donated to the Bay Area Electric Railway Association in 1980.

The wooden car body of Peninsular Railway 102 is speculated to have been built into a roadside diner south of Shafter, CA. 102 was built by the St. Louis Car Company for the Peninsular Railway in 1909 as part of a combined order of similar cars with the Pacific Electric. Following a brief service on the Fresno Traction Company, 102 was sold to the Pacific Electric in 1918 and renumbered 466. Pacific Electric sold the car in 1935 and by 1943 the car body had been moved to its current location.

== See also ==
- BART
- Caltrain
- East Bay Electric Lines — Southern Pacific's interurban service in the East Bay
- List of California street railroads
- San Jose Railroads
- VTA light rail
- Saratoga and Almaden Railroad
