= John H. Christie =

American architect

John H. Christie (1878–1960) was an American architect who worked for the Southern Pacific Railroad, and was the railroad's chief architect from 1924 to 1947.

Christie was born Johann Heinrich Christiansen in 1878, emigrated from Germany, and was naturalized as an American citizen in 1899. He studied architecture in Pennsylvania and Europe, then returned to Oakland, California. He was hired by Southern Pacific as a junior draftsman in 1904 working for civil engineer John D. Isaacs, and was certified to practice architecture in California in 1913. Christie succeeded Daniel J. Patterson as chief architect in 1924, and became a member of the American Institute of Architects in 1926. He retired from Southern Pacific in 1947 but continued to work in private practice. At least four stations Christie designed have been listed in the National Register of Historic Places.

== Works ==
- Salem station (Oregon), 500 13th Street SE, Salem, Oregon, 1918, Beaux Arts style, NRHP-listed
- Southern Pacific Depot, Mesa, Arizona, 1931, burned 1989
- San Jose Diridon Station, 65 Cahill Street, San Jose, California, 1935, Italian Renaissance Revival style, NRHP-listed
- Union Station (Los Angeles), 800 North Alameda Street, Los Angeles, California, 1939, Spanish Colonial, Mission Revival and Art Deco styles, by John and Donald Parkinson in collaboration with tenant railroad architects H. L. Gilman (Santa Fe), J. H. Christie (Southern Pacific), and J. R. Wirth (Union Pacific), and landscape architect Tommy Tomson, NRHP-listed
- Palo Alto (Caltrain station), 95 University Avenue, Palo Alto, California, 1941, Streamline Moderne style, NRHP-listed
- remodeling of Southern Pacific's 1915 Fresno depot
- Grand Lake Lutheran Church complex, Oakland, California

== Gallery ==
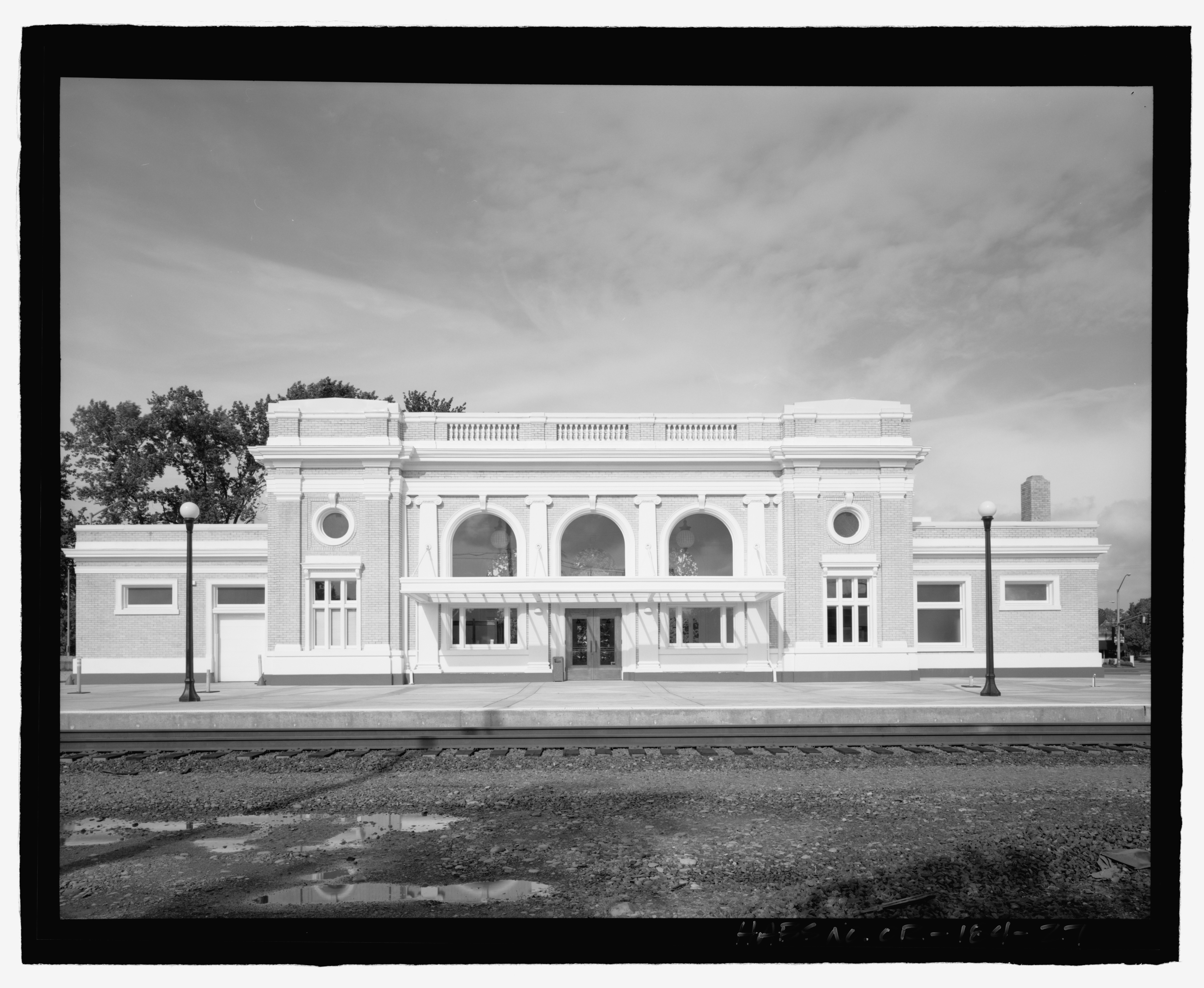
Southern Pacific Railroad Station, Salem, Oregon

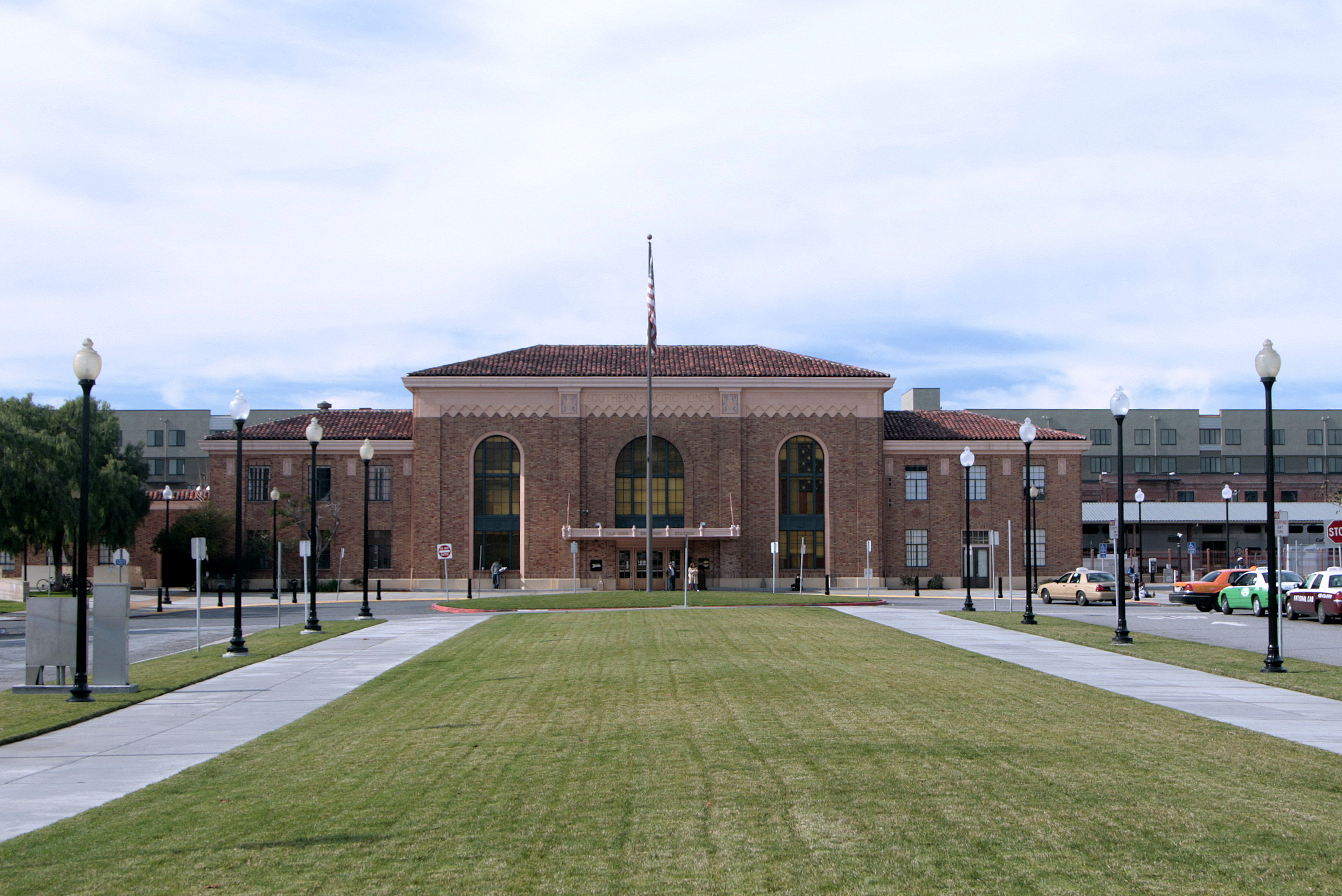
Southern Pacific Railroad Diridon Station, San Jose, California

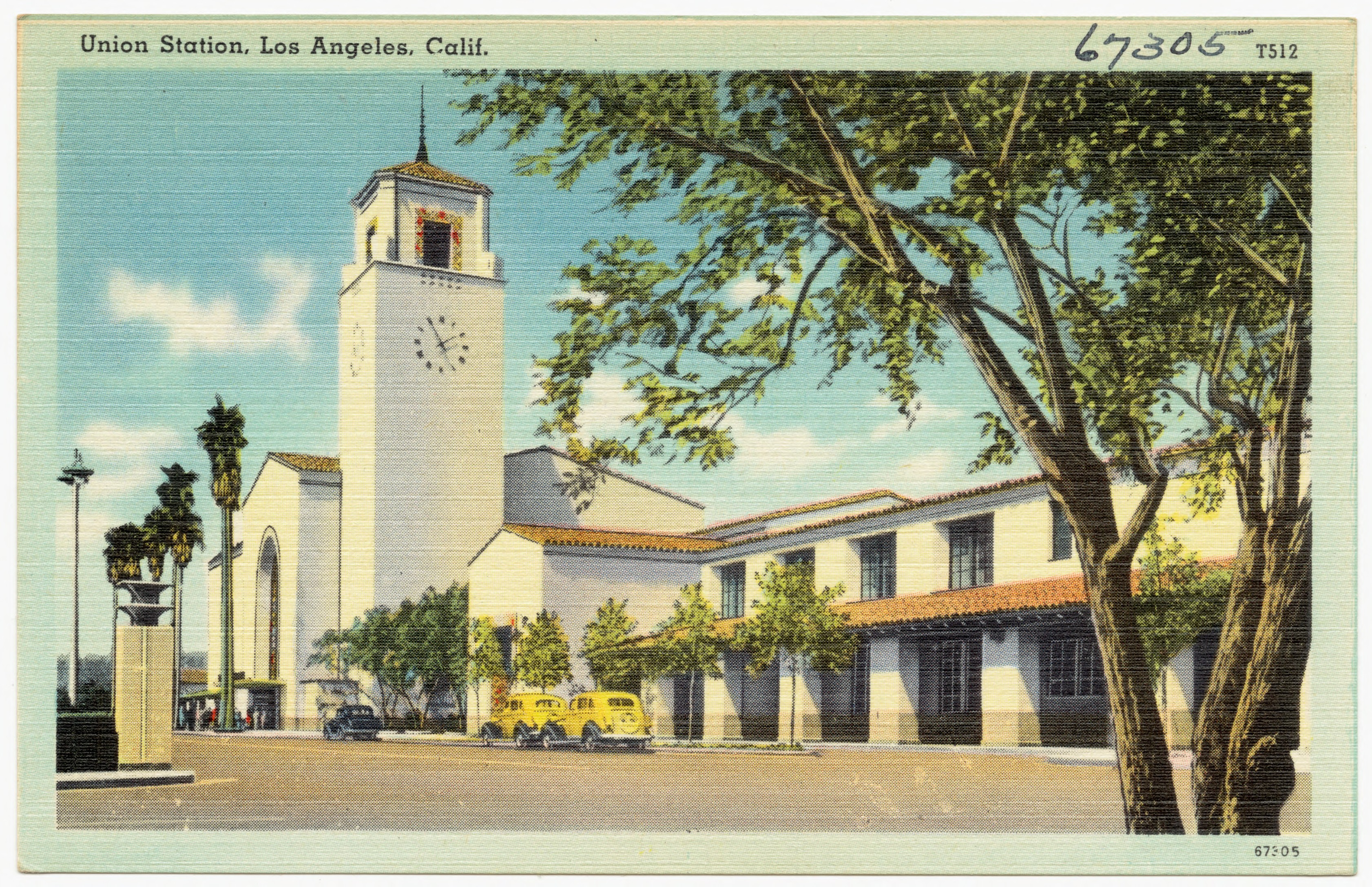
Union Station, Los Angeles, California (contributor)

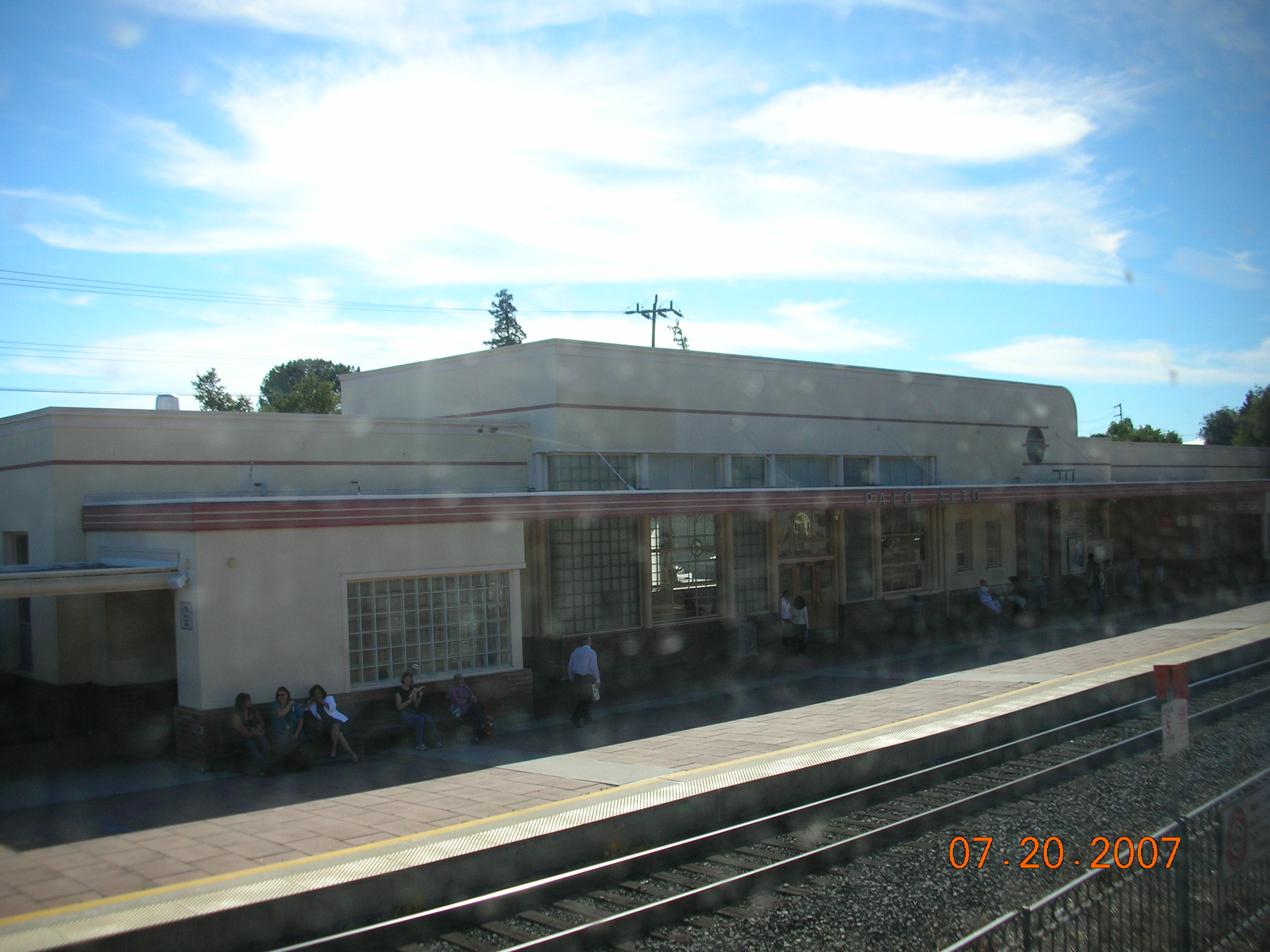
Southern Pacific Station, Palo Alto, California
