= Stanford Stadium =

College stadium in California, USA

- The Farm
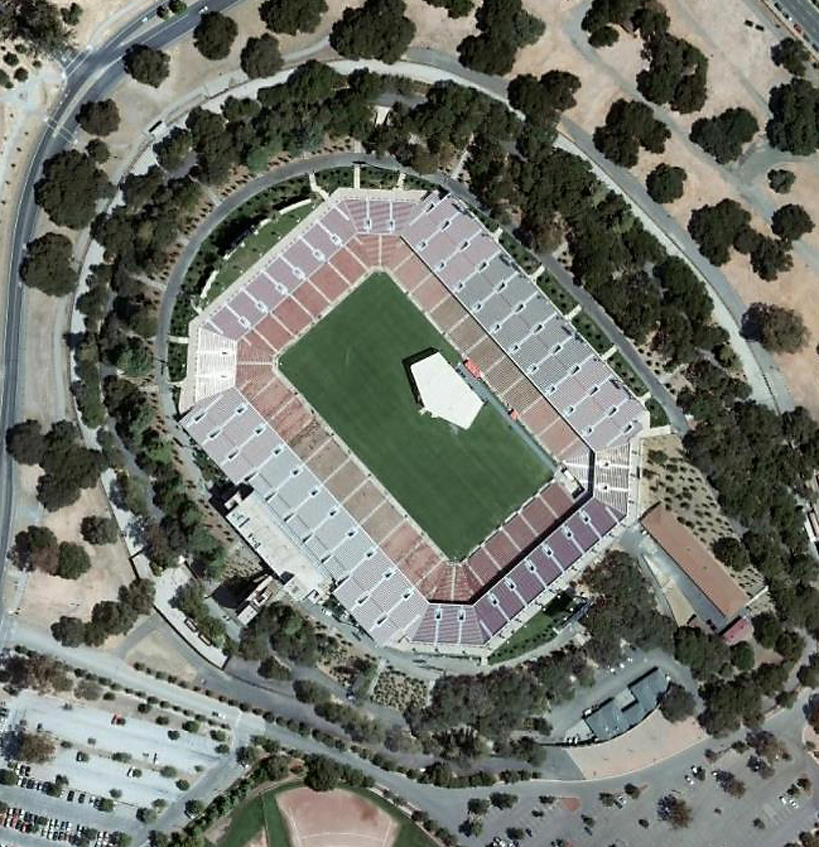
- The new Stanford Stadium

- Location in the United States Location in California
- Interactive map of Stanford Stadium
- Address: 625 Nelson Road
- Location: Stanford University; Stanford, California, United States
- Coordinates: 37°26′4″N 122°09′40″W
- Owner: Stanford University
- Operator: Stanford University
- Capacity: 50,424 (2013–present) Former capacity: List: 50,360 (2011–12); 50,000 (2006–10); 85,500 (1992–2005); 86,019 (1987–91); 84,892 (1982–86); 86,352 (1973–81); 87,206 (1971–72); 90,000 (1935–70); 89,000 (1927–34); 70,200 (1925–26); 60,000 (1921–24)
- Surface: Natural grass
- Public transit: Stanford (game days only)

Construction
- Groundbreaking: June 1, 1921 (original stadium); November 26, 2005 (current stadium)
- Opened: October 1, 1921; 104 years ago (original stadium); September 16, 2006 (current stadium)
- Renovated: 1985, 1995
- Demolished: 2005
- Cost: $90 million (2006) $200,000 (1921)
- Architects: Hoover and Associates (2006 renovation)
- General contractors: Vance Brown Builders (2006 renovation)

Tenants
- Stanford Cardinal football (NCAA) (1921–present); San Francisco 49ers (NFL) (1989, single game); San Jose Earthquakes (MLS) (2011–present) (selected matches); Stanford Cardinal softball (NCAA) (2025)

Website
- gostanford.com//stanford-stadium

Stanford Stadium is an outdoor college football stadium located on the campus of Stanford University in Stanford, California, United States. It is the home of the Stanford Cardinal and hosts the university's commencement exercises. Opened 105 years ago in 1921 as a football and track and field stadium, it was an earthen horseshoe with wooden bleacher seating and flooring upon a steel frame. Its original seating capacity was 60,000, which grew to 89,000 by 1927 as a nearly enclosed bowl.

Immediately following the 2005 season, the stadium was demolished and rebuilt as a dual-deck concrete structure, without a track. Today, it seats 50,424. The natural grass playing field runs northwest to southeast, at an approximate elevation of sixty feet (18 m) above sea level.

== Early history ==
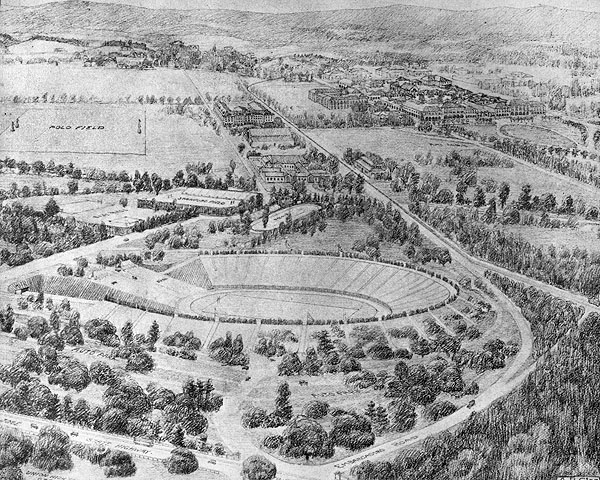
Stanford Stadium in 1921

Stanford Stadium was built in five months in 1921 and opened its gates on November 19, replacing Stanford Field. The first game was against rival California, who defeated Stanford 42–7 in the Big Game. Seating capacity was originally 60,000, with a 66-row, U-Shaped structure second only to the Yale Bowl in size at the time.

In 1925, 10,200 seats were added to the stadium, nearly enclosing the horseshoe while still keeping the overall height of the facility intact. In 1927, fourteen additional rows of seating were added, increasing the stadium to its maximum capacity of 85,500, with eighty rows of seating. In 1932, the stadium hosted the USA Outdoor Track and Field Championships. In 1935, Stanford Stadium set a record (for the time) for single-game attendance, with 94,000 spectators filling it for a 13–0 victory over California.

=== NFL ===
On December 14, 1982, it was announced that Stanford Stadium would host Super Bowl XIX in 1985 to become the first Super Bowl hosted in the Bay Area; its stadium capacity of over 80,000 exceeded both of the stadiums inhabited by Bay Area teams of the time in Candlestick Park (60,000+) and Oakland Coliseum (53,000+). Renovations at the cost of over $2 million (with a significant portion given by the NFL) were done to improve the facilities (ranging from the water systems to the renovation of Row 80 to a renovated ticket office) prior to the Super Bowl being played. A portable lighting system was also brought in for the game, which would start at 3pm local time.

In January 1985, Super Bowl XIX was held in Stanford Stadium, with the Bay Area's own San Francisco 49ers defeating the Miami Dolphins, 38–16.

As of 2025, Stanford Stadium is one of two venues (the Rose Bowl being the other) to host a Super Bowl without previously serving as the home stadium of a National Football League (NFL) or American Football League (AFL) team, and Super Bowl XIX is one of only three Super Bowls where the host region saw its team win (the others being Super Bowl LV and Super Bowl LVI, where the Tampa Bay Buccaneers and the Los Angeles Rams respectively became the first two teams to play and win a Super Bowl at their home stadiums).

On October 22, 1989, the San Francisco 49ers played a home game at the stadium against the New England Patriots, as Candlestick Park had suffered serious damage following the Loma Prieta earthquake five days earlier.

=== Soccer ===
The stadium has hosted soccer matches for the 1984 Summer Olympics as one of three venues outside southern California for that Olympics, the 1994 FIFA World Cup, and the 1999 FIFA Women's World Cup.

Major League Soccer's San Jose Earthquakes have hosted one match at the stadium each year since 2011. The first year's opponent was the New York Red Bulls; since 2012, the Earthquakes have used the stadium to host their home leg of the California Clásico versus the Los Angeles Galaxy.

1994 FIFA World Cup matches

Date	Time (UTC−7)	Team #1	Result	Team #2	Round	Attendance
June 20, 1994	13:00	Brazil	2–0	Russia	Group B	81,061
June 24, 1994	13:00	Brazil	3–0	Cameroon	Group B	83,401
June 26, 1994	13:00	Switzerland	0–2	Colombia	Group A	83,401
June 28, 1994	13:00	Russia	6–1	Cameroon	Group B	74,914
July 4, 1994	12:35	Brazil	1–0	United States	Round of 16	84,147
July 10, 1994	12:35	Romania	2–2 (a.e.t.) (4–5 pen.)	Sweden	Quarter-final	83,500

1999 FIFA Women's World Cup match

Date	Time (UTC−7)	Team #1	Result	Team #2	Round	Attendance
July 4, 1999	13:30	United States	2–0	Brazil	Semi-final	73,123

=== Other international soccer matches ===
Date	Competition	Team	Res	Team	Crowd
December 14, 1996	1998 FIFA World Cup Qualifying (CONCACAF)	United States	2–1	Costa Rica	40,527
March 16, 1997	1998 FIFA World Cup Qualifying (CONCACAF)	United States	3–0	Canada	28,898

=== Softball ===
With Stanford extensively renovating its softball park, Boyd & Jill Smith Family Stadium, after the 2024 season, the university moved home softball games to Stanford Stadium for the 2025 season. The Cardinal set a new NCAA single-game attendance record on April 19, 2025 when 13,207 attended Stanford's rivalry game against California.

=== Other notable events ===
Other high-profile events hosted at Stanford Stadium include Herbert Hoover's acceptance speech for the 1928 Republican Presidential nomination and the 1962 edition of the long-running (1958–1985) series of track meets between the United States and the Soviet Union. Coldplay played at the stadium on May 31 and June 1, 2025 as part of their Music of the Spheres World Tour, making them the first act to hold two shows there on a single tour. BTS performed three concerts on May 16, 17, and 19, 2026, as part of their Arirang World Tour.

== Modern renovations ==
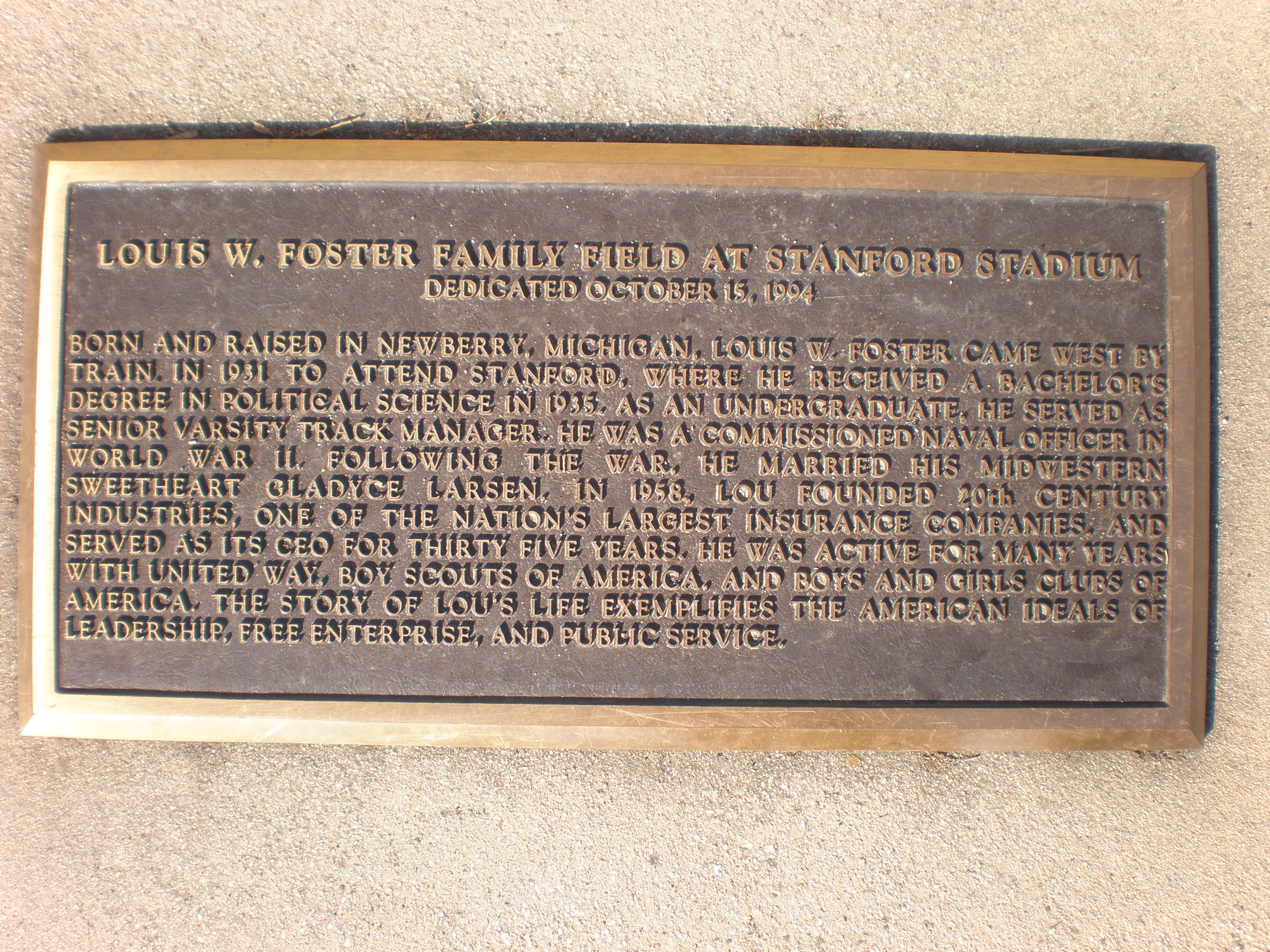
Plaque commemorating the dedication of Louis W. Foster Family Field in 1995

The stadium has undergone a number of significant renovations since the 1920s. In 1960, a press box was added, while the first, and last synthetic athletics track was installed in 1978 (replacing the cinder track that had been used for many years).

In 1985, prior to Super Bowl XIX, the press box was renovated, new locker rooms were installed, a ticket complex and dressing room for game officials were added, and the number of restrooms were increased.

In 1994, prior to the 1994 FIFA World Cup, the lower level of the press box was expanded and aluminum benches were installed throughout the stadium. The crown of the playing surface was also reduced.

In 1995, a $10 million gift from Los Angeles insurance executive and 1935 Stanford graduate Louis W. Foster enabled further updates to the stadium, including widening the concourse, improving the restrooms, and replacing the remaining wooden seats. In honor of his gift, Stanford named the playing surface the Louis W. Foster Family Field at Stanford Stadium.

=== 2005–2006 demolition and reconstruction ===
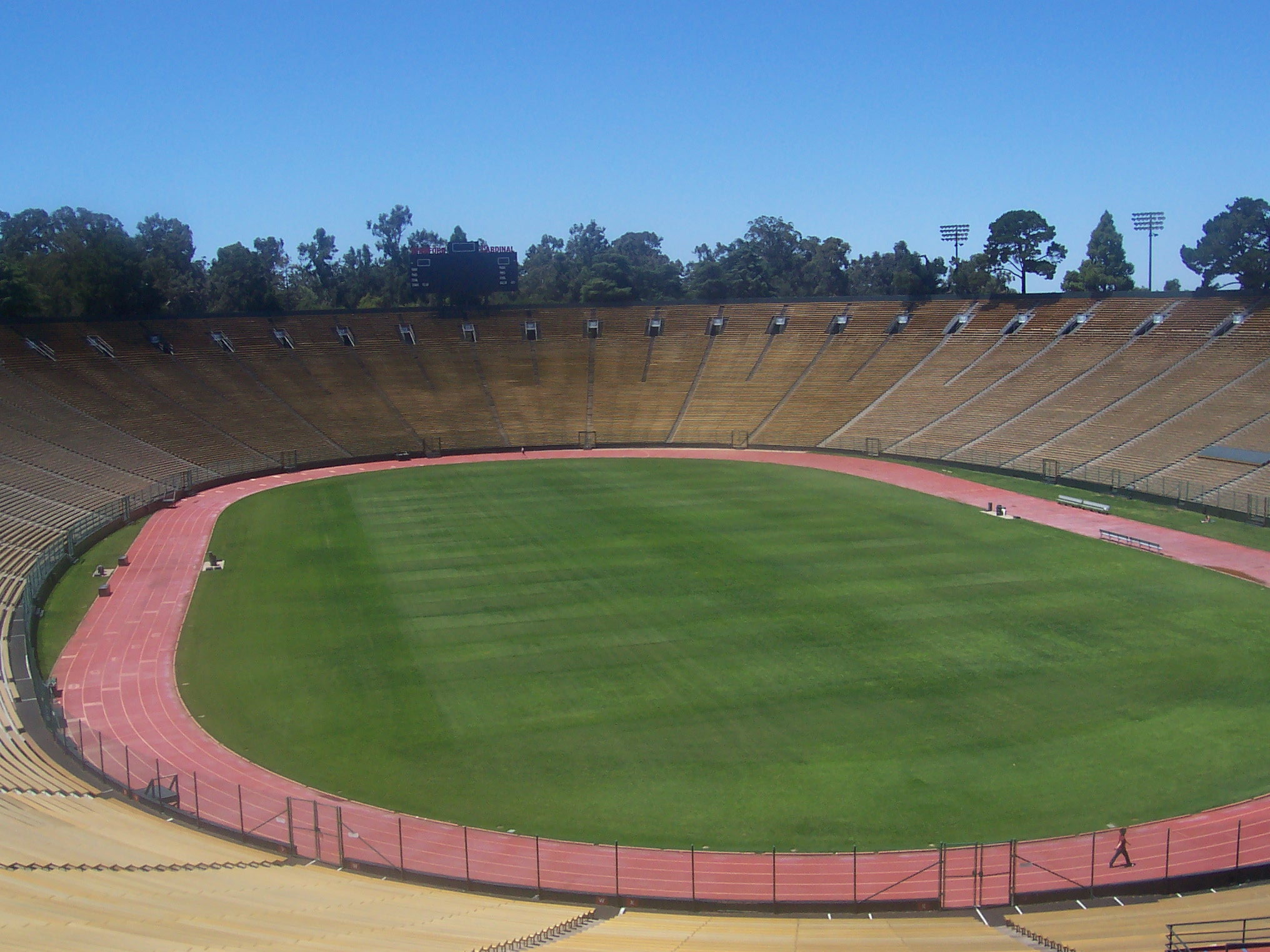
The stadium's interior in May 2004, prior to its reconstruction

In June 2005, the university board of trustees authorized plans for the stadium's demolition and reconstruction that would remove the track, reduce the stadium capacity, and bring it up to date with present standards for sporting venues. Various justifications for the renovation included poor sightlines in the existing stadium (rendering the bottom 14 rows unusable), long stairways, and lack of adequate restroom facilities. The track around the stadium had previously created a large distance between the field and the spectators.

The capacity of the new stadium was set to be approximately 50,000 seats, which were made by Ducharme Seating. The reduction in capacity was a strategic decision by Stanford's Athletics Program to boost season ticket sales and create a more intimate playing atmosphere without sacrificing the ability to host large world-class events, such as the FIFA World Cup, in the future. This was partially the result of San Francisco's failure to secure a bid for the 2012 Olympics, which would have featured a renovated Stanford Stadium as the main Olympic Venue.

Construction began minutes after the Cardinal's last home game of the 2005 football season, a 38–31 loss to Notre Dame on November 26. Bulldozers began tearing out the natural field turf in a ceremony held while attendees were still in the stadium for the game. Construction proceeded quickly through the winter and spring with the goal of opening in time for Stanford's game against San Jose State on September 9, 2006, but the game had to be relocated to San Jose State's Spartan Stadium due to an unusually wet winter and resulting construction delays. In the summer of 2006, a construction worker fell 23 feet (7.0 m) to his death.

The stadium opened on September 16, 2006 with Stanford losing to Navy 37–9. The Stanford Band was not present at the stadium opening since they were not permitted to play at any athletic events in the month of September due to accusations of vandalism to a temporary trailer which formerly served as their rehearsal facility. Instead, the Navy band performed at halftime and played throughout the game.

The facility now has a rectangular shape, occupies 18.4 acres (74,000 m^{2}) with a footprint of 601,128 sq ft (55,847 m^{2}), and has a playing surface 29 feet (8.8 m) below ground level. The stadium has 43 rows on the sides, 22 rows on the ends, and 30 rows below the skybox. The skybox also has 437 spectator seats, more than double the number of the previous press box.

In 2013, Stanford upgraded its scoreboards with twin HD video boards. Also, a 1,673-foot (510 m) ribbon board was added, which displays out-of-town scores and real-time statistics.

Panoramic views of Stanford Stadium through the ages

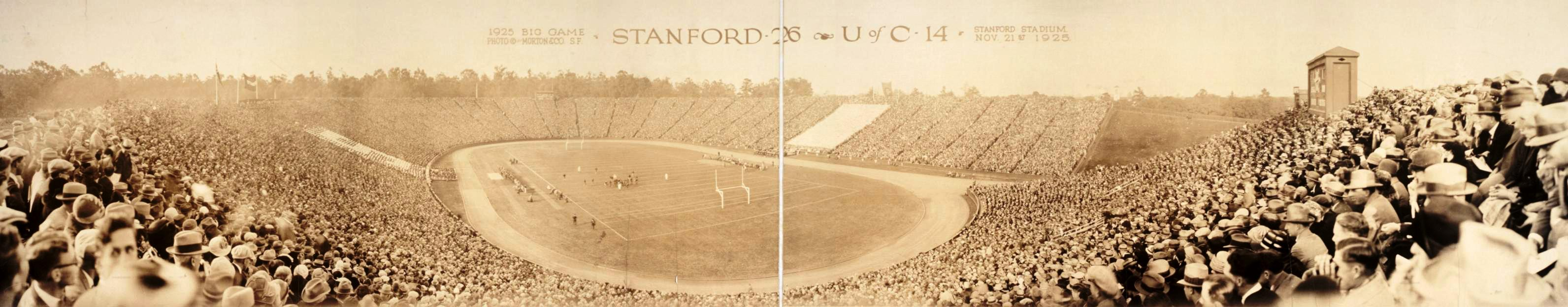
View of the stadium during the Big Game of November 21, 1925

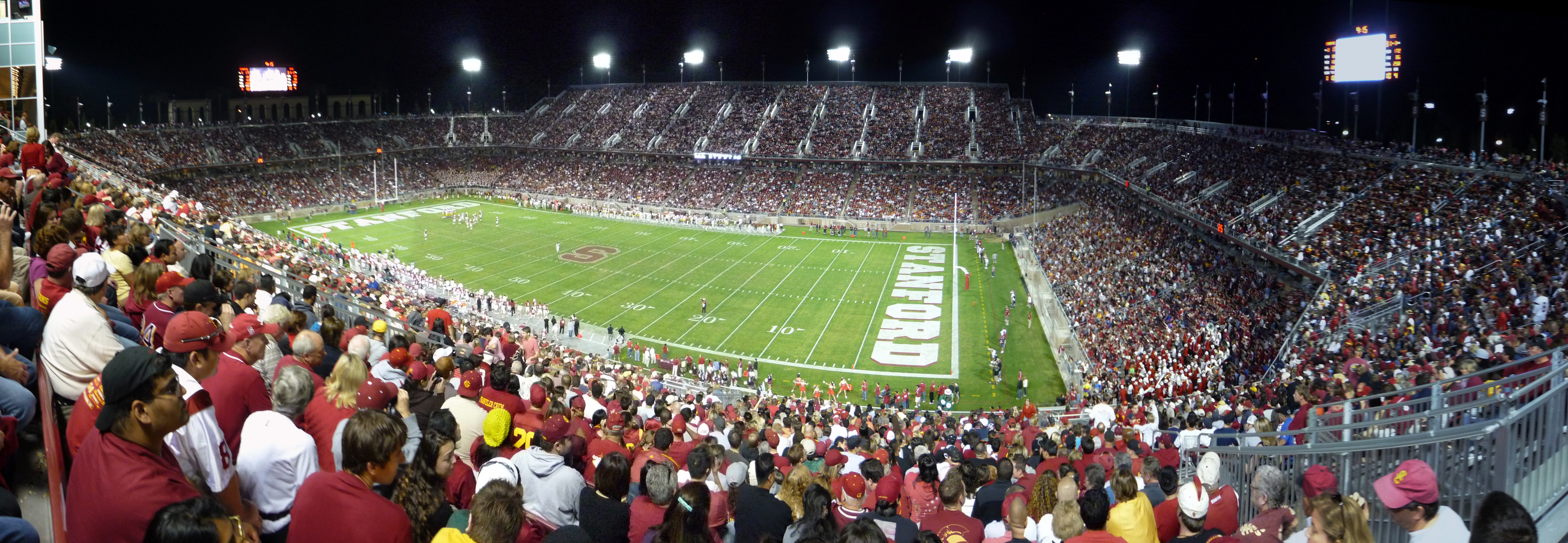
The 2008 Stanford-USC game, played on November 15, marked the first sellout of the new stadium since its re-opening in 2006.

== See also ==
- List of NCAA Division I FBS football stadiums

Preceded by Tampa Stadium	Host of Super Bowl; XIX 1985	Succeeded by Louisiana Superdome
Preceded by Tampa Stadium	Host of the College Cup; 1981	Succeeded by Lockhart Stadium
Preceded by various venues Soviet Union	Summer Olympics; Soccer venue 1984	Succeeded by various venues South Korea
