= Stanford station =

Train station in Palo Alto, California, U.S.

Stanford
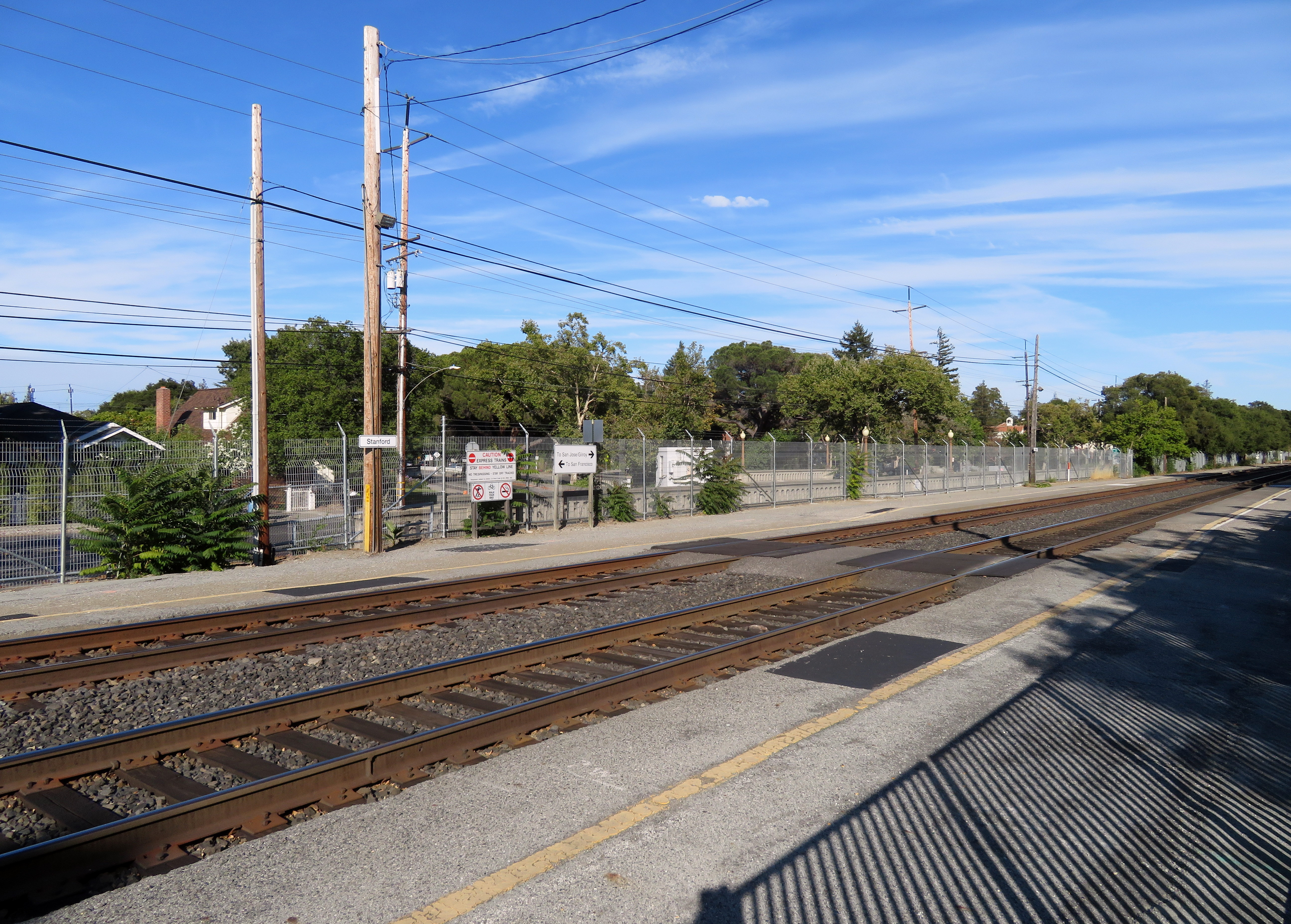
- Platforms at Stanford station in July 2018

General information
- Location: 100 Embarcadero Road; Palo Alto, California
- Coordinates: 37°26′19″N 122°09′24″W
- Owner: Peninsula Corridor Joint Powers Board (PCJPB)
- Line: PCJPB Peninsula Subdivision
- Platforms: 2 side platforms
- Tracks: 2

Construction
- Accessible: Partial, no wheelchair lift available

Other information
- Status: Football game days only
- Fare zone: 3

History
- Opened: c. 1920s
- Closed: 2026
- Original company: Southern Pacific

Services
Preceding station	Caltrain	Following station
Palo Alto toward San Francisco	Weekend Local (select trains on football game days only)	California Avenue toward San Jose Diridon or Tamien
Local does not stop here
Limited does not stop here
Express does not stop here
Former services
Preceding station	Caltrain	Following station
Palo Alto toward San Francisco	Weekend Local (L2) Game days only	California Avenue toward San Jose Diridon or Tamien
Location

Stanford station was a Caltrain station in Palo Alto, California, near the stadium on the Stanford University campus. It was not a regular service stop; instead, it was only in service for Stanford football home games and other large events at the stadium. The usual stop for the university is the Palo Alto station, located 0.57 miles (0.92 km) north of this station. The station did not have any ticket vending machines; however, when in use, Caltrain staff was present with handheld Clipper card readers so people can tag on and off the train.

Service to the station existed as early as 1922 (one year after the Stanford Stadium opened). In 1994, an estimated 20% of the visitors to the 1994 FIFA World Cup soccer games at Stanford arrived by train. In 2026, Caltrain discontinued service to the station, even on game days, in order to cut costs.
