= Palo Alto station =

Train station in Palo Alto, California, U.S.

Palo Alto
- A southbound train arriving at Palo Alto station in 2026

General information
- Location: 95 University Avenue; Palo Alto, California
- Coordinates: 37°26′37″N 122°09′55″W
- Owner: Stanford University; City of Palo Alto
- Line: PCJPB Peninsula Subdivision
- Platforms: 2 side platforms
- Tracks: 2
- Connections: City of Palo Alto shuttles: Crosstown, Embarcadero; Dumbarton Express: DB; East Palo Alto shuttle; Menlo Park midday shuttle; Samtrans: ECR, 280, 281, 296, 397; VTA: 21, 22, Rapid 522; Stanford Health Care TECH shuttle; Stanford Marguerite: MC, N, O, P, RP, S, SE, X, Y

Construction
- Parking: 389 spaces; paid
- Cycle facilities: 178 racks and 94 lockers
- Accessible: Yes

Other information
- Fare zone: 3

History
- Opened: 1890
- Rebuilt: 1893, 1896, 1941
- Original company: Southern Pacific

Passengers
- FY 2025: 3,603 (weekday avg.) ▲25%

Services
| Preceding station | Caltrain | Following station |
|---|---|---|
| Menlo Park toward San Francisco | Local | California Avenue toward San Jose Diridon or Tamien |
| Menlo Park toward San Francisco | Limited | California Avenue toward San Jose Diridon |
| Redwood City toward San Francisco | Express | Mountain View toward San Jose Diridon |
| Menlo Park toward San Francisco | Weekend Local | California Avenue toward San Jose Diridon or Tamien |
| Menlo Park toward San Francisco | Weekend Local | Stanford (select trains on game days) toward San Jose Diridon or Tamien |
Former services
| Preceding station | Caltrain | Following station |
|---|---|---|
| Menlo Park toward San Francisco | Local (L1) | California Avenue toward San Jose Diridon or Tamien |
| Menlo Park toward San Francisco | Weekend Local (L2) | California Avenue toward San Jose Diridon or Tamien |
| Menlo Park toward San Francisco | Weekend Local (L2) | Stanford (select trains on game days) toward San Jose Diridon or Tamien |
| Menlo Park toward San Francisco | Limited (L3) | California Avenue toward San Jose Diridon, Tamien or Gilroy |
| Redwood City toward San Francisco | Limited (L4) | Mountain View toward San Jose Diridon, Tamien or Gilroy |
| Menlo Park toward San Francisco | Limited (L5) | Mountain View toward San Jose Diridon or Tamien |
| Redwood City toward San Francisco | Baby Bullet (B7) | Mountain View toward San Jose Diridon |
| Preceding station | Southern Pacific Railroad | Following station |
| Menlo Park toward San Francisco | Coast Line | California Avenue toward Los Angeles |
| Menlo Park toward San Francisco | Peninsula Commute | Stanford toward San Jose |
Peninsular Railway
| Terminus | Palo Alto – Jose | Mayfield toward Market Street Depot |
| Terminus | Palo Alto – Los Gatos | Mayfield toward Los Gatos |
- Palo Alto Southern Pacific Railroad Depot
- U.S. National Register of Historic Places
- Built: 1940-41
- Architect: John H. Christie
- Architectural style: Streamline Moderne
- NRHP reference No.: 96000425
- Added to NRHP: April 18, 1996
Location

Palo Alto station (also called Palo Alto Transit Center) is an intermodal transit center in Palo Alto, California. It is served by Caltrain regional rail service, SamTrans and Santa Clara VTA local bus service, Dumbarton Express regional bus service, the Stanford University Marguerite Shuttle, and several local shuttle services. Palo Alto is the second-busiest Caltrain station after San Francisco, averaging 7,764 weekday boardings by a 2018 count. The Caltrain station has two side platforms serving the two tracks of the Peninsula Subdivision and a nearby bus transfer plaza.

The San Francisco and San Jose Railroad was built through then-empty land north of Mayfield in 1863. The first Palo Alto station was opened in 1890 to serve the then-newly established Stanford University. It was replaced by a larger depot in 1896. The Southern Pacific Railroad opened a new station in 1941 as part of a grade separation project. Designed by John H. Christie, it was constructed in the Streamline Moderne style to match the railroad's Daylight series of streamlined passenger trains. Intercity service to Palo Alto ended in 1971; the Peninsula Commute service continued and was renamed Caltrain in 1985. The station building was listed on the National Register of Historic Places as Palo Alto Southern Pacific Railroad Depot in 1996.

== History ==
=== Early stations ===
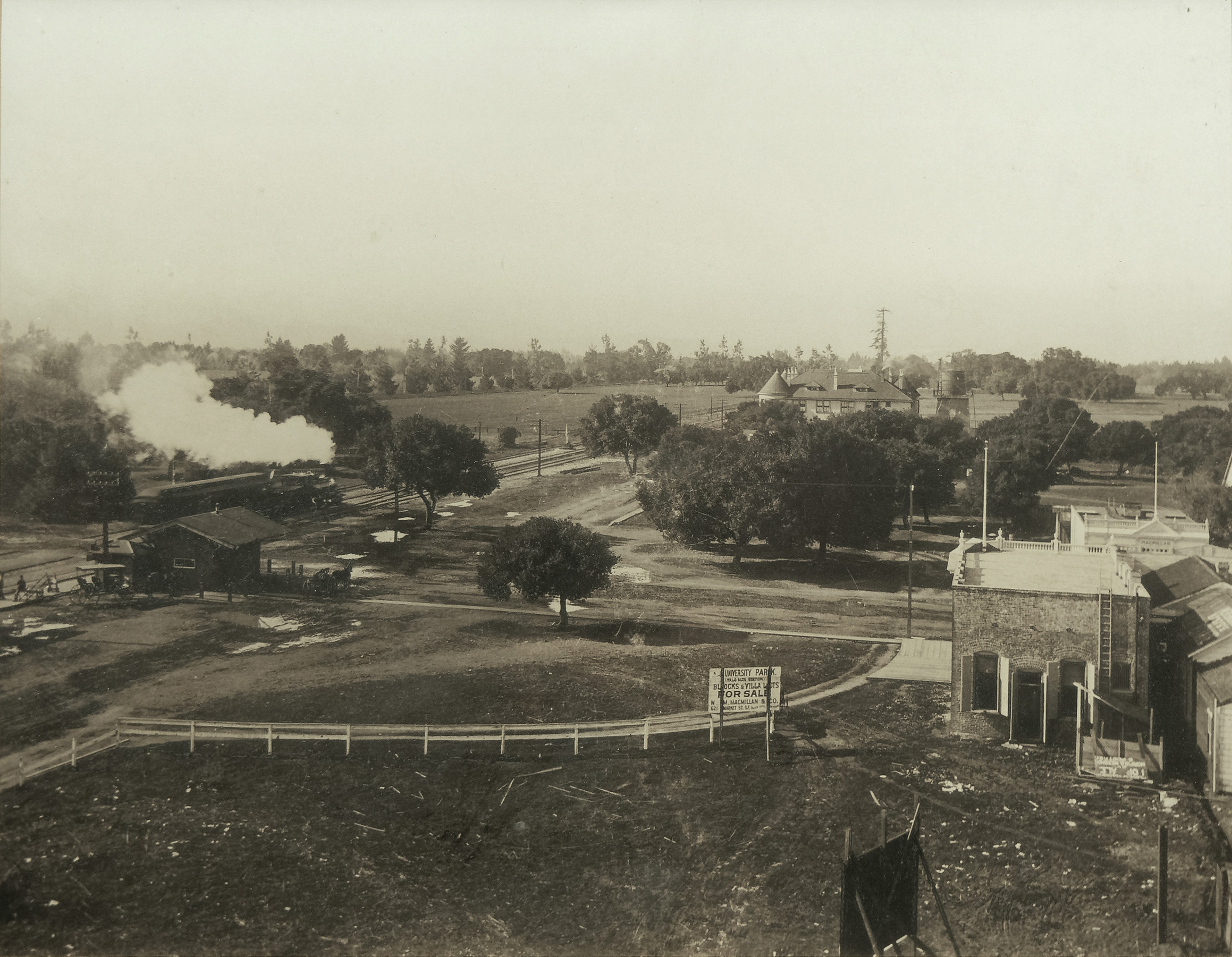
A train at the original station in 1894. Note El Palo Alto, a tall redwood in the upper right.

The San Francisco and San Jose Railroad opened from San Francisco to Mayfield in 1863, and to San Jose the next year. Several decades later, Leland Stanford founded the new town of Palo Alto to the north of Mayfield. Palo Alto station was opened in 1890 to serve the then-newly established Stanford University. A flag stop, the original structure had open sides supported by posts; it was enclosed in 1893 for use as a waiting room. A temporary building for ticket sales, telegraphy, and baggage was constructed between the waiting room and a retrofitted former boxcar. (That boxcar had previously been used as the Los Gatos station, and was later used as the Los Altos station).

A new station, costing $5,500 (equivalent to US$178,000 in 2024), was opened on January 1, 1896. Substantially larger than the previous depot, it had five wooden arches styled after the Richardsonian Romanesque masonry arches of the university campus. The architecturally-plain station was never locally popular, and calls came for its replacement as early as the 1920s. The Peninsular Railway served University Avenue, with a stop in front of the station between 1910 and 1934.

=== Streamline Moderne station ===
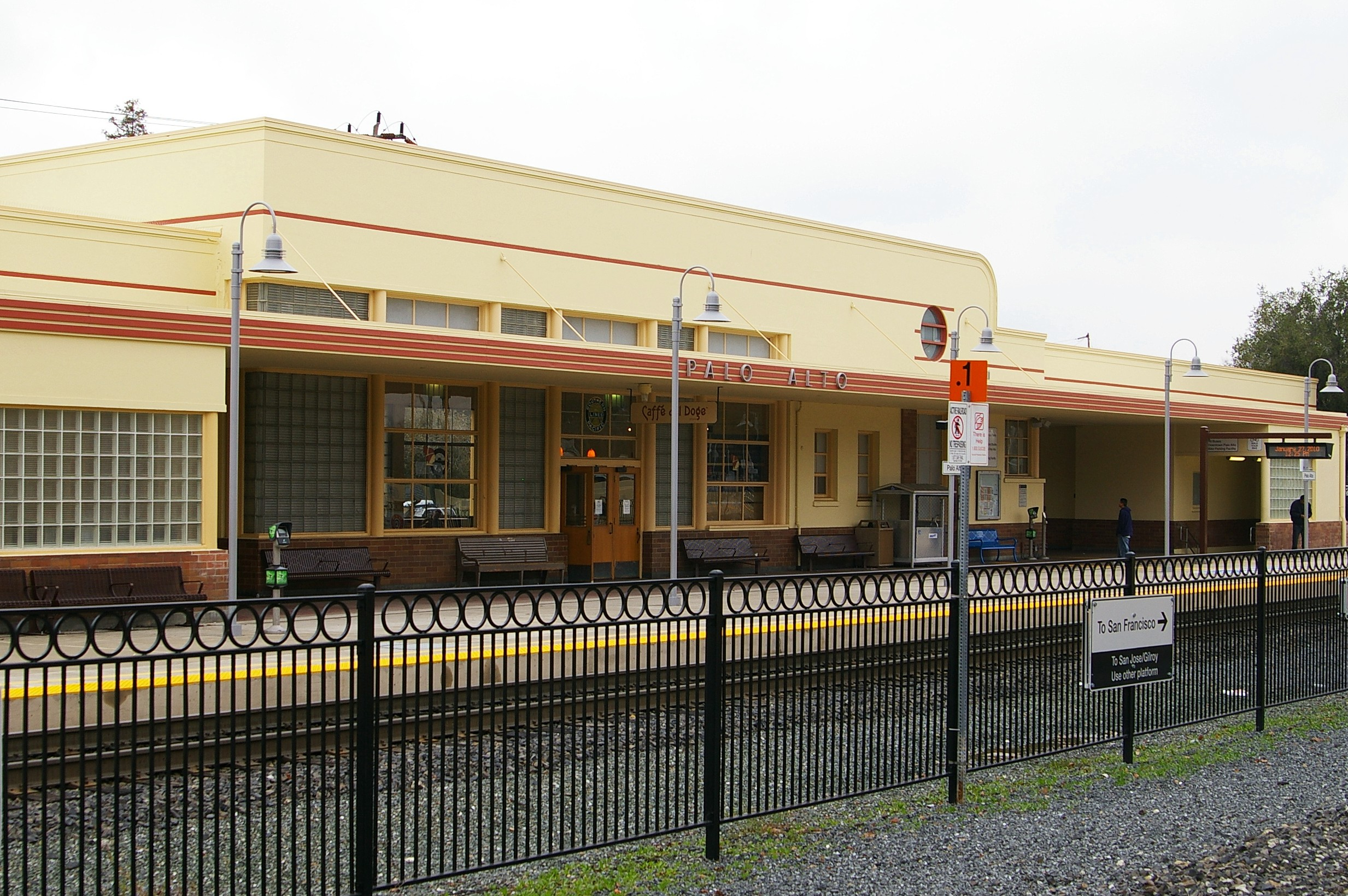
The station building in 2010

In 1939, the Southern Pacific Railroad (SP) began a grade separation project in Palo Alto. The tracks were moved 80 feet (24 m) west and raised 5 feet (1.5 m), with University Avenue lowered under the tracks and Alma Street just south of the station. A temporary station on the east side of the tracks was built in 1939, and the cornerstone for a new station building was laid on October 20, 1940. The new station was opened on January 25, 1941. It was with a parade on March 8, 1941. The whole project cost $700,000 (equivalent to US$11,482,000 in 2024), most of which was paid for by the federal government.

The new station building was constructed in the Streamline Moderne style, in contrast to the earlier Mission Revival and Spanish Colonial Revival buildings in Palo Alto designed by Birge Clark. Designed by SP architect John H. Christie, the building's aesthetics were inspired by the railroad's Daylight series of streamlined passenger trains. The station is 215 feet (66 m) long by 25 feet (7.6 m) wide; it consists of two buildings connected with an arcade facing the tracks and a marquee at the rear. The larger building housed the ticket office and waiting room, with the smaller baggage room to the north. The waiting room contains a 1944 mural by John McQuarrie (who painted murals in several SP stations) showing facts and events in the history of California.

The station's design is typical of the Streamline Moderne movement; it has porthole windows, substantial use of glass blocks, and horizontal "speed lines" on the exterior. A shelter was built on the eastern (northbound) platform; it was later modified with more open ends and larger windows. Three pedestrian underpasses were built: one north of the station building and a pair flanking University Avenue. Although the relocated right-of-way was built to fit four tracks, only three tracks were built; a narrow island platform (typical of SP stations) was located between the western and center tracks. The platforms were 1,400 feet (430 m) long to accommodate longer intercity trains.

=== Modern changes ===
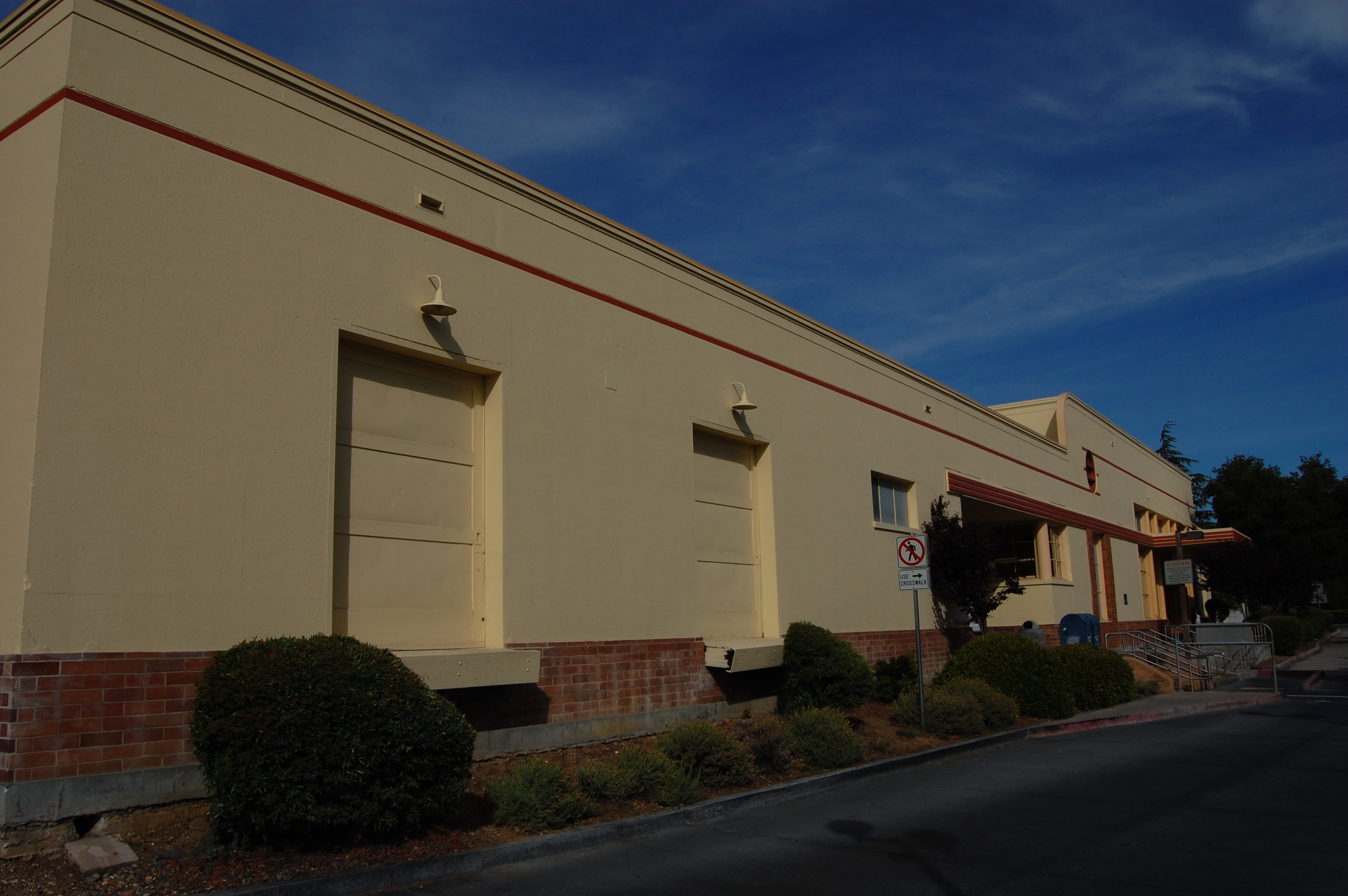
The former baggage room in use as a bike station in 2010

Intercity service to Palo Alto lasted until May 1, 1971, when Amtrak took over service from the private railroads. The San Francisco–Monterey Del Monte was discontinued, while the San Francisco–Los Angeles Coast Daylight was rerouted via Oakland. SP Peninsula Commute local service (renamed Caltrain in 1985) continued to stop at Palo Alto. In 1982, the station building was refurbished and landscaping was added. AC Transit began operating service between Union City station and Palo Alto station over the Dumbarton Bridge – later branded Dumbarton Express – on September 10, 1984. The station was added to the National Register of Historic Places as an example of the Streamline Moderne style on April 18, 1996.

In April 1999, the former baggage building was converted into a free staffed bike station with 80 spaces. It was closed on October 27, 2004, for asbestos removal as part of a $1.2 million renovation of the station buildings. The bicycle station reopened on February 27, 2007, as a paid and unstaffed facility with 96 spaces.

The bus plaza adjacent to the station building was renovated in 2005. From 2008 to 2009, Caltrain constructed the $35 million Palo Alto Stations Improvement Project at the Palo Alto and California Avenue stations. At Palo Alto, the northern underpass was modified to make it accessible, allowing the nearby pedestrian level crossing to be closed. The platforms (shortened significantly since the station was built) were rebuilt and lengthened. New lighting, shelters, and message signs were installed. Palo Alto is the second-busiest Caltrain station after San Francisco, averaging 7,764 weekday boardings by a 2018 count.

=== Future plans ===
A 2007 city report called for additional expansion and renovation of the station area in conjunction with the California High-Speed Rail project. The rail line would be widened to four tracks with two island platforms—an additional northbound track would be built east of the existing northbound platform, and a replacement southbound platform would be built between two southbound tracks. University Avenue would be split into a one-way pair flanking a new city park. The bus plaza would gain a western entrance with direct access to El Camino Real. In 2013, the Santa Clara Valley Transportation Authority proposed relocating the bus plaza onto both sides of University Avenue.

Among the possibilities being considered for eliminating grade crossings in Palo Alto were a viaduct, a trench, and long tunnel under the downtown area. In April 2024, the town narrowed these to a vehicle underpass and a partial raising of the tracks.

== Bus connections ==
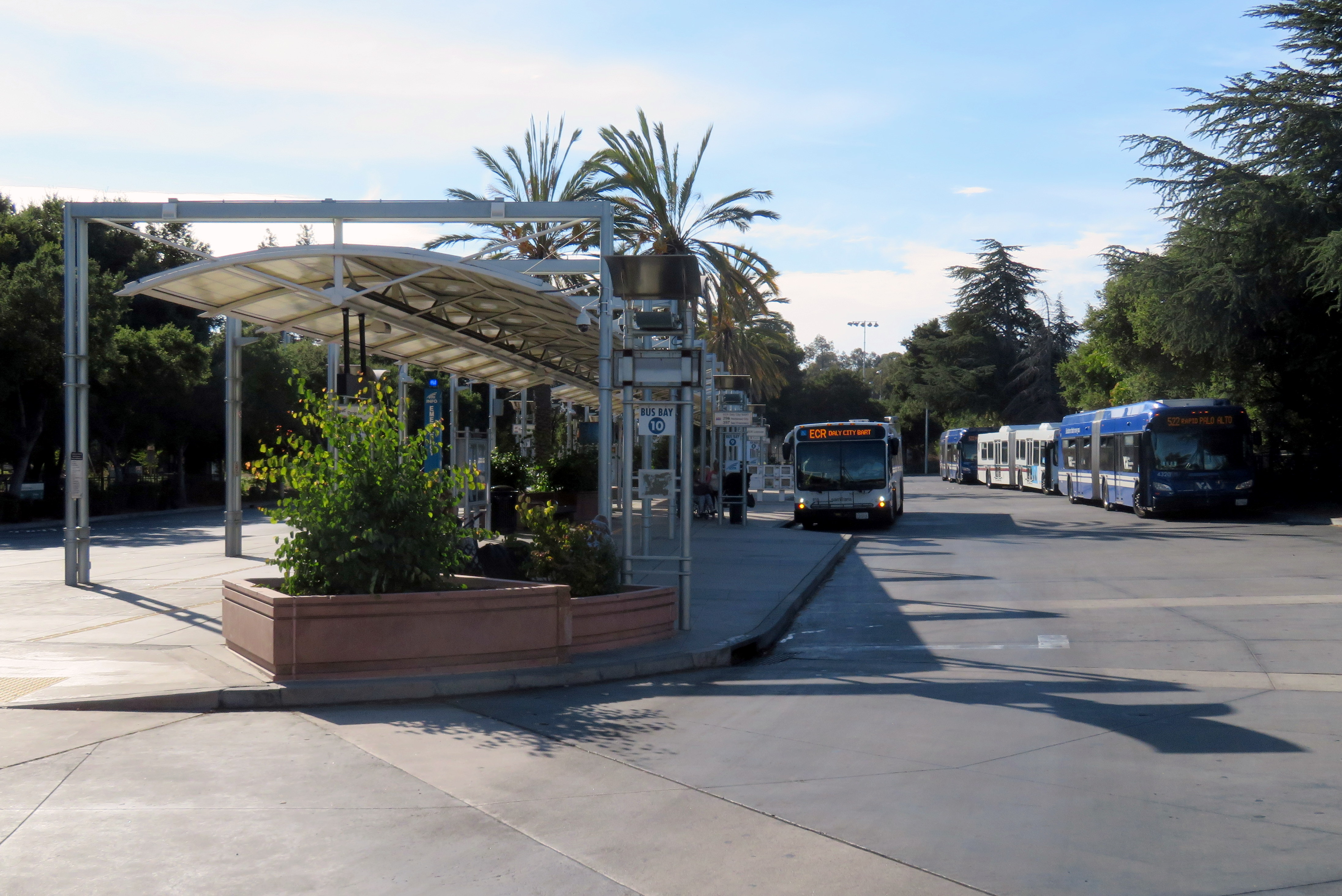
Buses in the main bus plaza in 2018

Palo Alto station is also a major transfer point for regional and local bus systems:

- City of Palo Alto shuttles: Crosstown, Embarcadero
- Dumbarton Express: DB
- East Palo Alto shuttle
- Menlo Park midday shuttle
- Samtrans: ECR, 280, 281, 296, 397
- Santa Clara Valley Transportation Authority: 21, 22, Rapid 522
- Stanford Health Care TECH shuttle
- Stanford Marguerite: MC, N, O, P, RP, S, SE, X, Y

Dumbarton Express, SamTrans, VTA, and some Marguerite buses stop in a bus plaza northwest of the station building (adjacent to the southbound platform). Some Marguerite buses instead stop south of the station building. Most other shuttles and some Marguerite buses stop near the northbound platform.
