= Saratoga and Almaden Railroad =

Overview
- Locale: Santa Clara County, California

Service
- Type: Steam railroad

History
- Planning began: 1884
- Ceased: 1905

Technical
- Track gauge: 1,435 mm (4 ft 8 1/2 in) standard gauge

The Saratoga and Almaden Railroad was a shortlived standard gauge steam railroad in western Santa Clara County that existed in the late 1880s but was gone by 1905. Several miles of the railroad were built, and financial troubles or some unknown reason were the cause of its demise.

== History ==
In 1884, it was planned that a railroad be built from Murphy's station along the Southern Pacific Railroad tracks to Saratoga, with the long-term goal of building a collective 22 miles (35 km) of track in order to reach the mines of New Almaden. At least five miles (8.0 km) of track were laid, and the railroad was likely built from Murphy's station all the way to Saratoga. If this were the case, the name "Saratoga and Almaden Railroad" may have been chosen to garner support for the unbuilt section of the line. Currently, the most identifiable features along the old right of way are a creek channel owned by the Santa Clara Valley Water District and Blaney Road in Cupertino.

== Funding and late history ==
The railroad had at least $200,000 in capital at their disposal, which came at least in part from 150 gold bonds issued around 1885 that were signed by the company president D.M. Pyle and the company secretary. These gold bonds expired twenty years later, but the railroad ran into financial troubles as soon as 1886. Notably, the Southern Pacific Railroad and Peninsular Railway began service on the Mayfield Cutoff in 1908, just three years after the gold bonds expired.
