= Market Street Depot =

Former railway hub in the United States

San Jose
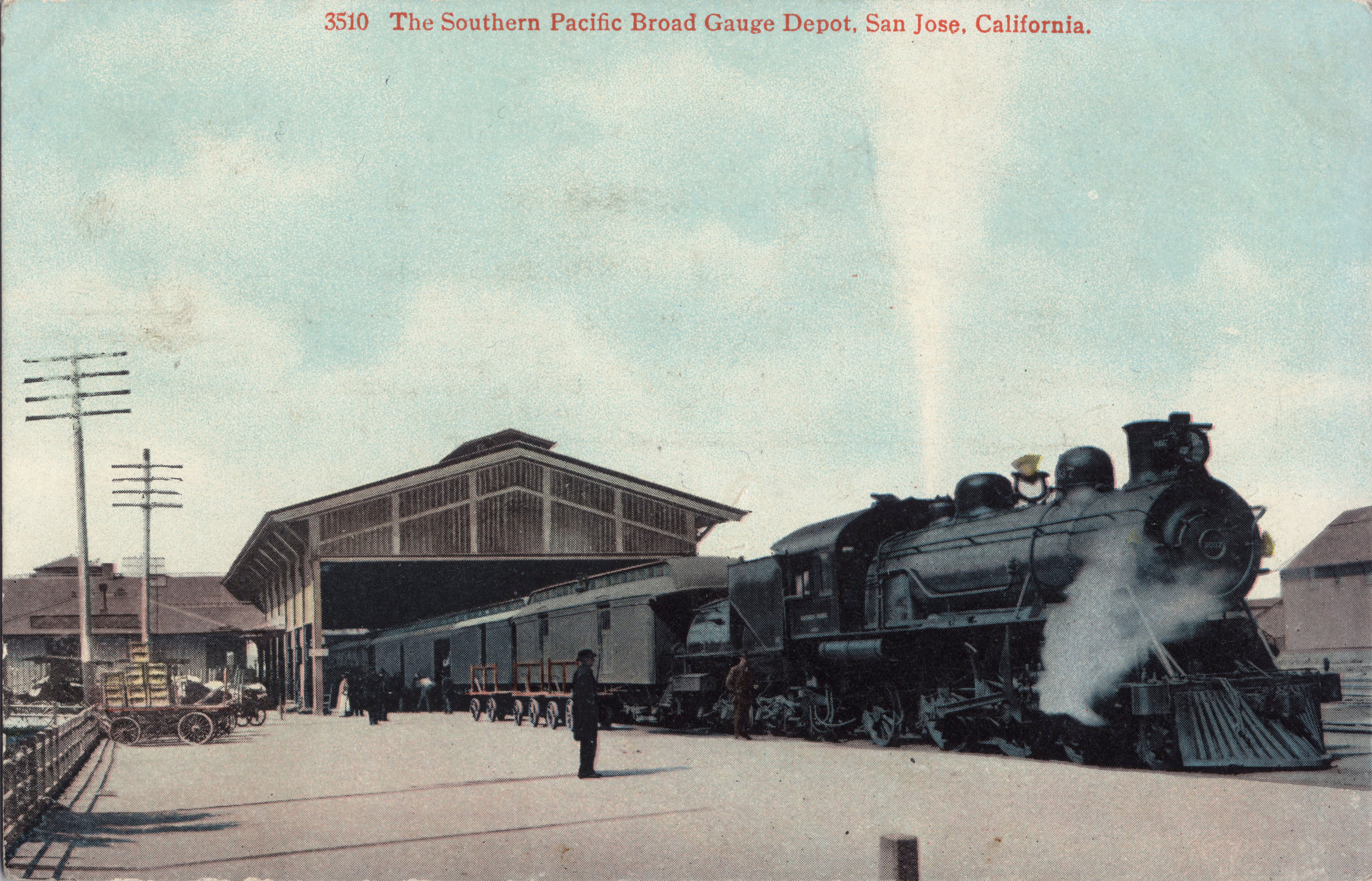
- The Depot depicted on a postcard in 1909

General information
- Location: San Jose, California
- Coordinates: 37.341°N 121.896°W
- Owner: Southern Pacific Railroad
- Line: SP Coast Line

History
- Opened: January 16, 1864
- Closed: December 1935
- Rebuilt: 1883

Former services
Preceding station	Southern Pacific Railroad	Following station
College Park toward San Francisco	Coast Line	San Jose Fourth Street toward Los Angeles
College Park toward San Francisco	Peninsula Commute	Terminus
Milpitas toward Oakland Pier	Oakland – San Jose	Terminus
Peninsular Railway
San Jose Peninsular toward Palo Alto	Palo Alto – Jose	Terminus
San Jose Peninsular toward Los Gatos	Los Gatos – San Jose	Terminus
Location

Market Street Depot was the primary intercity railway station in San Jose, California between 1863 and 1935. It was located at Market and Bassett Streets at the end of the former San Francisco and San Jose Railroad, a route which was later integrated into the Southern Pacific Railroad Coast Line.

== History ==
The San Francisco and San Jose Railroad was completed to San Jose on January 16, 1864. A new station building was constructed in 1883 along with an extension of Market Street. The former San Francisco and San Jose Railroad end of line facilities that accommodated passengers and freight since the road's completion was converted to a freight facility. The Peninsular Railway terminated in front of the station, with service running until 1934.

Completion of the Coast Line to Los Angeles as well as the Bayshore Cutoff near San Francisco greatly increased the rail traffic running through downtown San Jose in the early 1900s — combining the increase in personal automobile use made for greatly increased delays on local streets. As a result, efforts were undertaken by the city to divert the rail line off of Fourth Street. This necessitated extensive grade crossings, new trackage, and a new San Jose depot located at Cahill Street, later named Diridon station. After December 1935, passenger operations were shifted away from the Market Street Depot in favor of the new facility and the tracks on Fourth Street were removed. The passenger facilities were subsequently demolished, but the adjoining freight depot continued service until the mid 1900s.

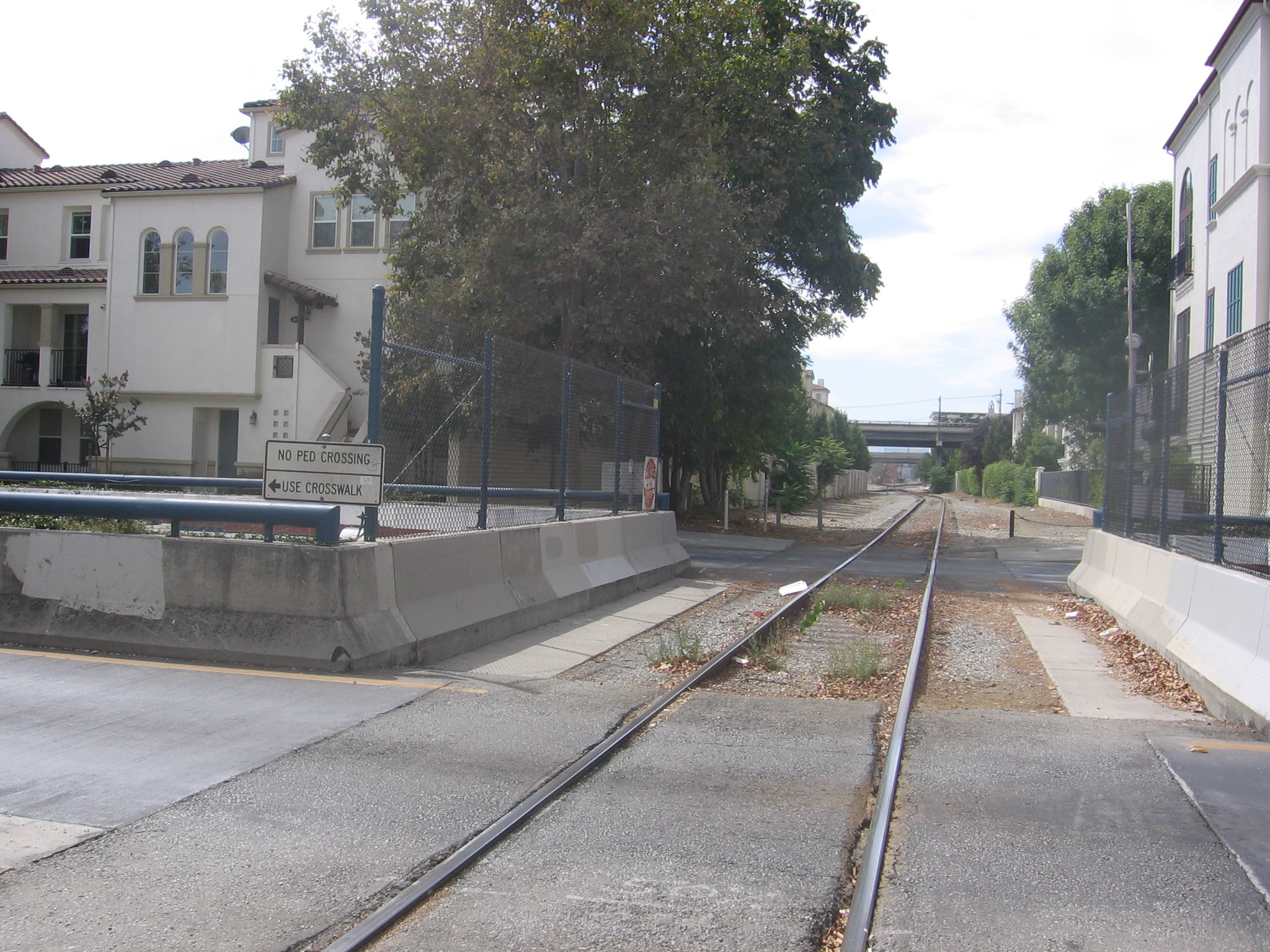
Union Pacific Railroad tracks run beside the site of the former Market Street Depot (apartments left of frame) in 2012. In front is the VTA light rail underpass, built to avoid conflicts with the mainline tracks.
