= Fresno Traction Company =

Historic tram operator

Fresno Traction Company operated electric trams in Fresno, California, from 1903 to 1939. Earlier horsecar tracks were improved and electrified under consolidated ownership which passed to Southern Pacific Transportation Company operation in 1910. A separate Fresno Interurban Railway shared some lines along Fresno city streets.

== Preceding horsecar operations ==
After incorporation of the City of Fresno in 1885, the Fresno Street Railroad began operating horsecars in 1889 from H Street along Mariposa Street, K Street and Tulare Street to the east city limit. The street railway system was later extended to the south city limit along F Street, Santa Clara Avenue, C Street and Elm Avenue. The Fresno City, Belmont, and Yosemite Railroad was granted a separate charter to build a 20-pound T rail line to the north city limit along J Street, Tuolumne Street and O Street. The Fresno Railroad built a 20-pound T rail line along I street to the south city limit, and along Ventura Avenue to the Fresno County fairgrounds. The Fresno City Railway rebuilt these horsecar lines with 11.5 miles (18.5 km) of 61-pound rail in 1901 in preparation for heavier electric streetcars.

== Electrification ==
The Fresno Traction Company was incorporated in 1903 authorized to build 196 miles (315 km) of electric railroads connecting Fresno to Selma, Trimmers Springs, Wawona, Central, and Washington Colonies. Electric operations commenced with three single truck Hammond cars purchased from the United Railroads of San Francisco, and five California cars built by W. L. Holman Car Company. After 4 miles (6.4 km) of new track had been laid, these expansion plans were curtailed by the 1906 San Francisco earthquake. By 1909 the Fresno Avenue subway had been built under the steam railroad line, and lines along Tulare Street, Fresno Avenue, and J Street had been improved with double track. A car barn and repair shop was built at the end of Tulare Street to hold ten new double-truck Paye cars built by American Car Company.

Southern Pacific (SP) purchased a controlling stock interest in 1910 and replaced most of the older rail with heavier 75-pound rail. The Roeding Park branch line was completed in 1912, and four longer Paye cars were purchased from the Jewett Car Company. A line was completed to the company-owned Fresno Beach in 1915. A total of 41.55 miles (66.87 km) of track was in operation when automobile competition halted further expansion after World War I. Power was purchased from San Joaquin Light and Power Corporation at 1000 volt, 60 cycle, 3 phase AC and converted to 550 volt DC in substations at O and Platt Streets, at Herndon and Forkner Avenues, and on Blackstone Avenue near Webster Street. Nineteen Birney cars were placed in operation after the war, and the original Hammond cars were replaced by twelve lightweight double-truck cars built by St. Louis Car Company in 1925. Individual lines were abandoned as service contracted through the 1930s. Southern Pacific announced its intention to replace all remaining service with buses, only to sell the system to National City Lines a few weeks later in March 1939. All streetcar operations ended on May 20, 1939.

== Rolling stock ==
Number	Builder	Type	Date	Length	Notes
1	J. G. Brill Company	Box motor	1903	30 ft	Four 50 horsepower (37 kW) motors
2-9	Hammond	double-truck California cars	1903	30 ft	all retired by 1926
10-12	Hammond	single-truck California cars	1896	28 ft	built for United Railroads of San Francisco; purchased 1904
14-16	Stockton	Open trailers	1888		former horsecars converted 1902-3; scrapped before 1920
17-21	W. L. Holman Car Company	double-truck California cars	1906	32 ft	rebuilt into Pay-As-You-Enter (PAYE) cars before 1920
22-24	Stockton	Open trailers	1888		former horsecars converted 1902-3; scrapped before 1920
25-34	American Car Company	PAYE double-truck California cars	1909	37 ft 2 in	retired 1933
41-44	Jewett	PAYE double-truck California cars	1912	42 ft 8 in	40 seats; became Peninsular Railway #70-73
51-54	J. G. Brill Company	double-truck low-floor trams	1913	44 ft	scrapped 1932
59-60	St. Louis Car Company	Birneys	1920	28 ft	32 seats; built for Stockton Electric; purchased 1924
61-77	American Car Company	Birneys	1919	28 ft	32 seats; #61-66 to Stockton Electric in 1939
81-92	St. Louis Car Company	double-truck	1925	42 ft 5 in	36 seats; #81-83 to Pacific Electric #150-152 in 1933; #84-92 to Central California Traction Company in 1939

== Fresno Interurban ==
The Fresno Interurban Railway was incorporated in 1914 to build a 26-mile (42 km) electric railway from Fresno to Clovis, California. Construction of that line proceeded slowly eastward from Fresno with a Hall-Scott gasoline motor car providing service over the completed portion. The 100 horsepower (75 kW) Hall-Scott car #1 seated 43 passengers. While construction of the line to Clovis was underway, an electrified branch line was put in operation between J Street and Fresno State College with two 48-passenger cars (#102 & #103) leased from the Peninsular Railway. When the Hall-Scott car broke down in September 1917, Santa Fe Railroad #2157 0-6-0 was leased to continue service over the main line. Passenger service to Fresno State College ended when the interurban declared bankruptcy in 1918; and Santa Fe purchased the company in 1922. The incomplete line toward Clovis was improved in 1924 to serve as a freight branch of the Santa Fe Railroad.
