= Fresno Chaffee Zoo =

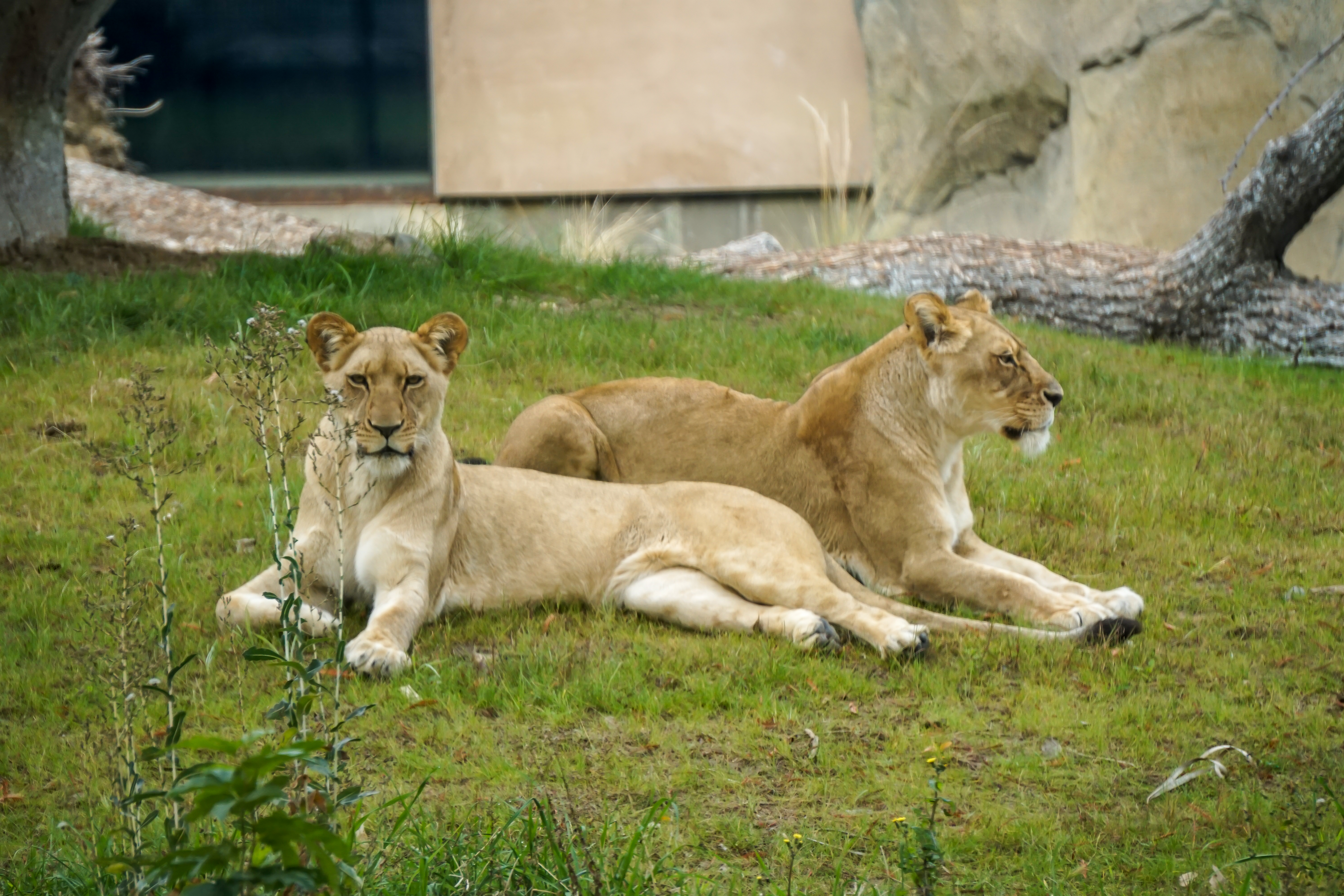
- Interactive map of Fresno Chaffee Zoo
- 36.7522°N 119.8215°W
- Date opened: 1929
- Location: Fresno, California, United States
- Land area: 39 acres (16 ha)
- Annual visitors: 834,000
- Memberships: AZA, WAZA
- Major exhibits: African Adventure, Roo Walkabout, Stingray Bay, Sunda Forest, Tropical Rain Forest, Valley Farm
- Website: fresnochaffeezoo.org

The Fresno Chaffee Zoo is a zoo in Roeding Park in Fresno, California covering 39 acres and housing over 190 species. Its attractions include Stingray Bay, Dino Dig, Valley Farm, Sea Lion Cove, African Adventure, and Ross Laird's Winged Wonders Bird Show. The zoo is accredited by the Association of Zoos and Aquariums (AZA) and is a member of the World Association of Zoos and Aquariums (WAZA).

== History ==
=== Early history ===
The zoo was formed some time around 1908. The earliest zoo record describes a collection consisting of two bears and around fifty birds of various species. According to the zoo's website, "bears, local cats, hoofstock, and birds were added to the Zoo and housed in log cabin type exhibits." The Association of Zoos and Aquariums (AZA) officially recognized the park opening in 1929 as the Roeding Park Zoo. Only few animals were seen, but that number would later rise. The year attendance was around 2,000 and most of the visitors were from Fresno and the surrounding areas.

=== 1940–1960 ===
The zoo grew substantially in the 1940s and 1950s, with 100 animals and more birds by 1947. The zoo's first foreman, Eldon "Curly" Blocker, was hired from the San Diego Zoo. In 1949, the zoo's Asian elephant Nosey (a name determined by a citywide "Name-the-Elephant" Contest) was acquired, with help from the Fresno Rotary Club. Her arrival coincided with Fresno's "49ers Days Rodeo Parade", and Nosey's presence in that parade was popular enough to spawn the creation of the Fresno Zoological Society, which would create interest in the zoo and provide a fundraising mechanism. In the 1950s, ten large exhibits were added to the zoo grounds with monkeys, sea lions, camels, giraffes, an African bird aviary, a flamingo habitat, and on-site feed and medical compounds. The zoo became an institutional member of the AZA in 1957. In 1965 Paul S. Chaffee was hired as the zoo's first director. In the late 1960s, the animal exhibits were renovated, with climate control being added to increase the comfort of the animals. In 1967, the large bird of prey exhibit was constructed, and in 1968, a master plan for future development was drafted.

=== 1970–1990 ===
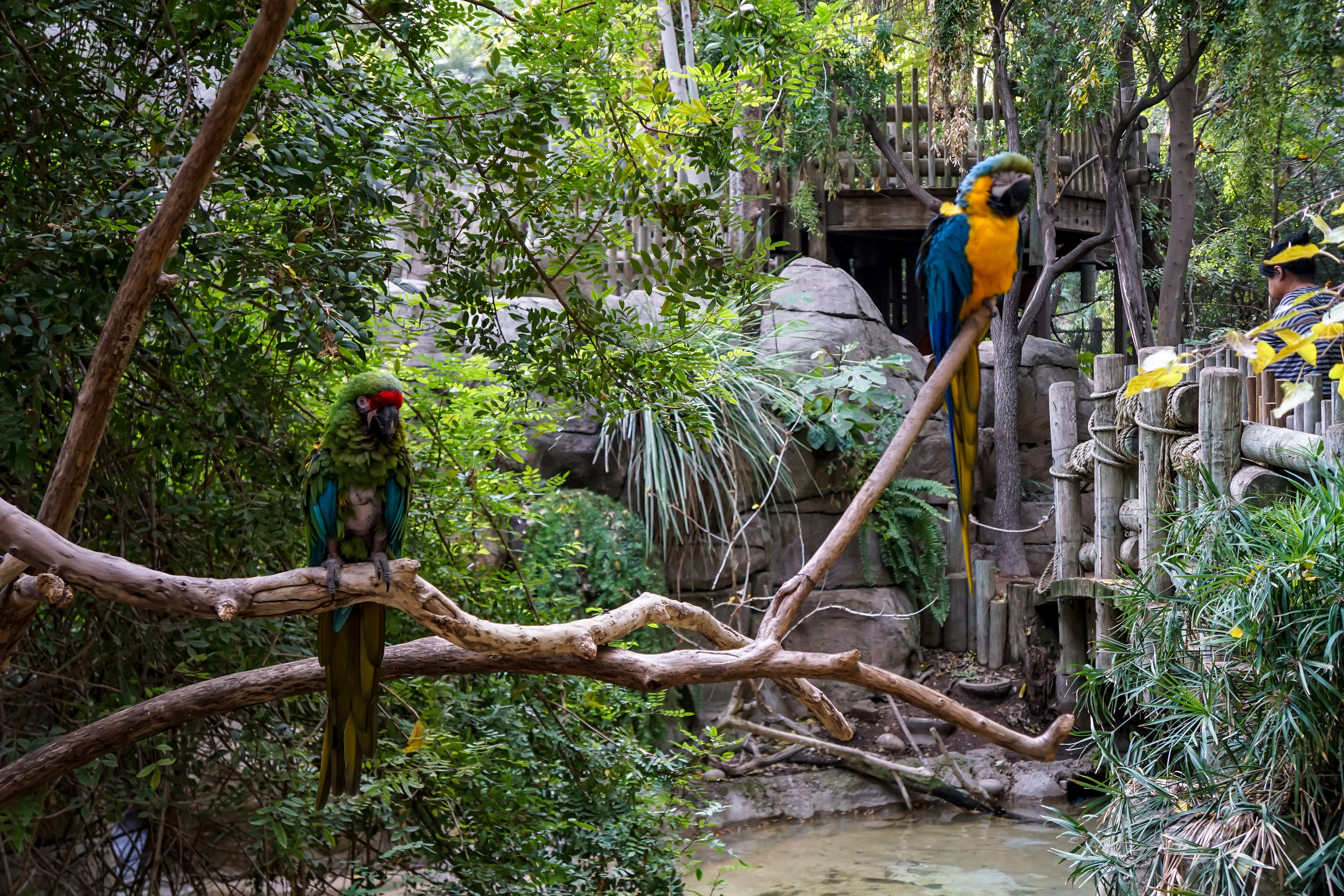
Colorful tropical birds in the rain forest exhibit

The zoo's area expanded by a third, and new exhibits featuring bison, elk, and prairie dogs were added. In 1976, in honor of the American Bicentennial Celebration, the park's grizzly bear facility was expanded. In 1978, the Park Zoo Trust Fund (distinct from the Zoo Admissions Trust Fund) was established to make sure a portion of concession sales were used to improve the zoo. This freed the zoo from having to approve a budget with the City Council. In 1979, the zoo added the Edward A. Kane Reptile House, the world's first computer-controlled reptile habitat.

In 1982, Nosey the Elephant's habitat was renovated and three new elephants were brought in. A red wolf exhibit known as Wolf Woods was added in 1984, and the Doris and Karl Falk Wildlife Education Center was completed, becoming part of the zoo's Educational Center. In 1985, the zoo's name changed from the Roeding Park Zoo to the Fresno Zoo. In 1988, the zoo's walk-through rainforest exhibit was added. 1989 saw the addition of a large classroom wing, and the implementation of the Adopt-an-Animal fundraising program. Paul S. Chaffee, the zoo's director since 1965, died in 1990, and the Fresno Zoo was renamed the Chaffee Zoological Gardens of Fresno in his honor. In 1993, Nosey the elephant died at the age of 47.

=== 2000–present ===
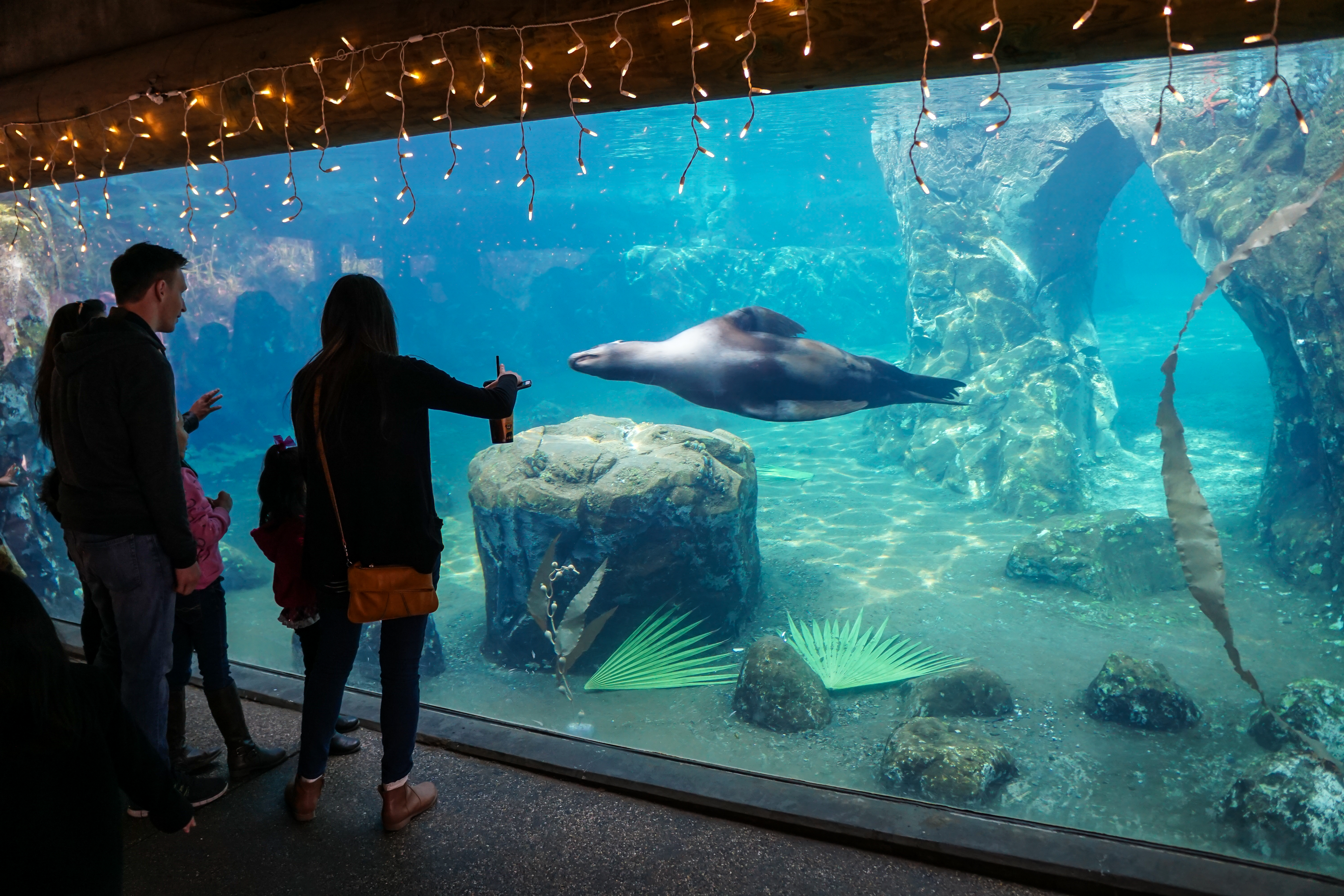
The underwater viewing area at Sea Lion Cove

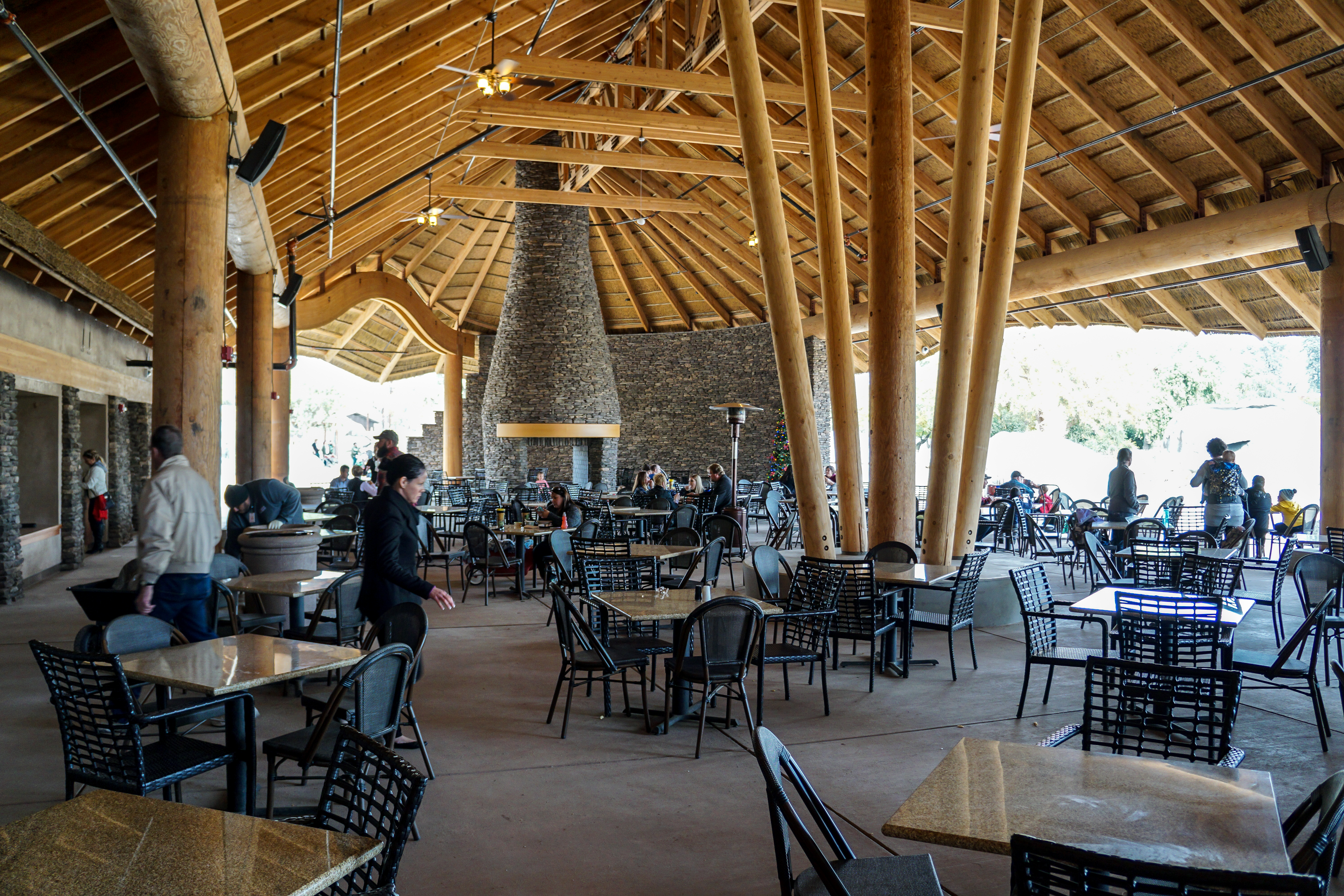
The Kopje Lodge, part of the new African Adventure exhibit

In 2004, "Measure Z" was passed by the voters (73%) in Fresno to raise money to expand the zoo, and to improve the animal exhibits. The US$150 million project was contingent upon the submission and review of an environmental impact report. The name of the zoo was shortened to Fresno Chaffee Zoo in 2006. In 2007, a traveling "Stingray Bay" exhibit visited and attracted large crowds. Several stingrays were bred while they were visiting Fresno. In 2009, a permanent Stingray Bay exhibit was opened, funded by Measure Z. In the rain forest exhibit, the former butterfly house (Maddis House) reopened as the Tropical Treasures exhibit in March 2009, with poison dart frogs and a sloth among other species.

In August 2012, a very large Sea Lion Cove, designed after the Central Coast's Point Lobos, was opened. It contains 250,000 gallon saltwater tank with rock outcrops and islands, while preserving the redwood trees that surround the enclosures. A 35-ft viewing glass allows guest to watch the sea lions underwater. This exhibit also includes brown pelicans. This was the first major exhibit funded by Measure Z. The old sea lion enclosure was repurposed for river otters.

In January 2014, ground was broken for the approximately 18-acre "African Adventure" expansion doubling the size of the zoo and including large animal exhibits such as lions, breeding elephants, cheetahs, rhinos, and meerkats. Measure Z, which provided funding for capital zoo projects, was renewed by voters in November 2014.

On October 15, 2015, phase one of African Adventure opened. The 13 acre exhibit is home to over 100 animals including lions, African elephants, cheetahs, White rhinoceroses, meerkats, giraffes, ostriches, and several antelope and birds. In 2016, the zoo opened the "Roo Walkabout", an Australian walk-through exhibit which features red kangaroos, emus and kookaburras. That year set a new attendance record with just under 1 million visitors.

While no major new exhibits opened in 2017, May 2018 saw the debut of a new children's water attraction named "Wilderness Falls". This new play area was designed to allow younger guests to "cool off and make a splash in the waterfall, follow the footprints and explore the wilderness, and discover the fire lookout tower." Work also began in late 2018 and wrapped up in late 2019 on an infrastructure project designed to enable future zoo expansion, including the forthcoming "Kingdoms of Asia" project, as well as a new warthog and tortoise exhibit. The warthog/tortoise exhibit opened in African Adventure in June 2019.

The zoo was closed for approximately three months during the spring of 2020 due to COVID-19. Despite the closure, planning and design was completed in mid-2020 for the Kingdoms of Asia exhibit, and the zoo officially broke ground on the new exhibit on September 24 of that year. This new themed area, which will repurpose and renovate existing exhibits, has been billed as an "immersive southeast Asian forest", including a large area "themed after aspects of Ta Prohm, Angkor, Cambodia". The new exhibit will include habitats for "the Malayan Tiger, Orangutans, Asian small-clawed otter, and Sloth Bear, song birds, bats, and more".

== Exhibits ==
=== Kingdoms of Asia ===
The "Kingdom of Asia" exhibit opened in 2023, and features tigers, orangutans, and other Asian species.
