= Mariano Castro (Californio) =

Californian rancher (1784–1857)

Mariano Castro was a 19th-century Californio landowner and member of one of the prominent ranching families in Mexican-era and early American California. Known for his connection to several historic land grants, he played a notable role in the region's social and economic life during a period of significant political transition.

== Life ==
Mariano Castro was born in the area that is now San Francisco, California, in 1784. He married Maria Trinidad Peralta, and together they were the parents to eight children. Maria died in Santa Clara, California, on December 25, 1872.

Before establishing a farm in the area that later became Mountain View, California, he was a Spanish soldier who participated in the mission-founding trek started by Father Junípero Serra. Mariano Castro may have been a Spaniard of European descent, or he may have been a Native Californian whose family had been Hispanicized. With either family history, Mariano Castro would be considered a Californio. During the 18th and 19th centuries, 21 missions were built from San Diego to Sonoma. Four military presidios and three civilian settlements were also built. The Spanish crown did not wish to pay the expenses of its Alta California settlers, so they learned to become self-sufficient.

In the early 19th century, he moved to San Jose, where he held the office of Alcalde in approximately 1827, possibly into the 1830s. During this time, he also served as judge for the small pueblo, giving his oath of office on a small crucifix allegedly owned by Junípero Serra. In 1833, control of mission land was turned over to the state and parish priests by Mexican authorities. After the death of his daughter and son-in-law, in 1844 and 1845, respectively, he inherited the title to mission land that encompassed what is now Mountain View and Sunnyvale, California. His land grant was called Rancho Pastoria de las Borregas. In addition to being a local activist and raising cattle, Mariano Castro ranched in that area until his 1857 death in San Jose.

== Children ==
=== Inez Castro ===
Inez Castro and her husband, Francisco Estrada, were the original owners of the Rancho Pastoria de las Borregas land grant. This land was granted to Francisco by Governor Juan Alvarado in 1842. After their early deaths (Inez in 1844 and Francisco in 1845), the land passed to Inez's father, Mariano, because the couple had no heirs.

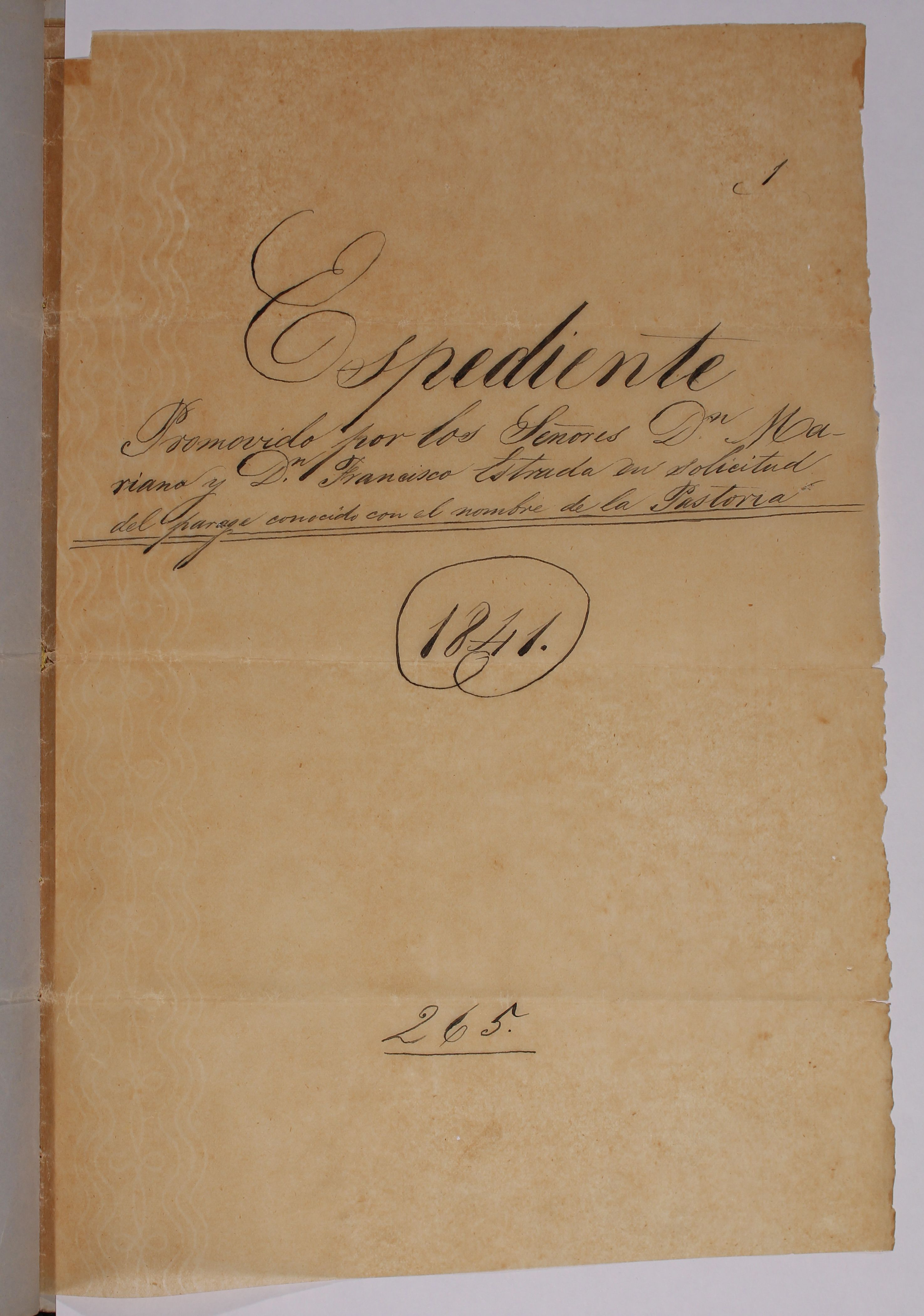
Title Page of Rancho Pastoria de las Borregas Land Grant, 1841

Inez and Francisco built the first permanent residence known in the area that is now Mountain View. In the early 1840s, they built a small adobe house. In about 1850, Mariano replaced the small adobe with a large, new house built combining adobe and wood construction. Although the house no longer exists, its location between Central Expressway and Rengstorff Avenue is marked by a Mountain View Historical Society marker.

=== Crisanto Castro ===
Crisanto was the youngest of the eight children of Mariano and Maria Trinidad (Peralta) Castro. He was born in the old Spanish Mission of San José, California, on 15 August 1828. He died at Castro Station on 9 April 1912. During his life, he lived under the flags of Spain, Mexico, and the United States, all the while never moving from the area. He was educated in private subscription schools in San Jose until he was old enough to engage in farming. In 1857, he married Miss Francisca Armijo, also from San Jose. They had nine children together: Mariano, Merced, Susie, Andrew, Joseph, Willie, Frank, Roque, and Chrisanto. Crisanto inherited his father's farm, which later made up a large part of the city of Mountain View, California.

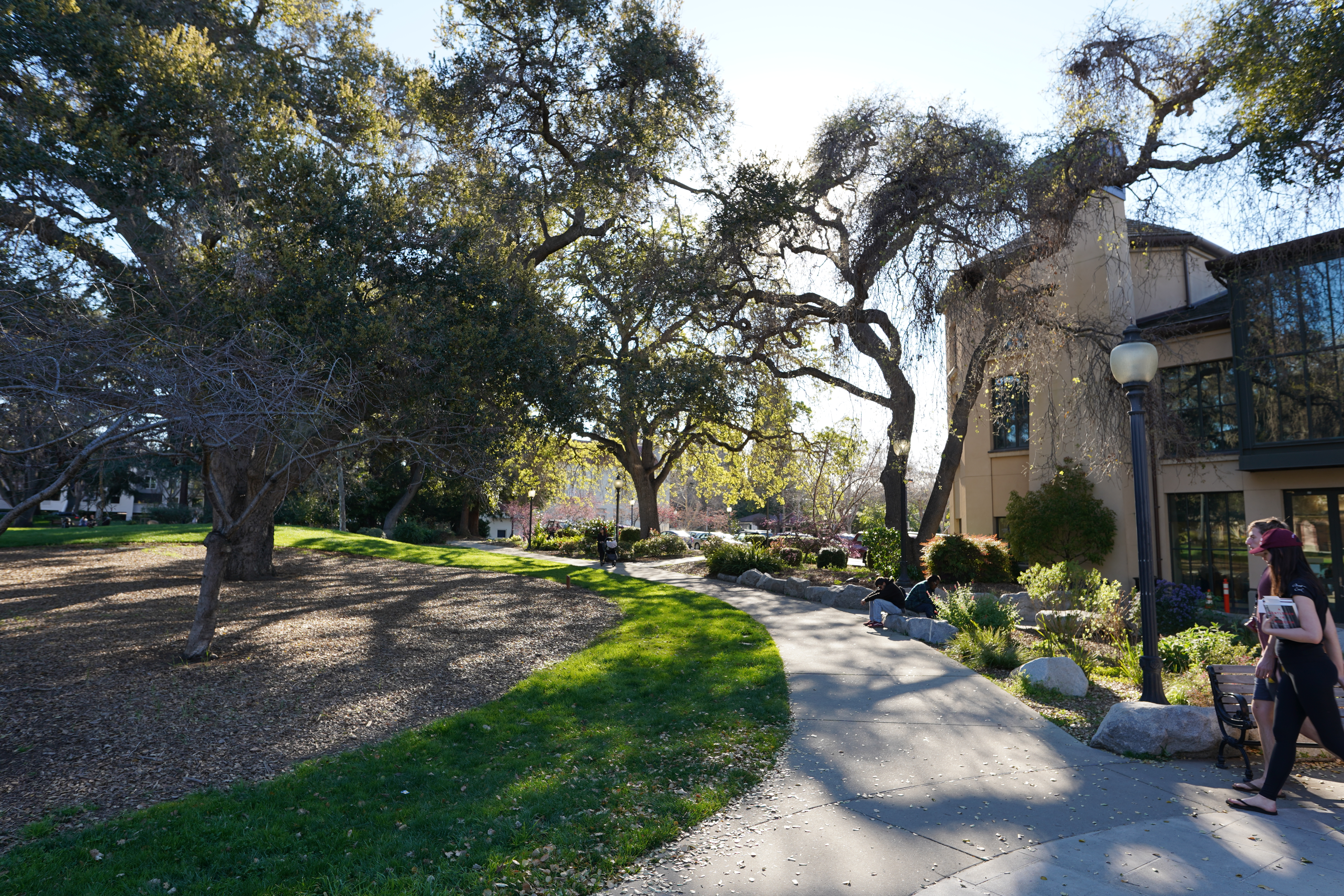
Pioneer Memorial Park, located behind the Mountain View Public Library. This park was used as a cemetery prior to the construction of the library.

Crisanto Castro donated the land for the public schools at Mountain View, as well as St. Joseph's Catholic Church. His mother, Maria, donated land for the first Protestant Church and for an all-denominational burial ground later called Mountain View Cemetery in 1861. This burial ground is now Pioneer Memorial Park, located behind the Mountain View Public Library. Castro Street in downtown Mountain View is named after Crisanto. Crisanto also named other streets in Mountain View after members of his family. These streets include Mercy, Calderon, and Crisanto.

=== Maria Angela Castro ===
Maria Angela Castro was born at Mission San José on 20 October 1817. She was the fourth child born to Mariano and Maria Peralta Castro. Like her brother, Crisanto, Maria Angela inherited a portion of the land grant Rancho Pastoria de las Borregas. In 1899, Maria Angela sued Crisanto, accusing him of defrauding her of $55,000 in property and rental income. The suit alleged that Crisanto had induced her to deed the property to him in trust, but that her brother in fact placed the deeds on record and took all of the income she should have gained off of her land. She died in San Francisco on 4 November 1902, at which point the lawsuit was still ongoing.

== Land history and disputes ==
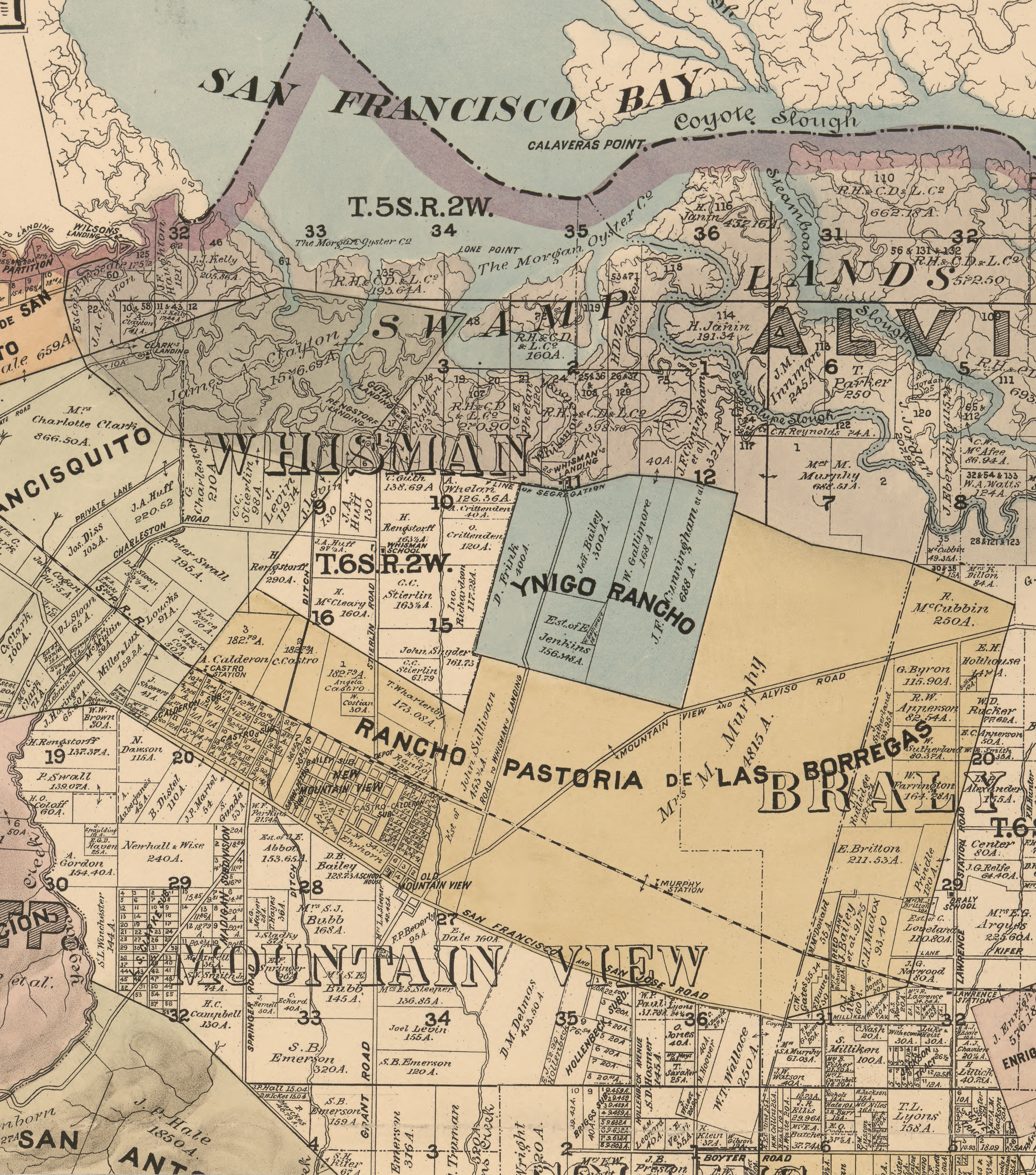
A map of Mountain View created circa 1890. Note Rancho Pastoria de las Borregas detailed on the map.

The majority of the land in the southern portion of San Francisco Bay was claimed by Mission Santa Clara de Asís. In 1821, Mexico gained independence from Spain and thus gained control of Alta California. Mission land was then secularized in 1833, and began to be granted to Californio families.

As a land owner of at least partial Spanish ancestry, Mariano Castro would have had some status in Californio society. Two roads ran through his land, connecting San Francisco (Yerba Buena at the time) and San José. These were the Camino Antiguo Verano (also known as the Lower San Francisco Road) and El Camino Real.

In approximately 1847, George and Sarah Harlan leased land from Mariano Castro and established California's first wayside inn, Fremont House. In 1848, George Harlan was caught up in the excitement of the gold rush and went to see if gold mining would be profitable for him. They sold Fremont House to James Lynn, who in turn sold it to Cyrus Saunders. Saunders worked the in for a couple years before defaulting and declaring bankruptcy. The Santa Clara County district court ordered Saunders to pay Mariano Castro $700.

The text of the California Land Act of 1851 as put forth by the United States Congress.

Like many other Californios, Mariano Castro was affected by the California Land Act of 1851. He was required to prove the legitimacy of his claim to the U.S. Land Grant Commission. In the chaos following, squatters and other individuals attempted to claim parts of Castro's land. Some succeeded, others didn't. The land was whittled down as some of it was sold to pay for legal fees. Often, decisions took years to go through. The Castros fought in court to keep their land from 1852 to 1871. Despite their efforts, the majority of their land was lost to squatters, lawsuits, and legal fees.

In 1855, just two years before Mariano Castro's death, a suit was brought against him for land in Santa Clara County by José Noriega. One of Mariano Castro's relatives, Manuel Castro, had fraudulently granted four leagues of land to Noriega in 1845. Noriega's claim was rejected. The basis for this rejection was that Manuel Castro did not have the authority to make grants at the time that the grant was made.

In 1864, the Castro family granted the railroad a right of way in exchange for the company maintaining a flag stop for them. This flag stop later became Castro Station.

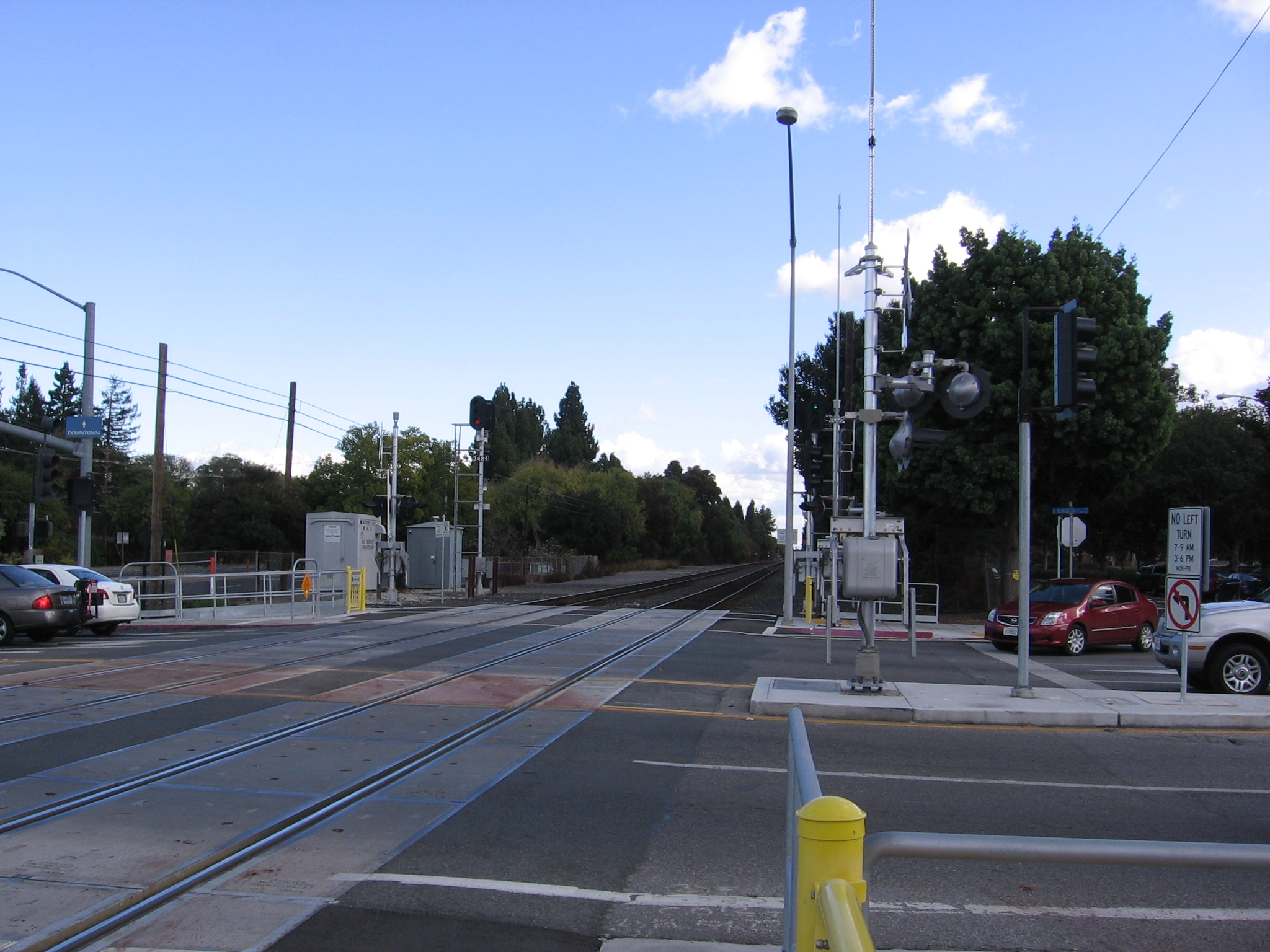
The site of the former Castro Station in 2012. This station was rendered unnecessary by the opening of the newer San Antonio Station 0.8 miles to the north.

In 1885, a man by the name of John A. Benson made a claim that Mariano Castro's land, now in the possession of his son, Crisanto, was in the possession of the government and was available for land claims. This claim was false and threw the land offices in the Santa Clara County area into disarray. This debacle necessitated the government's publishing of a detailed notice in the San Francisco Chronicle. The article described Benson's claims, then proceeded to actual land owners and the history of the land's sale in detail. Although some of the land had been split, this was due to the Castro family selling half of their land grant to Martin Murphy, Jr. in 1849. However, the deeds and sale documents had been filed with the land office, so the Murphy and Castro families had quite provable claims to their land.

The Castro family stayed in Mountain View until 1958, at which point they sold the land they had left to the city.

== Places named after the Castros ==
- Mariano Castro Elementary School (Mountain View, California)
- Castro Street (Mountain View, California) – the main thoroughfare of the downtown area of the city.
- Castro Station (former) – replaced by San Antonio Station in 1999.
