= California Avenue station =

Train station in Palo Alto, California, U.S.

California Avenue
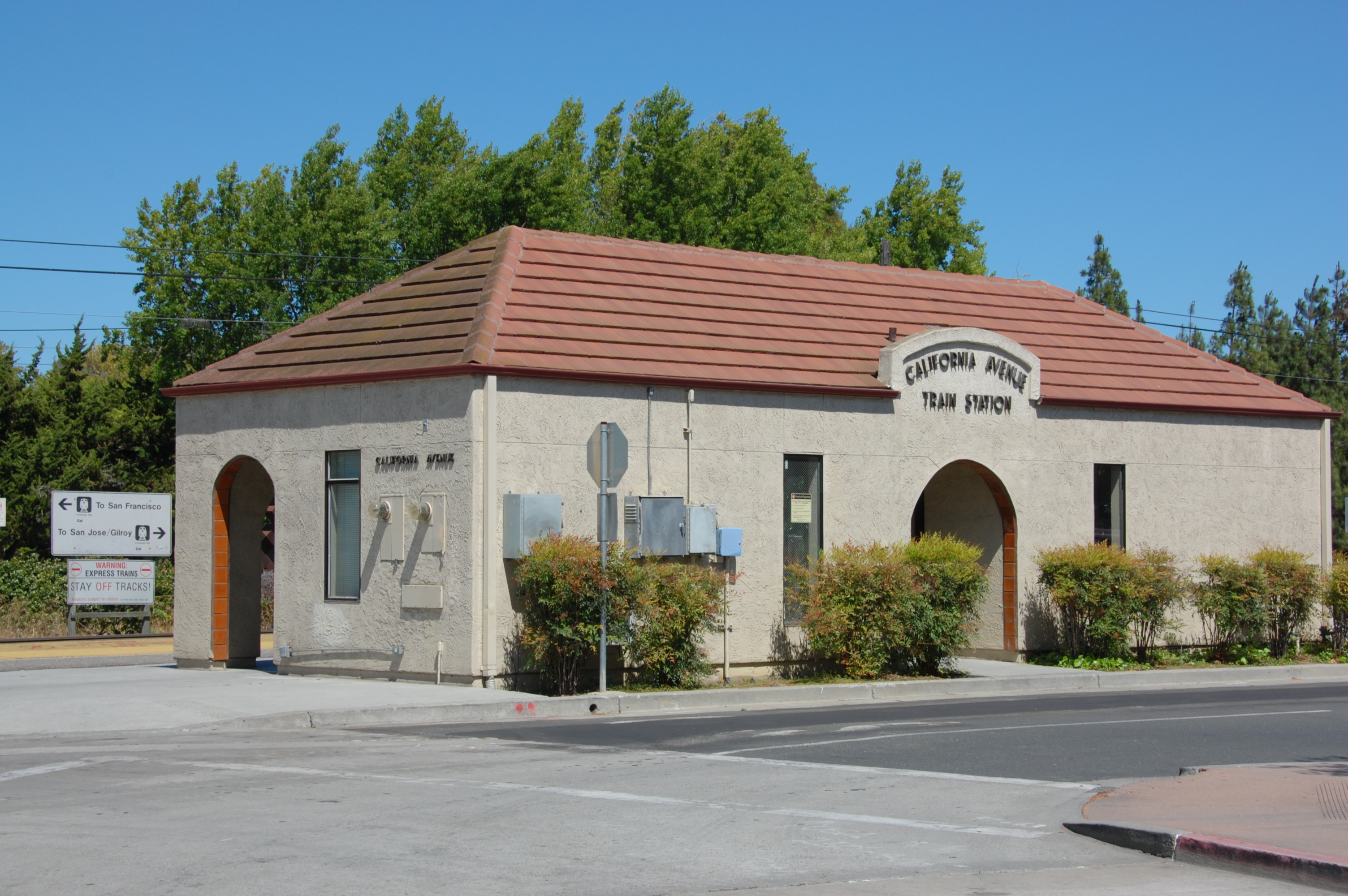
- Shelter at California Avenue station in 2007

General information
- Location: 101 California Avenue; Palo Alto, California
- Coordinates: 37°25′44″N 122°08′29″W
- Owner: Peninsula Corridor Joint Powers Board (PCJPB)
- Line: PCJPB Peninsula Subdivision
- Platforms: 2 side platforms
- Tracks: 2
- Connections: Dumbarton Express: DB1; VTA: 22, 89, Rapid 522

Construction
- Parking: 185 spaces; paid
- Cycle facilities: 33 racks, lockers
- Accessible: Yes

Other information
- Fare zone: 3

History
- Opened: October 18, 1863
- Rebuilt: 1869, 1955, 1983, 2008
- Former names: Mayfield
- Original company: Southern Pacific

Passengers
- FY 2025: 817 (weekday avg.) ▲78%

Services
Preceding station	Caltrain	Following station
Palo Alto toward San Francisco	Local	San Antonio toward San Jose Diridon or Tamien
Palo Alto toward San Francisco	Limited	San Antonio toward San Jose Diridon
Stanford (select trains on game days) toward San Francisco	Weekend Local	San Antonio toward San Jose Diridon or Tamien
Palo Alto toward San Francisco	Weekend Local	San Antonio toward San Jose Diridon or Tamien
Express does not stop here
Former services
Preceding station	Caltrain	Following station
Palo Alto toward San Francisco	Local (L1)	San Antonio toward San Jose Diridon or Tamien
Palo Alto toward San Francisco	Weekend Local (L2)	San Antonio toward San Jose Diridon or Tamien
Stanford (select trains on game days) toward San Francisco	Weekend Local (L2)	San Antonio toward San Jose Diridon or Tamien
Palo Alto toward San Francisco	Limited (L3)	San Antonio toward San Jose Diridon, Tamien or Gilroy
Preceding station	Southern Pacific Railroad	Following station
Palo Alto toward San Francisco	Coast Line	Mountain View toward Los Angeles
Palo Alto toward San Francisco	Peninsula Commute	Castro toward San Jose
Palo Alto toward San Francisco	Peninsula Commute Mayfield Cutoff	Los Altos toward Los Gatos
Location

California Avenue station is a Caltrain station located in Palo Alto, California. It stops at the historical town center of Mayfield, which was annexed by the town of Palo Alto in 1925. The current station structure was built in 1983 and the station was expanded from one platform to two in 2008.

== History ==
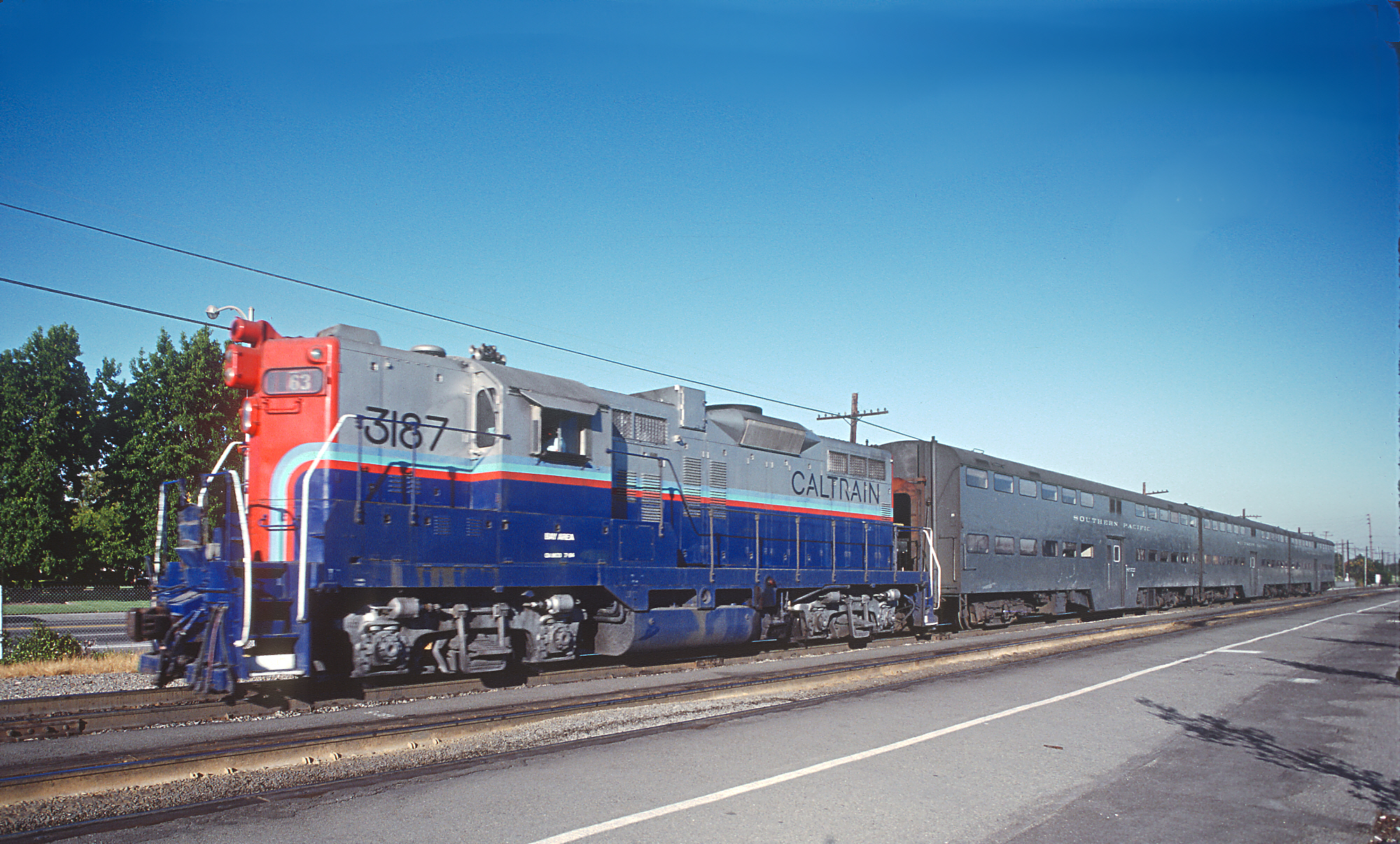
Peninsula Commute train at California Avenue station in 1984

Regular rail service to Mayfield from San Francisco began on October 18, 1863; until January 1864 passengers had to transfer to a stagecoach to continue to San Jose. The first station was approximately half a mile northwest of the current site; it was relocated two years later after residents complained the location was inconvenient and William Paul, a storekeeper and benefactor of the town, donated land on what was then Lincoln Street. The station built in 1869 was replaced in 1955, and again in 1983 in conjunction with the development of the nearby Palo Alto Central condominium complex. After Palo Alto annexed Mayfield in 1925, Lincoln Street was renamed to California Avenue because Palo Alto already had a Lincoln Street; the station took that name in 1941.

Until 2008, the station had a central boarding platform and could only accommodate one train at a time, necessitating a hold-out rule. That year the station was reconfigured to have two outside platforms and a pedestrian underpass replaced the former at-grade crossing, eliminating the need for the hold-out rule. A fence between the tracks helps keep passengers off the tracks. A ticket vending machine is located at the entrance to the pedestrian underpass so that people can buy or validate their tickets before going to the northbound platform. New shelters for passengers needing assistance are located at the northern end of the platforms, next to the manual wheelchair lifts. The shelters have been modified to accommodate wheelchairs.
