= Permanente Quarry =

Limestone quarry in California, U.S.

Coordinates: 37.319627°N 122.113552°W

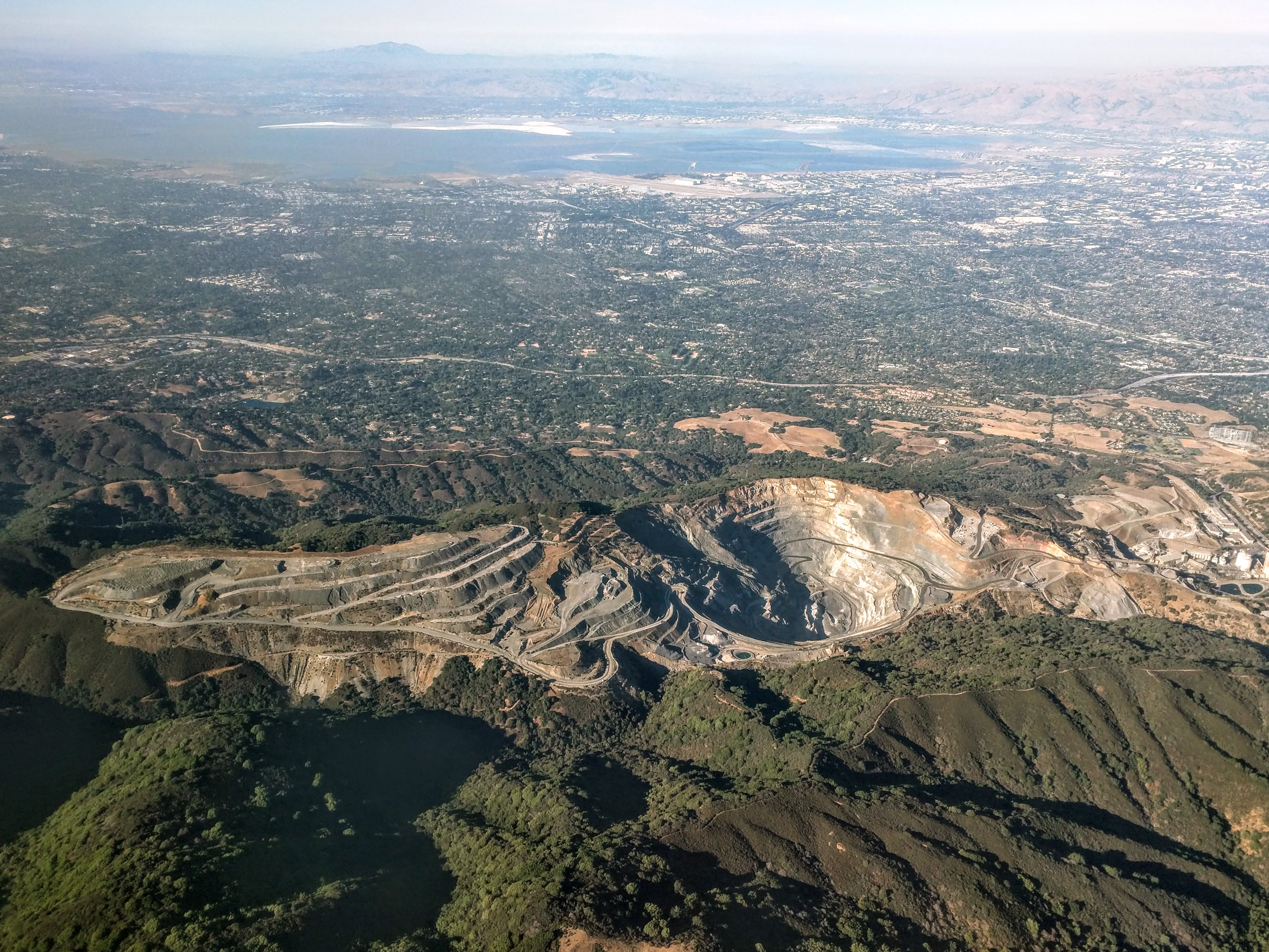
Aerial view of Permanente Quarry (Kaiser Permanente Cement Plant) in Santa Clara County, California, with background view of the South Bay and Mount Diablo

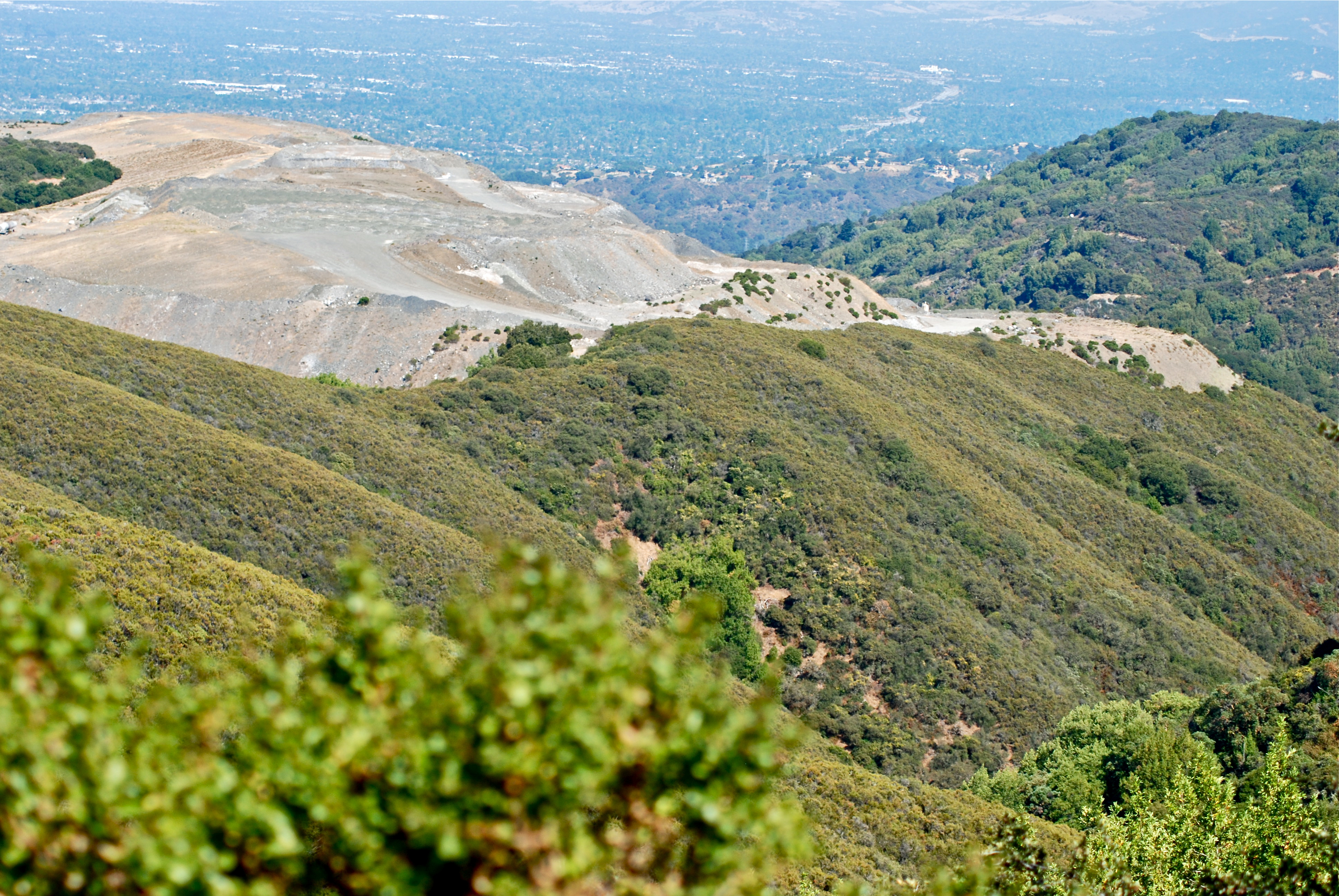
Waste quarry material piled over natural "Permanente Ridge" is visible from much of the South Bay.

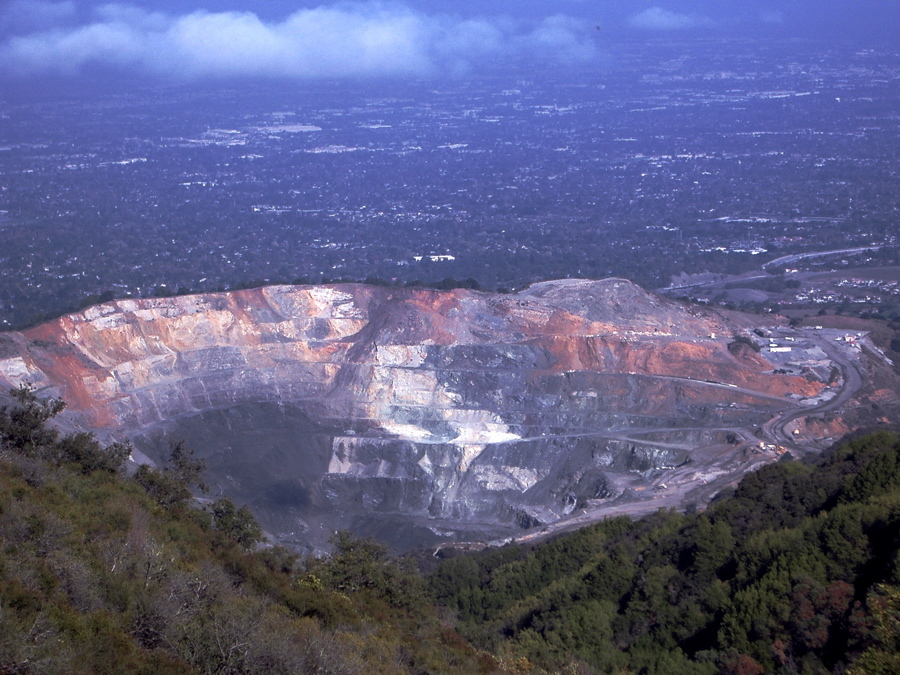
A view of Lehigh Southwest Cement's Permanente Quarry looking north from the summit of Black Mountain across the quarry and over Silicon Valley

The Permanente Quarry and cement plant is in an unincorporated area of Santa Clara County, California, just west of Cupertino. The limestone and aggregate mining operation and cement plant is owned by Lehigh Southwest Cement, a subsidiary of Heidelberg Cement. Limestone was mined beginning in 1902 but remained a small operation until 1939 when it was purchased by Henry J. Kaiser to supply the 5.5 million barrels of cement to build Shasta Dam. With increased production Kaiser supplied all of the cement used by the Navy in the Pacific Theater of World War II. At 7 million barrels, it was more cement than the Shasta Dam project. Roughly 70 percent of the cement used in the communities of Santa Clara County was acquired from the cement plant.

Located in the foothills above Cupertino on the northeast slopes of Black Mountain, the quarry runs east–west parallel to the upper watershed of Permanente Creek to the south and to Permanente Ridge and Rancho San Antonio Open Space Preserve to the north.

The limestone rock found in the Permanente Creek valley and on the summit of Black Mountain is relatively unique in the Bay Area. Microfossils in the limestone deposits suggest that the mountain originated as a seamount at 22 degrees north in the tropical Pacific about 100 million years ago and was transported to Los Altos by the Pacific Plate. These rocks occur as jagged gray boulders and outcrops just southwest of the radio towers on the summit of Black Mountain, as well as in the Permanente Quarry.

== Initial operations ==
In the 1890s, R. A Swayne purchased 160 acres of land at the headwaters of Permanente Creek. He planted vineyards, built a winery and other buildings, expending about $25,000 in the process. When that venture failed, Swayne sold the property for $1500. Granite Rock Company of Watsonville bought it from the subsequent owner for $2500 to mine the limestone. In 1902, the Alvarado Sugar Company contracted with Granite Rock to produce 5,000 tons of limestone to be shipped at the rate of two carloads per day. The Alvarado (now Newark, CA) plant was the first sugar beet factory in the country.

A state mining report in 1906 lists it as the El Dorado Sugar Company Quarry, located in Section 18 of Township 7 S, Range 2 W. That location is approximately 1.8 miles west of the end of Stevens Creek Boulevard. The rock was transported nine miles by wagon to Mountain View, where it was then loaded onto Southern Pacific Railroad trains at a rate of 30-60 tons per day in the dry season. The rock was taken to the sugar factory in Alviso where it was burned into quicklime and used to refine sugar. The stone was described as, "being good road material as it was in small pieces that would not require further grinding".

In 1906, the sugar refining industry was using much of the limestone quarried in California and only a small amount was used in road construction. Large amounts were also used for the manufacture of Portland cement.

In 1908, Southern Pacific Railroad completed the Mayfield Cutoff which ran from Mayfield (now part of Palo Alto), along the west side of the Santa Clara Valley to Los Gatos. There was a stop at Monta Vista where the tracks crossed Stevens Creek Boulevard. This eliminated the nine-mile wagon journey between the quarry and the railroad.

The operation continued intermittently until 1934.

== Early Kaiser Era ==
=== Cement ===
When the two bids to build Shasta Dam were opened in June 1938, they were only $262,000 apart on the $35 million project. The winning bid went to Pacific Constructors Inc. of Los Angeles, a consortium of twelve companies. The losing bid was entered by the Shasta Construction Company, a consortium of nine companies including Kaiser-Bechtel.

After losing the bid to build Shasta Dam, Henry J. Kaiser bid on supplying the cement, and another bid to provide the aggregate and sand to mix with the cement, to produce the 15 million tons of concrete used to build what would then be the second most massive dam in the world.

On June 5, 1939, the Columbia Construction Company, one of Henry Kaiser's many companies, won the bid to provide the 7.6 million tons of aggregate and 2.8 tons of sand required for the construction of Shasta Dam. Twenty years earlier, when Kaiser was building roads in the area, he purchased rights to a gravel bank in the area east of Redding, approximately nine miles from the Shasta Dam construction site. Southern Pacific Railroad wanted $0.27/ton to move the material to the construction site. The gravel was 1 1/2 miles from the Southern Pacific railhead which required the construction of a conveyor belt between the pit and the railroad. At the suggestion of one of Kaiser's engineers, a 9.6-mile conveyor belt system was built, completely bypassing the railroad, and delivering the aggregate at $0.18/ton.

In 1938, Henry Kaiser signed a three-year lease for 1000 acres along Arroyo Permanente, from the Santa Clara Holding Co. Ltd., at a cost of $12,000/year. On July 14, 1939, a deed recording revealed that the Permanente Corp. bought the land for $235/acre.

As with many of Kaiser's entities, the Permanente operation was a web of bank loans and partnerships with the other construction companies. Bank of America loaned $7 million for the cement plant and another $3.5 million was capitalized with investments from the other members of Six Companies, Kaiser's partners in the construction of Boulder Dam. Kaiser had 25.5%; Utah Company, J.F. Shea and General Construction had 13.5% each and the others varied from 1.5% for Pacific Bridge to 10.4% for MacDonald & Kahn. No government money was involved. Within a few years, it generated an annual profit of $2–3 million.

Two days before the cement supply bids for Shasta Dam were opened on April 31, 1939, the Santa Clara County Board of Supervisors voted to permit the construction of a $4,000,000 cement plant at Permanente.

Kaiser offered to deliver 5.58 million barrels of low-heat Portland cement at $1.90/barrel for a total cost of a little over $11 million. The Bureau of Reclamation rejected the second bid tendered by the Portland Cement Institute which was $1.6 million higher than Kaiser. The Institute bid came from a consortium the Beaver Portland Cement Company, the Calaveras Portland Cement Company, the Monolith Portland Cement Company, the Pacific Portland Cement Company, the Santa Cruz Portland Cement Company, and the Yosemite Portland Cement Company, which had often been the only bid on other large Bureau of Reclamation projects. After the bids were opened, the Institute offered to beat the Kaiser bid and they claimed that Kaiser's lack of a cement plant, and experience, would make it impossible for him to meet the contract. Ignoring their offer and protests, the Bureau awarded the contract to the Permanente Corp.

The cement plant was founded by Kaiser as the Kaiser Permanente Cement Plant in 1939, taking the name of the business from the Permanente Creek in whose valley it lies. Kaiser intended to use the quarry to provide the majority of the cement used in the construction of the Shasta Dam, supplying the 6 million barrels (950,000 m^{3}) of cement. Additionally, Kaiser Cement Company built Highway 101, Highway 85 and other major Northern California landmarks from the quarry.

Permanente is 300 miles (480 km) south of Shasta Dam, requiring the cement to be moved by rail. Southern Pacific built a 1.9-mile spur from the Los Altos Branch line to the plant site. That line required a wye at the Simla Junction. On October 1, 1939, Permanente became a Class A, non-agency station on the Los Altos Branch of Southern Pacific.

From the outset objections to the plant were lodged by neighboring farmers who were afraid that cement dust would adversely affect their wine grapes, apricot, cherry, and prune trees. A lawsuit was filed by 290 residents. There was a suspicion that the objections were raised by the cement industry consortium which was trying to stop Kaiser any way they could. A Cottrell precipitator collected dust from smokestacks on electrodes and trapped it into bins to be used for the manufacture of by- products. A consultant for the company argued that precipitators would remove 99% of the cement dust.

The Calera (Franciscan) limestone quarry, at an elevation of 1850-feet, lies between the San Andreas Fault and a branch fault known as the Black Mountain Fault. 5-cubic yard Bucyrus-Erie electric shovels put the limestone into diesel-powered Caterpillar-Le Tourneau rubber-tired 20-ton buggies and then onto four miles of gravity flow conveyor belts at the rate of 1000 tons per hour. As the gravity conveyor belt moved the rock one mile to the cement plant, energy was recovered from the brakes and used to power the electric shovels. There was a 1200-foot difference in elevation between the quarry and the cement plant.

The cement operation began with two 12-by-363-foot kilns, four Fuller coolers, 100-foot silos, crushing equipment and packing equipment. The plant employed many revolutionary production methods in order to produce the 7,000 barrels of cement each day needed for the Shasta Dam project.

Construction on the quarry and cement plant began in June 1939 and the first cement was shipped in December, even before it was needed at Shasta.

There were different grades of limestone within the Permanente Quarry. As lower grades of limestone were used for cement, a high-grade limestone was sold to the Spreckels Sugar Company plant in Salinas, California, to be used to purify beet sugar, a product which was enjoying a boom during the War. A deposit of low-alkali clay was also found in the quarry and was used for a high-strength cement.

The country was still in the Depression, so it was no surprise when hundreds of men showed up at the construction gate looking for work. They were turned away as it was a union job site. Out of state workers who showed up at the Labor Temple of San Jose of Local 270 of the Laborer's Union were turned away as there weren't enough jobs for local residents. Those who wanted to work had to pay $31.50 to join the union and then pay $1.50 a month for dues.

Another kiln was added in 1940 to boost output to 12,000 barrels/day. Even before production was a full capacity for Shasta, Permanente Cement Co. had contracts for a half million barrels each, from the Navy for dry docks and air bases in the Hawaiian Islands, and from the ready-Mix Concrete Company of Honolulu. At the time these contracts were announced in February 1940, Henry J. Kaiser Jr. the plant manager, said the dust control apparatus was functioning perfectly and capturing 70-100 tons of cement dust a day which was used over again.

In order to fulfill the overseas contracts, Kaiser bought the SS Ancon and her sister ship, the SS Cristobal, which had been used in the construction of the Panama Canal. The ships were converted into bulk carriers, with a capacity of 40,000 barrels each, at the Todd Shipyard in Seattle. These ships, renamed SS Permanente and SS Philippa, respectively, were operated by the Matson Navigation Company.

In June 1940, Permanente Cement signed a lease with the Port of Redwood City for four acres of land for 20 years for spur tracks, storage silos and bulk ship loading equipment. Cement was brought by rail and truck from the Permanente plant and loaded into the two ships. The port facility made it possible to fulfill the Navy contracts which by November 1941 included construction projects at Midway, Guam, Wake, and other American-owned Pacific islands.

Henry Kaiser's first experience with ships prompted him to form the Todd-California Shipbuilding Corporation, and then winning a bid from the British to build thirty cargo ships. He started by building a shipyard in Richmond, California, later adding three more there, and three along the Columbia River in Portland, Oregon, and Vancouver, Washington. After the British ships were built, Todd pulled out of the partnership to focus on their own shipbuilding business. These seven shipyards produced about 25% of the total U.S. production of ships during World War II.

When Henry Kaiser purchased the quarry land, he also got a stone-and-redwood building high in the hills at the headwaters of Permanente Creek. According to legend, the house, served by only one road, had been a speakeasy. Kaiser converted it to a lodge and he, and his wife, Bess, spent time in the quiet surroundings. Rio Permanente or sometimes, Arroyo Permanente, was discovered in 1776 by Col. Juan Bautista de Anza as he explored Alta California, for the King of Spain. Rio Permanente was so named, as it continued to flow all year, unlike most streams in California which dry up in the summer. Bess Kaiser suggested the name for the medical program at the shipyards, which after the War were made available to the public, becoming the Kaiser Permanente Health Plan. The shipyards, steel plant in Fontana, California, and magnesium productions facilities operated as the Permanente Metal Corp. after Todd left Todd-California Shipbuilding Corp.

== World War II ==
On the morning on December 7, 1941, SS Permanente was moored at Pier 31-A in the Honolulu Harbor, offloading cement to the storage facility located there. Just 10–15 feet from her bow was the ''USS Vega'' (AK-17), a Navy cargo ship loaded with 130 tons of explosives. According to the after-action report filed by the commanding officer of USS Vega, at about 9:30 they saw a group of Japanese planes circling over the harbor in preparation of a dive-bombing attack. Vega fired her anti-aircraft guns, but three bombs were dropped, one hitting the water just 30 yards off SS Permanente's bow. The planes also strafed the water near the ships. Later that day, sailors on Ford Island at Pearl Harbor built machine gun nests using Permanente Cement bags.

When Pearl Harbor was attacked, 65,000 barrels were available in the Pacific, most of it in Permanente's privately owned bulk facilities in Honolulu, making it possible to quickly put the airfields back into action.

Initially the Navy was against using bulk cement in the tropics fearing the moisture would cause the cement to deteriorate. Kaiser was confident that would not be the case and guaranteed acceptable quality delivered right to the construction site, using compressed air to blow the cement in and out of the ships.

Permanente was given the contract to supply all of the bulk cement for Pacific airfields, fortifications, and other wartime installations. Shipments averaged 5000 barrels daily from the bulk silos in Honolulu during 1942–43. The dollar volume was $15 million saving the government $7.5 million using bulk cement over sacked cement. This does not consider how much the bulk operations saved in ship-hours or the man-hours necessary in handling the cement. The savings in man-hours probably was twice that of the product. Permanente was the only American company to provide bulk cement.

Seven million barrels of Permanente cement was delivered to Contractors, Pacific Naval Air Bases (CPNAB), a construction firm building fortifications in the Pacific. No Permanente cement shipment ever failed to be delivered on time, even when ordered on short notice or in large quantity.

CPNAB was a consortium of construction companies. Although Kaiser was not among those companies, some his partners from the Six Companies, including W. A. Bechtel Company, Morrison-Knudsen Company, Inc., and the Utah Construction Company, were involved.

== Magnesium production ==
When aircraft downed during the 1940 Battle of Britain were examined, it was determined that German manufacturers used magnesium in engine mounts, wing surfaces and other parts to enable their planes to fly farther and faster than the British planes. This created a demand for magnesium production in the U.S. At the time, Dow Chemical Company, with just one plant capable of producing six million tons per year, was the only magnesium manufacturer in the country. The government declared magnesium to be a strategic metal, with all production to be used in national defense. The government introduced a $400 million program in 1941 to spur production.

Dr. Fritz Johann Hansgirg (b. 1891 in Austria) invented the carbothermic magnesium reduction process in 1928 in Radenthein, Austria. He set up a pilot plant using his process. His senior partner, Emil Winter of the Pittsburgh Steel Company, owned the patent rights.

In 1935, he was invited by Japanese entrepreneur, Shitagau Noguchi, to build a magnesium plant at the Chosen Nitrogen Fertilizer Complex in Hungnam (known as "Konan" by the Japanese) in northern Korea. Hansgirg also set up other chemical processing plants at the same location until 1940 when Japanese pro-Axis militarism caused Hansgirg to leave for the United States. Among the other systems that Hansgirg left behind was one for the production Heavy water using a water gas shift reduction process. Korea was a colony of Japan from 1910 until 1945 when it was portioned with the United States in control of the south, and the Soviet Union in control of the north. That allowed the Soviets to take possession of the former Hansgirg plants who transferred the technology back to Russia to use in their own atomic bomb program. The United States also utilized Hansgirg's CECE process for heavy water in atomic bomb production.

In 1940, Hansgirg was hired by Henry J. Kaiser to build a magnesium plant at Permanente utilizing his carbothermic magnesium process. Kaiser paid Emil Winter $750,000 for the patent of the carbothermic process. He received a loan for $9,250,000 from the Reconstruction Finance Corporation (RFC) to construct a magnesium production and fabricating facility. Construction on the $11.5 million plant began in March 1941 on the first eight-million-pound unit. The RFC loan eventually amounted to $22.75 million.

The magnesium plant, a venture of the Chemical Engineering Division of the Todd California Shipbuilding Corp., was located adjacent to the Permanente Cement Plant. 2000 men worked 24-hours a day, seven days a week to build the plant. The plant was referred to being on, "Hill 835" as that was the elevation of the land which was leveled off for construction. The changes in elevation to allow the materials to utilize gravity to move through the process.

The magnesium production plant at Permanente was part of a massive undertaking by the U.S. government to increase production. Until 1941, Dow Chemical Company was the only magnesium producer in the country. In addition to providing government subsidies to the privately owned Permanente Metals Corp. plant, the government had several government-owned, contractor-operated (GOCO) operations, all of which combined to end the Dow monopoly. Different plants used different processes to produce magnesium, but the Permanente plant was the only one to use the Hansgirg process. Total U.S. production increased from 12 million pounds in 1940, to nearly 600 million pounds in early 1944. Mobilization officials cut back on production in 1944 as it far outweighed demand by nearly 100 million pounds annually.

In addition to the Permanente privately owned plant, Kaiser managed a GOCO plant in Manteca, California. The $6 million facility, built by the Defense Plant Corporation (DPC) used the "ferrosilicon process" to produce magnesium metal. The Manteca plant began production in June 1942, making 10 tons of magnesium per day.

A ferrosilicon plant operated at Permanente from 1942 to 1944 to supply the Manteca operation. Quartz from White Rock in Mariposa County, supplemented with quartz gravel from the Bear River in Placer County, Alabama and local oil refinery coke, semi-anthracite Oklahoma coal and scrap iron were combined in an electric furnace to make ferrosilicon.

The ferrosilicon process was also a carbothermic process which combined dolomite ore, a source of magnesium oxide, with ferrosilicon, a combination of iron and quartz. Heating pieces of this mix at high temperatures releases magnesium.

Hansgirg's carbothermic magnesium reduction process required the magnesium oxide and carbon to be heated to 3800 °F and then rapidly cooled to 380 °F in one thousandth of a second to precipitate the metals. This was achieved by using very cold natural gas. Because of the proximity of the magnesium facility and the cement plant, the natural gas was used to cool the magnesium process then burned in the cement kilns. The magnesium carbonate and magnesite ore arrived by rail from Kaiser-owned mines in Nevada and the gas was piped from San Joaquin Valley oil fields. Raw ore was $0.50 per ton and the finished product was $450 per ton.

Additional magnesium oxide was produced in Kaiser's seaside plant in Moss Landing, just south of Watsonville. North of Salinas, ten miles from Moss Landing was Permanente's Natividad plant where dolomite, a calcium-magnesium carbonate was quarried, crushed, and calcined (heated) in a kiln, separating calcium-magnesium oxide and carbon dioxide. The material was trucked to Moss Landing where it was mixed with sea water, which contains a small amount of magnesium chloride, resulting in magnesium hydroxide. That mixture was heated in a 203-foot long, nine-foot diameter rotary kiln, causing it to decompose into water vapor and magnesium oxide. Most of the sea water was returned to Monterey Bay. After processing and cooling, the resulting white powder magnesium oxide was trucked to Permanente.

It only took until September 1941 to produce the first metal, and by January 1942 production was up to five tons per week, with a goal of fifteen tons a day by the end of February. In addition to the 12000-KVA furnaces, they built a complex of thirty-six large retorts to distill the metal into the final product. The retorts were moved by a large moveable hammerhead crane which came from Kaiser's construction job at Grand Coulee Dam. Initial production was shipped to aircraft and munitions factories, but work was proceeding on adding a fabrication plant and a mill to turn out rolled sheet magnesium and tubing. The eventual goal was 24,000-tons by June which would have been enough for 48,000 airplanes, assuming each utilized 985 pounds of magnesium.

The production of magnesium was extremely dangerous due to its volatility. Just as production was ramping up in August 1941, three men were killed as a blaze erupted when powdered magnesium was funneling through a rubber coupling into a cylindrical retort. In November 1941, another worker was burned when a reduction retort flared up. The powdered magnesium was mixed with oil to exclude air as it was put into the retorts. The temperature could build up and spontaneously combust causing a flare up.

Ten days after the attack on Pearl Harbor, the FBI arrested Dr. Hansgirg at the Permanente plant for being an enemy alien. Hansgirg left Austria in 1934 but the Anschluss resulted in the annexation of Austria into the German Reich and Hitler declared war on the United States on December 11, 1941. According to Sheriff William Emig, Hansgirg professed a hatred for Adolf Hitler, and although he had worked in Japanese-controlled Korea, it was for a branch of the American Magnesium Metals Corporation. At the time of his arrest, Hansgirg was supervising the connection of the first and second units and he was the only one who knew how to do so.

As work progressed in early 1942, Hansgirg managed the construction and production from twelve miles away in the Santa Clara County Jail. He was rumored to have use of a private telephone. The 50-year-old Hansgirg was described by Sheriff Emig as a, "charming old man". Kaiser did his best to get him released from custody. When first arrested, Hansgirg was allowed to visit the plant in the custody of a deputy sheriff, but the FBI later stopped the visits, claiming it was in a prohibited area.

In April 1942, Hansgirg was turned over to Army authorities and detained at the Sharp Park Detention Station. He was then moved to alien internment camps in Texas and Oklahoma When Attorney General Francis Biddle denied his wife, Josephine Marie, the right to visit him, she wrote a personal letter to First Lady, Eleanor Roosevelt, telling her that Fritz could not publicly criticize Hitler because their son was in the German Army and would suffer retaliation. Marie Hansgirg wrote Mrs. Roosevelt that if her husband was reinstated, then, "his loyalty and integrity may again be recognized in this country, you may know you will have the undying gratitude of his wife". The letter was forwarded to FBI Director, J. Edgar Hoover, who consulted with the director of the Alien Enemy Control Unit. Hansgirg was released to the custody of the treasurer of Black Mountain College in North Carolina where he taught chemistry and physics. He continued to do research on the production of magnesium giving 205 of the shares in his North Carolina Magnesium Development Company to the college. After leaving the college, Hansgirg worked for various companies until he died unexpectedly in July 1949, at the age of 58. It was suspected he died from years of ingestion of magnesium.

In March 1942, tragedy again struck the Permanente Plant when Harry P. Davis, the Plant Manager and Superintendent, and Henry J. Monsees, the Chief of Guards, died when the car that Davis was driving veered off the roadway and struck a tree in nearby Los Altos. Among the honorary pall bearers were Henry J. Kaiser, his sons, Edgar and Henry Jr, and Dr. Fritz Hansgirg.

In November 1942, Raymond E. Floyd, a 41-year-old worker from Los Gatos was killed instantly when he was crushed under a seven-ton retort that fell while being hoisted.

In 1943, Charles Rabella, a 38-year old truck driver died from burns suffered as he hauled a load of excavated material from the magnesium plant up the canyon. The debris fell from the truck and struck a pile of magnesium-carbon residue igniting a flash fire which engulfed his truck.

On April 1, 1943, many newspapers carried a story from the United Press that according to Sheriff William Emig, professional safe crackers burglarized the Hoo Hoo House and stole $4200 in Permanente Magnesium payroll funds. There was no explanation as to why PMC funds were in the safe of the Hoo Hoo House resort, which was located about two miles east of the Permanente property, rather than the well-guarded industrial complex.

The Hansgirg process was never as efficient in practice as it was on paper resulting in the Permanente plant being the only one that was losing money. Total production for the entire war was 10,000 tons of magnesium ingot which was less than the initial plan of 12,000 tons annually. The Reserve Metals Company (RMC), a wartime government corporation, bought PMC magnesium at a higher price than was paid to other producers to offset the losses incurred by Kaiser. In 1943, the subsidy amounted to $2.75 million. In November 1943 the RMC cancelled Permanente's magnesium subsidy. Even with improved efficiency, continued production of the metal would require PMC to sell below the cost of production. In 1944, the War Production Board shut down nine GOCO plants including Manteca.

One of Henry J. Kaiser's more famous quotes is, "Problems are only opportunities in work clothes." He put that into action when confronting the reduced demand for magnesium metal and taking advantage of the unique product in the Hansgirg process. The rapid cooling of the extremely hot magnesium oxide and carbon compound, produced a highly volatile fine powder. Kaiser engineers mixed the magnesium powder with asphalt to create, "goop", a compound they believed was more effective than napalm.

From the time that the magnesium plant effort began, PMC was exploring the idea of making incendiary bombs. Incendiary devices were under the purview of the Chemical Weapons Service (CWS). In 1941, PMC was interested in making the M50 bomb, a four-pound device, delivered in clusters, that used a magnesium casing and thermite, a mixture of aluminum powder and iron oxide. The bomb was based on the British Mark III bomb. PMC would make the flammable magnesium bomb casings. In the early years of the war only 5% of U.S. magnesium production went into bombs while most of it was used in combination with aluminum for aircraft parts.

In June 1942, PMC delivered 70,000 pounds of magnesium alloy (containing 5% aluminum) to four California metal fabricators to make into M50 bomb casings. The M47 and M69 bombs used in 1942 and 1943 used gelled gasoline, known as napalm as the incendiary material. By early 1944, there was a move away from small cluster bombs to 500-pound bombs as the larger Boeing B-29 Superfortress had a much higher payload. The development of napalm did not stop PMC from working on "goop". "Goop" was developed by F. W. Van Loenen, a research engineer at Permanente who also represented PMC while working with the British on incendiary devices.

In late 1943, CWS purchased 3 million pounds of "goop" at a price of $.36/pound ($1,080,000 total.) The sale of "goop" replaced magnesium ingots and allowed PMC to finally turn a small profit on magnesium production.

Kaiser engineers created "PT Mix," an incendiary compound for bombs consisting of 39% "microscopic magnesium dust", 10% asphalt, 5% distillate, 27% gasoline, 10% magnesium crystals, 5% sodium nitrate, 3% isobutyl methacrylate gel, and 1% ammonium percolate. The first three ingredients comprised "goop" while the other ingredients were napalm. Commercial dough mixers were used at the CWS Edgewood Arsenal in Maryland to produce the PT Mix, 170 pounds of which was loaded into 500-pound bomb casings.

Demand for "goop" varied month to month as changes in the execution of the aerial war took place. The CWS preferred "goop" to napalm but still used both materials. In late 1944, orders for use in the European Theater decreased as the Air Forces had plenty of incendiary materials on hand and they were nearing the end of that war.

PMC delivered about 38 million pounds of "goop" in 1945, about equal to deliveries in 1944. Just days after Gen. Curtis LeMay took command of the XXI Bomber Command in the Pacific, PMC received an order for 5 million pounds per month. The PT Mix was used in both the 10-pound M74 bombs dropped in clusters and the 500-pound M76 bomb in both theaters of the War.

The March 9–10, 1945, firebombing of Tokyo, utilizing the M69 bomb, loaded with napalm, killed more than 80,000 people. On May 25–26, 464 Boeing B-29s bombers dropped 3,251 tons of incendiaries on Tokyo. 348 tons of those bombs were M76 bombs filled with Permanente "goop". Seventeen square miles of the city were destroyed, including the homes of half a million people.

On July 28–29, 1945, 61 B-29s of the USAAF 58th Bombardment Wing, launched from Iwo Jima, dropped almost 80,000 M74 bombs, all filled with "goop" on the small Japanese city of Aomori. The material was designed to stick to ceilings and other surfaces and burned at a high temperature which could not be easily extinguished. 88% of the city was destroyed, killing 1,767 people. The night before the raid two B-29s dropped leaflets over Aomori, and ten other target cities, warning the population that 5-6 of the cities would be bombed and urging them to evacuate. The Japanese government ordered that the leaflets be turned in without being read and any discussion could result in imprisonment.

The United States Strategic Bombing Survey was not able to determine whether "goop", napalm or other incendiaries were the most effective as they all inflicted heavy damage on the predominantly wood structures in Japanese cities. "Goop" accounted for about 9% of the total incendiary materials used by the U.S. during the War.

On August 29, 1945, a ceremony was held at the Permanente Plant where the Army presented the Army-Navy "E" Award for outstanding production of war materials, especially "goop". Capt. George E. Dawson of the Chemical Warfare Service told the 500 employees, "While your work on the M-76 incendiary-the one used mostly in Germany-was commendable, it wasn't until the M-47 goop bomb was developed that you really went to town. The goop bomb was really the fourth and highest step in the development of incendiaries for the army and navy air forces." Dawson said, "Only four out of every 100 war production plants in the United States have registered sufficiently excellent production to obtain the "E" award".

In October 1945, Major General Sir Donald Banks, directing general of the British Petroleum Warfare Department visited Permanente to acknowledge their efforts in the development of flame thrower fluids and the creation of "goop".

Kaiser was able to make the final payment on the $28.5 million to the RFC loan, five years ahead of schedule.

== Post-World War II ==
In July 1946, Kaiser announced the completion at the Permanente plant of the first test model of intercity bus for Santa Fe Trailways. The 63-passenger was 60-feet long with three sets of wheels and articulated in the middle with front and back wheels which turned automatically, giving it a 38-foot turning radius. Built of aluminum and magnesium, it was powered by a 275-hp Cummins Diesel engine, mounted under the floor. It featured swivel chair seats with 40 inches of leg room instead of 35 inches, observation-car windows, air conditioning and lavatories.

Although only one bus was ever produced, it was used by Santa Fe Trailways in advertisements. The bus operated between San Francisco and Los Angeles until the mid-1950s.

In October 1946, Permanente launched a $1,000,000 expansion program to increase cement production by 10% to 5,500,000 barrels (22,000,000 sacks) per year to meet demand in Hawaii and the Seattle area.

Tragedy struck the plant again on July 30, 1946, while experimentation on a new commercial explosive was being conducted at a lab on the property. A premature explosion instantly killed Mrs. Jean Targhetta whose body was hurled more than 100 feet against the side of the canyon. Eugene Bayne died from third-degree burns. Two other men received minor injuries. The blast was felt ten miles away and ignited numerous grass fires. The explosion took place on Hill 835, the same elevation as the original magnesium plant.

The magnesium plant was dismantled and sold in 1947.

Ferrosilicon production resumed in 1949 for some years, with the product shipped to the Manteca plant. The silica byproduct was also used as a binder in refractory bricks made at the Moss Landing plant.

The end of World War II meant the end of shipbuilding and magnesium production by Permanente Metals Corporation, but the void was filled by Kaiser's entry into the aluminum business in 1946. There was a great demand for aluminum for aircraft and construction materials, but production was limited by a lack of sufficient electrical power. Bauxite ore from mines in South America (Kaiser later owned their bauxite mines in Jamaica) was shipped to Baton Rouge, Louisiana, to be separated into alumina powder and ore. The alumina was shipped to two plants in Washington State to be reduced to ingots and to a third plant in Washington to be turned into plate, sheet and strip aluminum. The government granted patent rights to Kaiser to establish a third competitor to Alcoa and Reynolds.

In 1948, Kaiser bought an aluminum foil plant from the Foreign Liquidation Commission. It was the first German plant offered to American companies under the war reparations agreement. It was dismantled, shipped to Permanente where it was reassembled at the former magnesium foundry building and machine shop. The plant was known as Aluminumwerke Tscheulin which was in the French military zone in Baden. The owner, Emil Tscheulin was one of the first German industrialists to back Adolf Hitler in the mid-1920s. In turn he received war contracts but also exported aluminum foil to the U.S. and other countries before the war. Sheets of light gauge aluminum came from the Kaiser Spokane plant. The foil was used for electronic, radio, refrigeration and air conditioning equipment and as protective packaging for food, tobacco, chewing gum, candy, and medical supplies. At the time it was the only aluminum foil plant west of the Mississippi River. By that time Kaiser was producing 20% of the nation's aluminum.

Kaiser bought the plant for $203,000 and spent about $800,000 rehabilitating the machinery, doubling the speed of production and increasing the capacity from 150-pound coils to 750 pounds. The 900-foot coil of sheet aluminum passed through five cold-reducing mills into thirteen miles of aluminum foil. The three lines could produce about 500,000 pounds per month but operated at a reduced capacity when it opened in 1949, due to a buyer's market. As the only foil plant in the West, they looked at the dried fruit packing industry as a possible market. At the time the nearby Santa Clara Valley was the largest fruit-producing region in the world.

In November 1949, Permanente Metals became Kaiser Aluminum and Chemical Corporation (KACC). It was the nation's third largest aluminum producer.

A market was found in the growing television industry. Aluminum foil of 99.8% purity and 0.003 inches thick was used for television condensers. The product was shipped to television parts producers in New England.

Kaiser was producing aluminum foil for household use by 1952. They continued to make upgrades to the Permanente plant, and by 1954, Kaiser Aluminum was fully integrated with the purchase of bauxite mines in Jamaica. With additional space added, the Permanente facility was 60,000 square feet. They could produce foil up to 54-inches wide, as large as any in the nation. The annual capacity was 18,000,000 pounds per year which was about 30% of the nation's output. They employed 175 people at the time.

In 1955, Kaiser and Fritz Burns, his California home building partner, bought the Niumamu Hotel, a group of dilapidated cottages at the west end of Waikiki. They renovated the cottages giving them a Polynesian look and low-rise hotel buildings were added. They added high-rise towers in what became one of the first modern hotels in Waikiki. They later took on Conrad Hilton as a partner and eventually sold out to him. It is now known as the Hilton Hawaiian Village. In 1957, Kaiser added a revolutionary domed auditorium to the hotel property.

Some years earlier Kaiser had enlisted Buckminster Fuller, the futurist and designer, to design a car. Kaiser used Fuller's Geodesic Dome (Fuller owned the patent of a British design) to fabricate an aluminum dome at the Permanente site.

On a site adjacent to the hotel, a central 96' mast was raised, and the diamond-shaped panels were bolted together as they were raised by the mast. The job was completed in only 20 hours. After completion, the mast was removed, and the center hole was enclosed. The dome stood 50' high and was 145' in diameter with 16,500 sq. ft. of pillar-less interior space capable of holding 1800-2000 people. The dome was anchored to 25 concrete piers around the floor. The cost was $80,000. Kaiser engineers stressed the strength and low cost of the structure.

Kaiser spent $100,000 to install a curved movie screen and seat risers, complete with loge seating to make the dome more like a theater. Around the World in 80 Days had its Hawaiian premier in the dome, complete with producer Michael Todd accompanied by his wife, Elizabeth Taylor. Newspaper accounts noted the quality of the sound in the auditorium.

A few months after the Honolulu event, Kaiser launched Dome Enterprises, a new venture in which he partnered with Mike Todd, architect Frank Lloyd Wright and Sylvester "Pat" Weaver, with the plan of building dome theaters all over the world to accommodate wide movie screens. Mike Todd was an original participant in Cinerama (projecting three images onto a curved screen) and then Todd AO 70mm projection. Pat Weaver had been president of NBC but at the time was working with Kaiser sponsorship of the Maverick TV show. The Dome Enterprises plan offered an inexpensive way to build new theaters to house the big screens.

Mike Todd was killed in an airplane crash just a few weeks after the Dome Enterprise announcement, ending of the new venture.

The City of Virginia Beach, Virginia, built the same version of Kaiser's dome as the one in Honolulu as an auditorium at their convention center. It was dismantled in 1994. There was another built to house the gymnasium at Palomar Junior College and a slightly smaller one at the National Orange Show Grounds, both in Southern California. Both of those domes are still in use. The dome in Honolulu was demolished in 1999 to make way for another hotel tower.

In 1957 Permanente Cement added a second plant in the Lucerne Valley in San Bernardino County to supply the Southern California market. As the top producer on the West Coast, Permanente's total capacity was 11 million barrels which accounted for 20% of the total market in the Pacific Coast states and British Columbia. They continued to ship bulk cement to Hawaii, other Pacific islands, Mexico, Central and South America and South Asia. Silos at their Redwood City port terminal filled the holds of SS Permanente Silverbow (58,000 barrels) and SS Permanente Cement (40,000 barrels.)

On July 2, 1964, the Permanente Cement Co. became Kaiser Cement & Gypsum Corp. Owned 39% by Kaiser Industries Corp, it retained Permanente as the trademark of the cement products.

The foil plant and cement plant at Permanente were still in operation when Henry J. Kaiser died in August 1967. His son, Edgar F. Kaiser, became chairman of the board. KACC controlled 196 plants in 34 states and 50 countries, employed 90,000 with sales over $2 billion. In 1987, Kaiser Aluminum and Chemical was reorganized as a subsidiary of KaiserTech Limited, a holding company. The next year KaiserTech was acquired by MAXXAM Group, a subsidiary of MAXXAM Inc.

The foil plant was shut down in May 1990 after the company had the plant on the market for two years. The final products made there were honeycomb foil used in the aircraft industry and coil for window blinds. Kaiser Aluminum and Chemical were trying to get out of the foil business. The final 100 employees were laid off with the shutdown. The need to divest the plant at Permanente was because MAXXAM had to shed KaiserTech assets to pay debts due to junk bond financing. MAXXAM was connected with Michael Milken, the king of junk bonds.

A new crushed rock facility was added at the Permanente Quarry in 1957 to turn quarry overburden, normally a waste material, into base rock for highway construction. It was expected that the new plant would provide 500,000 tons of materials annually.

Henry J. Kaiser said, "Pink makes you feel good." He was so enamored with the color that he used it extensively in furniture and linens at the Hawaiian Village Hotel. The hotel also featured speedboats, catamarans, and outrigger canoes. Customers at the adjoining car rental agency could rent bright pink Willys Surrey Gala Jeeps with pink-stripped cloth tops and upholstery. Kaiser Motors bought the Willys-Overland Company in 1953 and produced Jeeps until selling the company to American Motors in 1970. Carrying the pink vehicle idea one step further, Kaiser Cement and Kaiser Sand & Gravel trucks, many operating from the Permanente plant were painted pink with the slogan, "Find a need and fill it." painted on the vehicles.

In 1963, the Southern Pacific Los Altos Branch was abandoned when Santa Clara County wanted the right-of-way to build Foothill Expressway. The Vasona Branch tracks were realigned, eliminating the "Wye" at Simla, and leading directly to the Permanente Plant. That right-of-way remained in use until the plant was closed.

Hanson Cement acquired Kaiser Cement for $200 million in 1986. The cement company was renamed Hanson Permanente Cement in 1999. At the time of sale, Kaiser Cement was the 5th largest producer of cement in the entire United States.

== Operations under opposition ==
Under the terms of a 1985 reclamation plan, the quarry was not supposed to dump quarry waste materials more than 100 feet higher than the natural chaparral ridge known as Permanente Ridge. This waste material storage area, or WMSA, was piled on and above the Permanente Ridge and this brownish-gray scar is visible from much of the southern Bay Area – despite claims from the 2004 owner, Hanson Cement, that it was hydroseeded annually with native grass mix and that they planted 80% of the area in trees and shrubs, it remains a barren zone, degrading the aesthetic value of the adjacent Rancho San Antonio Open Space Preserve. This barren ridge line, referred to by Lehigh Southwest as the West Materials Storage Area (WMSA) is visible to much of the Silicon Valley.

On December 19, 2011, the Sierra Club sued Lehigh Southwest Cement Company and Heidelberg Cement in federal court to stop its unpermitted discharges of selenium and other toxic water pollutants into Permanente Creek. The Sierra Club maintains that Lehigh has been polluting Permanente Creek in violation of the Clean Water Act for the time-frame that it had been listed as an "impaired water body" by both the U.S. Environmental Protection Agency and the San Francisco Bay Regional Water Quality Control Board. Lehigh's own water quality analyses have demonstrated that quarry pit wastewater that Lehigh discharges into the creek have been 16 times higher than Clean Water Act stream standards. Such pollution would be especially harmful to aquatic life in downstream areas such as Rancho San Antonio County Park, where selenium concentrations are often more than five times higher than state and federal standards allow.

On June 7, 2012, the Santa Clara County Board of Supervisors approved amendments to the 1985 Permanente Quarry Reclamation Plan for Lehigh Southwest Cement Company, including approval of a new waste material storage area (EMSA) at the east end of the quarry. The newly approved Reclamation Plan has 89 conditions (significantly more than the 73 conditions in the 1985 Amendment), and calls for higher performance standards for re-vegetation of all disturbed areas, minimizing selenium runoff and an increased level of reporting and monitoring. The Board also ratified the Final Environmental Impact Report in accordance with the California Environmental Quality Act.

In December 2012, the Midpeninsula Regional Open Space District filed a lawsuit against Santa Clara County, challenging the reclamation plan for Lehigh Southwest Cement's Permanente Quarry near Cupertino, saying its environmental impact report failed to analyze and mitigate the project's impacts on air quality, hazardous materials, recreation, groundwater and endangered species.

In 2013, Lehigh settled the lawsuit by paying at least $10 million "to implement a water treatment system". Part of the settlement is "a $12 million surety bond to guarantee that the work is done."

=== Economic problems and bankruptcy ===
Hanson Permanente Cement filed for Chapter 11 bankruptcy with the US Bankruptcy Court in 2016. The bankruptcy is related to more than 14,000 injury lawsuits. The previous year, Hanson Permanente Cement was ordered to spend $5 million to install an advanced wastewater treatment plant along with $2.55 million in civil penalties.

== 2011 shooting ==
On October 5, 2011, the Lehigh Southwest Cement plant was the site of a shooting committed by a disgruntled employee, 47-year-old Shareef Allman. During a safety meeting at 4:00 a.m., Allman opened fire with a .223-caliber semiautomatic rifle, later revealed to be an AK-47, and a .40-caliber handgun, killing three coworkers and wounding six others. He later shot and wounded a woman and attempted to carjack her a few hours after the shooting. The shooting prompted a manhunt which caused a lockdown to some schools and businesses in nearby communities. Allman was confronted by Santa Clara County sheriff's deputies the next day in a neighborhood in Sunnyvale, in which he pointed a firearm towards them and three deputies responded with gunfire. It was initially reported that Allman died from the officer's gunshots, but it was later determined he died from a self-inflicted gunshot wound to the head. The deceased victims were Mark Munoz, 59, Manuel Pinon, 48, and John Vallejos, 51. The gunman was previously an extra in the 2006 movie The Pursuit of Happyness.

== Pollution ==
=== Mercury emissions and impact on human health ===
The cement plant at the quarry has been fueled by petroleum coke since 2007, the latter (along with the limestone itself) is a major source of mercury emissions. The cement plant was responsible for 29 percent of total Bay Area airborne mercury emissions and was shown to impact a rural site, Calero Reservoir, 20 miles (32 km) away. Mercury, a neurotoxin and pollutant which is concentrated in the aquatic food web, was found to be 5.8 to 6.7 times higher in precipitation near the cement plant than at a control location 2.0 miles (3.2 km) away. A 2011 study showed a significant geographic association between the occurrence of autism in local school districts, such as the Cupertino Union School District, and higher levels of ambient mercury generated by coal-fired power plants in Bexar County, Texas and the Permanente Quarry cement plant in Santa Clara County, California.

=== Selenium discharge ===
Groundwater fills the current quarry and is pumped into Permanente Creek. Selenium pollution in the creek downstream from the quarry ranged from 13 to 81 micrograms/liter (μg/L). A North Quarry water sample in January 2010 had a dissolved selenium concentration of 82 μg/L, indicating that the quarry is the source of the selenium pollution. Selenium is bioaccumulated in the aquatic food web. Safety standards for selenium concentrations in fresh water are 5 μg/L under the California Toxics Rule (same as the National Toxics Rule set by the U.S. Environmental Protection Agency (USEPA) in 2000 and 2012.

=== Sediment discharges ===
Anthropization related to quarry operations and the cement plant have resulted in sediment discharges into Permanente Creek that are 3.5 times what would be expected under undeveloped conditions. Sediment loads in the upper Permanente Creek mainstem are 15 times those in the West Fork Permanente Creek, which drains mostly parkland. These sediment loads could threaten the resident rainbow trout (Oncorhynchus mykiss) population in the creek.

== Closure ==
The cement kiln closed temporarily in April 2020. It was later decided that it would not reopen, thus permanently ending cement production. Quarry activity will also end at a date to be determined. In August 2023, the Santa Clara County Board of Supervisors agreed to the permanent closure of the quarry.

== See also ==
- Guadalupe Valley Creek
- Rockaway Quarry
