= Los Altos station =

Former railway station

Los Altos

General information
- Location: 288 1st Street; Los Altos, California
- Coordinates: 37.377202°N 122.117764°W

History
- Opened: 1907
- Closed: January 1964
- Rebuilt: 1913

Services
Preceding station	Southern Pacific Railroad	Following station
California Avenue toward San Francisco	Peninsula Commute Mayfield Cutoff	Monta Vista toward Vasona
Peninsular Railway
Alta Mesa toward Palo Alto	Palo Alto – Jose	Springer Road toward Market Street Depot
Alta Mesa toward Palo Alto	Palo Alto – Los Gatos	Springer Road toward Los Gatos

Los Altos station is a former railway station in Los Altos, California. The station's establishment marked the beginning of the town as the Mayfield Cutoff was built through the area in 1907. Initially, Southern Pacific steam trains stopped at the two boxcars which made up the station. Additionally, the station was a stop along the interurban Peninsular Railway starting in 1909. A more permanent station building opened in 1913. Peninsular interurban cars ceased running in 1935 and commuter service ended entirely in January 1964.

After abandonment, the building was leased out as a restaurant. It was restored by the San Diego Federal Savings and Loan Association in 1973, with a boxcar and a parlor car placed in static installation to flank the building. The Los Altos Historical Commission declared the station as a historical building in 1984. The parlor car had become dilapidated by then and was sold and removed the following year. Despite its historical designation, the building again fell into disrepair and was restored and remodeled in 2014.
