= Los Altos, California =

City in California, United States

- City
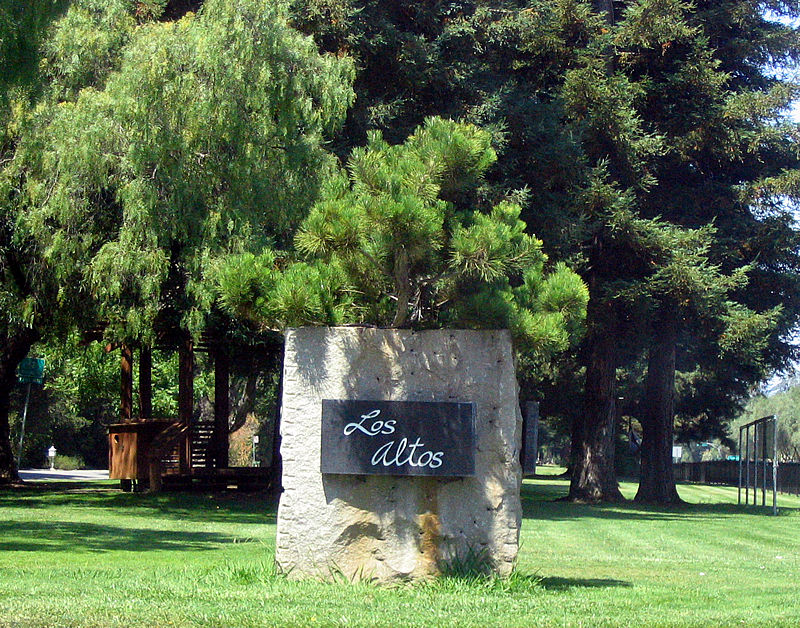
- A City of Los Altos entrance marker, located in Lincoln Park just off Main Street

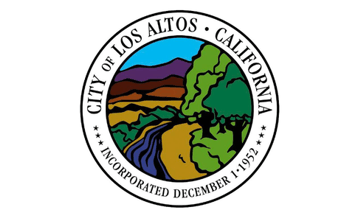
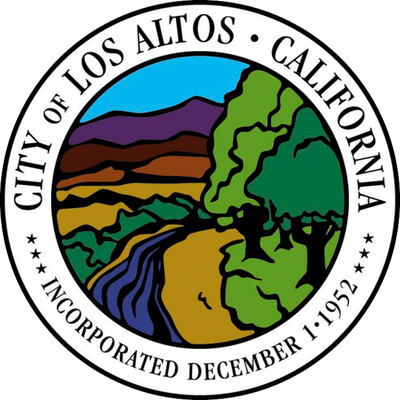
- Flag Seal
- Interactive map of Los Altos, California
- Location in California Location in the Bay Area Location in the United States
- Coordinates: 37°22′5″N 122°5′51″W
- Country: United States
- State: California
- County: Santa Clara
- Incorporated: December 1, 1952

Government
  - Type: Council/Manager
  - Mayor: Sally Meadows
  - Vice mayor: Larry Lang

Area
  - Total: 6.54 sq mi (16.94 km^{2})
  - Land: 6.54 sq mi (16.94 km^{2})
  - Water: 0 sq mi (0.00 km^{2})
- Elevation: 157 ft (48 m)

Population (2020)
  - Total: 31,625
  - Density: 4,835/sq mi (1,867/km^{2})
- Time zone: UTC−8 (Pacific Time Zone)
  - Summer (DST): UTC−7 (PDT)
- ZIP codes: 94022–94024
- Area code: 650
- FIPS code: 06-43280
- GNIS feature IDs: 1659745, 2410876
- Website: www.losaltosca.gov

Los Altos (/lɔːs ˈæltoʊs/; Spanish for "The Heights") is a city in Santa Clara County, California, United States, in the San Francisco Bay Area. The population was 31,625 according to the 2020 census.

Most of the city's growth took place between 1950 and 1980. Originally an agricultural town with many summer cottages and apricot orchards, Los Altos is a bedroom community on the western edge of Silicon Valley, serving as a major source of commuters to other parts of Silicon Valley. Los Altos strictly limits commercial zones to the downtown area and small shopping and office parks lining Foothill Expressway and El Camino Real.

== History ==
The area was initially called the Fremont Judicial Township, which was formed in 1853. Fremont Judicial Township was later unofficially called "Banks and Braes". Paul Shoup, an executive of the Southern Pacific Railroad, and his colleagues formed the Altos Land Company in 1906 and started the development of Los Altos. The company acquired 140 acres (57 ha) of land from Sarah Winchester. Shoup wanted to link Palo Alto and Los Gatos by making Los Altos a commuter town. It continued a train-a-day operation to and from San Francisco.

On April 19, 1908, Southern Pacific Railroad began running steam train service through Los Altos on the new Mayfield Cutoff with five trains per day. Two freight cars served as a train depot. Also, the first commercial building, Eschenbruecher's Hardware, was built in downtown. In 1913, the craftsman-style Los Altos train station was built at 288 First Street.

By 1949, many residents were dissatisfied with the zoning policy of Santa Clara County, and there was a constant threat of annexation by neighboring Palo Alto and Mountain View, so they decided to incorporate. Los Altos became the eleventh city in Santa Clara County on December 1, 1952.

Train service ceased operation in January 1964, and the train track became Foothill Expressway. Los Altos may have the first scientifically designed sound baffle in 1970. Santa Clara County undertook a seminal study to calculate the effects of alternate soundwall designs along Foothill Expressway. The resulting wall brought about the predicted reduction of seven to ten decibels in noise pollution levels experienced by adjacent homes.

In 1976, Apple co-founders Steve Jobs and Steve Wozniak built the first 50 Apple I computers in Jobs's garage in Los Altos.

In 2004, landlord Judy Fusco rented her Los Altos home, later known as "Casa Facebook", to Mark Zuckerberg; there, he and a few other associates scaled Facebook from 200,000 members to 2.5 million.

On April 15, 2021, Los Altos became home to the world's first consumer flying car showroom.

=== Earthquakes ===
A store in disarray following the 1989 Loma Prieta earthquake

Los Altos is near the San Andreas Fault and therefore subject to earthquakes.

- 1906 San Francisco earthquake – Although Los Altos was hit extremely hard (VIII on the intensity level), the main local effort was to help rebuild nearby Santa Cruz, which was nearly destroyed.
- 1989 Loma Prieta earthquake – On October 17, Los Altos experienced the earthquake, but was spared major damage.

== Geography ==
Los Altos is bordered by Los Altos Hills to the west, Palo Alto to the west and northwest, Mountain View to the northwest and northeast, Sunnyvale to the east, and Cupertino to the southeast.

Los Altos is crossed by three creeks that flow north to San Francisco Bay, Adobe Creek on its western boundary, Stevens Creek on its eastern boundary and Permanente Creek in the middle. Hale Creek is a tributary to Permanente Creek, and Permanente Creek is now largely diverted to Stevens Creek by a diversion channel. All three creeks originate on the flanks of Black Mountain.

== Demographics ==
Historical population
Census	Pop.	Note	%±
1960	19,696		—
1970	25,062		27.2%
1980	25,769		2.8%
1990	26,303		2.1%
2000	27,693		5.3%
2010	28,976		4.6%
2020	31,625		9.1%
U.S. Decennial Census

=== 2020 census ===
As of the 2020 census, Los Altos had a population of 31,625. The population density was 4,835.6 inhabitants per square mile (1,867.0/km^{2}). The median age was 46.5 years. The age distribution was 23.9% under the age of 18, 6.5% aged 18 to 24, 17.0% aged 25 to 44, 31.2% aged 45 to 64, and 21.4% who were 65 years of age or older. For every 100 females, there were 95.0 males, and for every 100 females age 18 and over, there were 92.3 males.

The census reported that 99.0% of the population lived in households, 0.1% lived in non-institutionalized group quarters, and 0.8% were institutionalized. 100.0% of residents lived in urban areas, while 0.0% lived in rural areas.

There were 11,162 households in Los Altos, of which 38.4% had children under the age of 18 living in them. Of all households, 69.9% were married-couple households, 2.6% were cohabiting couple households, 9.4% were households with a male householder and no spouse or partner present, and 18.1% were households with a female householder and no spouse or partner present. About 17.5% of all households were made up of individuals and 11.2% had someone living alone who was 65 years of age or older. The average household size was 2.81. There were 8,834 families (79.1% of all households).

There were 11,783 housing units at an average density of 1,801.7 units per square mile (695.6 units/km^{2}), of which 94.7% were occupied and 5.3% were vacant. Of occupied units, 79.1% were owner-occupied and 20.9% were occupied by renters. The homeowner vacancy rate was 0.5% and the rental vacancy rate was 7.1%.

Racial composition as of the 2020 census
Race	Number	Percent
White	16,958	53.6%
Black or African American	188	0.6%
American Indian and Alaska Native	43	0.1%
Asian	11,176	35.3%
Native Hawaiian and Other Pacific Islander	44	0.1%
Some other race	458	1.4%
Two or more races	2,758	8.7%
Hispanic or Latino (of any race)	1,538	4.9%

=== 2023 ACS estimates ===
In 2023, the US Census Bureau estimated that the median household income was more than $250,000, and the per capita income was $142,907. About 2.4% of families and 3.1% of the population were below the poverty line.

=== 2010 census ===
The 2010 United States census reported that Los Altos had a population of 28,976. The population density was 4466.8 people per square mile (1724.6/km^{2}). The racial makeup of Los Altos was 20,459 (70.6%) White, 148 (0.5%) African American, 48 (0.2%) Native American, 6,815 (23.5%) Asian, 59 (0.2%) Pacific Islander, 195 (0.7%) from other races, and 1,252 (4.3%) from two or more races. Hispanic or Latino of any race were 1,132 persons (3.9%).

The Census reported that 28,749 people (99.2% of the population) lived in households, 34 (0.1%) lived in non-institutionalized group quarters, and 193 (0.7%) were institutionalized.

There were 10,745 households, out of which 4,067 (37.9%) had children under the age of 18 living in them, 7,476 (69.6%) were opposite-sex married couples living together, 599 (5.6%) had a female householder with no husband present, 228 (2.1%) had a male householder with no wife present. There were 199 (1.9%) unmarried opposite-sex partnerships, and 55 (0.5%) same-sex married couples or partnerships. 2,086 households (19.4%) were made up of individuals, and 1,228 (11.4%) had someone living alone who was 65 years of age or older. The average household size was 2.68. There were 8,303 families (77.3% of all households); the average family size was 3.08.

The age distribution of the population consisted of 7,560 people (26.1%) under the age of 18, 1,006 people (3.5%) aged 18 to 24, 5,273 people (18.2%) aged 25 to 44, 9,353 people (32.3%) aged 45 to 64, and 5,784 people (20.0%) who were 65 years of age or older. The median age was 46.2 years. For every 100 females, there were 93.1 males. For every 100 females age 18 and over, there were 90.9 males.

There were 11,204 housing units at an average density of 1727.1 per square mile (666.9/km^{2}), of which 9,002 (83.8%) were owner-occupied, and 1,743 (16.2%) were occupied by renters. The homeowner vacancy rate was 0.7%; the rental vacancy rate was 5.0%. 24,669 people (85.1% of the population) lived in owner-occupied housing units and 4,080 people (14.1%) lived in rental housing units.

=== 2010s economic data ===
The median household income of Los Altos for 2013–2017 was $208,309. The average home listing price in 2014 was $1.96 million. In 2017, Forbes ranked Los Altos (94022 and 94024) as the 3rd and 48th most expensive ZIP codes in the United States with median home prices of $7,755,000 and $3,431,615, respectively. In 2018, data from the American Community Survey revealed that Los Altos was the fifth wealthiest city in the United States.

=== 1930 ===
Approximately 2,900 people would have considered themselves a resident of Los Altos.

=== Housing costs ===
Los Altos strives to maintain a semi-rural atmosphere. Los Altos has few sidewalks except in commercial zones and along arterial roads. The minimum lot size for most residential housing is one-quarter of an acre. Most streets have broad dirt shoulders and no street lighting. The civic center sits in the middle of an orchard, a remnant of those that once covered the area. The downtown is a triangle with arterials and collector streets on all sides that enable most through traffic to bypass Main Street.

As of today, many Los Altos homes fetch $4 million and higher. The city is placed (along with neighboring Los Altos Hills, with which it shares ZIP codes) at numbers 24 and 28 on Forbes' "Most Expensive ZIP Codes in America" list in 2007. In 2015, Forbes placed Los Altos (ZIP codes 94022 and 94024) as the 11th and 57th most expensive ZIP codes in the United States, behind such cities as Atherton, California and Sagaponack, New York. For the 94022 ZIP code, which includes parts of Los Altos Hills, California the median home price is $4.9 million with an average of 120 days on the market. For the 94024 ZIP code, the median home price is $2.8 million with an average of 36 days on the market.

== Economy ==
Since the mid-1990s, downtown Los Altos has experienced mild economic difficulties due to competition from nearby shopping centers and chain stores, as well as its lack of a hotel or movie theater. Revitalizing downtown is a major issue in city politics.

=== Top employers ===
According to the City's 2022 Annual Comprehensive Financial Report, the top employers in the city are:

Top employers in Los Altos
#	Employer	# of Employees
1	Los Altos School District	459
2	Los Altos Sub-Acute & Rehabilitation Center	241
3	Whole Foods Market	233
4	Los Altos High School	212
5	Toyota Research Institute	187
6	Compass, Inc. (Alain Pinel Realtors)	166
7	David and Lucile Packard Foundation	131
8	City of Los Altos	120
9	Adobe Animal Hospital	120
10	Palo Alto Medical Foundation	110

== Government ==
In the California State Legislature, Los Altos is in the 13th senatorial district, represented by Democrat Josh Becker, and in the 23rd Assembly district, represented by Democrat Marc Berman.

In the United States House of Representatives, Los Altos is in California's 16th congressional district, represented by Democrat Sam Liccardo.

== Education ==
=== Public ===
Most of Los Altos is in the Los Altos Elementary School District and the Mountain View-Los Altos Union High School District. A portion of it is in the Cupertino Union Elementary School District and the Fremont Union High School District. The Los Altos School District has one of the highest average API scores in California and includes seven elementary schools in the Los Altos–Mountain View area.

Los Altos has the Bullis Charter School, a K-8 charter school.

As of 1995 all of the public schools are highly regarded, and many graduates of Los Altos-area high schools continue their education at well-known universities.

=== Private ===
Los Altos is also served by highly regarded private and religious schools. St. Nicholas School, St. Simon School, Miramonte Elementary School, (JrK–8th) Canterbury Christian School (Pre-K–8th), the Lower and Middle Campuses (K–6th) of Pinewood School, The School for Independent Learners, and the lower school campus of the Waldorf School of the Peninsula are located within city limits. Others nearby include St. Francis High School (Mountain View), Mountain View Academy, and The King's Academy (Sunnyvale). Other schools farther away with students from Los Altos include Sacred Heart Schools, Atherton, Mitty High School, Menlo School, Woodside Priory School, Castilleja School, The Harker School, and Bellarmine College Preparatory.

=== Public libraries ===
Santa Clara County Library operates the Los Altos Library and the Woodland Branch Library in Los Altos. Members of the library have access to all the other locations in the Santa Clara County Library District.

== Parks and recreation ==
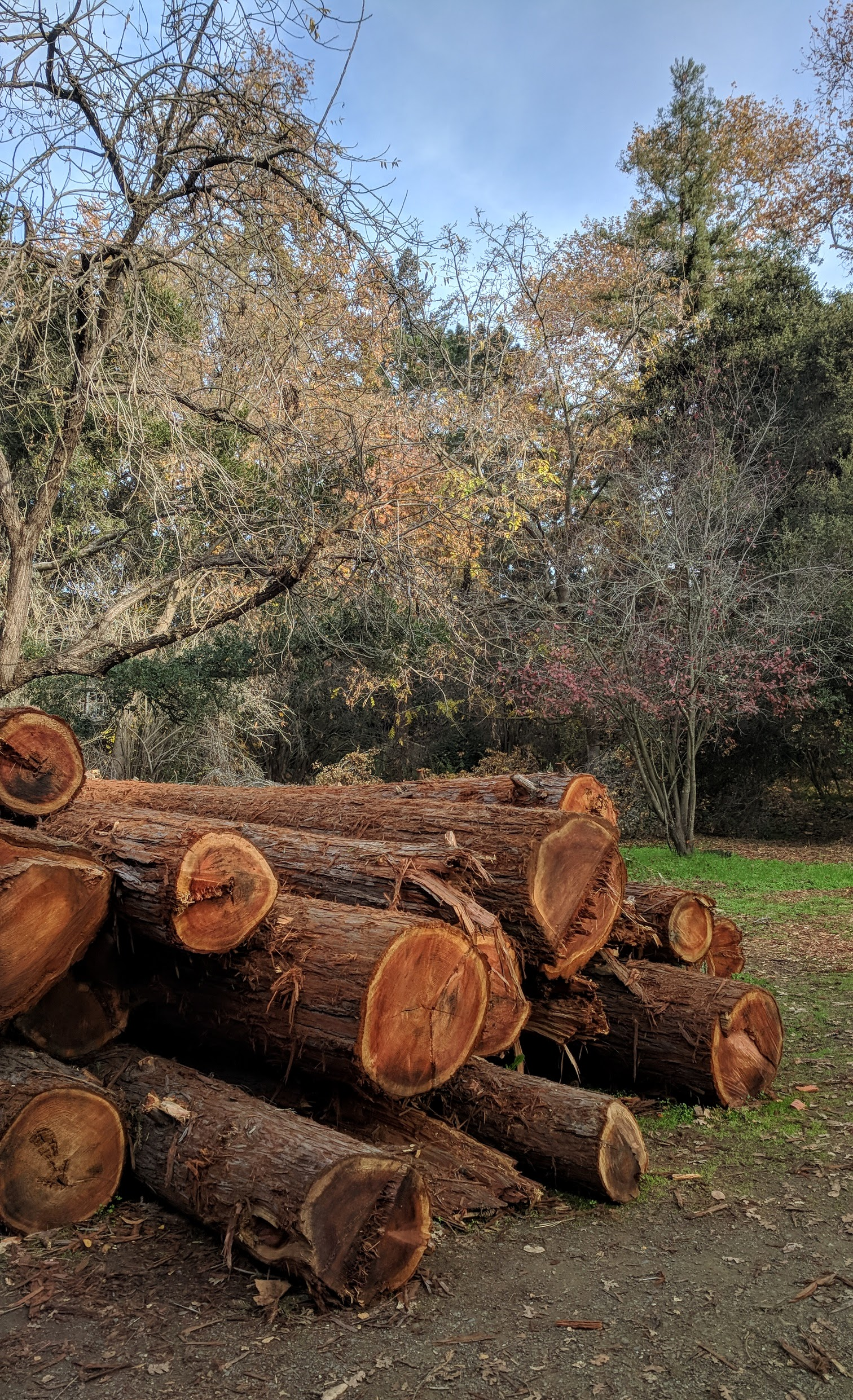
Dead and diseased trees in the Redwood Grove were cut down in 2017, to be milled on-site in 2018.

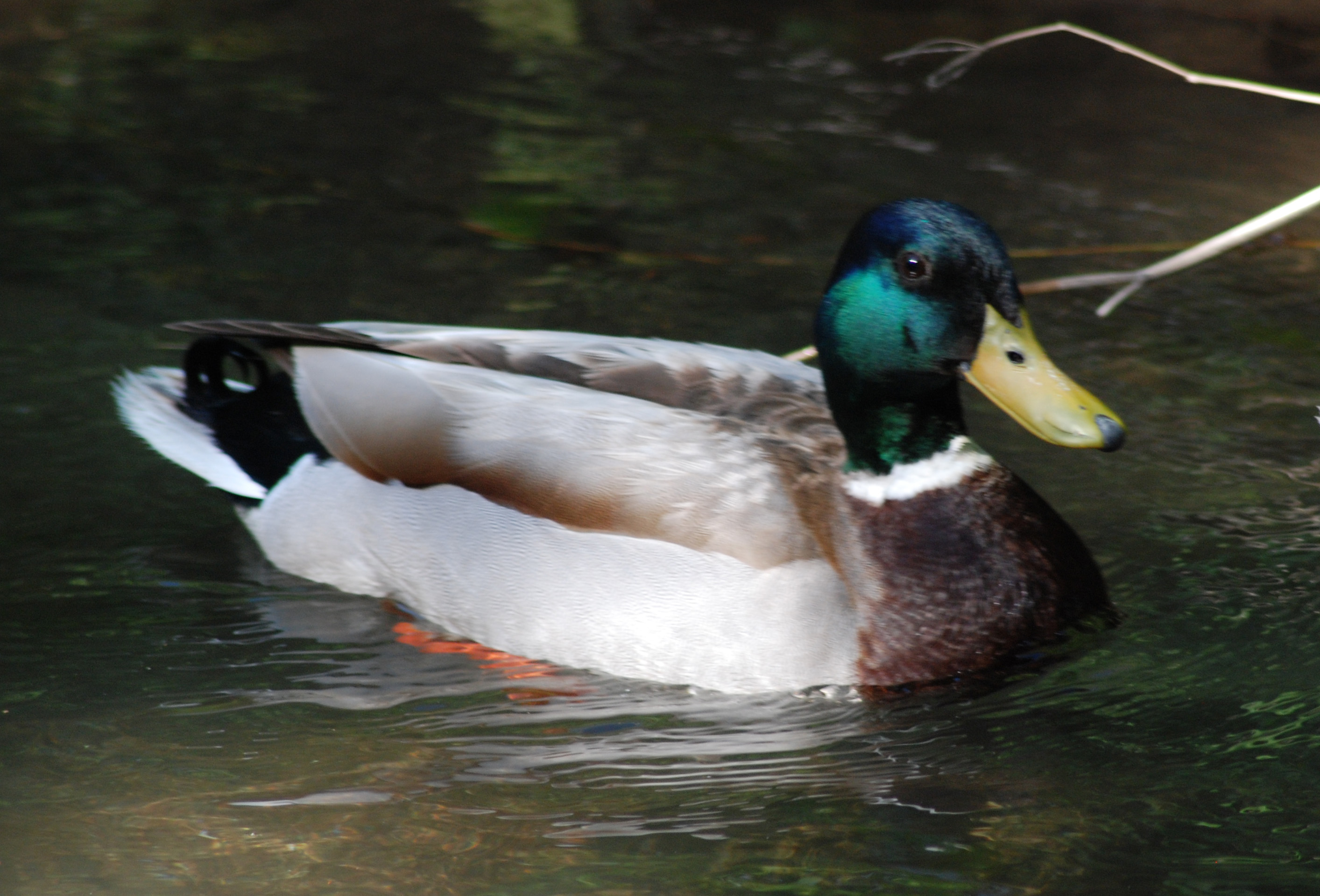
Mallard in May 2010, in Adobe Creek; the creek typically runs dry by summer.

Adobe Creek flows through Redwood Grove, a 5.9-acre (2.4 ha) nature preserve off University Avenue in Los Altos purchased by the city in 1974. In October 2009 Los Altos contracted with Acterra to remove non-native plants and revitalize the redwood, oak woodland, riparian and grassland ecosystems by installing native plants, improving soil conditions, and creating habitat for wildlife such as bird houses and native bee boxes. The coast redwoods (Sequoia sempervirens) were transplanted by the Halsey family from a location on Summit Road in the Santa Cruz Mountains and replaced the native willows. The historic Halsey House, built in the late 1920s by Theodore and Emma Halsey, is a good example of Spanish Revival architecture. The city designated Halsey House a local landmark in 1981 and until recently it housed the Florence Fava collection of Coastanoan or Ohlone Indian artifacts from a nearby archeological excavation in Los Altos Hills (now moved to the Los Altos History Museum). On June 16, 2010, the Los Altos City Council finalized the purchase of 10,000 square feet (930 m^{2}) of creekside property from Delbert and Marlene Beumer, who wanted to provide a safe pathway connecting Shoup Park and Redwood Grove.

Steelhead trout (Oncorhynchus mykiss) occurred historically in Adobe Creek. However, tidal gates at the mouth of Adobe Creek as well as culverts at the El Camino Real and Interstate 280 overpasses probably preclude the passage of migrating salmonids, even though the reaches upstream from Hidden Villa in Los Altos Hills have been judged excellent trout habitat.

=== Sports ===
Los Altos has a variety of youth-oriented sports organizations, programs, and after-school activities. Some examples include:

- The Mountain View Los Altos Soccer Club (MVLASC) has provided competitive soccer for the MVLA community since 1972. It is a member of the California Youth Soccer Association – North (Cal North Soccer) and plays in the Foothill Youth Soccer League. The club has won 14 State Championships and two National Championships.
- Los Altos–Mountain View Pony Baseball is for boys and girls aged 5 to 19. It is the largest youth baseball program in the San Francisco Bay Area, and a chartered league of PONY Baseball, Inc.
- West Valley Pop Warner offers cheerleading and football programs to local youth.
- The El Camino YMCA Youth Basketball League teaches basic basketball skills and the YMCA's core values.

== Media ==
The Los Altos Town Crier, a weekly, is the primary newspaper for the town, "serving the Hometown of Silicon Valley since 1947." The San Jose Mercury News is the primary daily newspaper serving the town, delivering a Peninsula Section to Los Altans and locations north in lieu of the Local section delivered to those in San Jose and other communities closer to San Jose.

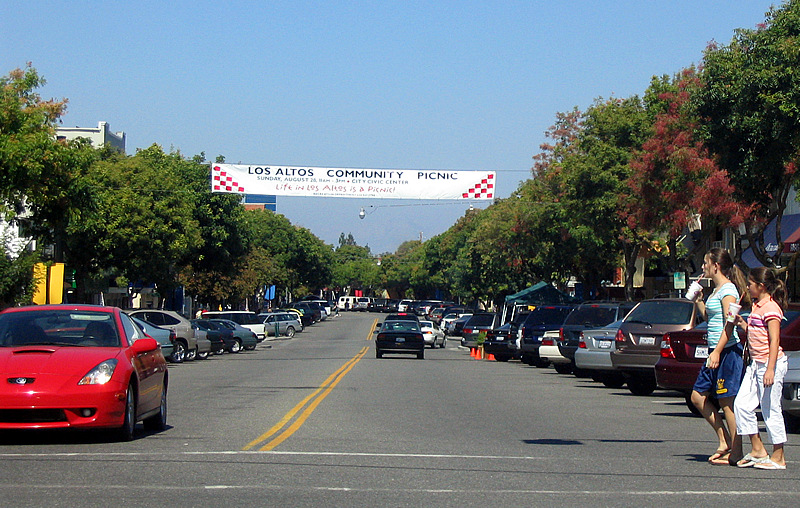
An intersection in downtown Los Altos, with features like tree-lined sidewalks, diagonal parking, small shops, and banners advertising community events

== Notable people ==
- Allan Bakke, student who challenged the practice of affirmative action in the 1978 landmark Supreme Court decision Regents of the University of California v. Bakke
- Sergey Brin, co-founder of Google
- The Chocolate Watchband, garage-rock band formed in 1965
- Jon M. Chu, director, producer and screenwriter. Director of 2018's Crazy Rich Asians
- Alan Cranston, former United States Senator from California, Senate Majority Whip, Senate Minority Whip, Controller of California, and member of the Keating Five
- Bjarne Dahl (1897–1989), mid-century architect active in Honolulu, Hawaii
- Jerry P. Eaton, American geologist, died in Los Altos
- Lorrie Fair, retired soccer player
- Dennis "Thresh" Fong, businessman and professional gamer of the Quake series
- Leslie Fu, YouTube streamer
- Charles Geschke, co-founder of Adobe Systems
- Jesse Grant, son of the 18th President of the United States, Ulysses S. Grant
- Andrew Grove, co-founder and former CEO of Intel
- John Lee Hooker, world-renowned blues guitarist, died at his home in Los Altos on June 21, 2001.
- Juli Inkster, LPGA golfer
- Steve Jobs, co-founder of Apple Inc.
- Andrew L. Lewis, US Navy Vice-Admiral and Commander, United States Second Fleet
- Janet Lewis, author and poet, died at her home in Los Altos at the age of 99 on December 1, 1998.
- Jack Melchor, venture capitalist
- William E. Moerner, 2014 recipient of the Nobel Prize in Chemistry
- Robert Noyce, co-founder of Fairchild Semiconductor and Intel Corporation
- Sundar Pichai, Chief Executive Officer of Google.
- Michele Raffin, writer and founder of Pandemonium Aviaries
- Fred Ramsdell, 2025 Nobel Laureate in Physiology and Medicine
- Mary G. Ross, the first Native American female engineer
- General Oliver P. Smith, served as Assistant Commandant of the Marine Corps and Commanding General of the 1st Marine Division during the Inchon Landings and Chosin Reservoir Campaign of the Korean War.
- Alejandro Toledo, 63rd President of Peru
- John Edward Walker, California Impressionist painter, lived in Los Altos in the 1920s.
- John Warnock, co-founder of Adobe Systems
- Yvor Winters, California poet, 34-year resident from 1934.
- Ed Zschau, former congressman for California's 12th district

== Sister cities ==
Los Altos had four sister cities, as designated by Sister Cities International:

- Bendigo, Australia
- Syktyvkar, Russia
- Shilin, Taiwan
- (United Kingdom) Rustington, England

The program was run by the non-profit Los Altos Sister Cities, Inc., founded in 1988. That organization later decided to cease its participation and is now dissolved. Los Altos no longer participates in the sister cities program.
