= San Antonio station (Caltrain) =

Train station in Mountain View, California, U.S.

San Antonio
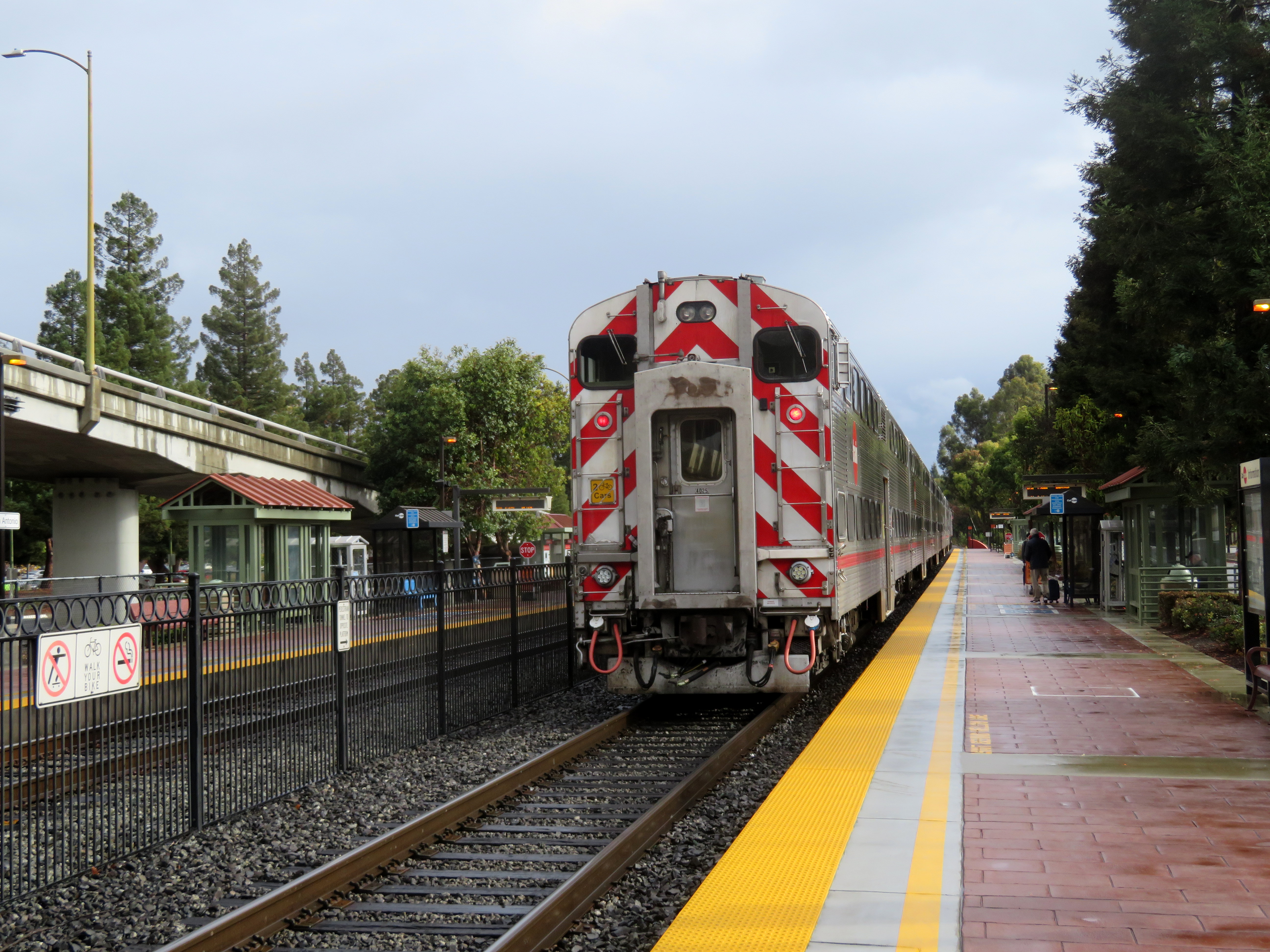
- A southbound train leaving San Antonio station in 2018

General information
- Location: 190 Showers Drive; Mountain View, California
- Coordinates: 37°24′26″N 122°06′25″W
- Owner: Peninsula Corridor Joint Powers Board (PCJPB)
- Line: PCJPB Peninsula Subdivision
- Platforms: 2 side platforms
- Tracks: 2
- Connections: VTA: 21

Construction
- Parking: 199 spaces; paid
- Cycle facilities: 18 racks and 38 lockers
- Accessible: Yes

Other information
- Fare zone: 3

History
- Opened: April 18, 1999

Passengers
- FY 2025: 655 (weekday avg.) ▲58%

Services
Preceding station	Caltrain	Following station
California Avenue toward San Francisco	Local	Mountain View toward San Jose Diridon or Tamien
California Avenue toward San Francisco	Limited	Mountain View toward San Jose Diridon
California Avenue toward San Francisco	Weekend Local	Mountain View toward San Jose Diridon or Tamien
Express does not stop here
Former services
Preceding station	Caltrain	Following station
California Avenue toward San Francisco	Local (L1)	Mountain View toward San Jose Diridon or Tamien
California Avenue toward San Francisco	Weekend Local (L2)	Mountain View toward San Jose Diridon or Tamien
California Avenue toward San Francisco	Limited (L3)	Mountain View toward San Jose Diridon, Tamien or Gilroy
Location

San Antonio station is a Caltrain commuter rail station located in Mountain View, California. The station has two side platforms serving the two tracks of the Peninsula Subdivision, with a pedestrian tunnel at the south end.

The station opened on April 18, 1999; it supplemented and ultimately replaced Castro station, which was located 0.8 miles (1.3 km) to the south at Rengstorff Avenue.
