= Mountain View station (California) =

Train station in Mountain View, California, U.S.

Mountain View
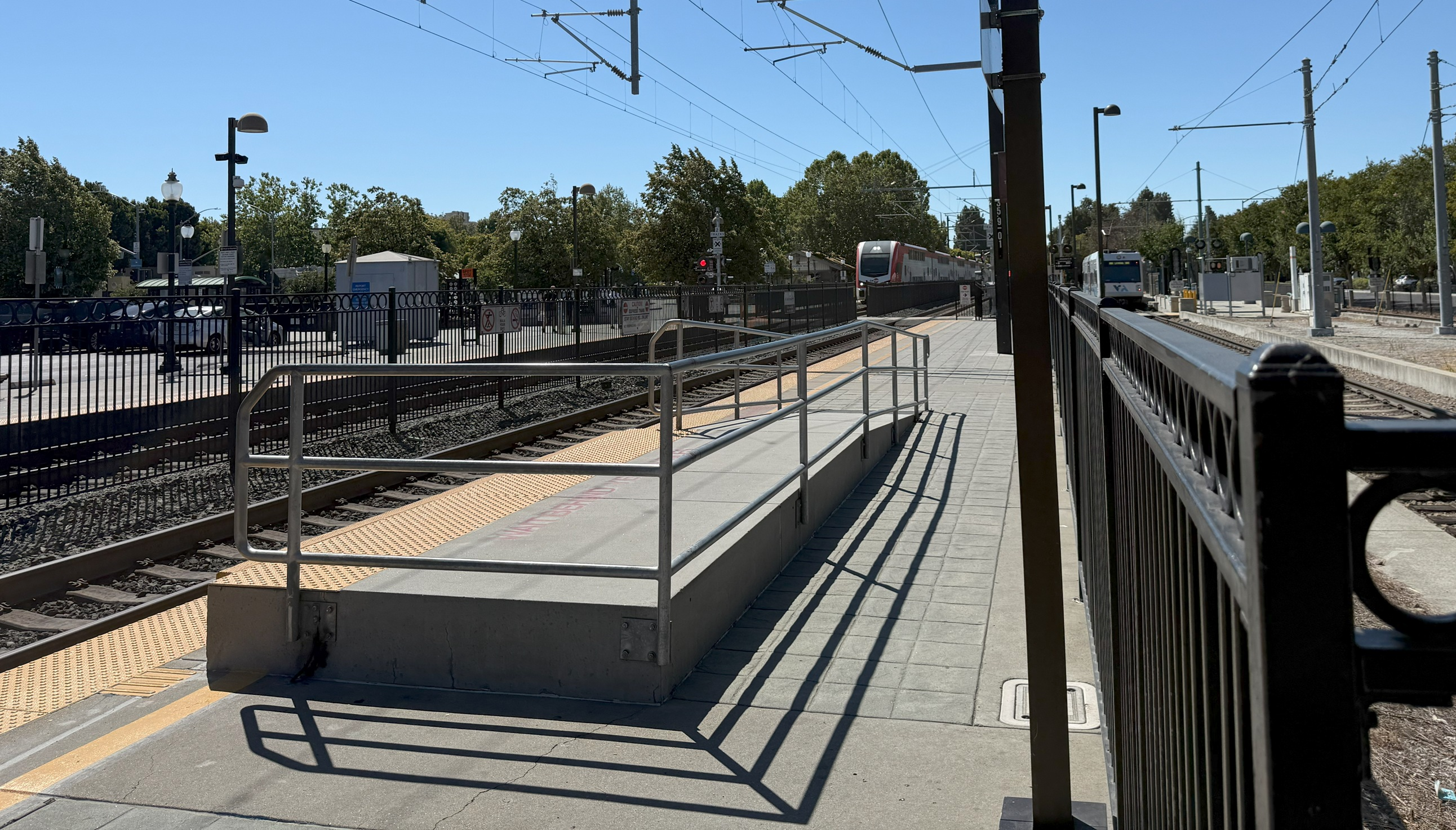
- Caltrain and VTA platforms in 2025

General information
- Location: 600 West Evelyn Avenue; Mountain View, California
- Coordinates: 37°23′40″N 122°04′33″W
- Line: PCJPB Peninsula Subdivision
- Platforms: 2 side platforms (Caltrain); 1 island platform (VTA)
- Tracks: 2 (Caltrain); 2 (VTA)
- Connections: VTA Bus: 21, 40, 51, 52; MV Community Shuttle: Grey, Red; MVgo: A, B, C, D

Construction
- Structure type: At-grade
- Parking: 338 spaces
- Cycle facilities: 23 racks, lockers
- Accessible: Yes

Other information
- Fare zone: 3 (Caltrain)

History
- Opened: 1888 (Caltrain); December 20, 1999 (VTA)
- Rebuilt: 1987, 2000 (Caltrain)

Passengers
- FY 2025: 2,288 (weekday avg.) ▲34%

Services
Preceding station	Caltrain	Following station
San Antonio toward San Francisco	Local	Sunnyvale toward San Jose Diridon or Tamien
San Antonio toward San Francisco	Limited	Sunnyvale toward San Jose Diridon
Palo Alto toward San Francisco	Express	Sunnyvale toward San Jose Diridon
San Antonio toward San Francisco	Weekend Local	Sunnyvale toward San Jose Diridon or Tamien
Preceding station	VTA	Following station
Terminus	Orange Line	Whisman toward Alum Rock
Former services
Preceding station	Caltrain	Following station
San Antonio toward San Francisco	Local (L1)	Sunnyvale toward San Jose Diridon or Tamien
San Antonio toward San Francisco	Weekend Local (L2)	Sunnyvale toward San Jose Diridon or Tamien
San Antonio toward San Francisco	Limited (L3)	Sunnyvale toward San Jose Diridon, Tamien or Gilroy
Palo Alto toward San Francisco	Limited (L4)	Sunnyvale toward San Jose Diridon, Tamien or Gilroy
Palo Alto toward San Francisco	Limited (L5)	Sunnyvale toward San Jose Diridon or Tamien
Palo Alto toward San Francisco	Baby Bullet (B7)	San Jose Diridon Terminus
Preceding station	VTA	Following station
Terminus	Orange Line	Evelyn (closed 2015) toward Alum Rock
Preceding station	Southern Pacific Railroad	Following station
Castro toward San Francisco	Coast Line	Sunnyvale toward Los Angeles
Location

Mountain View station is an intermodal transit station providing public bus and rail service, located in Mountain View, California. The station is served by the Caltrain commuter rail line, as well as the Orange Line of the VTA light rail system. VTA local transit bus and employer-operated shuttle services are accommodated from the Mountain View Transit Center on the Evelyn Avenue side of the station. Peninsula Commute rail service to Mountain View was added with the construction of the depot by Southern Pacific in 1888.

== Configuration ==
The station site is bounded by Evelyn Avenue (along the south-southwest side), Castro Street (along the west-northwest side), and Central Expressway (along the north-northeast side), aka Santa Clara County Route G6. Central Expressway and Evelyn both run parallel to both the Caltrain and VTA rail lines in this area. Arranged east-southeast along Evelyn, away from the intersection with Castro, is first Centennial Plaza, then the Transit Center (bus) facility, followed by the public pay-parking lot for the entire intermodal facility. Parking is managed by Caltrain; the main entrance is at Evelyn Avenue & View Street.

Mountain View is the western terminus of the Orange Line route. The VTA's light rail station uses a single island platform which can be accessed from Castro Street, near its intersection with the Central Expressway, or through an at-grade rail crossing from the north/east end of the northbound Caltrain platform. Caltrain operates from two side platforms at Mountain View; the southbound platform can be accessed from Castro (via a walkway on north side of the replica depot), Centennial Plaza, the Transit Center, and the parking facility, while the northbound platform can be accessed by at-grade crossings at the north and south ends of the platform. Fences prevent direct access to the VTA and Caltrain platforms from Central Expressway, as pedestrians would have to cross the VTA lines.

Centennial Plaza, at the corner of Evelyn and Castro, contains a replica depot building that was constructed in 2000 to pay homage to the original Southern Pacific Railroad station, which was built in 1888 and demolished in 1959. The replica depot now houses a wine bar/shop.

Two pieces of public art were added during the construction of the light rail line.

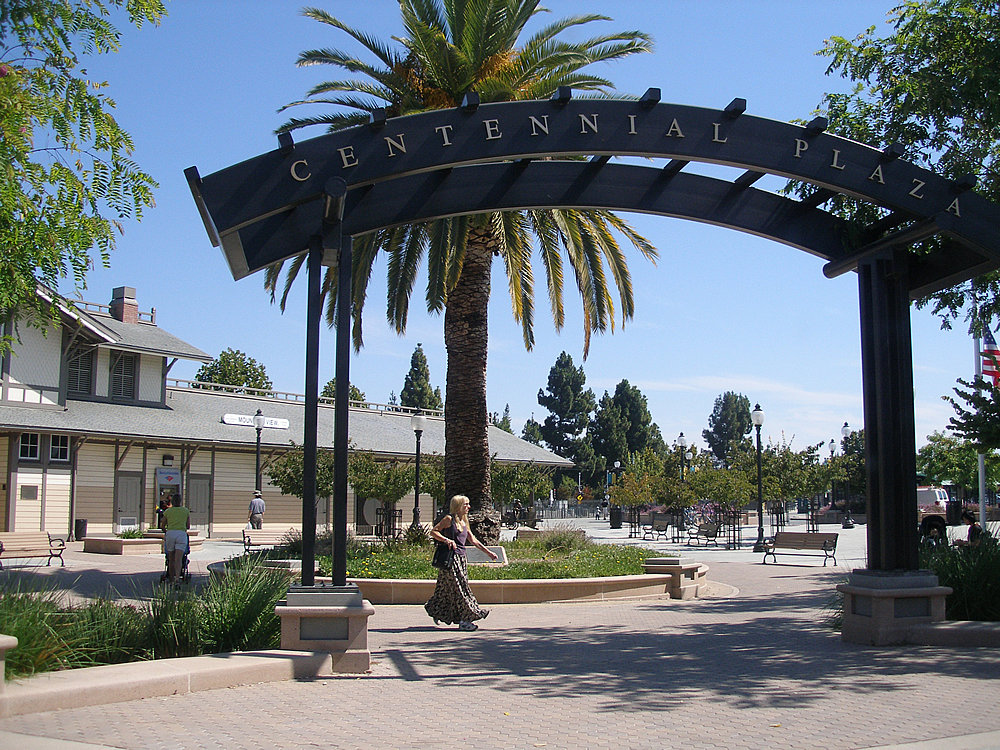
Centennial Plaza

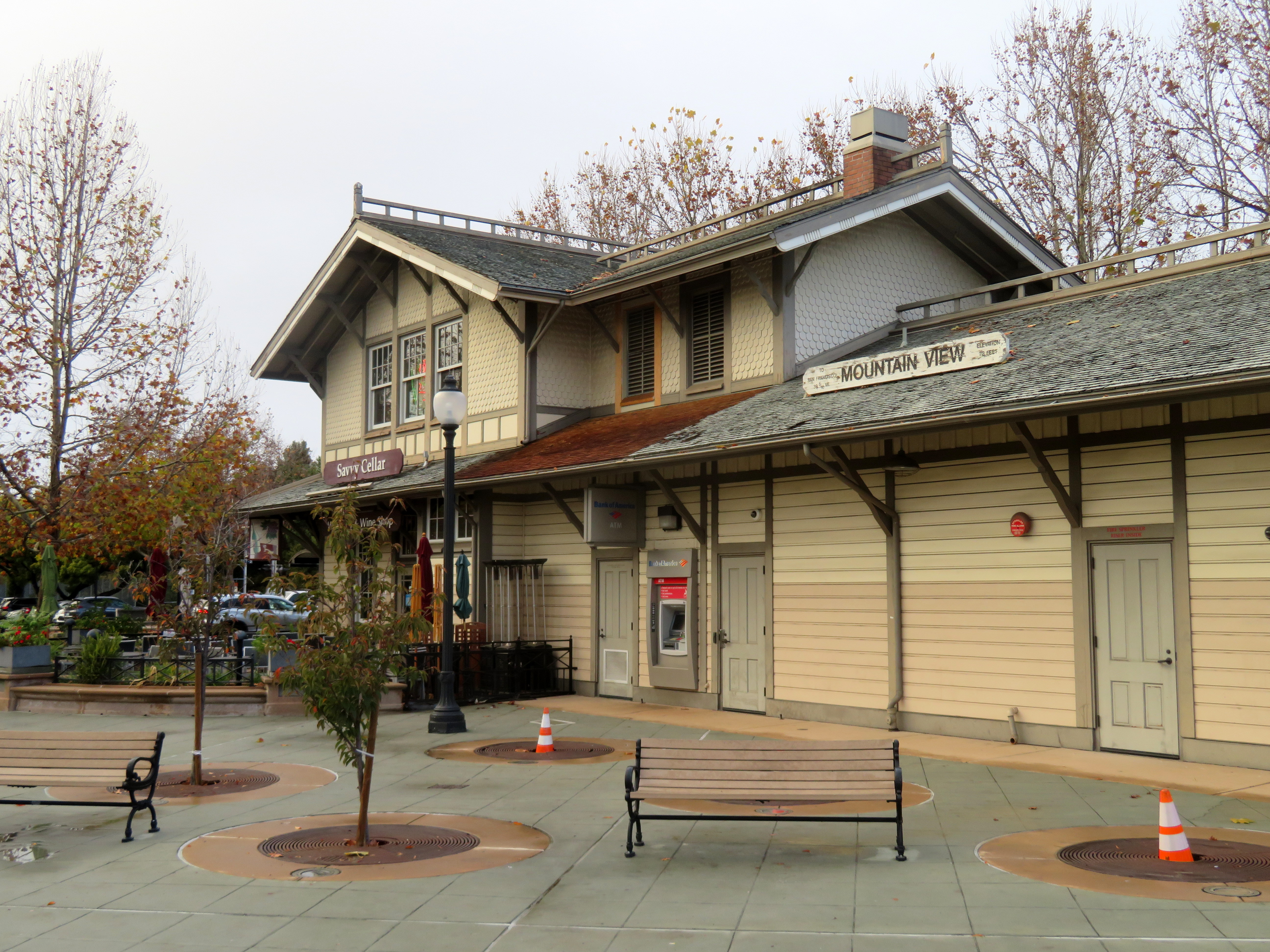
Replica station building

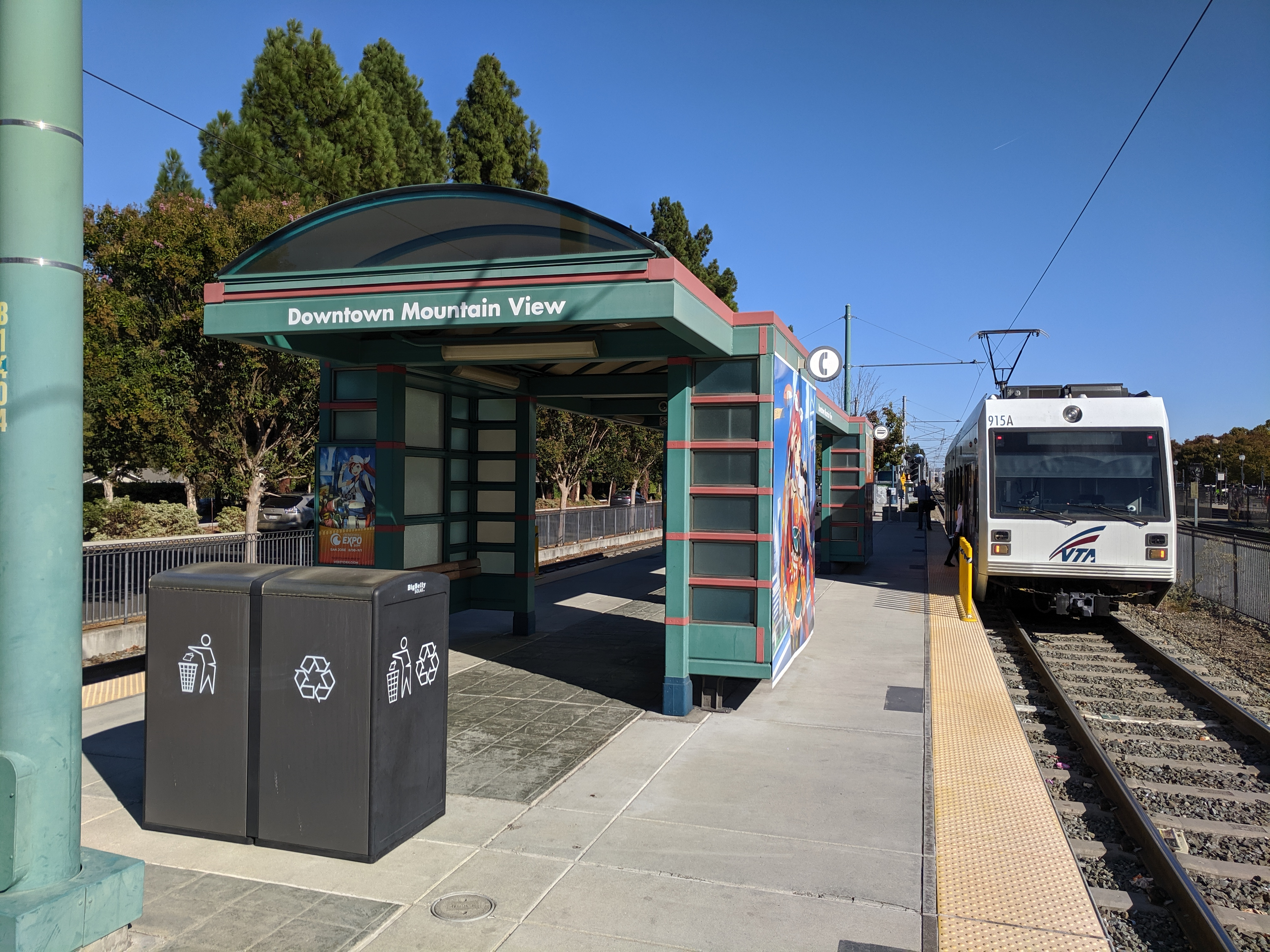
VTA light rail platform

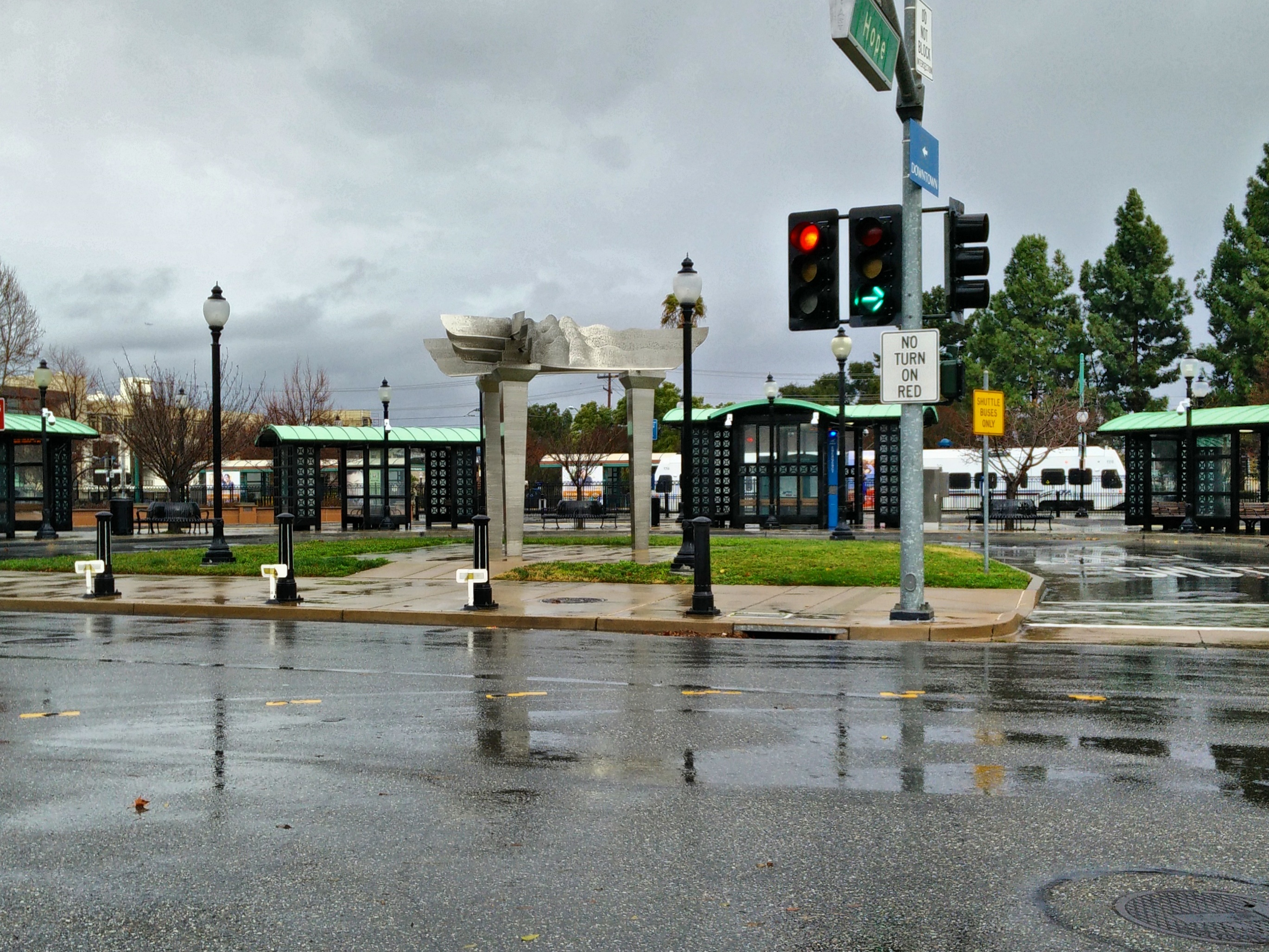
Bus terminal

=== Castro grade separation project ===
Four alternatives for the Castro Street grade crossing were proposed and studied in 2016 and 2017:

Grade Crossing alternatives in the MVTC Master Plan
	Alt.1	Alt.2	Alt.3	Alt.4
Castro / Moffett	Depress below rails and Central	Depress below rails	Depress below rails and Central	Disconnect, redirect traffic along Evelyn to Shoreline
Central Expy	At-grade (no significant changes)	Depress below rails	At-grade, add median ramps to Castro / Moffett	At-grade (no significant changes)
Rail (Caltrain)	At-grade (no significant changes)	At-grade (no significant changes)		At-grade (no significant changes)
Est. cost	US$105–120 M	Not evaluated		US$40–45 M

The city of Mountain View adopted the Mountain View Transit Center (MVTC) Master Plan in May 2017, which recommended Alternative 4. This plan would double the size of the existing Centennial Plaza from 17,000 to 40,000 ft^{2} (1,600 to 3,700 m^{2}), expand the bus and shuttle transfer area, and increase the number of parking spaces for bicycles and cars. The at-grade vehicle rail crossing along Castro Street would be removed; northbound vehicles on Castro would be redirected west along Evelyn to a new ramp connecting to Shoreline Boulevard. Vehicles would use a below-grade ramp set in the median of Central Expressway to access a new. two-level underground parking garage south of the tracks along Evelyn.

The at-grade pedestrian rail crossings also would be eliminated. Pedestrians and bicycles would use a new undercrossing to the Transit Center from the northwest and northeast corners of the intersection at Moffett and Central, connecting underground to the north/east ends of the VTA platform and Caltrain platforms, and continuing on to Centennial Plaza. A second undercrossing would provide access to the south/west ends of the Caltrain platforms, connecting those ends to the bus transit center and underground parking garage.

The cost of all the improvements was estimated at US$182 M; the prior estimate of $40–45 M for Alternative 4 had included only the closure of Castro, added ramp to Shoreline from Evelyn, and pedestrian undercrossings along Castro.

The final design contract was awarded by the Peninsula Corridor Joint Powers Board to HNTB in May 2022. The construction contract was awarded in May 2023 to a joint venture formed by Stacy Witbeck and Myers & Sons. Final design is scheduled to be completed in summer 2024, with construction commencing immediately afterward and completing by 2026.
