= Castro station (Caltrain) =

Castro
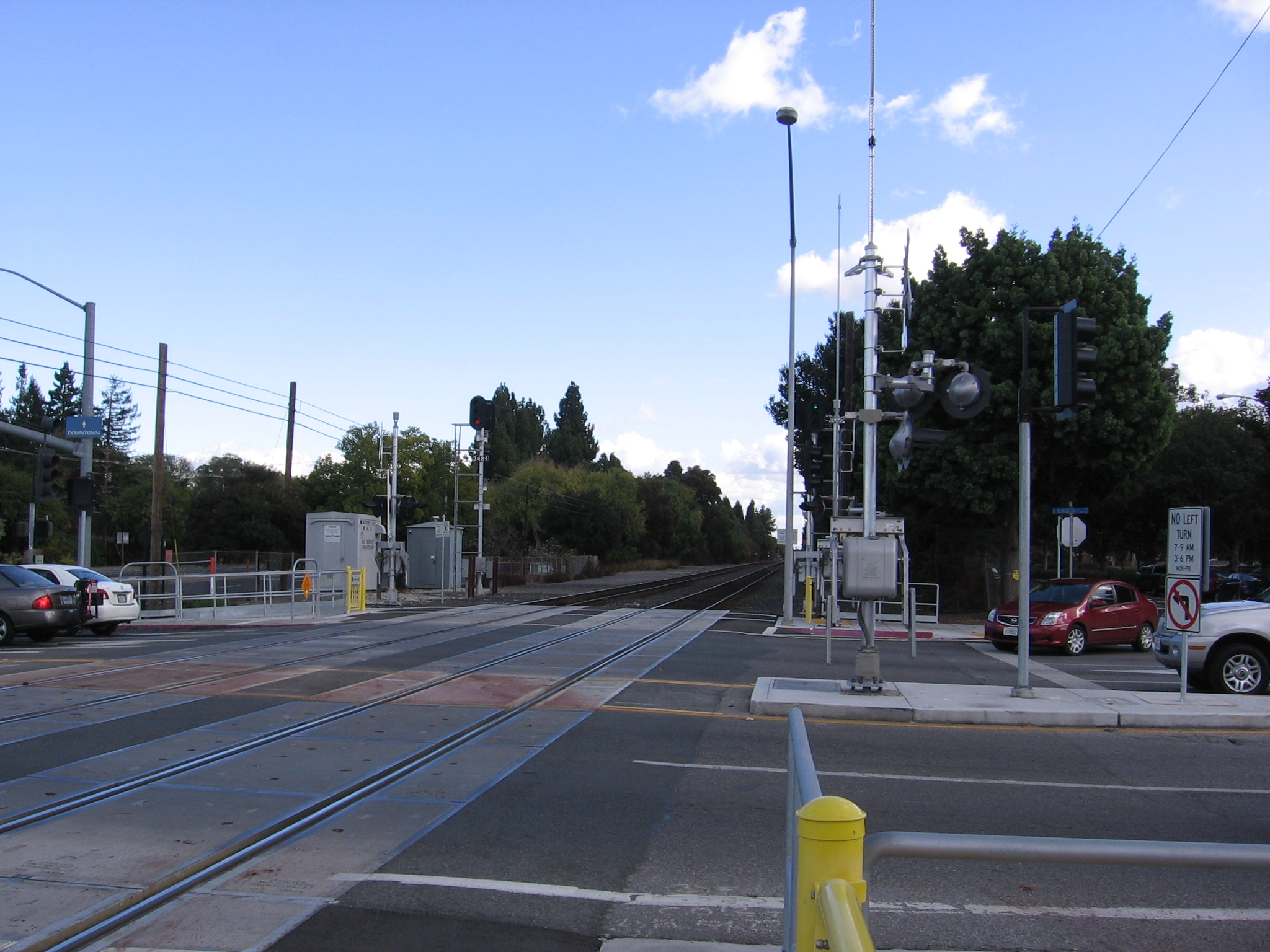
- Former station site in 2012

General information
- Location: Crisanto Avenue near Rengstorff Avenue; Mountain View, California
- Coordinates: 37°24′10″N 122°05′49″W
- Owner: Peninsula Corridor Joint Powers Board (PCJPB)
- Line: PCJPB Peninsula Subdivision

Other information
- Fare zone: 3

History
- Closed: February 6, 2000
- Original company: Southern Pacific

Passengers
- February 2000: 111 daily boardings

Former service
Preceding station	Caltrain	Following station
San Antonio toward San Francisco	Local	Mountain View toward San Jose Diridon or Tamien
Preceding station	Southern Pacific Railroad	Following station
California Avenue toward San Francisco	Coast Line	Mountain View toward Los Angeles
Location

Castro station was a Caltrain station located in Mountain View, California, just south of the railroad crossing at Rengstorff Avenue. It was replaced by the newer San Antonio station, which opened 0.8 miles (1.3 km) to the north in April 1999.

After boardings at Castro were cut in half by the newer station opening, Castro was closed on February 6, 2000.
