= Mayfield Cutoff =

Railway Line in Santa Clara County, California

The Mayfield Cutoff (also called the Los Altos Branch or Vasona Line) was a branch line of the Southern Pacific Railroad in Santa Clara County, California. It branched from the Coast Division mainline at California Avenue in Mayfield (now part of Palo Alto) and ran south to Vasona Junction where it met the South Pacific Coast Railway. The southern segment remains in use for freight trains.

== Background ==
The rail line was constructed by the Southern Pacific Railroad between 1906 and 1908. Some of the right of way was shared with an electrified track used by the Peninsular Railway between 1909 and 1933. It was built as a vessel to open up the west side of Santa Clara Valley for development and to reduce the travel distance between Santa Cruz and San Francisco. The line saw passenger service as a branch of the Peninsula Commute, which ran between Los Altos and Los Gatos via the cutoff. Service along the northern segment of the line ended in early 1964, though the tracks temporarily remained pending a federal ruling. The rails north of Permanente Junction were removed and much of the right of way reused for the Foothill Expressway, which was under construction by 1966. Kaiser Cement Corporation had a private spur from the line leading to their Permanente Quarry. The plant remains active (though is planned to close) and tracks continue to be used for freight as part of the Union Pacific Vasona Industrial Lead. The former line is the preferred west-side routing for future VTA light rail expansion.

Animated alternation between USGS maps from 1965 and 1969 showing the Mayfield Cutoff being replaced by the Foothill Expressway and removed south of Hansen Way (lower right of frame)
