= Mountain View High School (Mountain View, California) =

Coordinates: 37°21′36″N 122°04′03″W

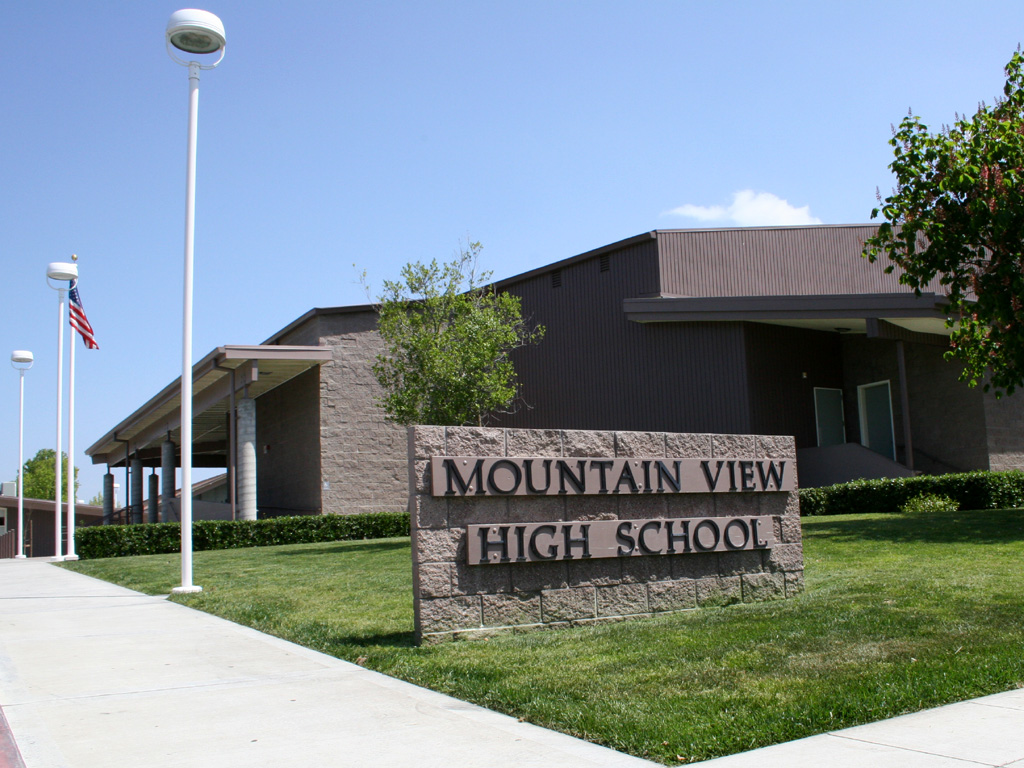
- MVHS theater and entrance

Location
- 3535 Truman Avenue; Mountain View, California 94040; United States

Information
- Type: Public
- School district: MVLAUHD
- Superintendent: Eric Volta
- Principal: Kip Glazer
- Teaching staff: 114.42 (on an FTE basis)
- Grades: 9–12
- Enrollment: 2,187 (2024-2025)
- Student to teacher ratio: 19.24
- Campus: Open
- Color
- Mascot: Spartans
- Newspaper: The Oracle
- Website: Mountain View High School

Mountain View High School (MVHS) is located at 3535 Truman Avenue, Mountain View, California, 94040. It is one of two Mountain View-Los Altos Union High School District public high schools - the other being Los Altos High School, located adjacently to the south. The three main feeder schools are Graham Middle School, Crittenden Middle School, and Blach Intermediate School.

== History ==
Education in Mountain View dates to 1858, but the community did not have a local high school until the early twentieth century. Prior to 1902, students seeking secondary education traveled by train to attend Palo Alto High School or Santa Clara High School. In 1902, Mountain View opened its first high school at the intersection of present-day El Camino Real and Calderón Avenue. The school’s original colors were blue and gray, and its mascot was the eagle.

As Mountain View grew following World War I, the original campus became insufficient to serve the increasing student population. In 1924, a larger campus opened on Castro Street. Over the following years, additional facilities were added, including an auditorium and gymnasium. Enrollment increased further after the opening of Moffett Field in 1933, as the school began admitting children of military personnel stationed in the area.

Following the attack on Pearl Harbor on December 7, 1941, Japanese American students were removed from the school in accordance with Executive Order 9066 and sent to internment camps. After World War II, Mountain View experienced significant population growth during the postwar baby boom. New high schools opened within the district, including Los Altos High School in 1956 and Awalt High School in 1961.

In 1981, the original Mountain View High School closed due to declining enrollment. Awalt High School subsequently adopted the Mountain View High School name while retaining its Spartan mascot. Los Altos High School discontinued use of its Knights mascot. In later decades, Mountain View High School received national recognition in various high school rankings. In 2016, the school received national media attention following controversy surrounding a classroom lesson by a social studies teacher that compared then-presidential candidate Donald Trump to a dictator.

== Statistics ==
=== Awards and ranking ===
The school earned the distinction of California Distinguished High School in 1988, 1994, and 2003. In 2000, 2007, 2013, and 2019, MVHS received a full 6-year accreditation from the Western Association of Schools and Colleges (WASC). The school sent 95% of its graduating class of 2019 to post-secondary schools. In addition, the California Department of Education recognized Mountain View High School as a California Gold Ribbon School, citing its "Equal Opportunities Schools" program that identifies and supports first generation students taking rigorous academic courses. Newsweek ranked Mountain View High School as the 293rd best public open enrollment high school in the nation in 2005 and the 280th best school in 2015.

=== Demographics ===
Mountain View High School serves a diverse student body of over 2000 students from the cities of Mountain View, Los Altos and Los Altos Hills. As of 2025–2026 school year, the enrollment at Mountain View High School was 2,187. During the 2025-2026 school year, the students were 33.8% White, 21.6% Hispanic, 30.9% Asian/Pacific Islander, 1.4% Black, <1% American Indian/Alaskan Native, and 12.3% two or more races.

=== Standardized testing ===
SAT Scores for 2019–2020
| | Math Average | Writing Average |
|---|---|---|
| Mountain View High School | 652 | 633 |
| District | 650 | 632 |
| Statewide | 534 | 531 |

== Classes ==
The high school holds an open enrollment policy: any student may register for any class being offered at the school, regardless of a student's grade. Mountain View High, like most Bay Area schools, offers all 8 of the AP advanced STEM classes. Environmental Science AP and Psychology AP were added as class options for the academic year of 2013–2014.

== Athletics ==
MVHS Athletics is part of Central Coast Section (CCS), which governs High School Athletics from San Francisco to King City, and the California Interscholastic Federation (CIF). The school sponsors the following interscholastic teams for young men and women: basketball, cross country, golf, soccer, swimming & diving, tennis, track & field, football, baseball, volleyball, badminton, lacrosse, wrestling, and water polo.

== Notable alumni ==
- Ailsa Chang, journalist
- Erik Davis, Major League Baseball pitcher, formerly with the Washington Nationals
- Adam Krikorian, head coach of the UCLA water polo team and the US women's Olympic water polo team
- Blake Krikorian, Former technology entrepreneur
- Allie Montoya, soccer player
- Brendan Nyhan, political scientist
- Kendal Smith, Former NFL player
- Jose Antonio Vargas, Washington Post reporter and 2008 Pulitzer Prize winner
- Maya Higa, conservationist, Twitch streamer
