= Mountain View, California =

City in California, United States

- City
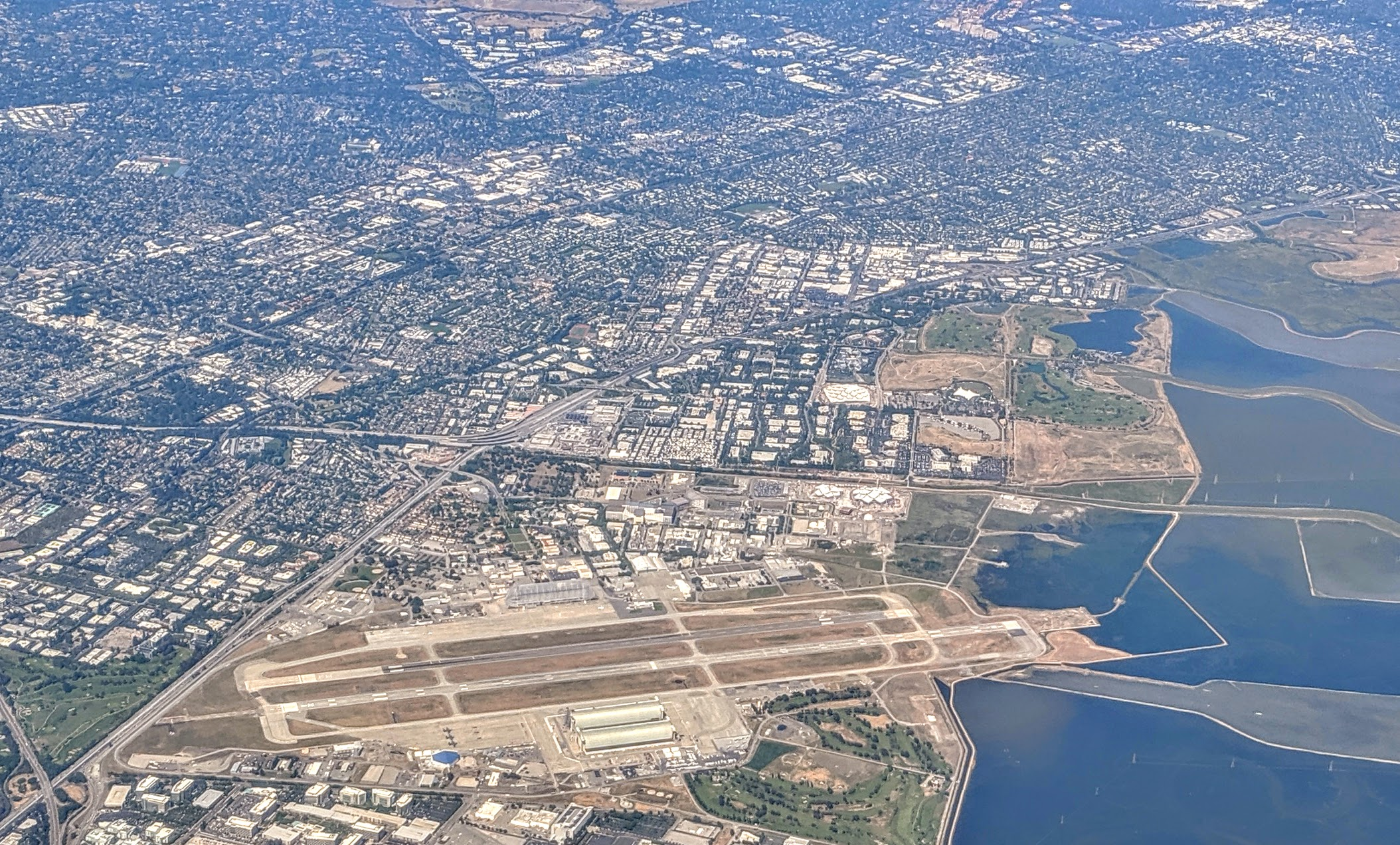
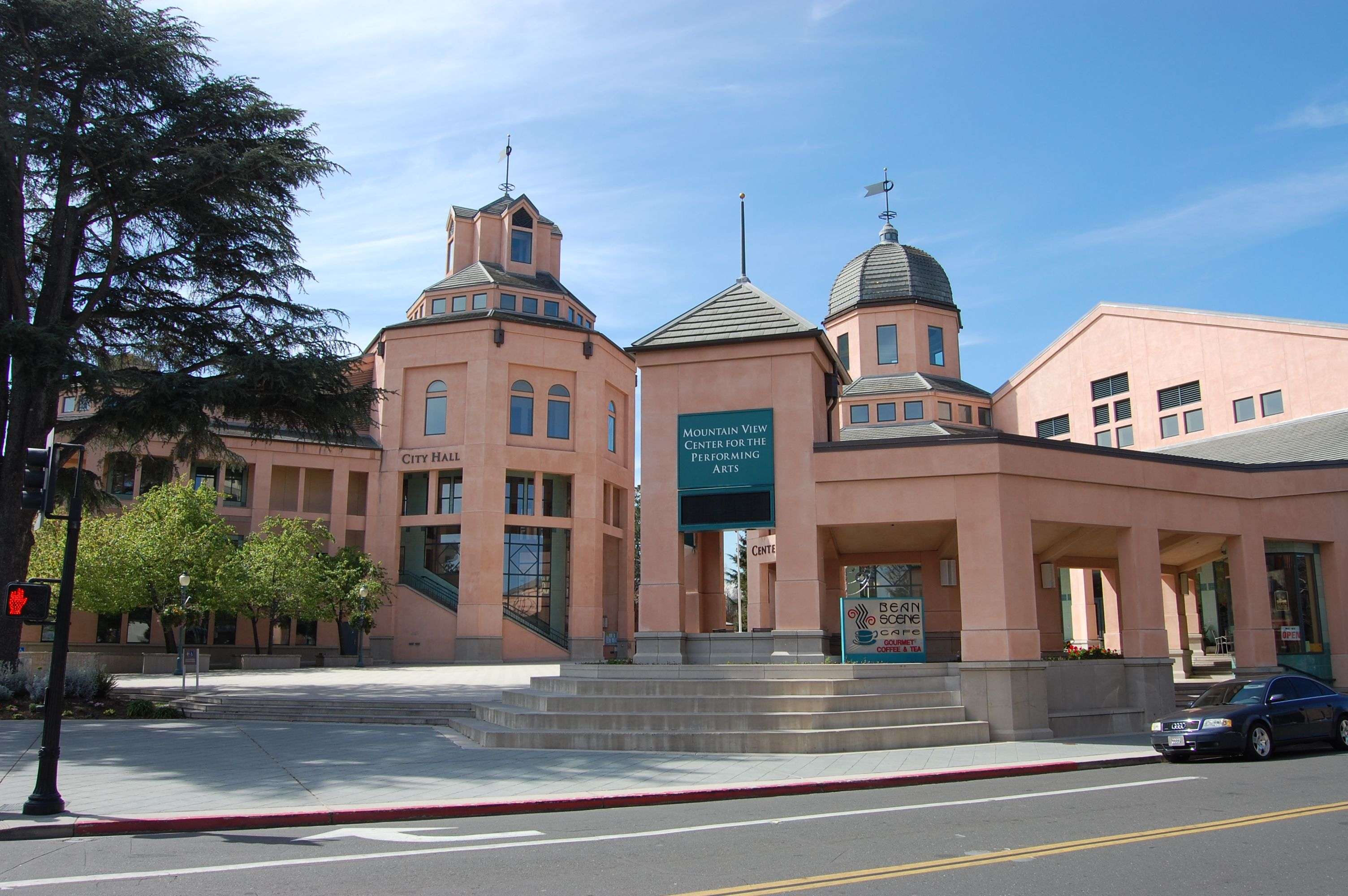
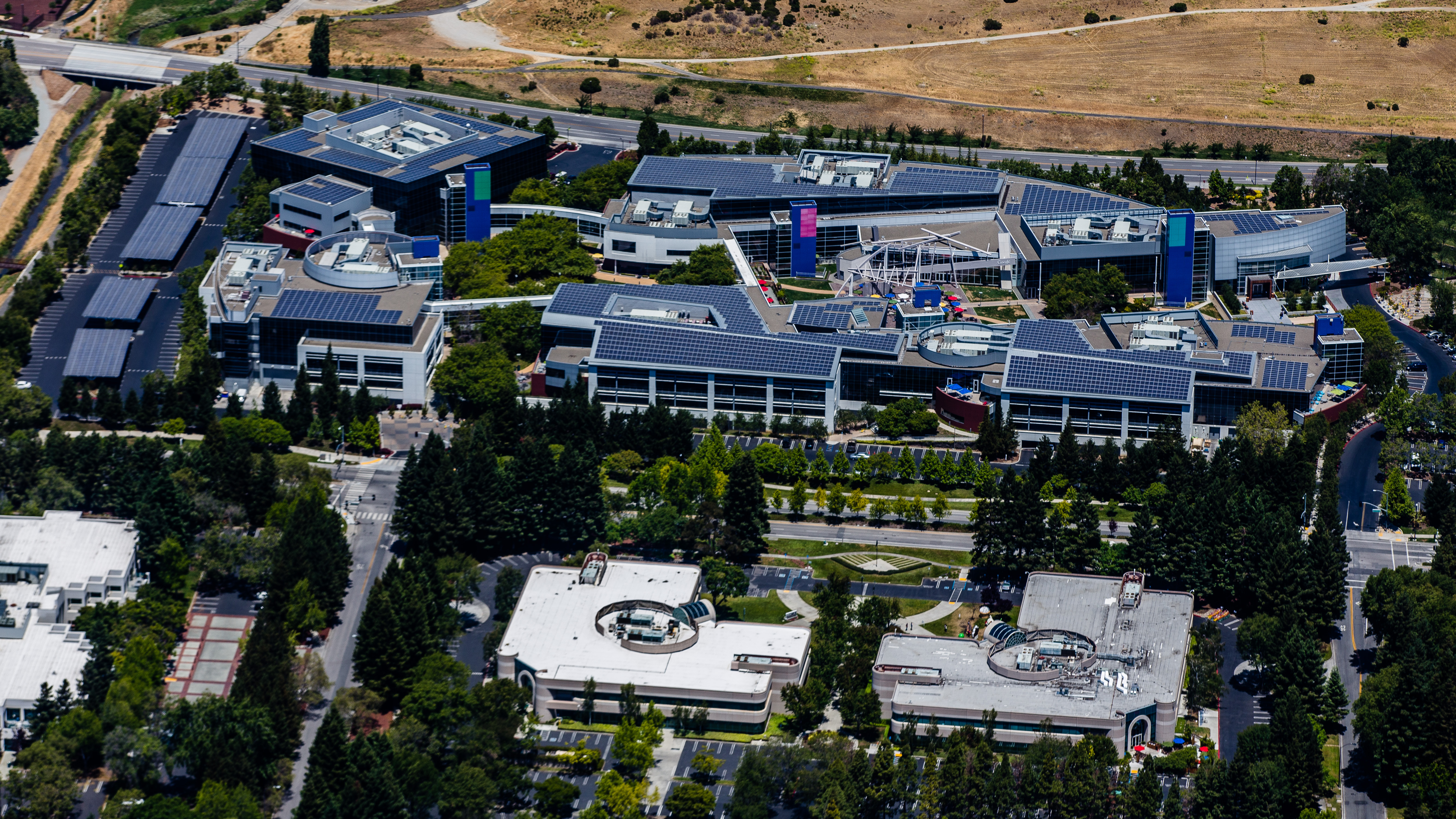
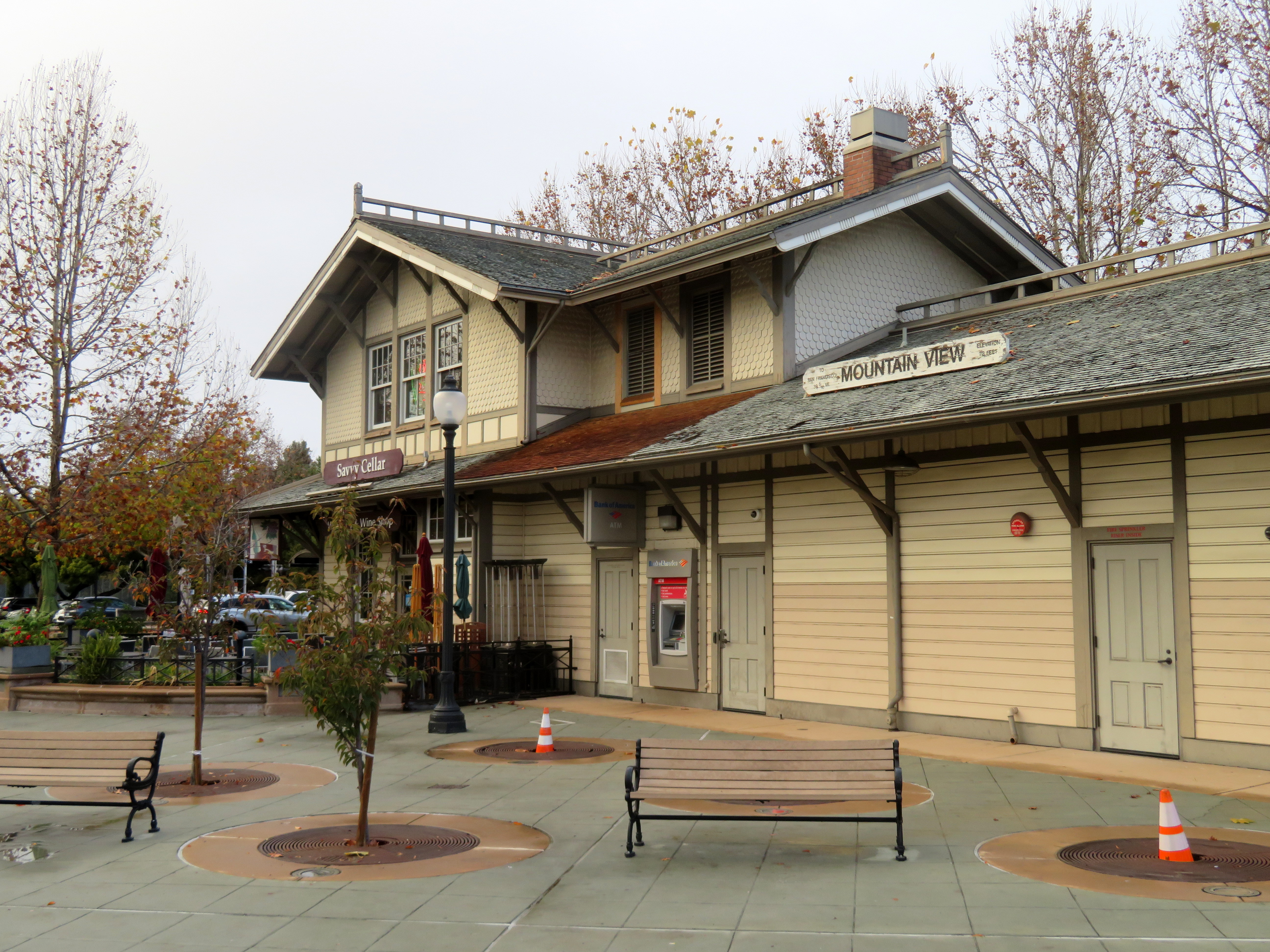
- Aerial view of Moffett Federal Airfield and Mountain View City Hall and Performing Arts Center Downtown Mountain View Googleplex Downtown Mountain View Station

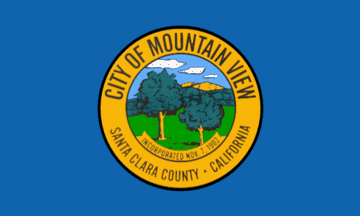
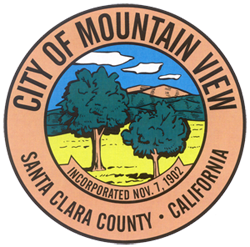
- Flag Seal
- Interactive map of Mountain View, California
- Location in the San Francisco Bay Area Location in California Location in the United States
- Coordinates: 37°23′10″N 122°05′02″W
- Country: United States
- State: California
- County: Santa Clara
- Incorporated: November 7, 1902

Government
  - Type: Council–manager
  - Mayor: Emily Ann Ramos
  - Vice mayor: Chris Clark
  - City manager: Kimbra McCarthy
  - Supervisor: Margaret Abe-Koga
  - State Assembly Member: Marc Berman

Area
  - Total: 12.236 sq mi (31.691 km^{2})
  - Land: 11.958 sq mi (30.971 km^{2})
  - Water: 0.278 sq mi (0.719 km^{2}) 2.27%
- Elevation: 105 ft (32 m)

Population (2020)
  - Total: 82,376
  - Estimate (2025): 85,438
  - Rank: US: 410th CA: 93rd
  - Density: 7,300/sq mi (2,819/km^{2})
- Time zone: UTC–8 (Pacific (PST))
  - Summer (DST): UTC–7 (PDT)
- ZIP Codes: 94035, 94039–94043
- Area code: 650
- FIPS code: 06-49670
- GNIS feature IDs: 0277611, 2411186
- Website: mountainview.gov

Mountain View is a city in Santa Clara County, California, United States, part of the San Francisco Bay Area. Named for its views of the Santa Cruz Mountains, the population was 82,376 at the 2020 census.

Mountain View was integral to the early history and growth of Silicon Valley, and is the location of many high technology companies. In 1956, William Shockley established Shockley Semiconductor Laboratory in Mountain View, the first company to develop silicon semiconductor devices in Silicon Valley. Mountain View houses the headquarters of many of the world's largest technology companies, including Google and Alphabet Inc., Intuit, NASA Ames Research Center, and former or existing headquarters for Symantec, 23andMe, LinkedIn, Samsung, Quora and Synopsys.

== History ==
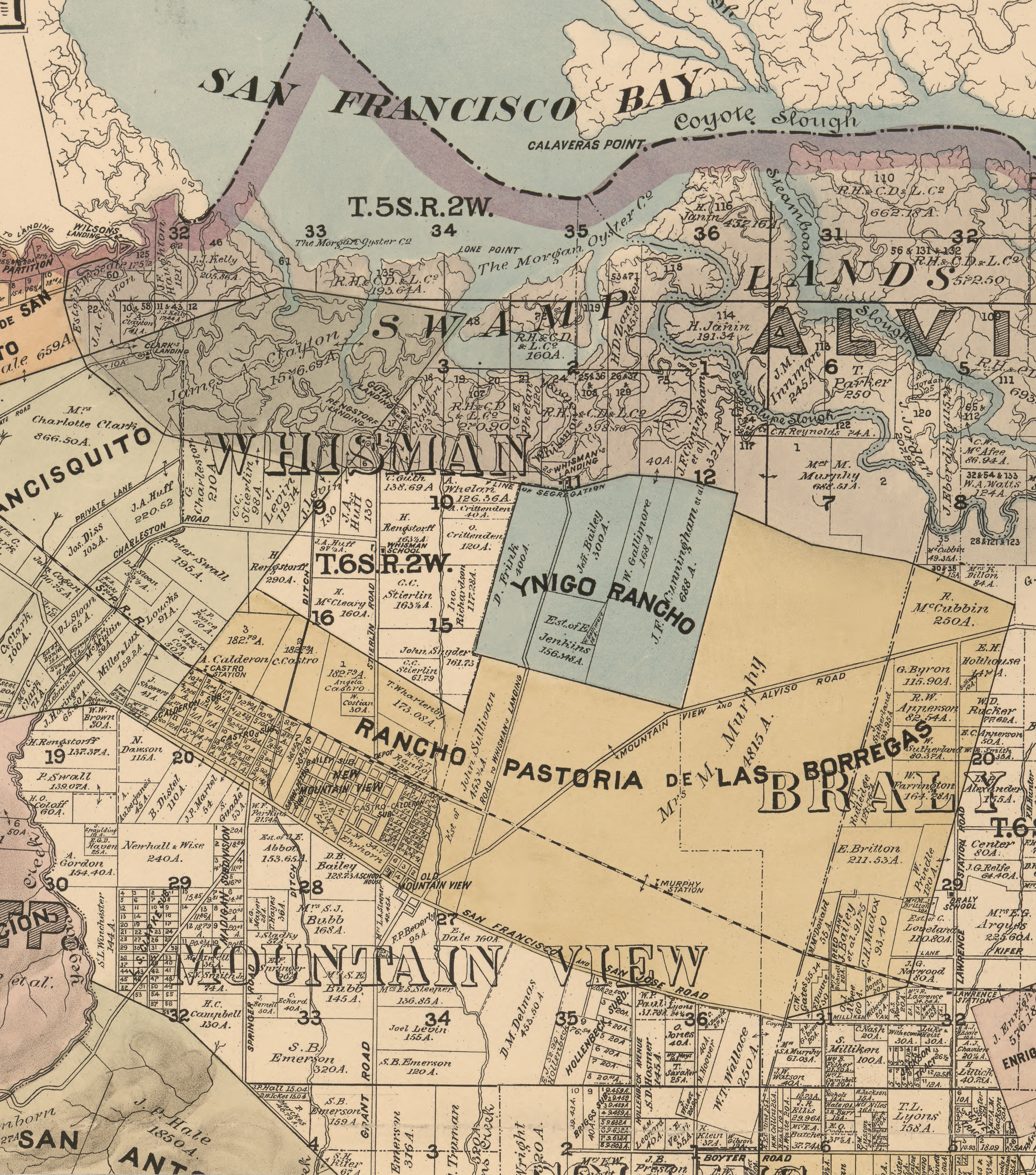
Map of Mountain View surrounds, 1890. Note Rancho Posolmi (here called Ynigo Rancho) and Rancho Pastoria de las Borregas. Mountain View Whisman School District is named for Whisman.

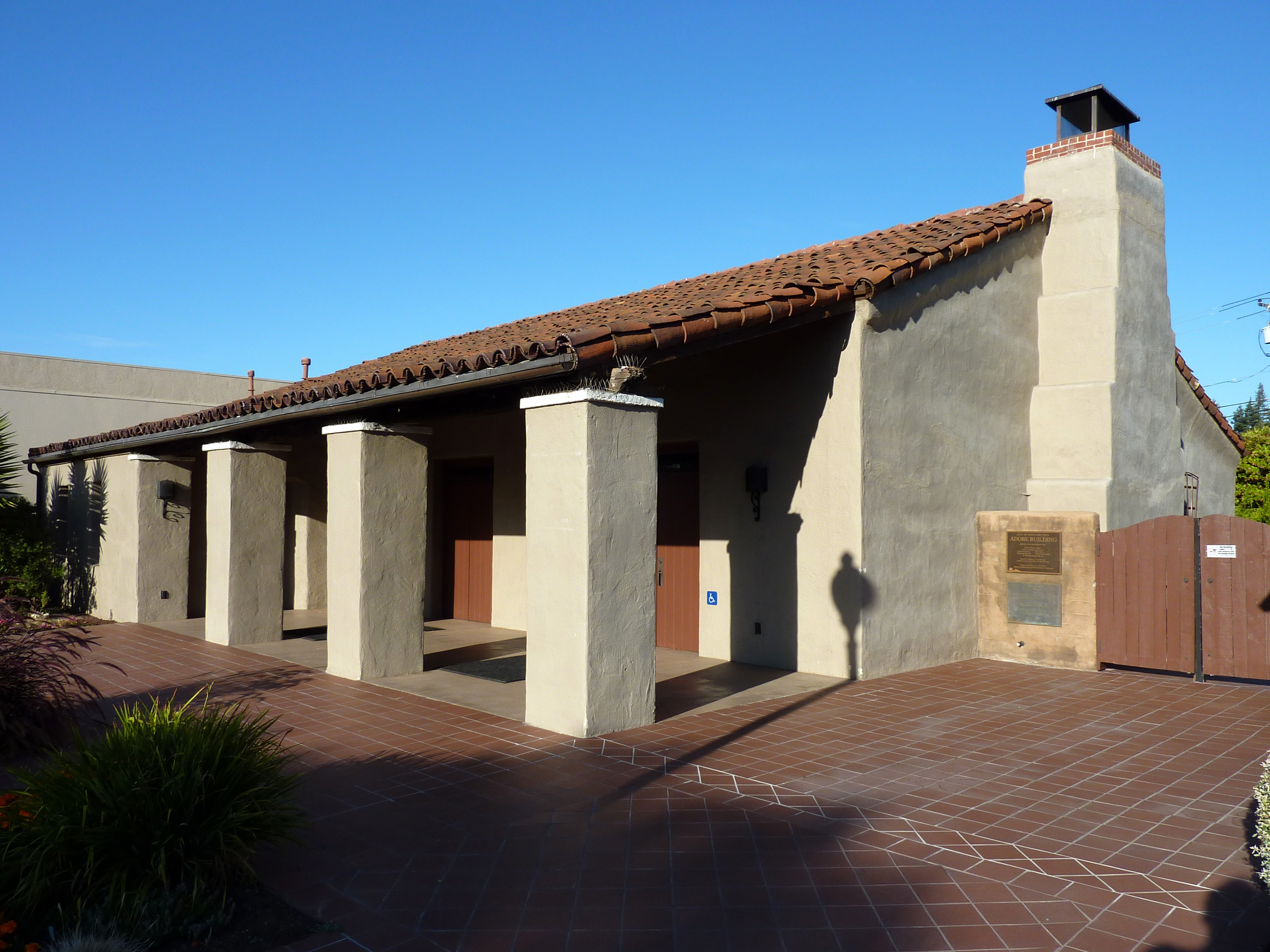
Mountain View Adobe was constructed as a Works Progress Administration project in 1934.

The fertile land between the Santa Cruz Mountains and the shores of the southern San Francisco Bay once supported multiple villages of the indigenous Ohlone people. Spanish missionaries utilized the land for sheep pastures.

The Mexican land grant of Rancho Pastoria de las Borregas was given in 1842 by Alta California governor Juan Alvarado to Francisco Estrada. This grant was later passed on to Mariano Castro, who sold half of the land to Martin Murphy Jr. Eventually, the former land grant was developed as the cities of Mountain View and Sunnyvale.

The southwest shore of San Francisco Bay was settled by European-Americans in 1852 as a stagecoach station. This was after the United States acquired California. By the early 1900s, it was a shipping point for fruit and grain, as well as a center of religious book publishing.

The early pioneers were commonly buried at the old cemetery between Mercy & Church, off Castro Street. This is now the site of the present city library and park, known as Pioneer Park.

=== Residents ===
In 1852, Seligman Weilheimer and his brother Samuel immigrated from Dossenheim, Baden, Germany. They built the first big general merchandise store in the settlement in 1856.

=== Advent of local aerospace and electronics industries ===
The U.S. Navy's adjacent 1,000-acre (4.0 km^{2}) Moffett Field Complex was constructed beginning after 1931; its development attracted many workers and it brought many economic opportunities. After World War II, the population grew significantly with the development of regional aerospace and electronics industries. Between 1950 and 1960, the population grew from 6,563 to 30,889, an increase of 370.7%.

Between 1929 and 1994, Moffett Field Naval Air Station operated in Mountain View. In 1940, the city was the base of the National Advisory Committee for Aeronautics (now the NASA Ames Research Center), which had a strong influence on the development of aerospace and electronics industries.

=== Economic climate ===
Technology is the foundation of the local economy. Few remnants are visible of the city's agricultural past.

In 1990, Kevin Duggan began his position as city manager. He built a relationship with Google, Inc., and issued a long-term lease to it and other technology companies. As of 2014, those leases generate over $5 million per year in city revenue. The Castro Street downtown area also benefited from a special tax district.

In 2016, the city's voters approved a rent control ordinance.

== Geography ==
According to the United States Census Bureau, the city has a total area of 12.236 square miles (31.69 km^{2}), of which 11.958 square miles (30.97 km^{2}) is land and 0.278 square miles (0.72 km^{2}) (2.26%) is water.

=== Neighborhoods ===
The Blossom Valley neighborhood comprises five smaller neighborhoods: Springer Meadows, Varsity Park, Blossom Valley Estates, Springer Trees, and Gest Ranch subdivision known as Miramonte Oaks which borders Los Altos. This would be one of the more exclusive areas, this development was built in 1963 to about 1965. The other neighborhood's ranch-style housing were built in the 1950s and 1960s on orchard land.

The Cuernavaca neighborhood is located off Crestview Drive near the Sunnyvale border. This neighborhood used to be the location of a cherry orchard, and later a nine-hole golf course and swim club before it was turned into housing, which was completed in 1989. Most of the housing in Cuernavaca is Spanish-style, with red tiled roofs.

The Monta Loma neighborhood is located between the bounds of San Antonio Road, Middlefield Road, Rengstorff Avenue and Central Expressway. Monta Loma houses a collection of California-style mid-century modern houses by Joseph Eichler, John Calder Mackay, and Mardell Building Company.

=== Hazardous waste ===
Due to its history as a center for semiconductor manufacturing, Mountain View has seven sites on the Environmental Protection Agency's Final National Priorities List (NPL), a list of hazardous waste sites in the United States eligible for long-term remedial action financed under the federal Superfund program. The sites were formerly used by companies including Fairchild Semiconductor, Intel, Raytheon, CTS Printex Inc., Spectra-Physics, Jasco Chemical, GTE and Teledyne. These seven sites make up a portion of the 22 NPL sites in Santa Clara County, which are included in the total of 94 sites in California.

=== Climate ===
Mountain View has a warm-summer Mediterranean climate (Köppen climate classification Csb: dry-summer subtropical). Summers are warm and dry, while winters are cool and wet. However, both summers and winters are somewhat moderated due to the city's relative proximity to the Pacific, although it has a lesser maritime influence than San Francisco further north on the peninsula.

Climate data for Moffett Federal Airfield, Mountain View, California
Month	Jan	Feb	Mar	Apr	May	Jun	Jul	Aug	Sep	Oct	Nov	Dec	Year
Record high °F (°C)	77 (25)	84 (29)	85 (29)	98 (37)	100 (38)	107 (42)	105 (41)	101 (38)	105 (41)	100 (38)	89 (32)	75 (24)	107 (42)
Mean daily maximum °F (°C)	59.0 (15.0)	61.8 (16.6)	65.0 (18.3)	68.0 (20.0)	71.7 (22.1)	75.9 (24.4)	76.9 (24.9)	76.9 (24.9)	77.7 (25.4)	74.1 (23.4)	65.5 (18.6)	58.9 (14.9)	69.3 (20.7)
Daily mean °F (°C)	50.7 (10.4)	53.1 (11.7)	55.8 (13.2)	58.4 (14.7)	62.1 (16.7)	65.8 (18.8)	67.7 (19.8)	68.0 (20.0)	67.5 (19.7)	63.6 (17.6)	55.9 (13.3)	50.5 (10.3)	59.9 (15.5)
Mean daily minimum °F (°C)	42.2 (5.7)	44.5 (6.9)	46.7 (8.2)	48.9 (9.4)	52.5 (11.4)	55.7 (13.2)	58.5 (14.7)	59.0 (15.0)	57.3 (14.1)	53.1 (11.7)	46.3 (7.9)	42.1 (5.6)	50.6 (10.3)
Record low °F (°C)	21 (−6)	20 (−7)	22 (−6)	31 (−1)	33 (1)	40 (4)	43 (6)	44 (7)	37 (3)	34 (1)	26 (−3)	20 (−7)	20 (−7)
Average precipitation inches (mm)	3.06 (78)	3.31 (84)	2.49 (63)	0.98 (25)	0.48 (12)	0.09 (2.3)	0 (0)	0.03 (0.76)	0.15 (3.8)	0.76 (19)	1.96 (50)	2.95 (75)	16.26 (412.86)
Average precipitation days	10	10.5	9.6	5.2	2.6	0.7	0.2	0.2	1.5	4.1	8.3	11.1	63.9
Source 1:
Source 2:

== Economy ==
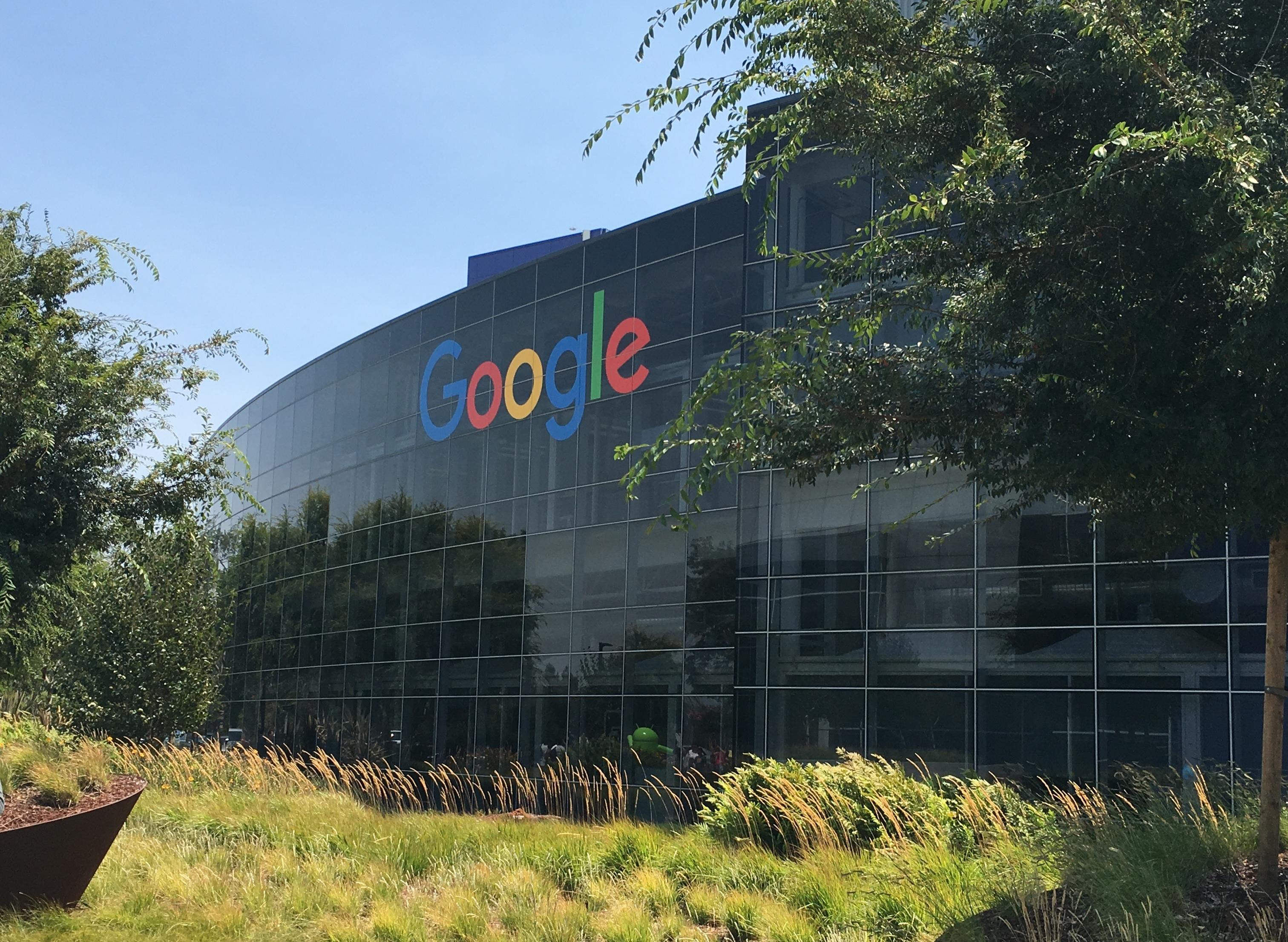
Google headquarters, Googleplex, is Mountain View's largest employer

Mountain View is one of the major cities that make up Silicon Valley, and has many notable Silicon Valley companies either headquartered there or with a large presence. As of 2026, major tech companies such as Google and Intuit were headquartered in Mountain View.

After voting to increase the minimum wage incrementally in 2015, in December 2017, the Mountain View City Council implemented a mandatory $15 minimum wage, to apply to employees who work two or more hours a week. At the start of 2018, Mountain View raised its minimum wage to $15. Starting on January 1, 2019, the minimum wage was to be "adjusted annually based on the San Francisco-Oakland-San Jose regional Consumer Price Index". A proposal to slow down the rate of the wage increases by a year was defeated in a City Council meeting on December 4, 2018. Subsequently, on December 30, 2018, it was announced that Mountain View's minimum wage would rise to $15.65 on January 1, 2019, with the increase delayed by one year for companies with 25 or fewer employees. As of January 2026, the minimum wage in Mountain View is $19.70 per hour.

=== Top employers ===
According to the city's 2025 annual comprehensive financial report, the largest employers in the city are:

#	Employer	# of Employees	Percentage
1	Google LLC	23,100	19.1%
2	El Camino Hospital	3,400	2.8%
3	Intuit	3,400	2.8%
4	Microsoft	3,000	2.5%
5	LinkedIn	2,500	2.1%
6	Waymo	1,700	1.4%
7	Palo Alto/Sutter Health	1,000	0.8%
8	Mountain View Whisman School District	600	0.5%
9	Bytedance	560	0.5%
10	Nuro	500	0.4%
—	Total employers	39,760	32.9%

== Demographics ==
Historical population
Census	Pop.	Note	%±
1880	250		—
1930	3,308		—
1940	3,946		19.3%
1950	6,563		66.3%
1960	30,889		370.7%
1970	54,132		75.2%
1980	58,655		8.4%
1990	67,460		15.0%
2000	70,708		4.8%
2010	74,066		4.7%
2020	82,376		11.2%
2024 (est.)	87,316	▲	6.0%
U.S. Decennial Census; 2020 Census

=== Racial and ethnic composition ===
Mountain View, California – Racial and ethnic composition Note: the US Census treats Hispanic/Latino as an ethnic category. This table excludes Latinos from the racial categories and assigns them to a separate category. Hispanics/Latinos may be of any race.
Race / Ethnicity (NH = Non-Hispanic)	Pop 2000	Pop 2010	Pop 2020	% 2000	% 2010	% 2020
White alone (NH)	39,029	34,052	33,008	55.20%	45.98%	40.07%
Black or African American alone (NH)	1,674	1,468	1,155	2.37%	1.98%	1.40%
Native American or Alaska Native alone (NH)	164	116	101	0.23%	0.16%	0.12%
Asian alone (NH)	14,513	19,064	28,760	20.53%	25.74%	34.91%
Native Hawaiian or Pacific Islander alone (NH)	160	372	215	0.23%	0.50%	0.26%
Other race alone (NH)	221	241	557	0.31%	0.33%	0.68%
Mixed race or Multiracial (NH)	2,036	2,682	4,374	2.88%	3.62%	5.31%
Hispanic or Latino (any race)	12,911	16,071	14,206	18.26%	21.70%	17.25%
Total	70,708	74,066	82,376	100.00%	100.00%	100.00%

=== 2020 census ===
As of the 2020 census, there were 82,376 people, 34,423 households, and 19,585 families residing in the city. The median age was 35.3 years. 19.3% of residents were under the age of 18 and 11.8% of residents were 65 years of age or older. For every 100 females, there were 107.7 males, and for every 100 females age 18 and over, there were 108.5 males age 18 and over. The population density was 6,888.8 inhabitants per square mile (2,659.8/km^{2}).

100.0% of residents lived in urban areas, while 0.0% lived in rural areas.

Of all households, 28.2% had children under the age of 18 living in them. 45.7% were married-couple households, 24.7% were households with a male householder and no spouse or partner present, and 22.6% were households with a female householder and no spouse or partner present. About 30.1% of all households were made up of individuals, and 8.2% had someone living alone who was 65 years of age or older. There were 37,295 housing units, of which 7.7% were vacant. The homeowner vacancy rate was 1.1%, and the rental vacancy rate was 6.4%.

=== Labor force and poverty ===
According to the US Bureau of Labor Statistics, Mountain View had an unemployment rate of 5.0% in August 2013. In 2022, 5.4 percent of people in Mountain View were living below the poverty line. Of residents age 16 and older, 72.9 percent were in the civilian labor force and 27.1 percent were not.

=== 2010 census ===
As of the 2010 census, there were 74,066 people, households, and families residing in the city. The population density was 6,174.6 inhabitants per square mile (2,384.0/km^{2}). There were 31,957 housing units.

145 (0.2%) lived in non-institutionalized group quarters, and 120 (0.2%) were institutionalized. There were 31,957 households, out of which 8,731 (27.3%) had children under the age of 18 living in them, 13,806 (43.2%) were opposite-sex married couples living together, 2,456 (7.7%) had a female householder with no husband present, 1,253 (3.9%) had a male householder with no wife present. There were 1,928 (6.0%) unmarried opposite-sex partnerships, and 280 (0.9%) same-sex married couples or partnerships. 10,961 households (34.3%) were made up of individuals, and 2,471 (7.7%) had someone living alone who was 65 years of age or older. The average household size was 2.31. There were 17,515 families (54.8% of all households); the average family size was 3.01. The population was spread out, with 14,594 people (19.7%) under the age of 18, 5,401 people (7.3%) aged 18 to 24, 28,577 people (38.6%) aged 25 to 44, 17,647 people (23.8%) aged 45 to 64, and 7,846 people (10.6%) who were 65 years of age or older. The median age was 35.9 years. For every 100 females, there were 103.6 males. For every 100 females age 18 and over, there were 103.5 males. There were 33,881 housing units at an average density of 2,760.6 units per square mile (1,065.9 units/km^{2}), of which 13,332 (41.7%) were owner-occupied, and 18,625 (58.3%) were occupied by renters. The homeowner vacancy rate was 1.3%; the rental vacancy rate was 4.4%. 32,002 people (43.2% of the population) lived in owner-occupied housing units, and 41,799 people (56.4%) lived in rental housing units.

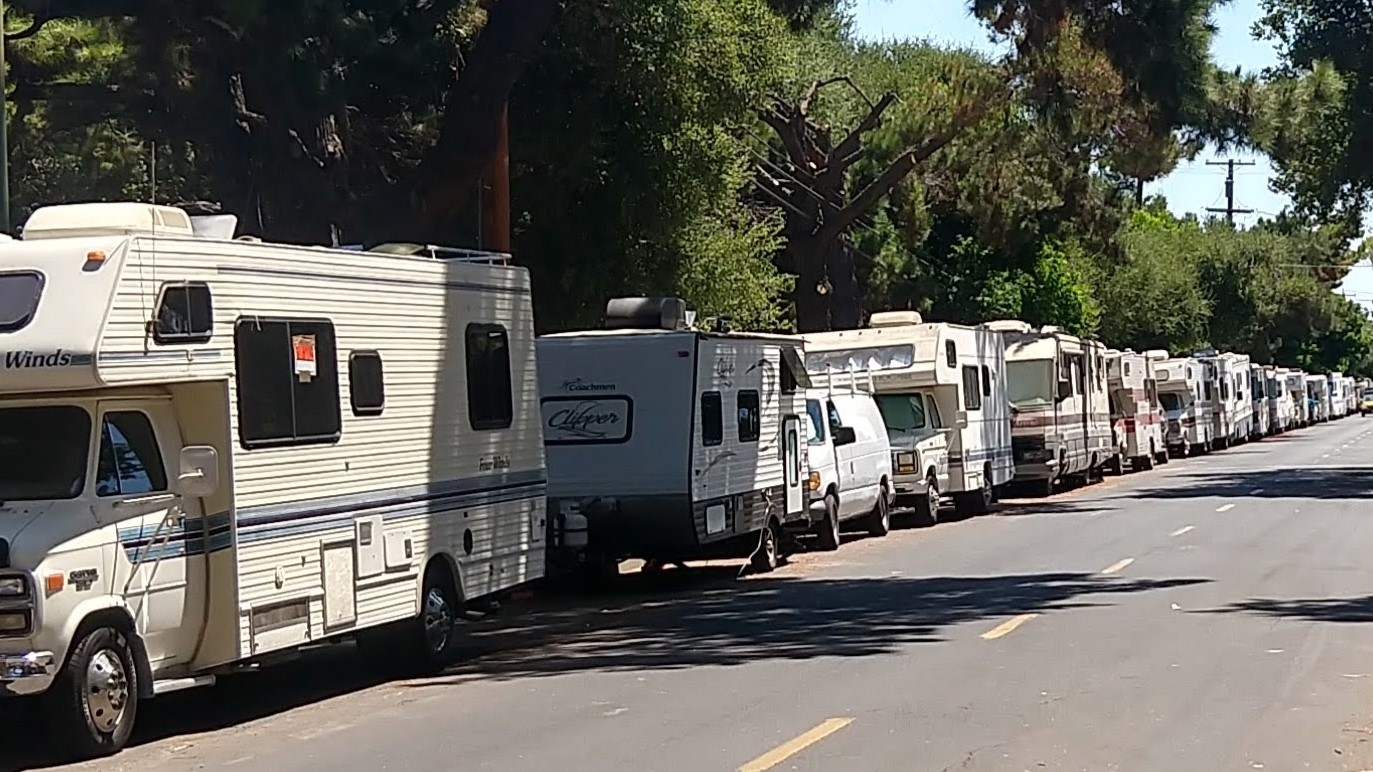
RV campers used as residences on a Mountain View street

According to the Santa Clara County Homeless Census and Survey, the number of homeless individuals in Mountain View increased 51% from 2015 to 2017, with 276 homeless individuals in 2015, and 416 in 2017. In August 2017, the Mercury News reported that Mountain View had seen RVs and recreational vehicles become the choice of residence for many working poor in the city. The city's communications coordinator called it a "new" situation, noting that many of the residents living in RVs were working up to three jobs, and that affordable housing was hard to come by in the city. In December 2017, Google received approval to build nearly 10,000 new units of housing near its future campus in the city.

=== 2000 census ===
As of the 2000 census, there were 70,708 people, 31,242 households, and 15,902 families residing in the city. The population density was 2,263.7/km^{2} (5,863/mi^{2}). There were 32,432 housing units at an average density of 1,038.3/km^{2} (2,689/mi^{2}). The racial makeup of the city was 63.77% White, 20.67% Asian, 18.26% Hispanic or Latino (of any race), 2.53% African American, 0.39% Native American, 0.26% Pacific Islander, 8.32% from other races, and 4.07% from two or more races.

There were 31,242 households, out of which 23.3% had children under the age of 18 living with them, 40.0% were married couples living together, 7.3% had a female householder with no husband present, and 49.1% were non-families. 35.6% of all households were made up of individuals, and 7.0% had someone living alone who was 65 years of age or older. The average household size was 2.25 and the average family size was 2.97.

In the city, the population was spread out, with 18.0% under the age of 18, 8.3% from 18 to 24, 43.4% from 25 to 44, 19.8% from 45 to 64, and 10.5% who were 65 years of age or older. The median age was 35 years. For every 100 females, there were 106.8 males. For every 100 females age 18 and over, there were 106.9 males.

The median income for a household in the city was $69,362, and the median income for a family was $80,379. Males had a median income of $64,585 versus $44,358 for females. The per capita income for the city was $39,693. About 3.6% of families and 6.8% of the population were below the poverty line, including 7.2% of those under age 18 and 5.9% of those age 65 or over.

== Arts and culture ==
=== Points of interest ===
==== Downtown ====
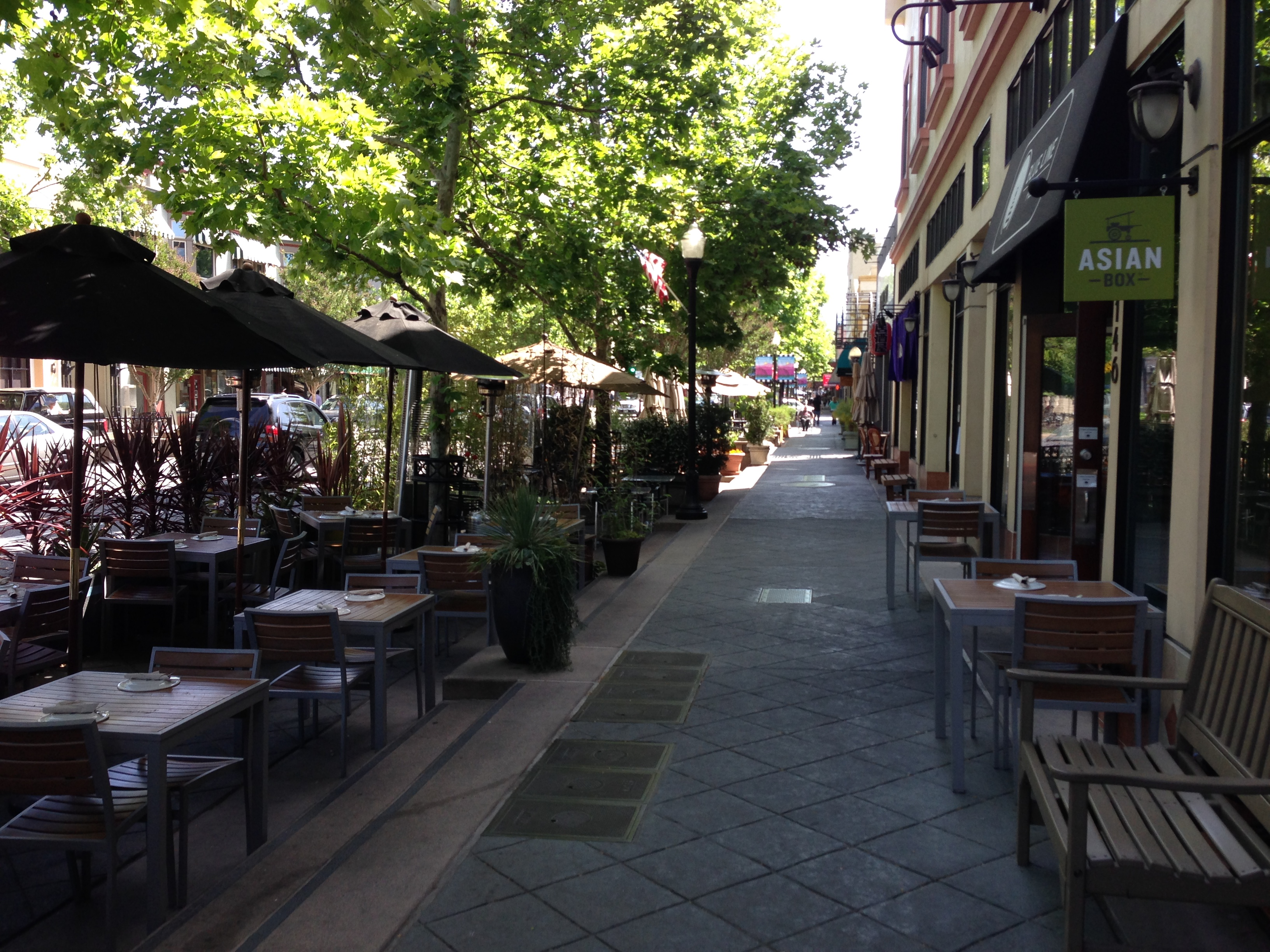
Sidewalk along Castro Street in downtown Mountain View

Mountain View has a pedestrian-friendly downtown centered on Castro Street. The downtown area consists of the seven blocks of Castro Street from the Mountain View station transit center in the north to the intersection with El Camino Real in the south. The transit center links the Caltrain commuter rail and Santa Clara Valley Transportation Authority (VTA) light rail and bus systems.

Four blocks with a concentration of restaurants, cafes, and shops extend south from the downtown station. The Michelin Guide-starred restaurant Chez TJ is located a block from Castro Street on Villa Street.

The core of downtown is the plaza shared by City Hall, the Mountain View Center for the Performing Arts (MVCPA) and the Mountain View Public Library. The plaza is used for many community gatherings and events, and features a collection of public art. Peninsula Youth Theatre and TheatreWorks are among the home companies of the MVCPA. The City Hall and MVCPA complex, designed by William Turnbull of San Francisco, opened in 1991. Behind those buildings is Pioneer Park, formerly the site of Mountain View's first cemetery.

The Mountain View Police Department is located two blocks away from Castro Street on Villa Street.

=== Seminary ===
St. Joseph Parish church was founded in 1905; it survived the 1906 San Francisco earthquake, only to burn down in 1928; it was rebuilt the following year.

St. Joseph's Seminary operated here between 1924 and 1991.

=== Library ===
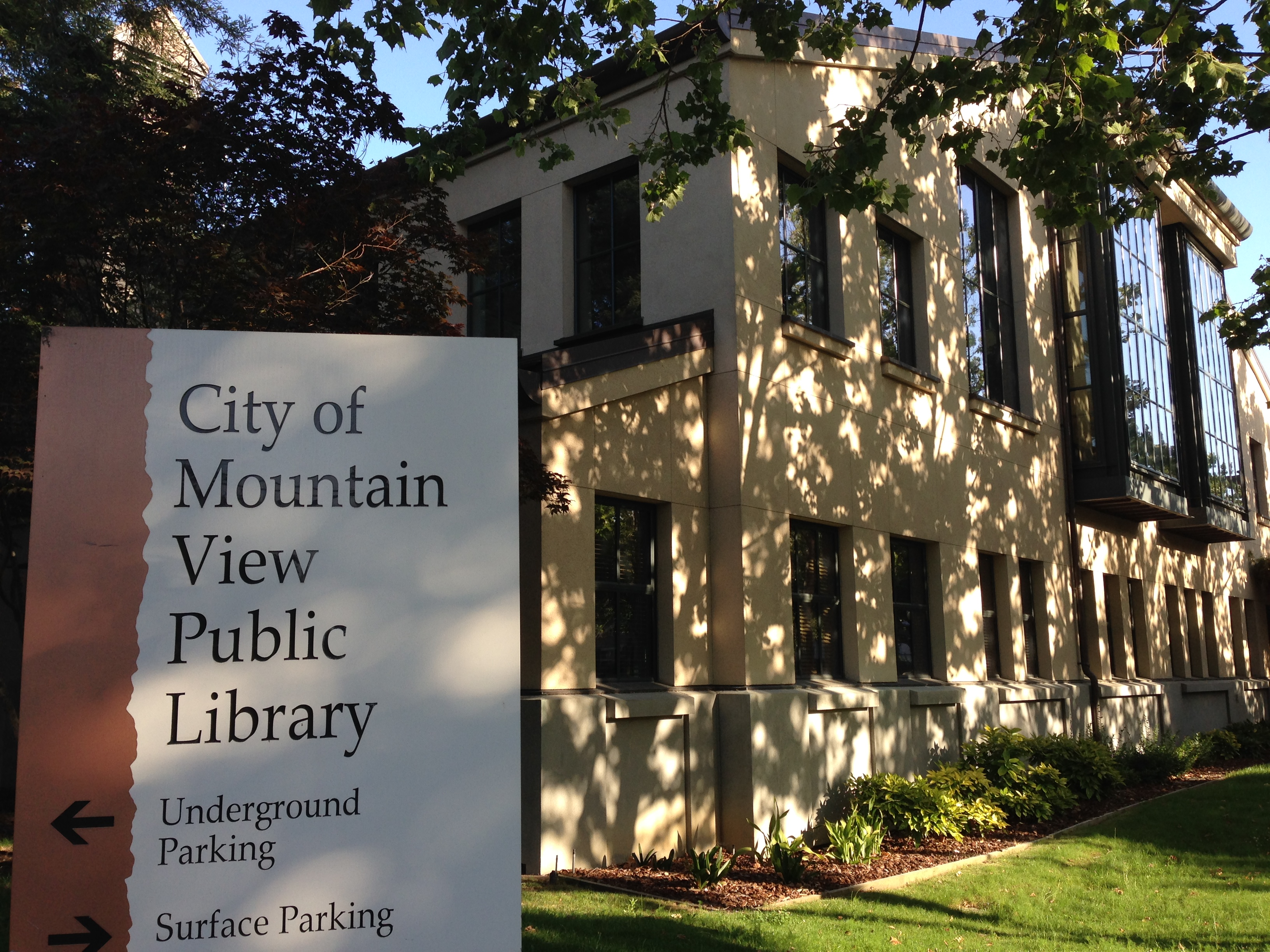
Library

Mountain View has one central public library, the Mountain View Public Library, which also provides outreach services through the bookmobile and S.O.S. volunteer program to those in Mountain View who are unable to come to the main branch. The building was built in 1997. The second floor of the library has a special collection in a room devoted to the history of Mountain View, which features a portrait of Crisanto Castro, for whom the major downtown thoroughfare is named. Displayed outside the library is a piece of the Berlin Wall, installed in 2013.

== Parks and recreation ==
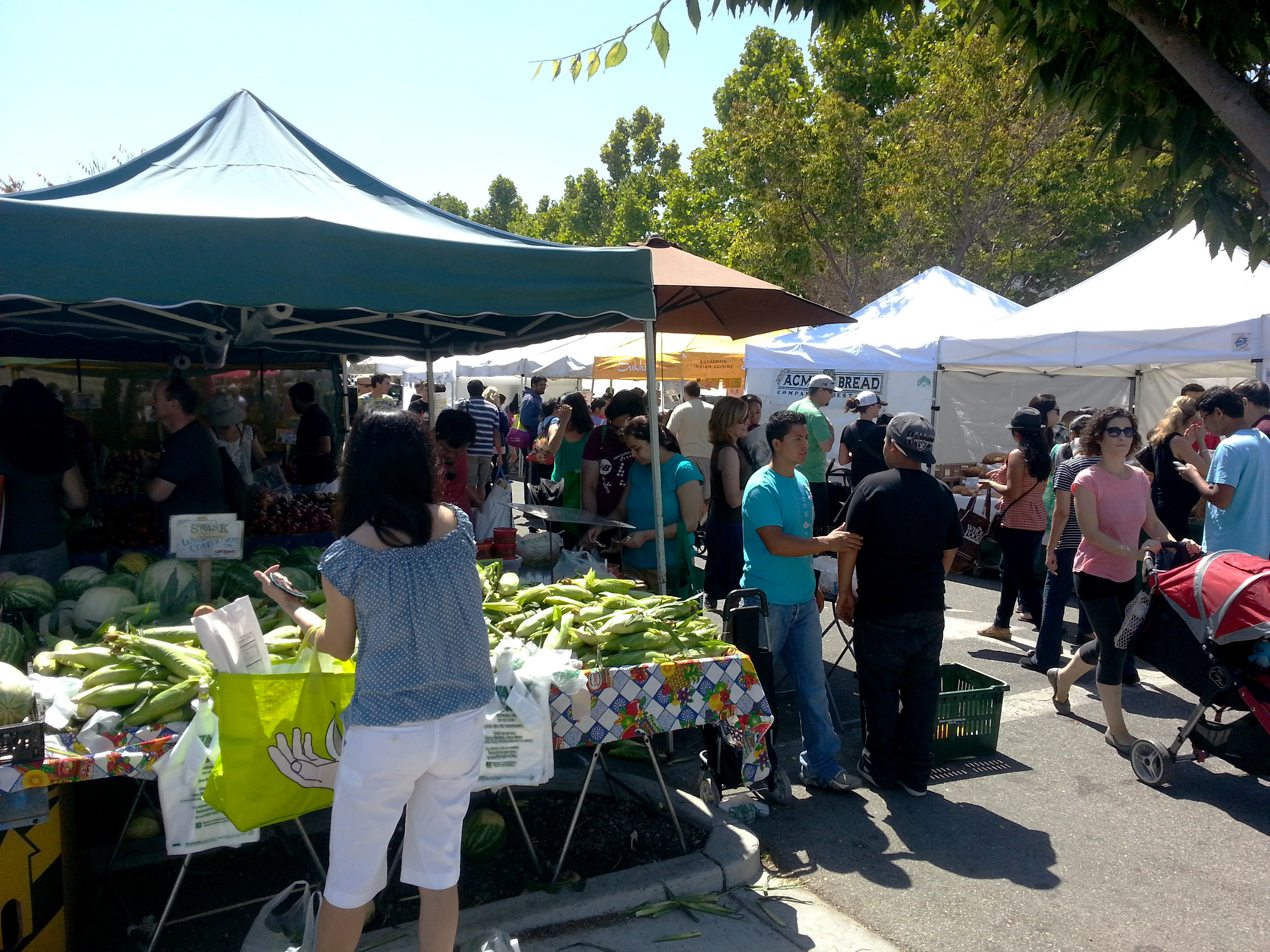
Mountain View Farmers' Market

The largest park in the city is Shoreline Park, which was built on a landfill and runs along the Bay north of U.S. Route 101. It includes Shoreline Amphitheatre, Shoreline Golf Course, as well as Rengstorff House, which is listed in the National Register of Historic Places. On the north side, facing the Bay, the park includes tidal ponds and mudflats, accessible via pedestrian and bicycle paths. The San Francisco Bay Trail runs along Shoreline Park.

Stevens Creek runs through Mountain View from the south and empties into the Bay in Shoreline Park. A paved pedestrian and bicycle path, the Stevens Creek Trail, runs alongside the creek for nearly its entire distance in Mountain View. Stevens Creek is home to coyotes, gray foxes, black-tailed deer, butterflies, dragonflies, and 150 species of birds, as well as shorebirds that feed in the mudflat. The shorebirds can be seen at low tide.

Other parks include:

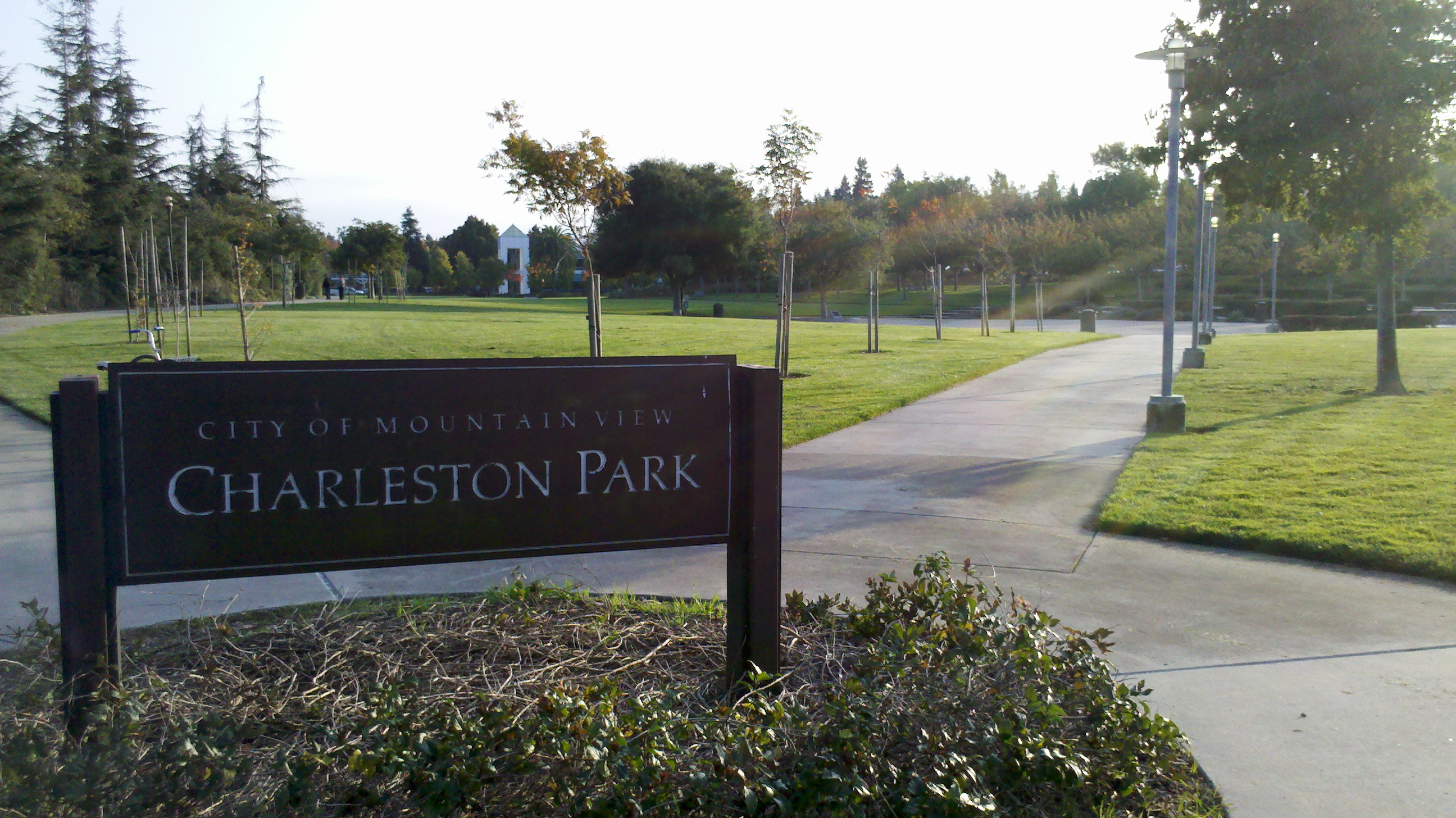
Charleston Park

- Eagle Park, which holds a public swimming pool, dog-friendly lawn, and World War II memorial
- Cuesta Park, a sprawling park with tennis courts, barbecue areas, and playgrounds, near El Camino Hospital and the YMCA
- Rengstorff Park, home to a public swimming pool, community center, skate park, fenced dog park, and multiple playgrounds and picnic areas
- Charleston Park, a five-acre park located near the Googleplex. The park was designed by SWA Group who received an ASLA Centennial Medallion in 1999 for their work.

== Government ==
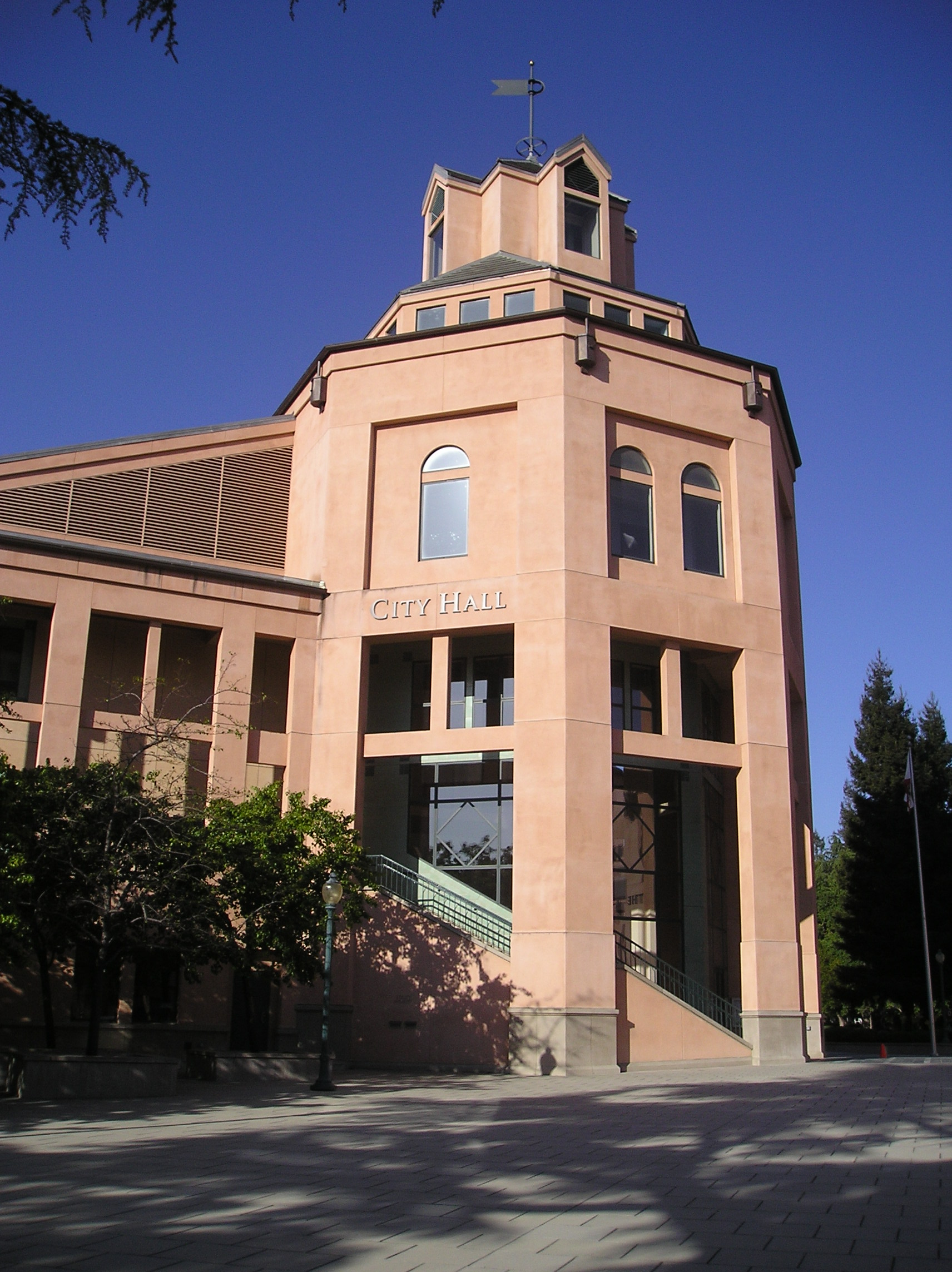
Mountain View City Hall

Mountain View has a council-manager government system. An executive city manager is in charge of several departments, while the city council, supported by several boards, commissions, and committees, is the legislature responsible for the ordinances of the city code. The executive in turn enforces the code and promulgates administrative regulations to execute it. The city clerk and attorney perform supporting roles. The Community Development Department is the agency responsible for planning and zoning.

=== State and federal representatives ===
In the state legislature, Mountain View is in the 13th senatorial district, represented by Democrat Josh Becker, and in the 23rd Assembly district, represented by Democrat Marc Berman. In the United States House of Representatives, Mountain View is in California's 16th congressional district, represented by Democrat Sam Liccardo.

=== City council ===
Mountain View is represented by a seven-member council elected at-large. The mayor is a council member appointed by their peers each year. The City Council maintains a number of Council Advisory Bodies, which provide input on a range of city matters pertaining to development, land use and historical preservation.

== Education ==
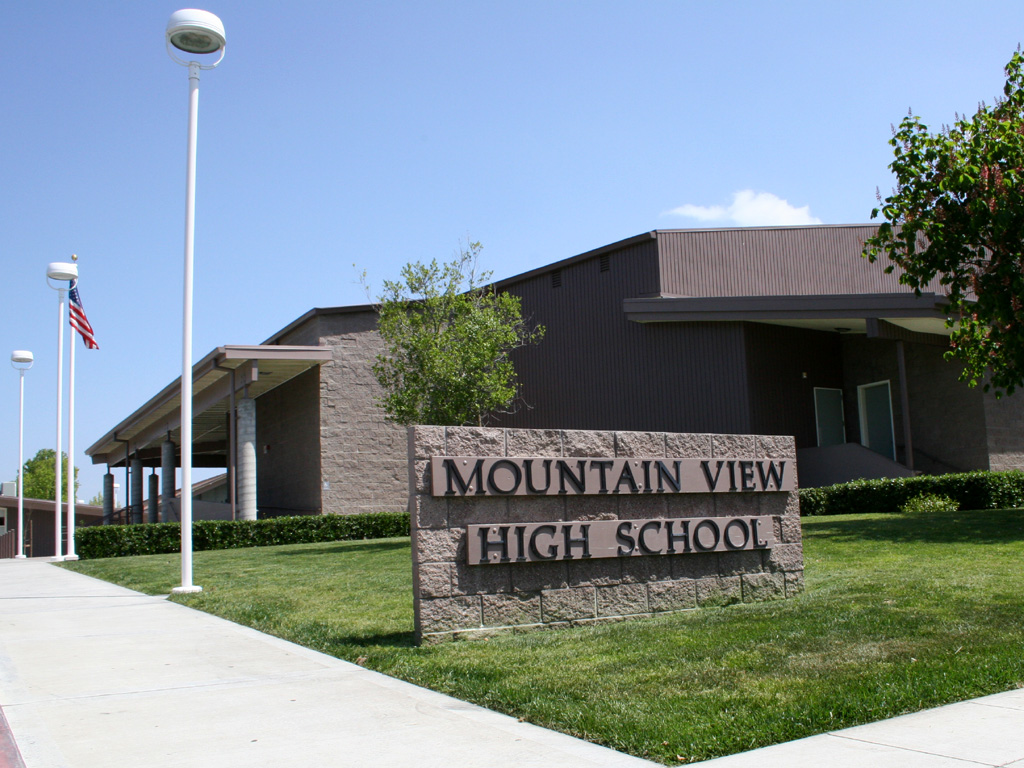
Mountain View High School

=== Public ===
The public elementary (Bubb, Castro, Imai(previously called Huff), Landels, Mistral, Monta Loma, Stevenson, Theuerkauf, and Vargas) and middle schools (Crittenden and Graham) are governed by the Mountain View-Whisman School District. Springer Elementary, although located within the borders of Mountain View, is governed by the Los Altos School District. The public high schools are governed by the Mountain View-Los Altos Union High School District and consist of Alta Vista High School, Mountain View High School, and Los Altos High School. Mountain View High and Los Altos High each contain approximately 50% Los Altos residents and 50% Mountain View residents. Some Mountain View residents attend Almond Elementary and Egan Junior High in the Los Altos School District.

=== Private ===
Notable private schools in Mountain View include: Khan Lab School, a laboratory school associated with Khan Academy; Saint Francis High School, a Roman Catholic secondary school; German International School of Silicon Valley (GISSV), a PK-12 German-English bilingual international school; and Yew Chung International School of Silicon Valley, a PK-8 Chinese-English bilingual international school.

== Media ==
The Mountain View Voice is a local newspaper, which began publishing in 1993.

== Infrastructure ==
=== Roads ===
Major thoroughfares that feed through the city include:

- SR-237
- SR-85
- US-101
- County Route G6
- El Camino Real (SR 82)

=== Public transportation ===
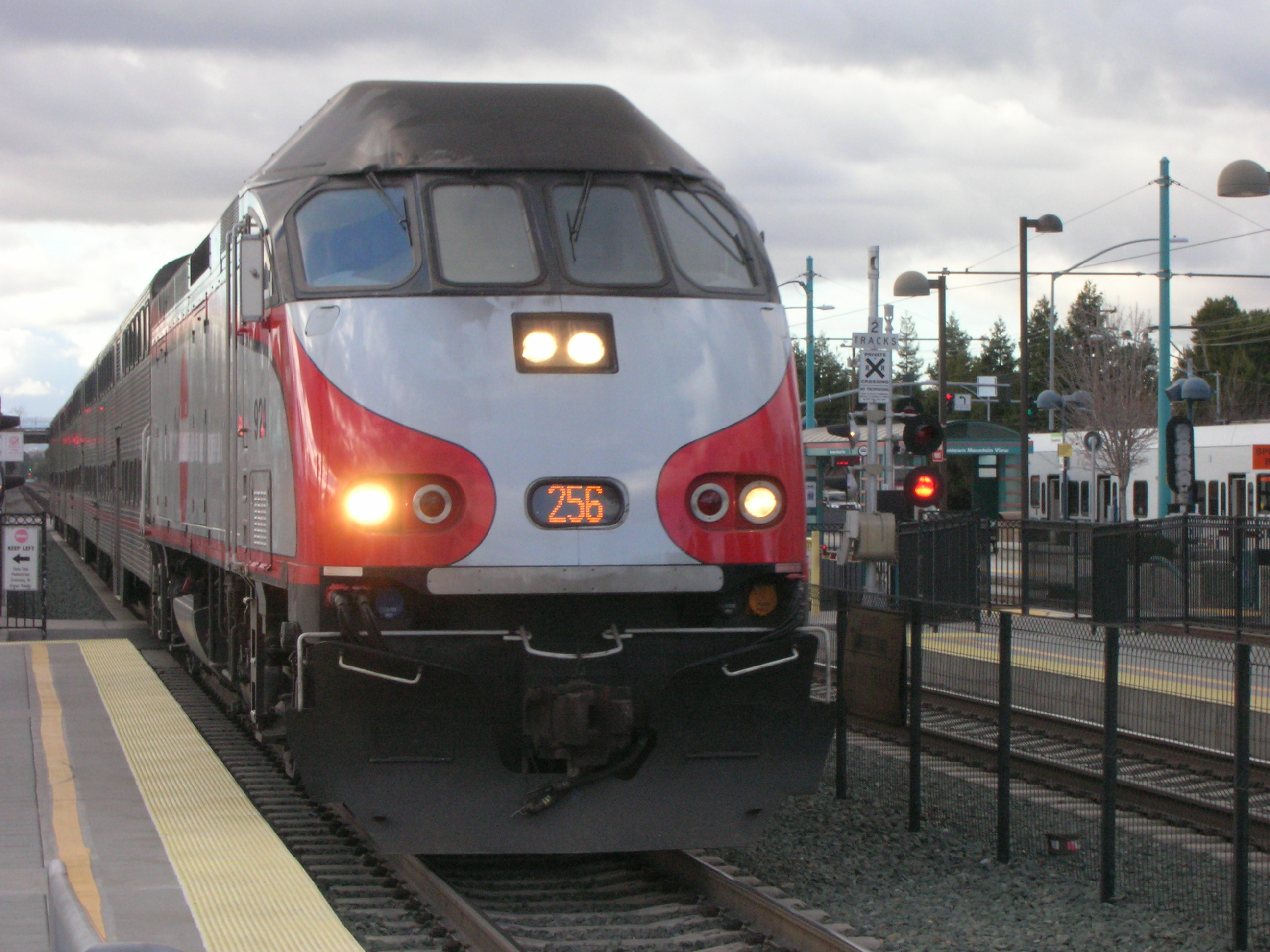
Caltrain commuter rail at Mountain View station

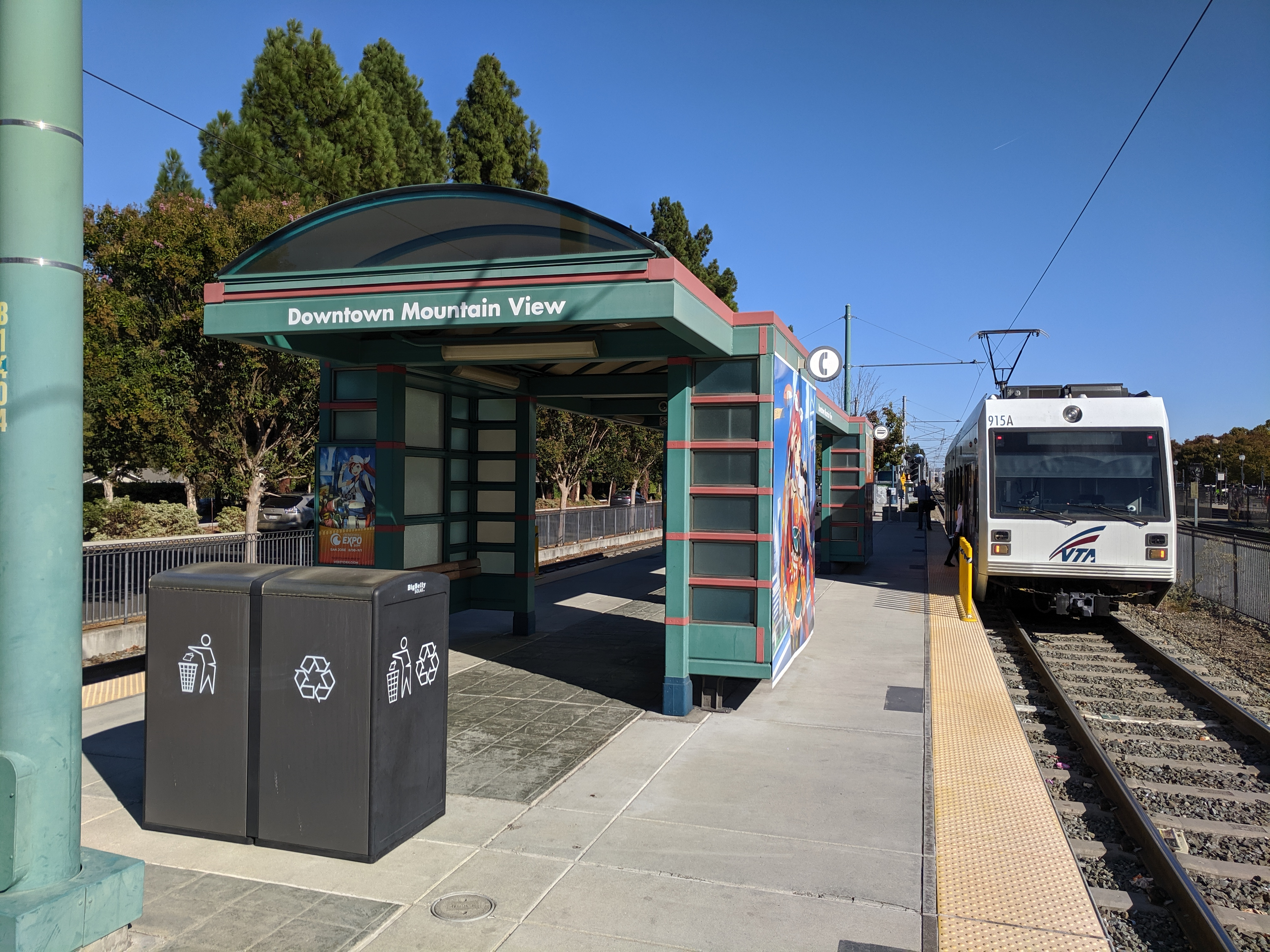
Valley Transportation Authority (VTA) light rail train at Mountain View station

Mountain View station serves as the city's primary transit hub, providing connections between commuter rail, light rail, local and regional bus services, and shuttle routes.

==== Rail service ====
Mountain View is served by Caltrain, which operates rail service between San Francisco and San Jose, with limited service to Gilroy. The city's two Caltrain stations are Mountain View station and San Antonio station.

The city is also served by the Santa Clara Valley Transportation Authority (VTA), which operates light rail and bus services throughout Santa Clara County. Four stations on the Orange Line are located within Mountain View: Mountain View station, the line's northern terminus, as well as Whisman, Middlefield, and Bayshore/NASA stations.

==== Bus service ====
VTA operates several bus routes within Mountain View, including routes 21, 22, 40, 51, 52 and Rapid 522.

The Mountain View Transportation Management Association, in partnership with the City of Mountain View, operates the MVgo and Mountain View Community Shuttle services, both of which are fare-free and open to the public.

MVgo operates four routes (A, B, C, and D) during commute periods, connecting Mountain View station and San Antonio Center with employment centers in the North Bayshore and East Whisman areas.

The Mountain View Community Shuttle operates daily, providing service between residential neighborhoods and destinations including downtown Mountain View, Mountain View station, schools, the public library, parks, shopping centers, and El Camino Hospital. The service operates as a loop route, with the Grey route running clockwise and the Red route running counterclockwise.

Several major employers, including Google, Microsoft, Apple Inc., and NASA Ames Research Center, operate employee shuttle services that stop at Mountain View station. These services are not open to the general public.

=== Utilities ===
Power in the city is operated by Pacific Gas and Electric Company.

The city is one of the region's largest users of Recycled Water, mostly for landscaping in the area North of US-101 covering Shoreline Park and the Google campus. Mountain View uses about 460,000 gallons of recycled water daily, with plans to expand that usage to up to 1.4 million gallons each day.

On August 16, 2006, after over a year of test deployments, Google announced that its implementation of free IEEE 802.11g wireless service for all of the city was fully operational.

On February 19, 2014, the City of Mountain View and Google announced a new connectivity plan for residents, to replace the existing system. Service was to be available along the downtown corridor of Mountain View, primarily on Castro Street. Other areas to be covered included Rengstorff Park, the Mountain View Public Library, Senior, Community, and Teen Centers.

=== Public safety ===
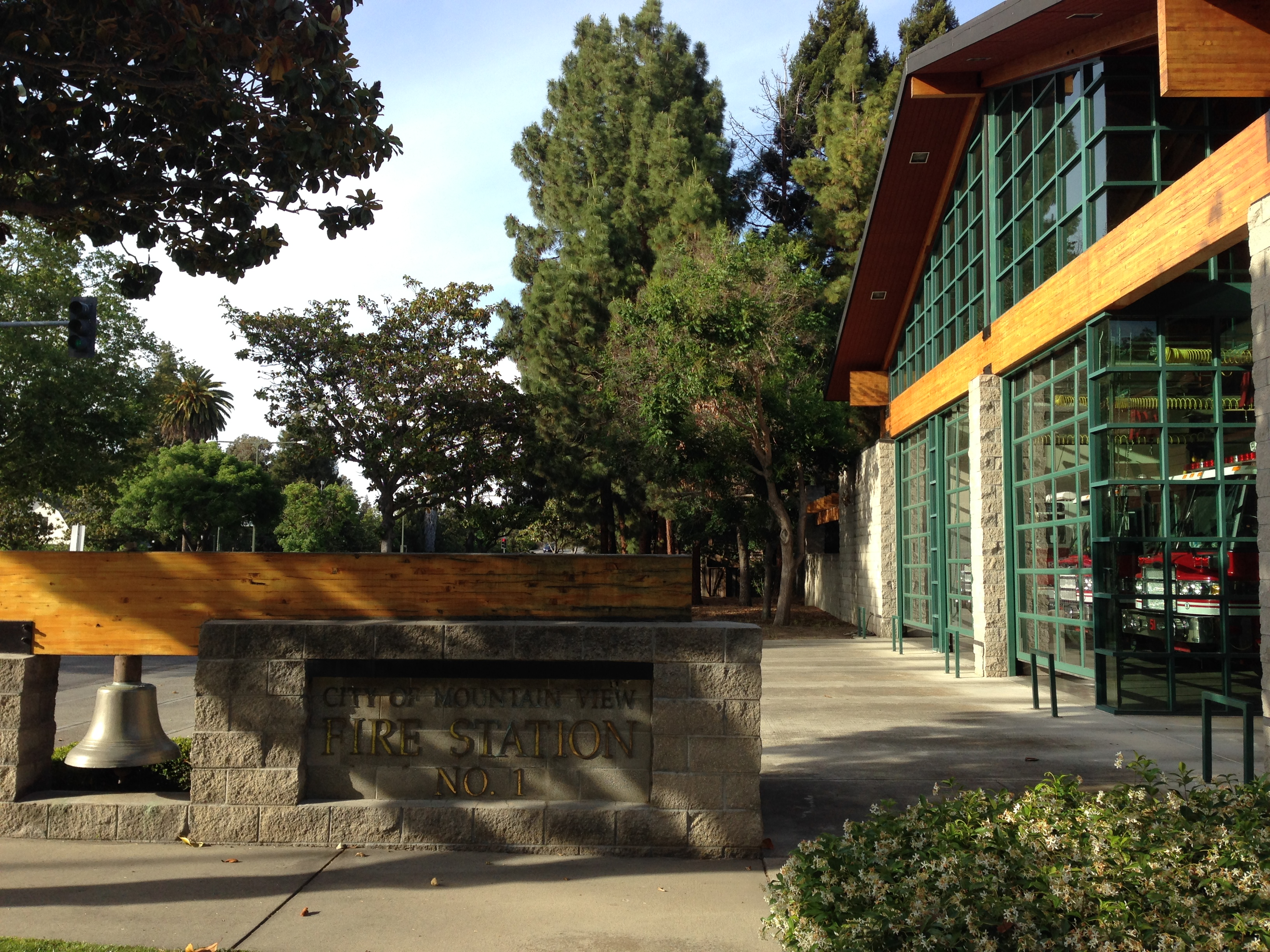
Mountain View Fire Station No. 1

The Mountain View Fire Department maintains five stations, and is responsible for fire protection and emergency medical services.

The Mountain View Police Department maintains patrol, traffic enforcement, detective, K9 and SWAT services for the city, and participates in several task forces, including the Regional Allied Computer Crime Task Force (REACT) and the Regional Auto Theft Task Force (RAATF).

== Sister cities ==
The Mountain View Sister City Affiliation was incorporated in 1974 as an independent non-profit governed by a board of directors. Mountain View is affiliated with the cities of

- Iwata, Shizuoka, Japan
- Hasselt, Belgium

The rock garden in Pioneer Park was a gift from the sister city of Iwata to celebrate the completion of Mountain View's City Hall building. The rock garden is located near the Mountain View Public Library.

== Notable people ==
=== Business ===
- Steve Jobs, technology entrepreneur, co-founder and CEO of Apple, lived in Mountain View during his childhood
- Salman Khan, Khan Academy online educator, resides in Mountain View
- Jan Koum, CEO and co-founder of WhatsApp, grew up in Mountain View

=== Entertainment ===
- Tony Sly, singer/songwriter
- Alex Brightman, actor and singer
- Carroll Clark, seven-time Academy Award for Best Art Direction nominee
- Laura Chavez, blues, soul, and rhythm and blues guitarist, songwriter and record producer
- Assaf Cohen, supporting actor, Heroes and Entourage
- Kurt Kuenne, filmmaker and composer best known for the documentary Dear Zachary: A Letter to a Son About His Father
- Sarah Kinsley, singer-songwriter, was born in Mountain View

=== Media ===
- Dave Finocchio, co-founder of Bleacher Report
- Doris Gates, author and librarian
- Edward Michael Keating (1925–2003), American publisher, journalist, lawyer; founder of Ramparts, member of the New Left movement.
- Jose Antonio Vargas, journalist, filmmaker, immigration rights activist, and namesake of a Mountain View elementary school
- Andy Weir, novelist, who wrote The Martian, while living in Mountain View

=== Politicians ===
- Hugh Fate, dentist and Alaska state representative

=== Sports ===
- Jabri Abdur-Rahim, college basketball player
- Mark Baena, soccer player
- Tully Banta-Cain, two-time Super Bowl champion
- Josh Cohen, soccer player
- Brandon Crawford, professional baseball player in MLB, played for the San Francisco Giants
- Paula Creamer, professional golfer and formerly Women's World Golf Rankings number two player
- Dan Green, powerlifter, world record holder in 220 and 242 lbs weight classes
- Mark Keil, five-time ATP tennis doubles champion
- Mark Leonard, former left fielder for the San Francisco Giants and Baltimore Orioles
- Adam Peters, football scout and executive
- Kenny Roberts Jr., 2000 500cc Road Racing World Champion
- Bianca Sierra, player for Mexico women's national football team
- Ted Barrett , Major League Baseball umpire for 28 seasons ( 1994 to 2022) , Minor League umpire for 5 years( 1989-1994) ( Twice voted Minor League Umpire of the Year) lived in Mountain View while attending Los Altos High School ( Los ALtos, Ca)where he played Football, Basketball and Baseball and Foothill College (Los Altos Hills, Ca ) where he played Football and Basketball before transferring to Cal State UNiv. Hayward where he played Football before attending Joe Brinkman Umpire School in Florida ]]

== See also ==
- Timeline of Mountain View, California
- St. Joseph's Seminary (Mountain View, California)
