= Mountain View Adobe =

Multi-purpose structure in Mountain View, California

- U.S. National Register of Historic Places
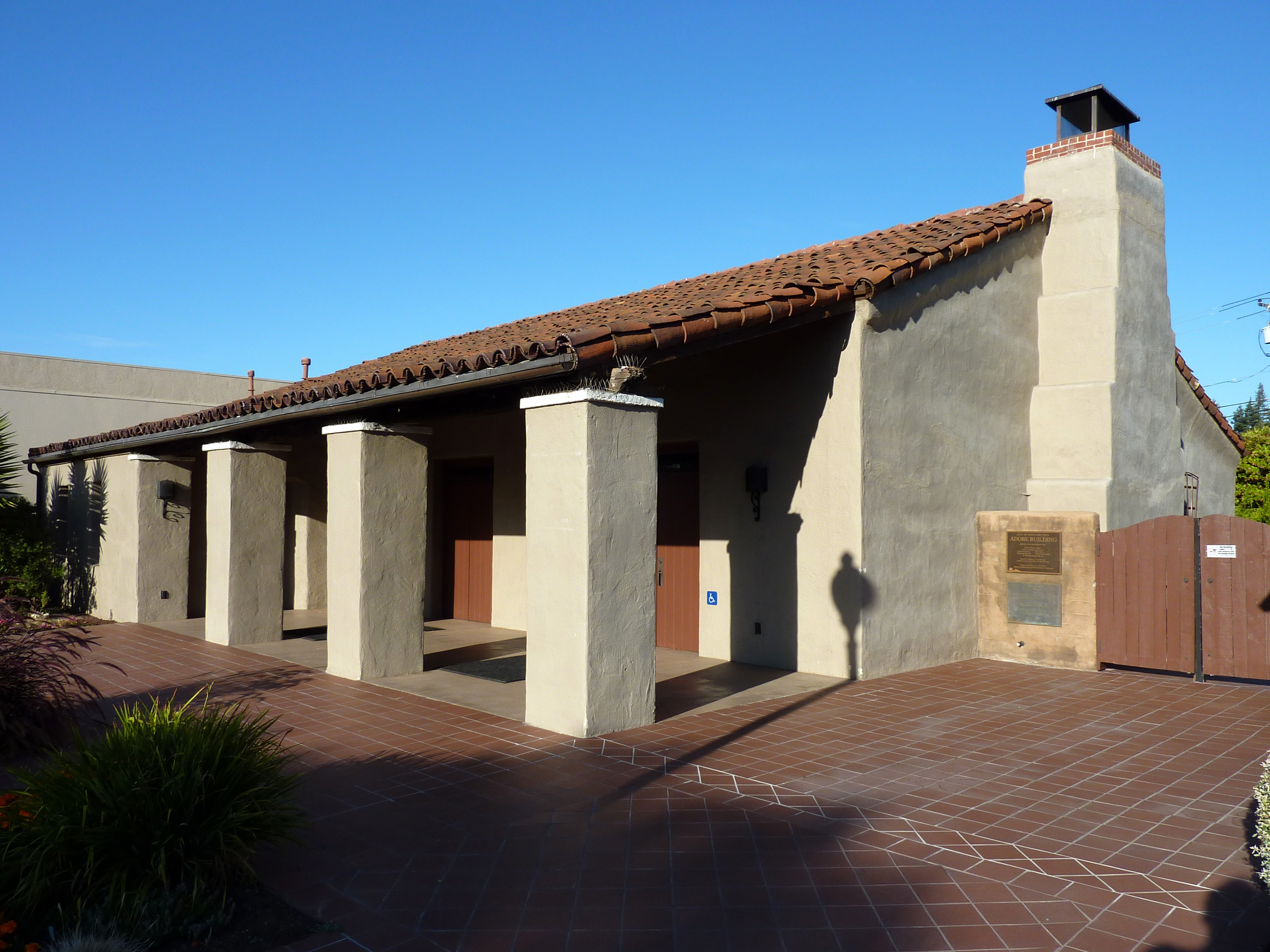
- Street-side exterior

- Location within San Jose, California Location within California Location within the United States
- Location: 157 Moffett Blvd., Mountain View, California
- Coordinates: 37°23′45″N 122°4′37″W
- Built: 1934
- Architectural style: Mission/Spanish Revival
- NRHP reference No.: 02001256
- Added to NRHP: October 28, 2002

The Historic Adobe Building, also known as the Mountain View Adobe, is a multi-purpose structure in Mountain View, California. The building was placed on the National Register of Historic Places on October 28, 2002.

The land under the structure was purchased by Mountain View in 1929 for $10 from Wallace and Alice Angelo; it was used for a pump station and reservoir and served as the town's primary water source. Several years later, the city wanted to create a meeting place between downtown Mountain View and the Navy's Moffett Field; the land's location at the corner of Moffett Boulevard and Central Expressway proved ideal.

The structure was built in 1934 as a New Deal, Civil Works Administration project during the Great Depression, and was constructed by local laborers using adobe bricks. The project also involved the time and money of members of the Junior Chamber of Commerce, one of the building's first tenants. Once World War II broke out, the building was also used as a serviceman's club and hospitality house for veterans.

After the war, the structure took on many more civilian events, and was renamed the Eagle Shack teen center as it hosted high school dances and numerous weddings in the late 1940s. In 1949, the first National Guard leased it for four years as its armory. It then served city programs, including housing the Mountain View Recreation Division and the preparation of a senior lunch program. Over the years, the building had been altered and worn down to the point that it was commonly referred to as the "Adobe Shack".

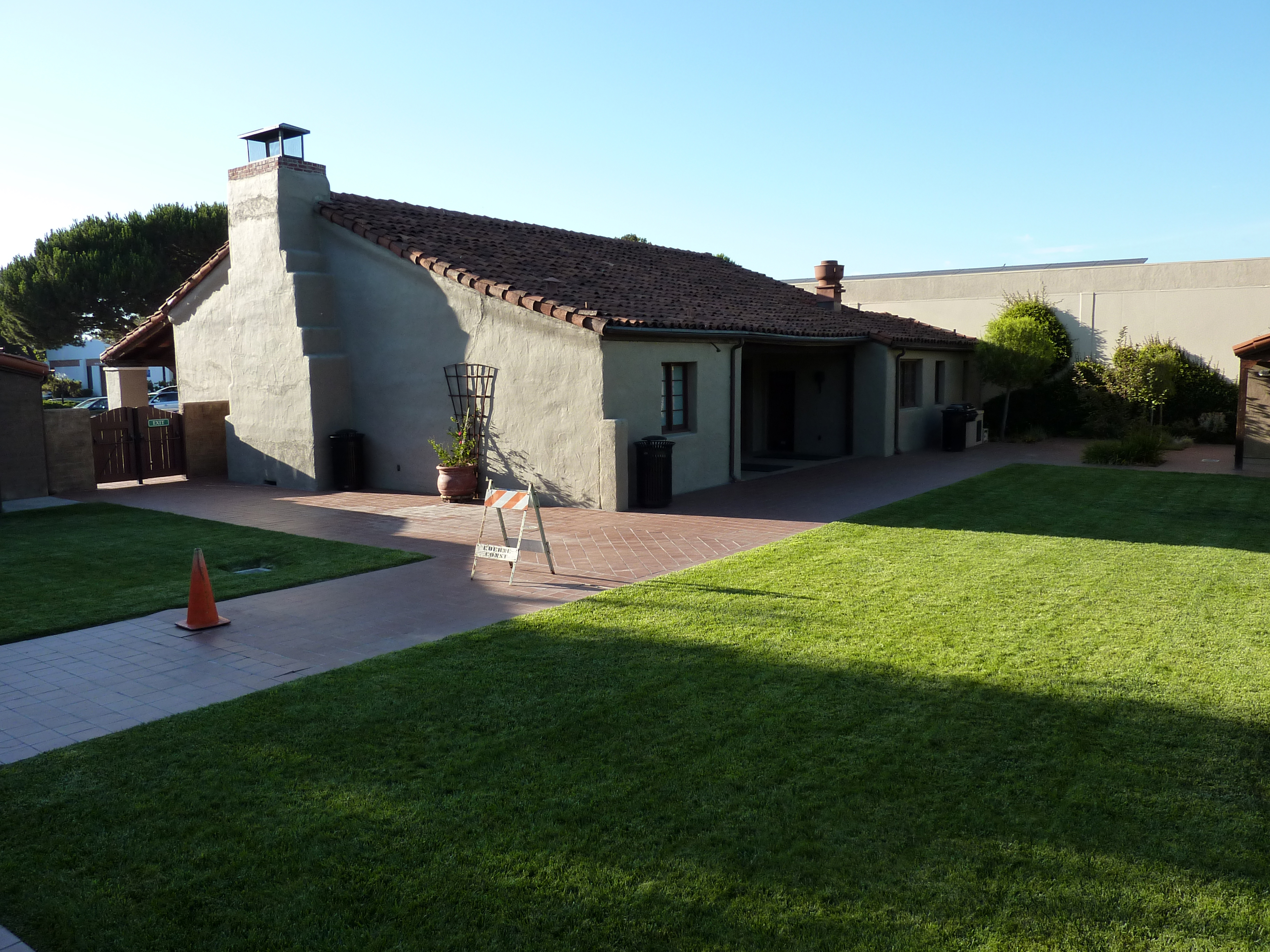
Courtyard view of Historic Adobe Building

In 1987, new seismic building regulations forced the city to close it. As the structure sat abandoned over several years, a community-driven, "Save the Adobe" campaign began in 1995. As a result, the building was restored to its 1935 appearance and reopened for public use on September 29, 2001, at a cost of $1.2 million. The building is now rented by the city as an event center, and includes a modern catering kitchen, office and great room with space for 100 in indoor dining.

The building was designated a California Historical Landmark on August 2, 2002. It was nominated to the NRHP based on its use as a community hall and its method of construction. It was placed on the NRHP primarily in recognition of its historic value as a Works Project Administration project; it was also noted for its aesthetic value in Spanish Revival architecture.
