= Dan Green (powerlifter) =

American powerlifter

- Born: Daniel Green
- Occupation: American Powerlifter
- Height: 5 ft 10 in (1.78 m)

Dan Green is an elite American powerlifter and owner of both Boss Barbell Club and Mountain View Fitness in Mountain View, California. His best competition lifts in the 242 lb (110 kg) weight class are an 848 lb (385 kg) squat, a 530 lb (240 kg) bench press, and an 837.5 lb (380 kg) deadlift. His best powerlifting meet total at 242 lbs is 2210 lb (1002.5 kg). His best competition lifts in the 220 lb (100 kg) weight class are an 837.5 lb (380 kg) squat, a 501 lb (227.5 kg) bench press, and an 827 lb (375 kg) deadlift. His best total at 220 lbs is 2110 lbs (957.5 kg).

== World records ==
Weight Class: 220 lbs

- Raw Squat without Wraps: 783 lbs
- Raw Total without Wraps: 2099 lbs

Weight Class: 242 lbs

- Raw Total with and without Wraps: 2210 lbs
- Raw Total without Wraps: 2083 lbs

== Achievements ==
Named number 20 in the top 50 World's fittest male athletes in 2014 by Men's Health magazine.

== Boss Barbell Club ==
Dan Green is the owner of Boss Barbell Club in Mountain View, California where he is also a Personal Trainer.

== See also ==
- List of powerlifters
