= El Camino Health =

Coordinates: 37°22′08″N 122°04′48″W

- El Camino Healthcare District

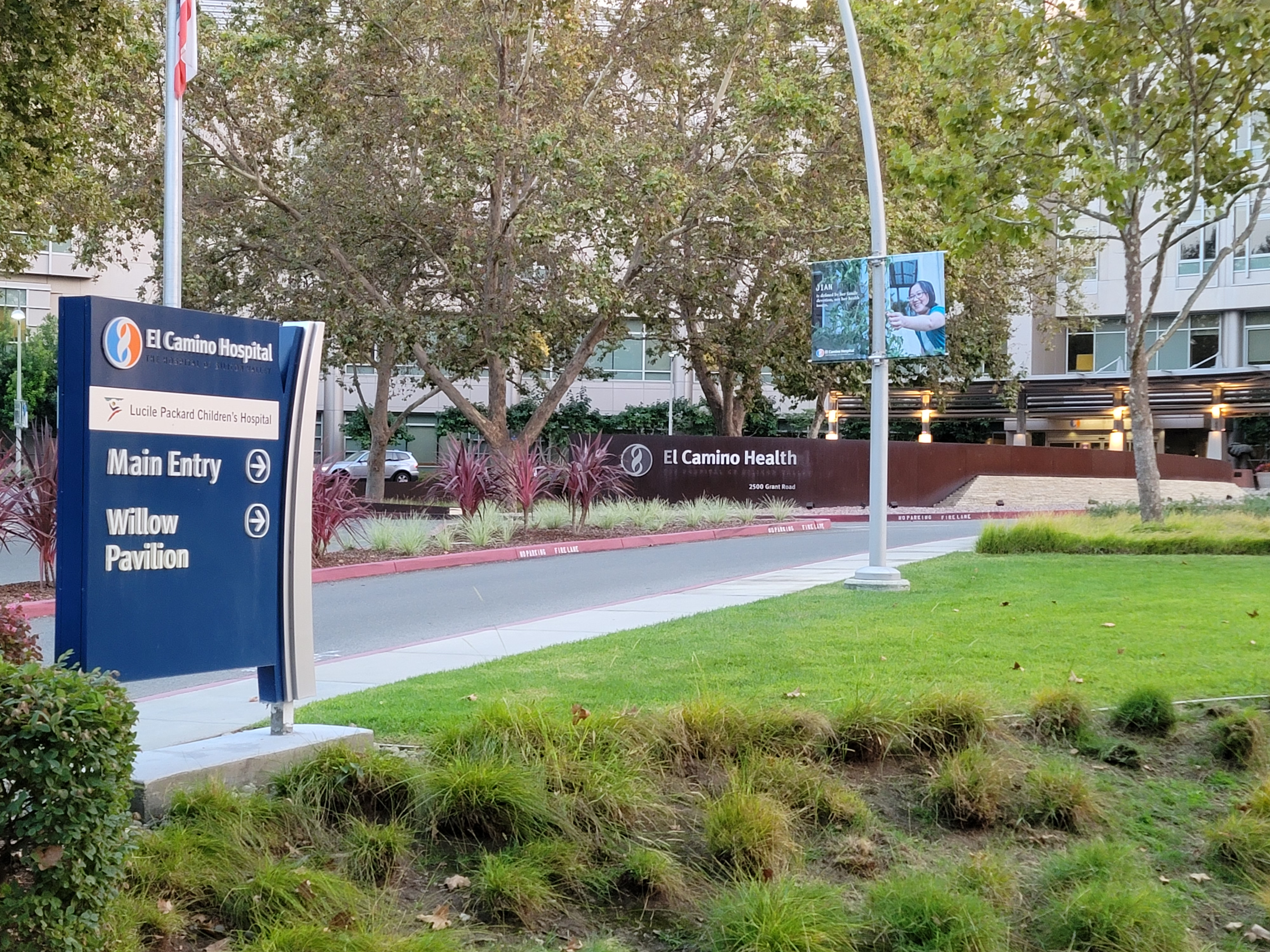

Geography
- Location: Mountain View, Los Gatos, California, US

Organisation
- Type: District

History
- Founded: 1961

Links
- Website: https://www.elcaminohealth.org/

El Camino Health is a non-profit hospital with 420 beds (Mountain View Main Campus) based on a 41-acre (17 ha) campus in Mountain View, California. There is a second, smaller hospital campus, El Camino Hospital, Los Gatos, in Los Gatos, with additional satellite clinics in the West Valley/Lower Peninsula area of Silicon Valley. Since September 2017, the CEO has been Dan Woods.

El Camino Health serves residents in the El Camino Healthcare District, a special tax district that includes Mountain View, Los Altos, Los Altos Hills, and portions of Sunnyvale, Santa Clara, and Cupertino, as well as people in surrounding communities. The hospital opened in 1961 following a successful ballot initiative in 1956 to establish the tax district and fund the construction of the hospital with $7.3 million in bonds. In 2009 it bought the former Community Hospital of Los Gatos and renamed it El Camino Hospital Los Gatos. Land was acquired in 2016 for a campus in San Jose.

El Camino Health has several times been designated a nursing magnet hospital by the American Nursing Credentialing Center. Specialties include acute rehabilitation, cardiac care, dialysis, cancer care, maternal child health services, orthopedics, neurosurgery and behavioral health.

U.S. News ranked El Camino Hospital #16 (out of 413 hospitals) for Best Hospitals in California and #2 for Best Hospitals in San Jose (out of 13 hospitals).
