= Alta Vista High School (California) =

Continuation high school in California, United States

Location
- 1325 Bryant Avenue, Mountain View, California; United States
- Coordinates: 37°21′38″N 122°04′00″W

Information
- School district: Mountain View-Los Altos Union High School District
- Staff: 5.88 (FTE)
- Grades: 9-12
- Enrollment: 72 (2023-2024)
- Student to teacher ratio: 11.73
- Mascot: Aztec
- Accreditation: Western Association of Schools and Colleges
- Website: avhs.mvla.net

Alta Vista High School is a continuation high school that is part of the Mountain View-Los Altos Union High School District. Their staff includes one principal, two counselor/teachers, six full-time teachers, three instructional aides, a director of coordinated services/case management, CHAC/AACI counselors, Stanford Medical School support staff, an office manager, and a technical support. The school's mascot is an Aztec.

== See also ==
- Mountain View-Los Altos Union High School District
