= Mountain View–Los Altos Union High School District =

School district in California, United States

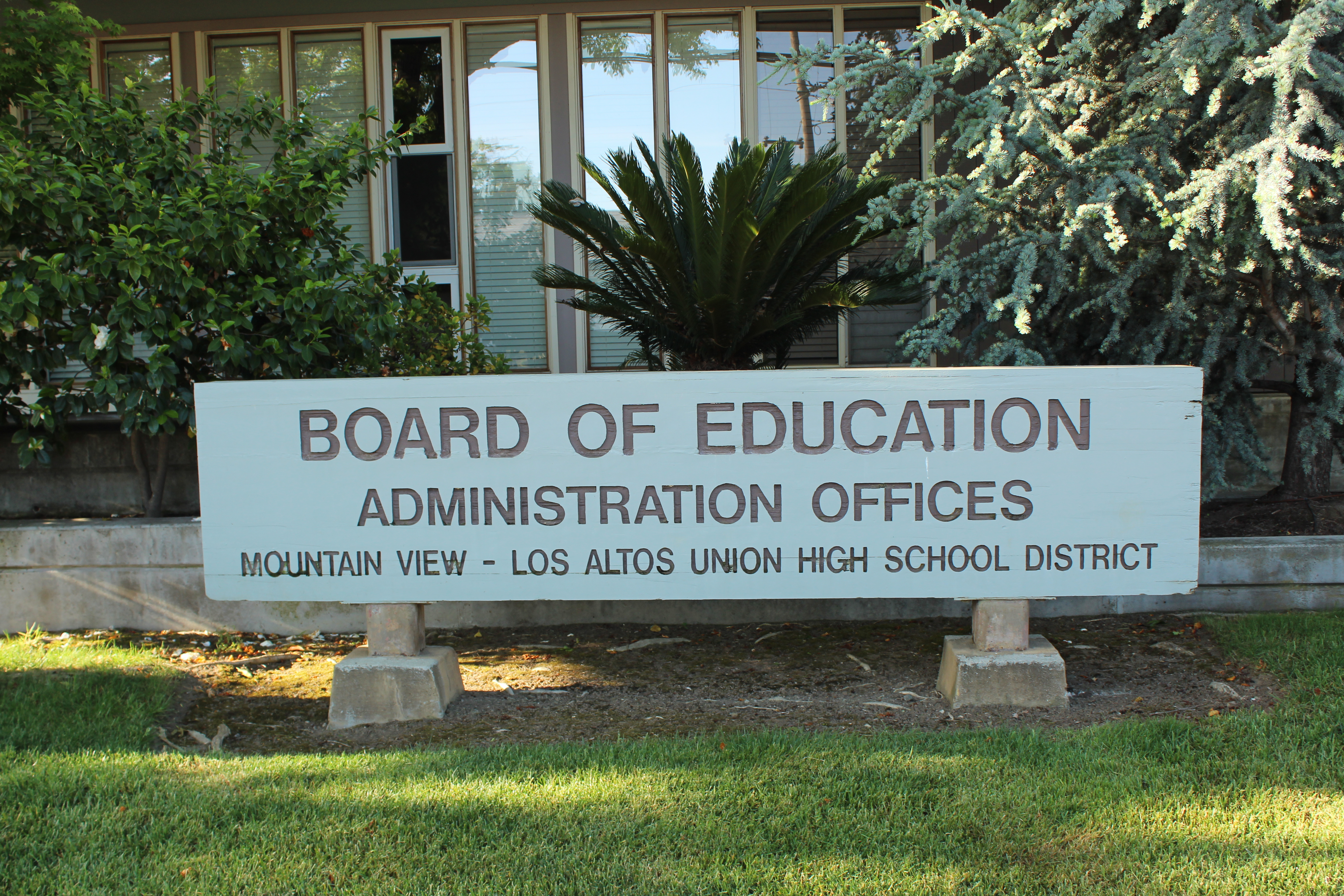

Address
- 1299 Bryant Avenue Mountain View, California, 94040; United States
- Coordinates: 37.361005°N 122.064836°W

District information
- Type: Public
- Grades: 9–12
- Established: 1902
- Superintendent: Eric Volta
- NCES District ID: 0626310

Students and staff
- Students: 4,563 (2020–2021)
- Teachers: 236.58 (FTE)
- Staff: 213.58 (FTE)
- Student–teacher ratio: 19.29:1

Other information
- Website: www.mvla.net

The Mountain View–Los Altos Union High School District (MVLA) is a school district serving high school students in Mountain View, Los Altos, and Los Altos Hills, California. The elementary and middle school students in the region are served by the Mountain View Whisman School District and Los Altos School District.

== History ==
Mountain View High School was founded in 1902, on Castro Street. In 1924, as enrollment increased, the school was moved to a new campus on Castro Street and the original was demolished. Moffett Field's opening in 1933 caused a further increase in enrollment. Los Altos High School was added in 1955 and Chester F. Awalt High School, named after a long-time school board trustee, was added in 1961; Mountain View High School students were diverted there for a year to allow for the remodeling of their home school.

The school district saw declining enrollment—5,200 students in 1970, compared to a projected 2,300 in the late 1980s—so the original Mountain View High School location was closed in 1981, and was demolished in 1987. Students were distributed to the other two schools; Awalt was renamed to Mountain View, while the original Mountain View High's mascot and colors were given to Los Altos High.

== High schools ==
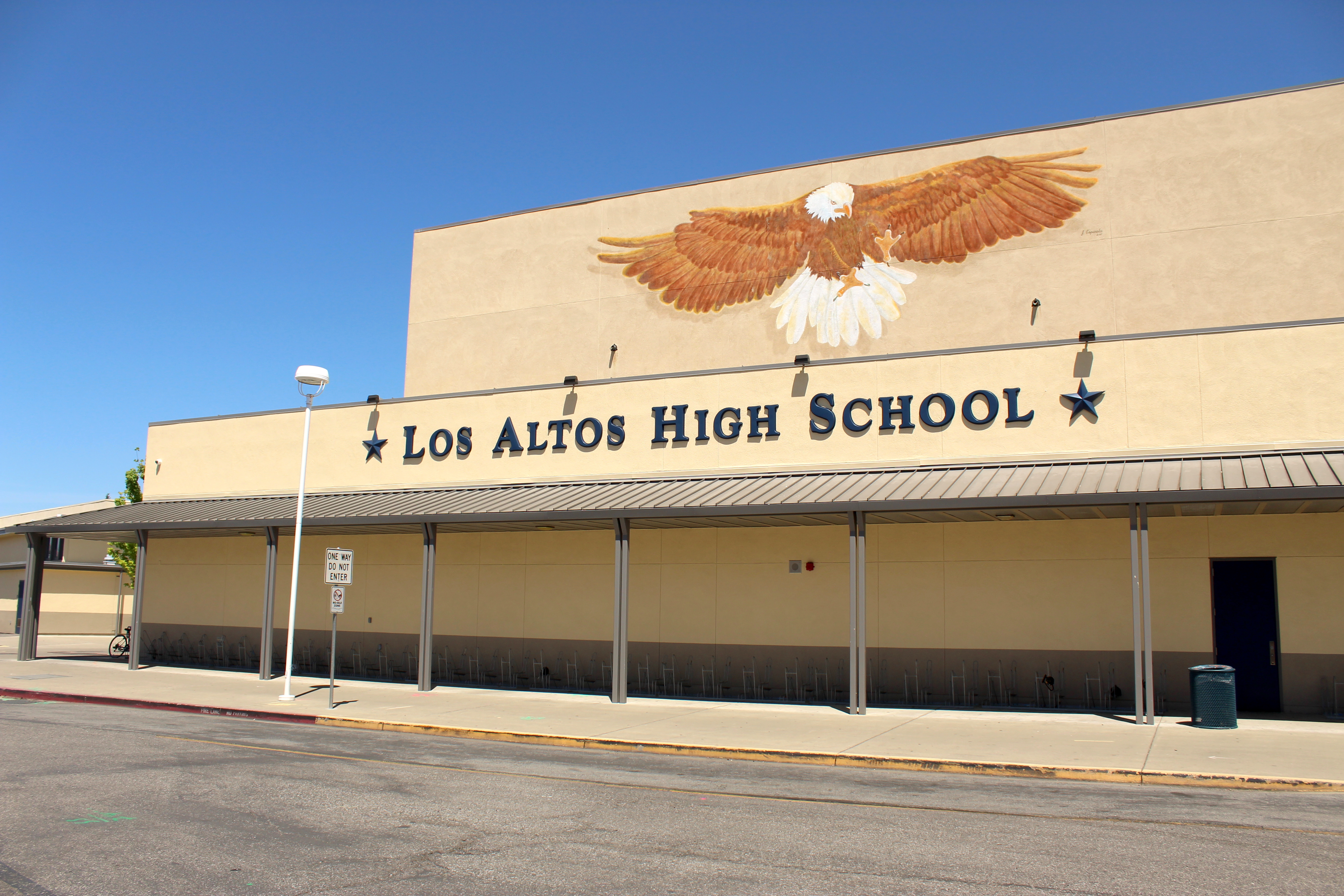
Los Altos High School

=== Los Altos High School ===
Los Altos High School was founded in 1956. Its school mascot is the eagle.

The 2018-19 school year had 2,227 students in attendance. The student population was 50% male and 50% female. Its racial makeup was 38% White, 26% Hispanic, 26% Asian, 7% Two or More Races and 1% Black.

A major renovation and set of new buildings was completed in 2002, and again in 2013. As of May 2020, the school is undergoing construction as part of a district-wide program to modernize classrooms.

In 1954, the land was purchased from apricot farmers to make way for the new school. The Class of 1958 was the first to graduate.

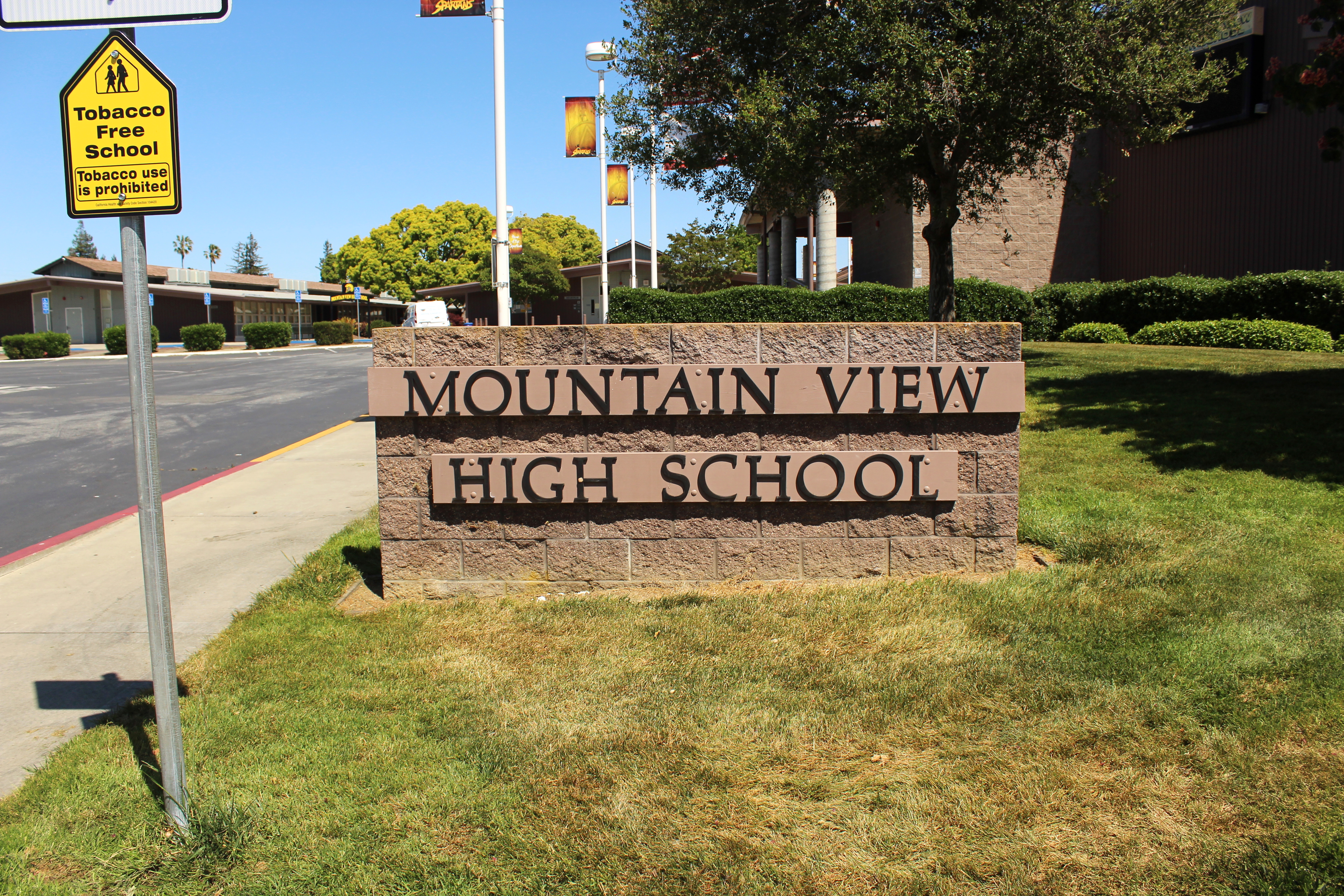
Mountain View High School

=== Mountain View High School ===
Mountain View High School was founded in 1902. Its school mascot is the Spartan.

The 2018-19 school year had 2,062 students in attendance. The student population was 51% male and 49% female. Its racial makeup was 40% White, 24% Asian, 23% Hispanic, 11% Two or More Races and 2% Black.

The school was founded at the corner of El Camino Real and Calderon Avenue in Mountain View, California. It was moved in 1924 to Castro Street in what is now downtown Mountain View, and moved again in 1981 to its current location on the corner of Truman and Bryant taking the place of Awalt High School.

== Continuation high school ==
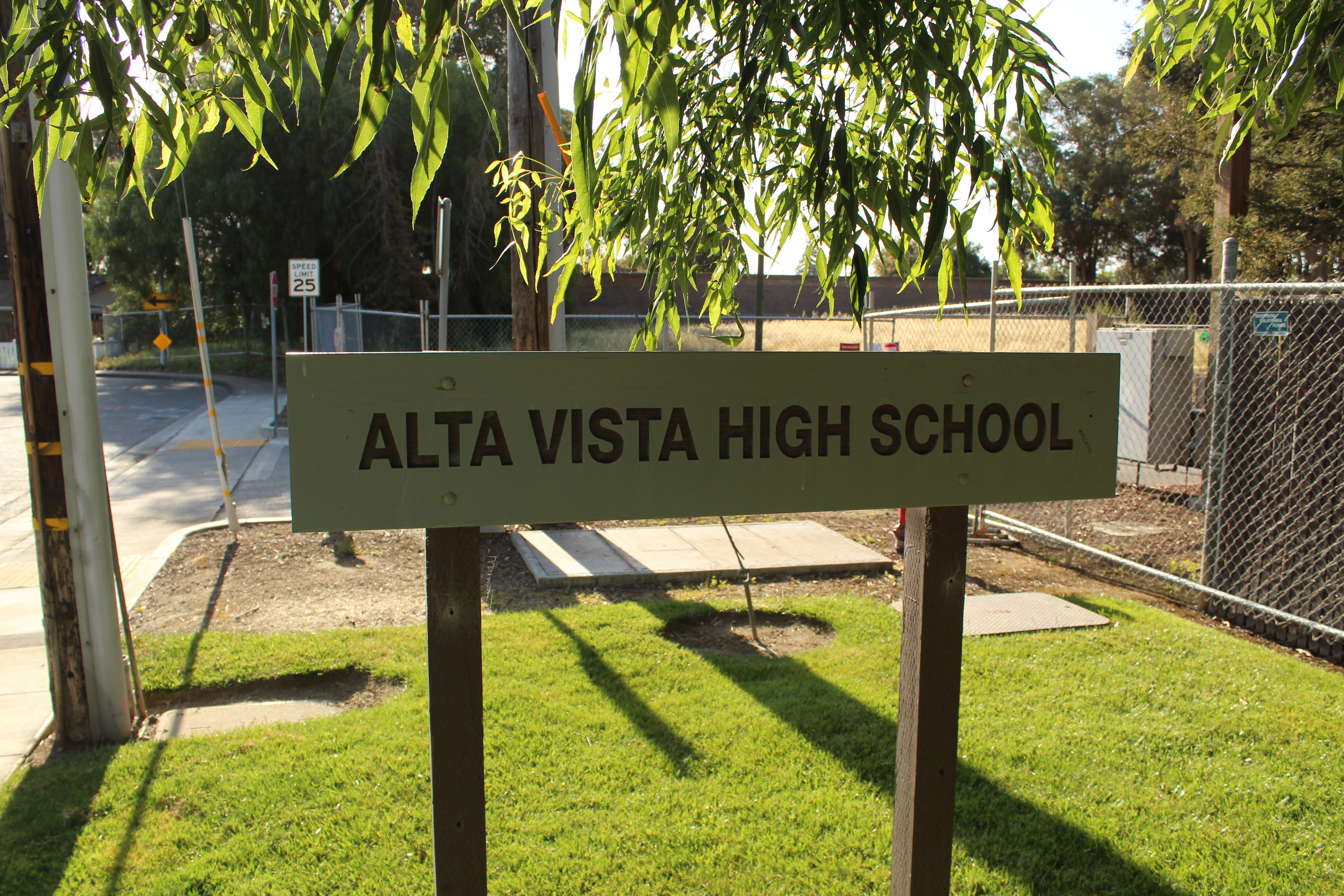
Alta Vista High School

=== Alta Vista High School ===
Alta Vista High School is a continuation school located at 1325 Bryant Ave., Mountain View, CA 94040.

The 2018-19 school year had 79 students in attendance. The student population was 57% male and 43% female. Its racial makeup was 72% Hispanic, 18% White, 5% Black, 3% Asian and 3% Native Hawaiian/Pacific Islander. Its student to teacher ratio, at 10.57, is well below the state average.

Since 1999, the school has been continually recognized as a Model Continuation School in the state of California.

== Adult school ==
=== MVLA Adult School ===
MVLA Adult School is an adult school located at 333 Moffett Blvd., Mountain View, CA 94043. It was accredited by the WASC in 1965.

== Transportation ==
The school district only has one bus for transportation: a 2002 Blue Bird All American RE, which runs on an 8.1L John Deere CNG engine.

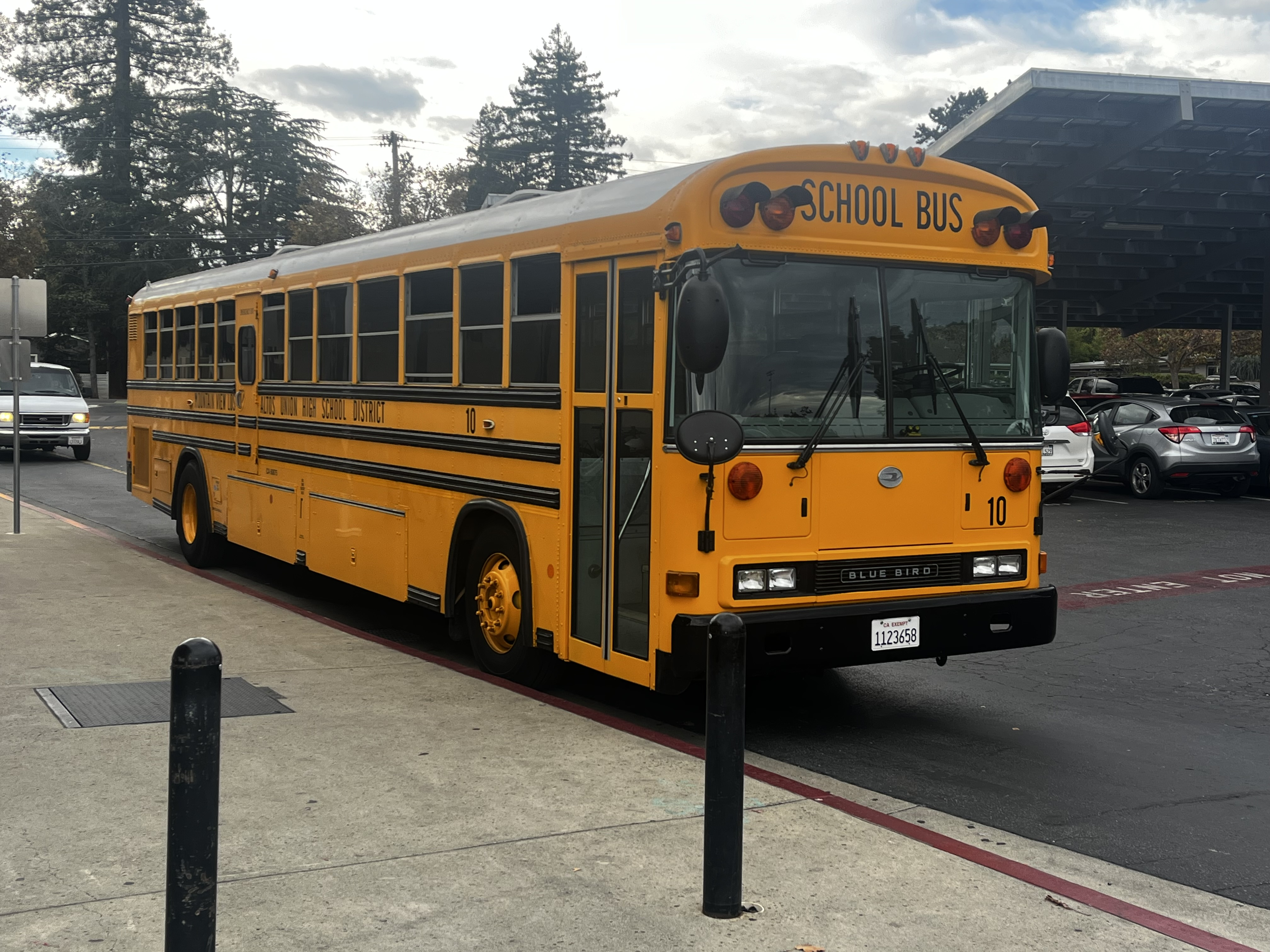

== See also ==
- List of closed secondary schools in California
