= Mountain View Whisman School District =

School district in California, United States

Address
- 1400 Montecito Avenue Mountain View, California Mountain View, California, 94043; United States

District information
- Type: Public School District
- Grades: K–8
- Established: 1909
- Superintendent: Jeffrey Baier
- Schools: 11
- Budget: US$56,501,298
- NCES District ID: 0626280

Students and staff
- Students: 4,753 (2020–2021)
- Teachers: 240.14 (FTE)
- Staff: 276.01 (FTE)
- Student–teacher ratio: 19.79:1

Other information
- Website: www.mvwsd.org

Mountain View Whisman School District is a public school district located in Mountain View, California. It consists of nine primary schools and two middle schools. High schoolers living in Mountain View are served by the Mountain View–Los Altos Union High School District.

== History ==
Mountain View Whisman School District was formed in 2001 as the merger of two smaller districts, namely the Mountain View Elementary and Whisman School Districts, after a vote in 2000. Talks about merging the schools had been ongoing since the 1960s; the merger was completed due to the pullout of the U.S. Navy from the nearby Moffett Federal Airfield in 1994, which dropped enrollment.

The first schoolhouse in Mountain View, a one-room house teaching a handful of families' children, was established in 1852. The Mountain View School District was formed in 1854, and in 1857 a public school for about forty students was built. The one-room San Antonio School was built in 1867 and was discontinued in 1917. Whisman School District, named after influential settler John W. Whisman, was established in 1869 and its first, one-room schoolhouse was built in 1871.

== Middle schools ==
=== Crittenden Middle School ===
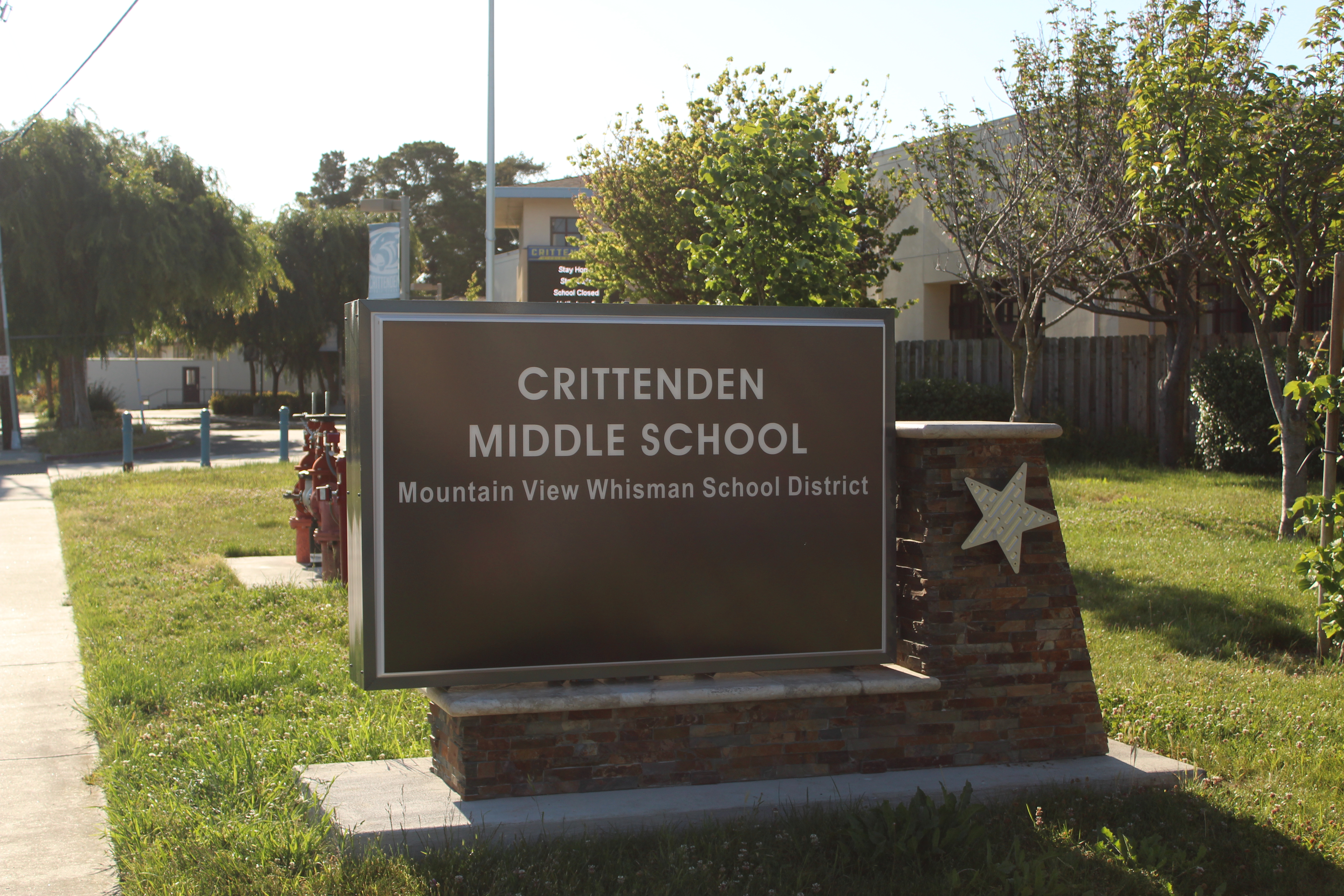
Crittenden Middle School

Crittenden Middle School is located at 1701 Rock St., Mountain View, CA 94043. The school mascot is the panther. Before the district's merger, the school was part of the Whisman School District.

The 2018-19 school year had 707 students in attendance. The student population was 52% male and 48% female. Its racial makeup was 48% Hispanic, 25% White, 14% Asian, 9% Two or More Races, 3% Black and 1% Native Hawaiian/Pacific Islander.

The school was honored as a California Distinguished School in 1990, 1992, and 2019.

=== Isaac Newton Graham Middle School ===
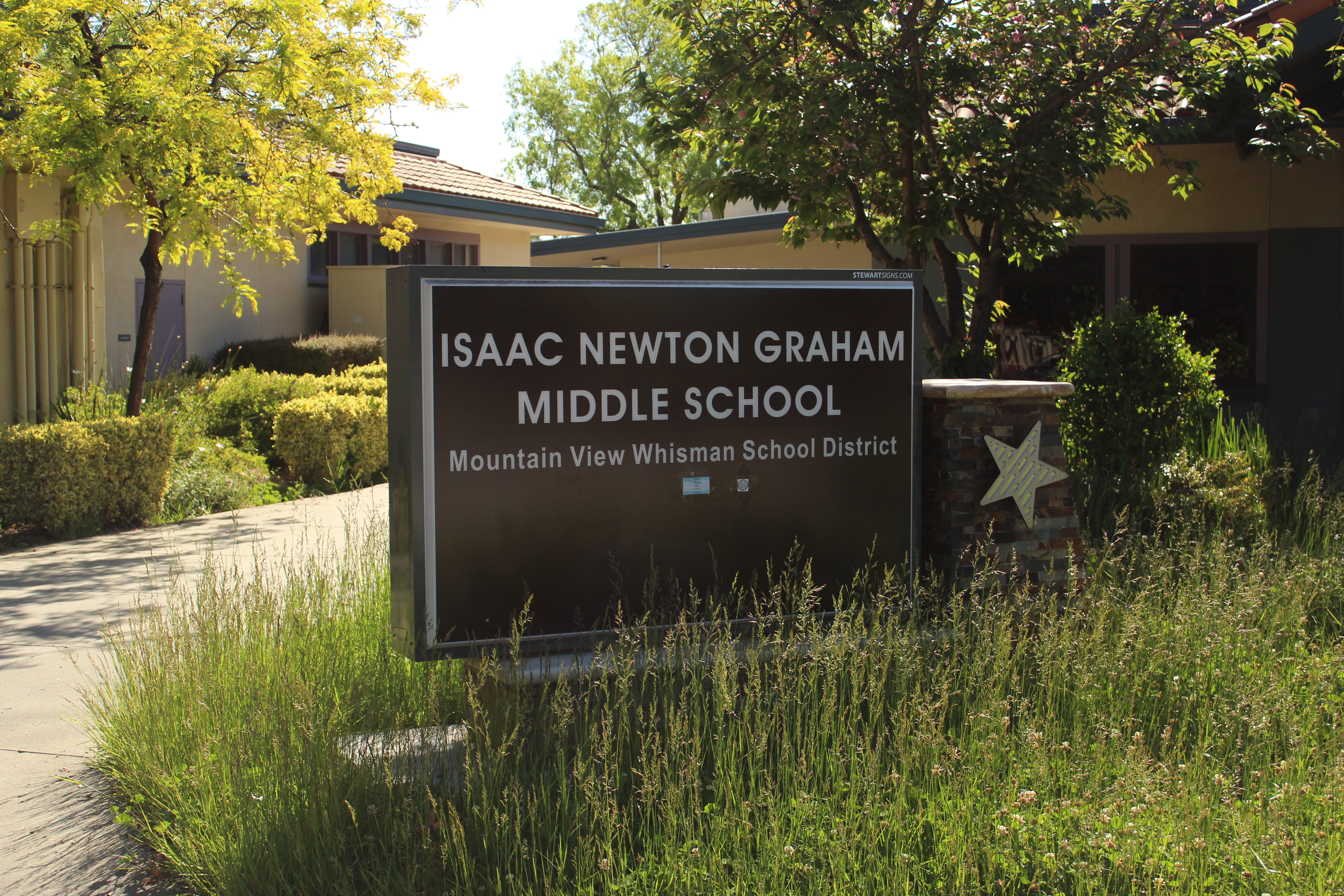
Graham Middle School

Isaac Newton Graham Middle School, known colloquially as Graham Middle School, is located at 1175 Castro St., Mountain View, CA 94040. The school mascot is the bear. Before the district merger, the school was part of the Mountain View Elementary School District.

The 2018-19 school year had 865 students in attendance. The student population was 53% male and 47% female. Its racial makeup was 40% Hispanic, 31% White, 16% Asian, 11% Two or More Races and 1% Black.

The school was honored as a California Distinguished School in 1986, 1990, 1992, 2013, and 2019.

In 2015, it received the 2015 California Gold Ribbon Schools Award.

== Elementary schools ==
- Amy Imai Elementary School
- Benjamin Bubb Elementary School
- Edith Landels Elementary School
- Gabriela Mistral Elementary School
- Jose Antonio Vargas Elementary
- Mariano Castro Elementary School
- Monta Loma Elementary School
- Stevenson Elementary School
- Theuerkauf Elementary School
