= Crossman =

Crossman may refer to:

== People ==
- Abdiel Crossman (1804–1859), U.S. politician in New Orleans
- Craig Crossman (born before 1995), American newspaper columnist
- Danny Crossman (born 1967), American football coach
- Doug Crossman (born 1960), Canadian ice hockey player
- Edgar G. Crossman (1895–1967), American lawyer, soldier and diplomat
- Fletcher Crossman (born 1965), British artist who has relocated to New York
- Frank Crossman (born before 2002), American materials scientist and engineer, and writer
- Garret Crossman (born 1982), Australian rugby league player
- Gary Crossman (born 1955), Canadian politician in New Brunswick
- George Crossman (1877–1947), English cricketer
- Graeme Crossman (born 1945), New Zealand international rugby union player
- Guy Crossman (1915–1989), Canadian Member of Parliament
- Kimberley Crossman (born 1988), New Zealand actress, dancer, stand-up comedian and cheerleader
- Mervyn Crossman (1935–2017), Australian field hockey player who competed in the 1960 and 1964 Summer Olympics
- Owen Crossman (1903–1963), rugby union player
- Pat Crossman (1940–2002), Canadian politician in New Brunswick
- Richard Crossman (AKA Dick Crossman, 1907–1974), British Labour Party politician and author
- Samuel Crossman (1623–1683), English churchman and hymnwriter
- William Crossman (1830–1901), British soldier and politician

== Places ==
- Crossman, Western Australia, a town located in the Wheatbelt region
- Crossman (VTA), a light rail station operated by Santa Clara Valley Transportation Authority (VTA), located in Sunnyvale, California
- Crossman Bridge (AKA Gilbert Road Bridge), a truss bridge located in Warren, Massachusetts
- Crossman Pond, in Kingston, Massachusetts

== See also ==
- Crossmans, New Jersey, a neighborhood in Sayreville, Middlesex County, New Jersey, United States
- George Crossman House, a historic home located in the East Falls Church section of Arlington, Virginia
