= Gressmann =

Gressmann, Gressman may refer to:

- Eugene Gressman (1917–2010), American legal scholar
- Evelyn Gressmann (1943–2018), German actress
- Hugo Gressmann (1877–1927), a German Old Testament scholar
- Philip Gressman (born 1978), American mathematician
- Thomas S. Gressman, an American science fiction writer
- Uwe Greßmann (1933–1969), German writer
- 4396 Gressmann (1981 JH), a main-belt asteroid discovered on 1981 by Ted Bowell

== See also ==
Related & Similar surnames

- Kressmann
- Cressman
- Grasmann (Grasman), Grassmann (Grassman), Gruzman
