= Grassmann (surname) =

Grassmann, Graßmann or Grassman is a German surname. Notable people with the surname include:

Grassmann

- Dietrich Graßmann (1920–1991), German Luftwaffe pilot
- Hans Grassmann (born 1960), German physicist
- Hermann Grassmann (1809–1877), German linguist, physicist, and mathematician (sometimes misspelled Grassman)
- Justus Grassmann (died 1961), German World War I flying ace
- Marcelo Grassmann (1925–2013), Brazilian engraver and draughtsman
- Thomas Grassmann (1890–1970), American historian and archaeologist

Grassman

- Edward Grassman (1882–1952), American politician

== See also ==
- Grossmann (surname)
