= Keegan Croucher =

American football player

Profile
- Position: Quarterback

Personal information
- Listed height: 6 ft 4 in (1.93 m)
- Listed weight: 200 lb (91 kg)

Keegan Croucher is an American football quarterback. He is committed to play college football for the Ole Miss Rebels.

== Early life ==
Croucher attended Fonda-Fultonville Central High School in Fonda, New York his freshman year where he passed for 2,957 yards and 31 touchdowns. After the year he transferred to Cheshire Academy in Cheshire, Connecticut, where he spent his sophomore and junior years. As a sophomore he passed for 2,052 yards with 20 touchdowns and as a junior had 1,692 yards with 16 touchdowns. After the year he transferred to Baylor School in Chattanooga, Tennessee for his senior year.

Croucher is rated by Rivals.com as a five-star recruit and the number one quarterback in the 2027 class. He committed to the University of Mississippi to play college football.
