= Bennett Boskey =

American lawyer and judge

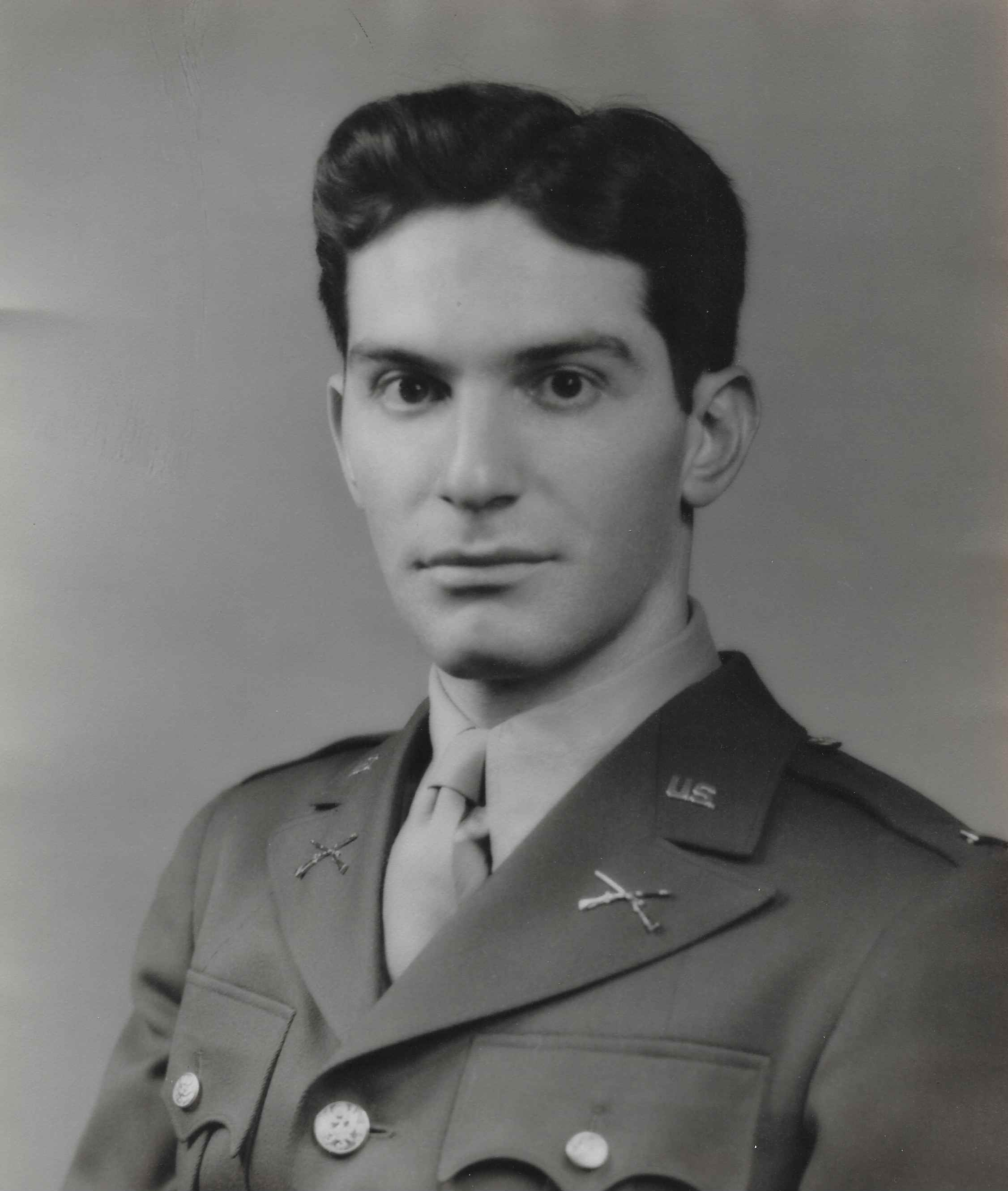
- Born: August 14, 1916; New York City, New York, U.S.
- Died: May 11, 2016 (aged 99); Bethesda, Maryland, U.S.
- Education: Williams College (BA); Harvard University (LLB)
- Occupation: Attorney
- Known for: Clerk for Judge Learned Hand
- Spouse: Shirley Ecker
- Parent(s): Meyer Boskey, Janet Lauterstein
- Relatives: Betty Jane Boskey

Bennett Boskey (August 14, 1916 – May 11, 2016) was an American lawyer who clerked for Judge Learned Hand and for two U.S. Supreme Court justices, Stanley Reed and Chief Justice Harlan F. Stone. He helped to craft the standing doctrine in Ex parte Quirin which enabled the U.S. Supreme Court to hear a case against German military saboteurs, which has had legal implications during the war on terror in the first two decades of the 21st century.

== Early life and education ==
Bennett Boskey was born in New York City and grew up on Central Park West on the Upper West Side of Manhattan, the son of Janet Lauterstein (July 12, 1890 – May 26, 1983), and a prosperous lawyer, Meyer Boskey (July 24, 1883 – February 10, 1969). Bennett's younger sister, Betty Jane Boskey (November 9, 1918 – December 28, 1984), married Lloyd Stanley Snedeker (May 27, 1916 – December 14, 1977) and lived in Great Neck, Long Island, New York. He was raised in a household committed to equality. In 1899, his father co-founded the Delta Sigma Phi fraternity at New York's City College. The fraternity admitted Christians and Jews at a time when others refused to mix religions. In 1914, two years before Bennett's birth, Meyer Boskey withdrew as National Secretary of the fraternity when it limited its membership to white Christians.

In 1916, Meyer Boskey advertised his legal services in the firm of Brown & Boskey as "general practice in all courts." His son, Bennett, would later describe his law practice in the same way.

After arriving at Williams College at age 15, Boskey was graduated in 1935 and then studied economics for a year at the University of Chicago at the height of the Great Depression. In 1939, he graduated from Harvard Law School, where he came to the attention of then Professor Felix Frankfurter and was a member of the Board of Editors of the Harvard Law Review.

In 1940, Bennett Boskey married Shirley Ecker (January 15, 1918 – October 13, 1998), who had also grown up on the Upper West Side of Manhattan. She graduated Phi Beta Kappa from Vassar College, attended Columbia Law School, and received her law degree from George Washington University. She was the daughter of two successful real estate attorneys, Judge Samuel Ecker (August 21, 1882 – March 30, 1970) and Frances Schuman (January 14, 1891 – July 16, 1979), and shared her husband's childhood immersion in law. In Washington, D.C., Shirley Boskey worked at the World Bank, rising to become its first female head of department as Director of the International Relations Department, where "she was responsible for managing the...relationship with other intergovernmental organizations such as the United Nations." The Shirley Ecker Boskey Chair in International Studies at Vassar is endowed in her memory, and her papers are archived at Princeton University.

== Judicial clerkships ==
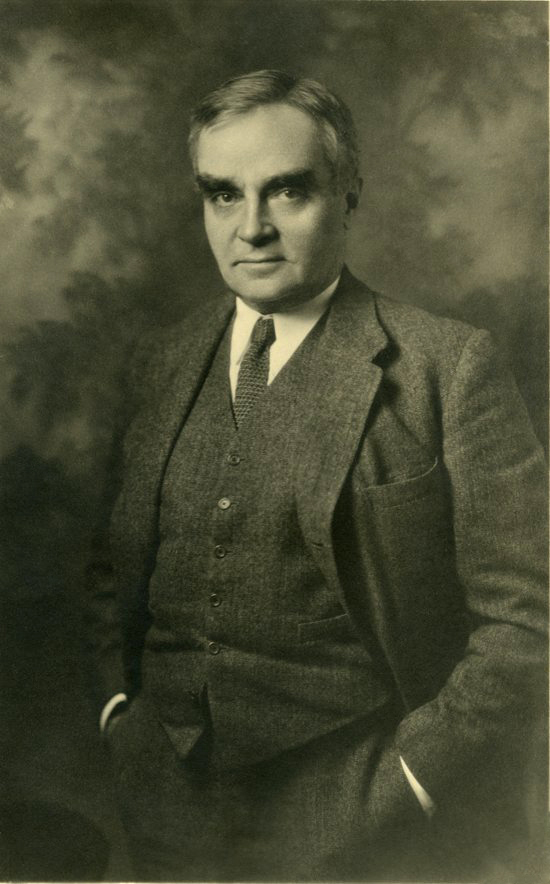
Learned Hand circa 1910

Bennett Boskey was a law clerk for a year (1939–1940) for Judge Learned Hand of the U.S. Court of Appeals for the Second Circuit in New York. As the story goes, "Hand accepted Boskey sight unseen after Felix Frankfurter...recommended the student."

In 1940, Boskey came to Washington, where he clerked at the U.S. Supreme Court for Justice Stanley Reed from 1940 to 1941, and Chief Justice Harlan F. Stone from 1941 to 1943.

In October 1941, Justice Robert H. Jackson joined the Court, an event Boskey recalled fondly in a 2005 essay.

== Ex parte Quirin: Saboteurs case standing doctrine ==
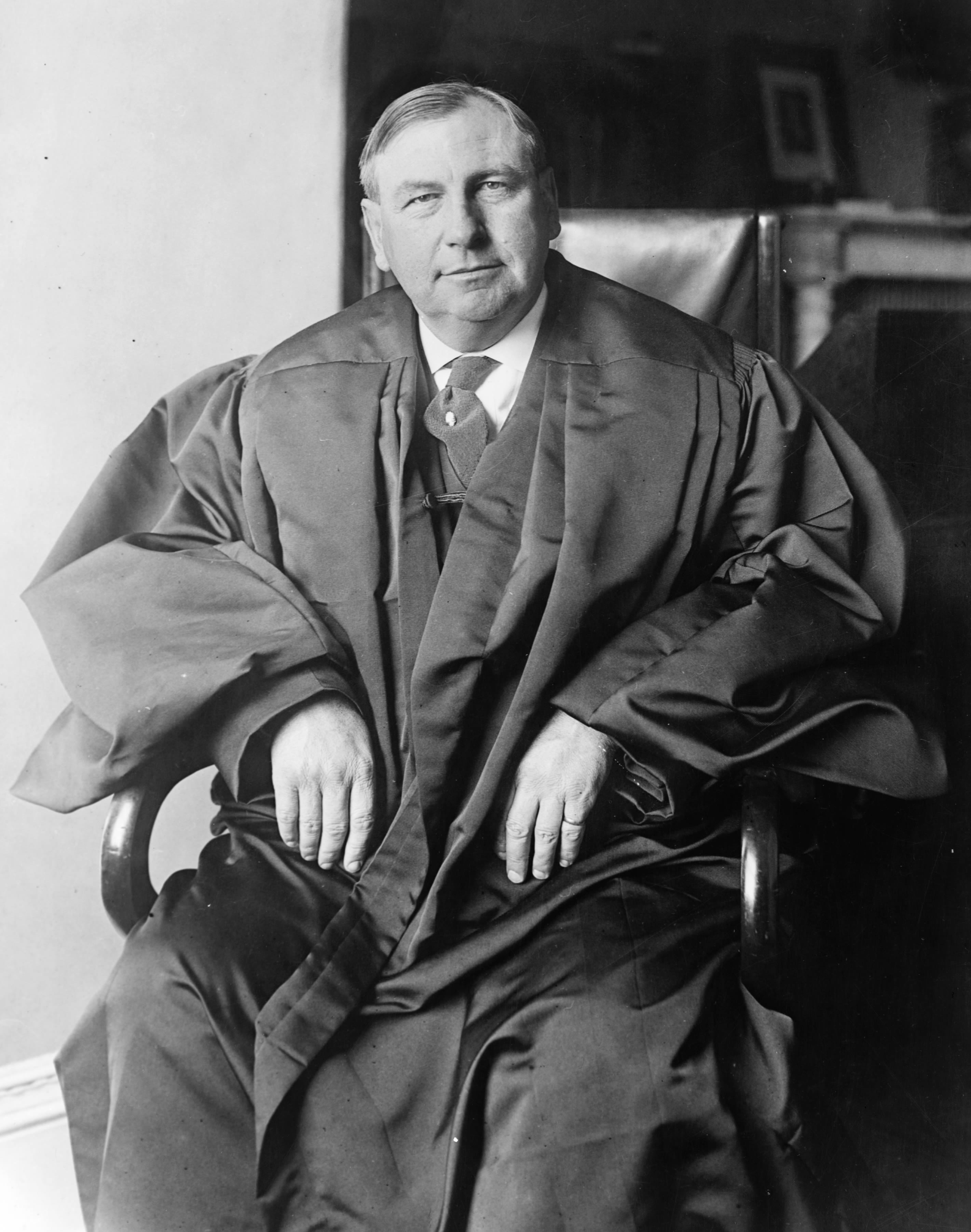
Chief Justice Harlan Fiske Stone circa 1925 to 1932.

During Boskey's clerkship for Chief Justice Stone, the Court decided Ex parte Quirin, 317 U.S. 1 (1942), a case that upheld the jurisdiction of a United States military tribunal during WW II over the trial of eight German saboteurs in the United States. Quirin has been cited as a precedent for the trial by military commission of any unlawful combatant against the United States.

Boskey played a pivotal role in shaping the case's reasoning. "Writing to Boskey about the Fifth and Sixth Amendments challenge..., Stone admitted that 'I think [my statement in the draft opinion] is right but my authorities are meager.'" With a creative flair, Boskey proposed to Stone the so-called "satisfactory alternative method" to give the Court the standing to review the Saboteurs Case.

== Legal career ==
After Army service in World War II, where Boskey achieved the rank of first lieutenant, he worked for several federal agencies. Boskey was special assistant to the Attorney General in the U.S. Department of Justice in 1943, and an adviser on enemy property in the U.S. Department of State from 1946 to 1947, in an office led by economist John Kenneth Galbraith. Boskey was an attorney for the Atomic Energy Commission ("AEC") from 1947 to 1949; he served as deputy general counsel for the AEC from 1949 to 1951, where he worked under agency counsel, Joseph Volpe Jr. (October 18, 1913 – January 26, 2002).

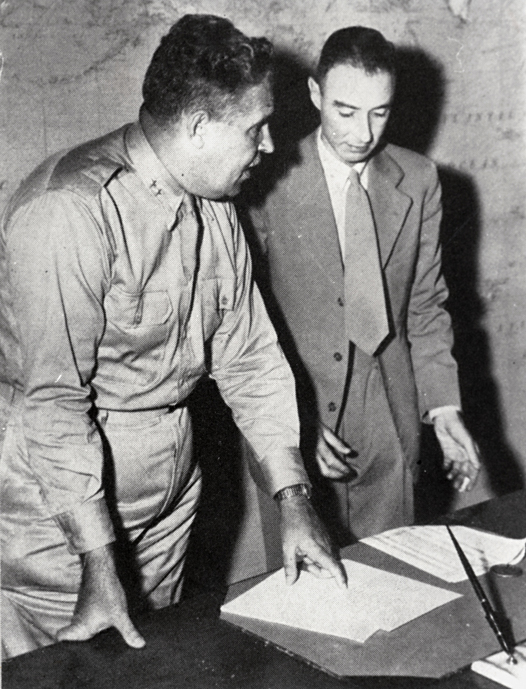
General Leslie Groves (left), military head of the Manhattan Project, with Professor Robert Oppenheimer (right).

From 1951 to 1996, Boskey was a partner in the firm that became Volpe, Boskey and Lyons. During WW II, Volpe had assisted Gen. Leslie Groves (August 17, 1896 – July 13, 1970) in negotiations to "secure uranium and other material from Great Britain." In 1954, physicist J. Robert Oppenheimer (April 22, 1904 – February 18, 1967) asked Volpe to represent him against charges of treason. The U.S. Government had bugged Volpe's law office and secretly recorded the conversations.

At the firm, Boskey represented non-profit organizations, individuals in probate cases, and companies in matters of nuclear energy licensing. On December 12, 1961, Boskey argued Coppedge v. United States before the U.S. Supreme Court, winning a 5–2 majority for his in forma pauperis client appealing a criminal conviction. In 1973, Boskey helped Columbia University defend its license to operate a nuclear reactor on campus for research purposes, though it was never used. When the firm dissolved in 1996, Boskey maintained a solo practice for an additional nineteen years.

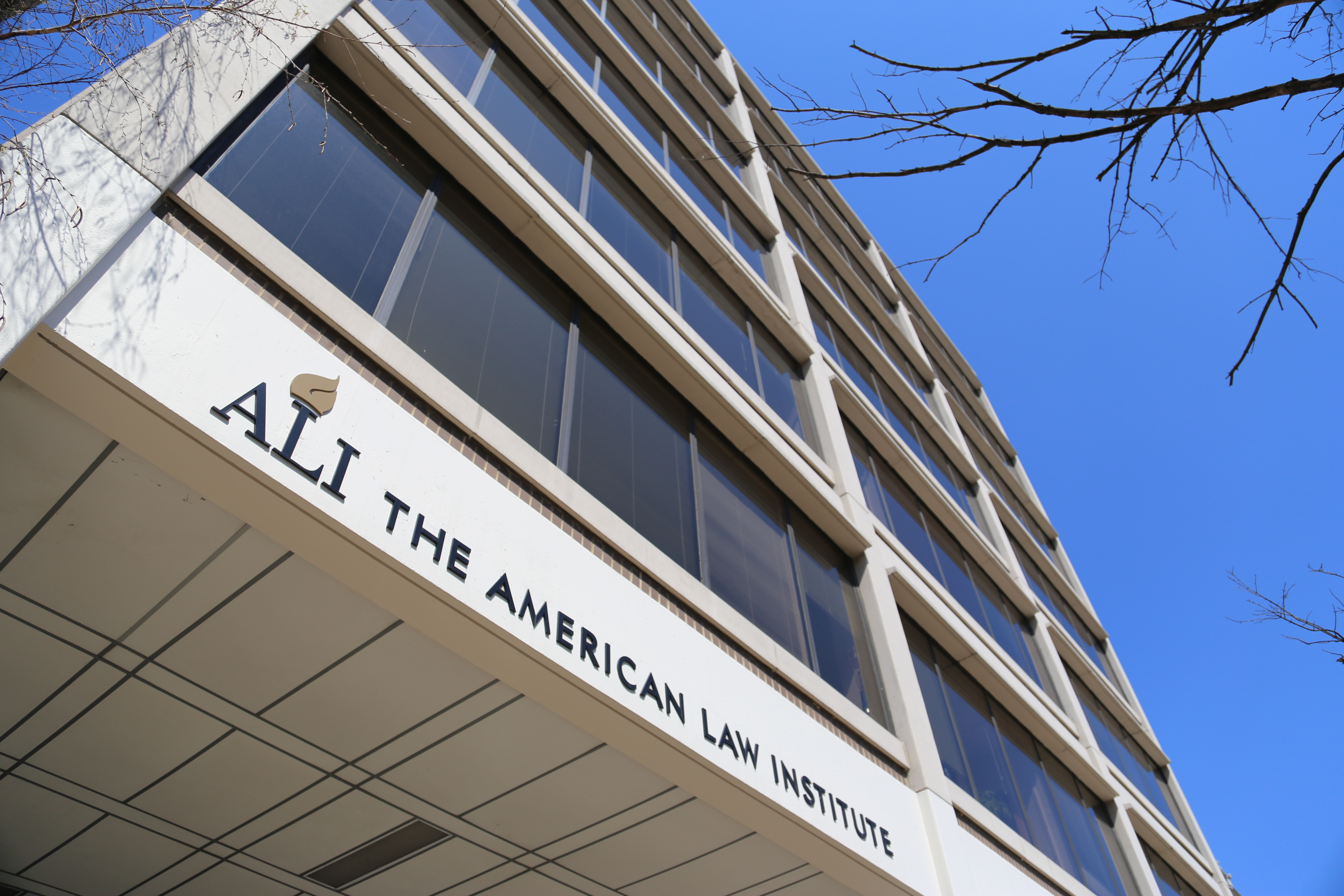
ALI headquarters, Philadelphia, Pennsylvania.

Following the model set by Judge Hand, Boskey devoted substantial effort to law reform. Judge Hand was an early member of the American Law Institute ("ALI"), and had chaired the committee that established ALI's method of involving a mix of private practitioners, law professors and judges to publish recommendations. As with Hand, Boskey believed law should adapt to changes in society. The ALI's recommended reforms and publishing Restatements of law furthered that goal. From 1975 to 2010, Boskey was treasurer of ALI. Since at least 1971, his so-called "Boskey motion", precisely capturing a draft's procedural status, has preceded its approval at the ALI Annual Meeting.

In 1975, during the administration of President Gerald Ford, Boskey was on the short list of possible nominations to the Supreme Court.

The position of the Bennett Boskey Professor of Law at Harvard Law School was first held by Lani Guinier. There is also a Bennett Boskey fellowship in Extra-European History since 1500 endowed by legacy at Exeter College, Oxford and Williams College.

Boskey was a member of the New York bar for more than seventy-five years (making him among the top five longest tenured members), and the Washington, D.C., bar for sixty-seven.

== See also ==
- List of law clerks for the chief justice of the United States
- List of law clerks for the sixth seat of the Supreme Court of the United States

== Sources ==
- Alumni Notes, "Profile – Bennet Boskey ’39: Not Shy, Not Retiring," Harvard Law Bulletin, Fall 2000.
- Barnes, Bart, "Bennet Boskey, Washington lawyer, dies at 99," Washington Post, June 1, 2016.
- Davies, Ross E. (June 13, 2016). "Some Clerical Contributions to Ex Parte Quirin," SSRN.
- "In Memoriam: Bennett Boskey" (May 2016). American Law Institute.
- "Interview with Bennett Boskey" (March 18, 1981). Louie B. Nunn Center for Oral History, University of Kentucky Libraries, Edward Gilson, Interviewer.
- "Interview with Bennett Boskey" (July 5, 2005). Williams College Oral History Project.
- O'Brien, David M. (1989). "Filling Justice William O. Douglas's Seat: President Gerald R. Ford's Appointment to Justice John Paul Stevens," 1989 SCOTUS Historical Society Yearbook 20.
- Peppers, Todd C. (2012). In Chambers: Stories of Supreme Court Law Clerks and Their Justices. Charlottesville, VA: University of Virginia. ISBN 081393401X; ISBN 978-0813934013.
- Wiecek, William M. (2006). The History of the Supreme Court of the United States. New York, NY: Cambridge University Press. ISBN 0-521-84820-2.

== Selected writings ==
- Boskey, Bennett, "A Justice's Papers: Chief Justice's Stone's Biographer and the Saboteur's Case," 14 Sup. Ct. H. Soc. Q. 10 (1993).
- ----, "Antitrust Enforcement by the Atomic Energy Commission," 19 A.B.A. Antitrust Section 399 (1961).
- ----, "Appeals from State Courts under the Federal Judicial Code," 30 Virginia L. Rev. 57 (1943).
- ----, "Bob Jackson Remembered," 68 Albany L. Rev. 5–7 (2005).
- ----, "Book Review of 'Justice Brennan: Liberal Champion,'" 14 Green Bag 2d 343 (2010).
- ----, "Mr Chief Justice Stone," 59 Harv. L. Rev. 1200 (1946).
- ----, "Justice Reed and His Family of Law Clerks," 69 Kentucky L. Journal 869 (1980–81).
- ----, "Inventions and the Atom," 50 Colum. L. Rev. 433 (1950).
- ----, "Mechanics of the Supreme Court's Certiorari Jurisdiction," 46 Colum. L. Rev. 255 (1946).
- ----, "Patent licensing problems in international atomic energy development." Address for delivery before Atomic Industrial Forum, Inc. Symposium on international problems of the atomic industry, April 25, 1957, Plaza Hotel, New York City.
- ---- (2007). Some Joys of Lawyering: Selected Writings 1946–2007. Washington, D.C.: Green Bag Press. ISBN 193365807X, ISBN 978-1933658070.
- ----, "Some Patent Aspects of Atomic Power Development," 21 Law and Contemporary Problems 113–131 (Winter 1956).
- ----, "Supreme Court Declinations," 31(3) Journal of Supreme Court History 252 (2006)(paid link).
- ---- (1967–1998, 5 eds.) Supreme Court Forms and Procedure. St. Paul, MN: West Publishing.
- ---- (1990). The Supreme Court's New Rules for the Nineties. St. Paul, MN: West Publishing.
- ---- & Roland A. Anderson, "Free Licenses to AEC Inventions," 33 J. Pat. Off. Soc'y 323 (1951).
- ---- & Robert Braucher, "Jurisdiction and Collateral Attack: October Term, 1939," 40 Colum. L. Rev. 1006 (1940).
- ---- & Eugene Gressman (1980). The Supreme Court's New Rules for the Eighties. St. Paul, MN: West Publishing.
- ---- & Eugene Gressman, "The Supreme Court Bids Farewell to Mandatory Appeals," 121 F.R.D. 81, 85–86 (1988).
- ---- & John H. Pickering, "Federal Restrictions on State Criminal Procedure," 13 U. Chi. L. Rev. 266 (1946).
- ---- & Mason Willrich, eds. (1970). Nuclear Proliferation: Prospects for Control. New York, NY: Dunellen. ISBN 0-8424-0011-7.
