= Evelyn Station =

Evelyn Station may refer to:

- Evelyn station, a former light rail station in Mountain View, California, United States
- Teal Inlet, once named Evelyn Station, a settlement in the Falkland Islands
