= Saint Kateri Tekakwitha National Shrine & Historic Site =

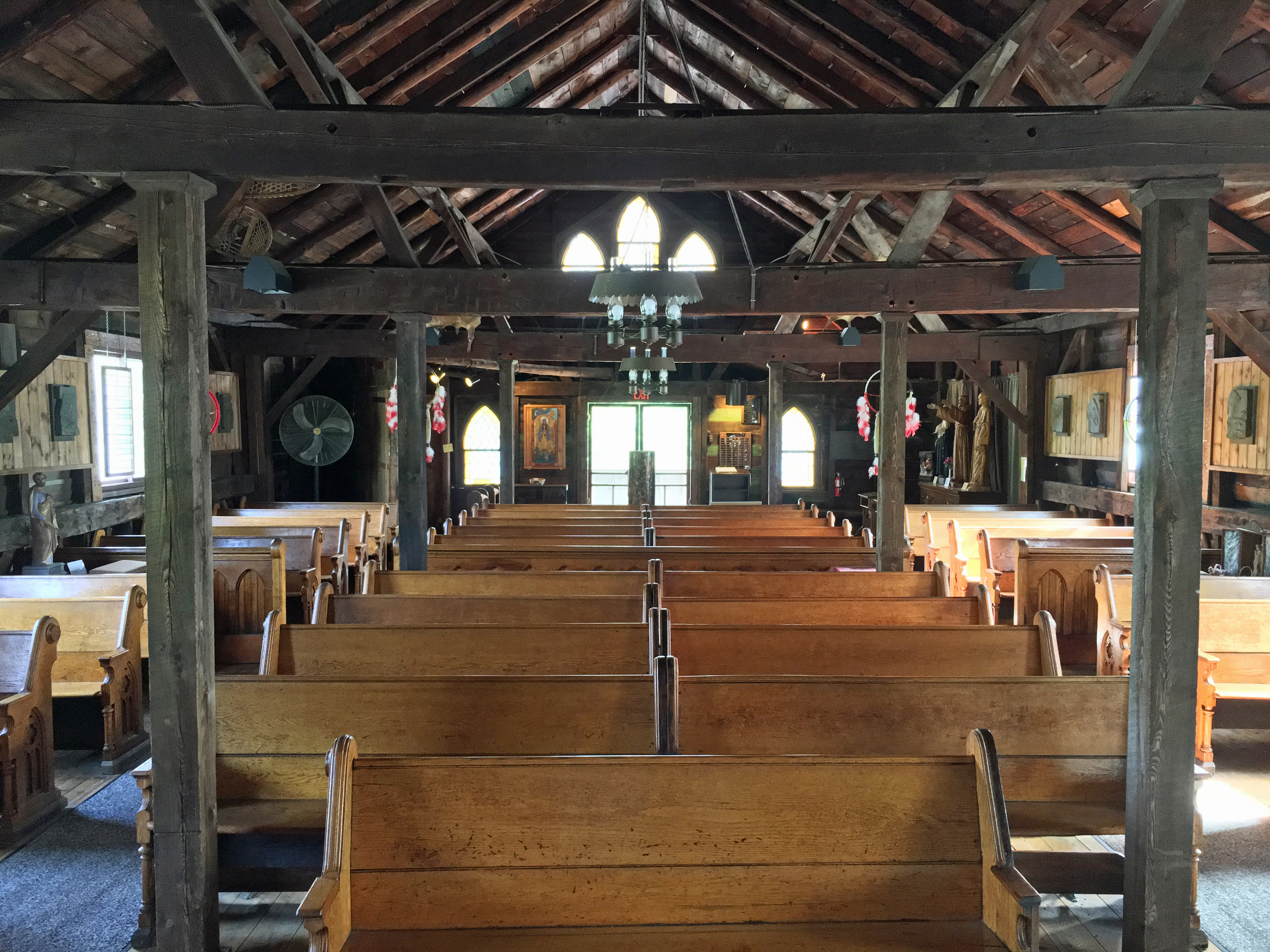
- Saint Peter Chapel at the Saint Kateri Tekakwitha National Shrine & Historic Site, viewed from the altar.
- Saint Kateri Tekakwitha National Shrine & Historic Site
- 42.9501°N 74.3927°W
- Address: 3636 NY Route 5, Fonda, NY 12068
- Country: United States
- Denomination: Catholic
- Website: katerishrine.org

History
- Status: National Shrine
- Founded: 1938
- Founder: Rev. Thomas Grassmann, OFM Conv.
- Dedication: Kateri Tekakwitha

Architecture
- Architect: Simon Veeder
- Style: Colonial

The Saint Kateri Tekakwitha National Shrine & Historic Site is a Roman Catholic shrine in Fonda, New York dedicated to Kateri Tekakwitha, the first Native North American saint canonized in the Catholic Church.

While it is physically located within the Roman Catholic Diocese of Albany, it is a ministry of the Order of Friars Minor Conventual The site was established as a memorial in 1938 and as a shrine in 1980. The Shrine grounds are also home to the Caughnawaga Indian Village Site, an archaeological site on the National Register of Historic Places.

== History ==
In 1938 Father Thomas Grassmann founded the Fonda Memorial of Catherine Tekakwitha near Fonda, New York. The site was chosen based on local history showing that Fonda was in the vicinity of the Mohawk settlement Caughnawaga, where Catholic convert Kateri (Catherine) Tekakwitha had lived part of her life (1656–1680) and been baptized. The Order of Friars Minor Conventual took over the site on the request of Edmund Gibbons, Bishop of Albany from 1919 to 1954. After preliminary exploration by members of the New York State Archaeological Association in the 1940s, Grassmann identified post molds of a stockade line, pinpointing the location of the Caughnawaga settlement. From 1950 to 1956, Grassmann led the thorough exploration of the site of Caughnawaga. Excavation revealed a fortified, gated wooden double stockade, called a "castle," and 12 long houses, inhabited by the Mohawk people between 1666 and 1693. Grassmann developed the Fonda memorial and its on-site Mohawk Caughnawaga Indian Museum (now the Caughnawaga-Veeder Museum) until his death in 1970. Grassmann was honored by burial on the site he excavated. The Caughnawaga Castle Site was listed on the National Register of Historic Places in 1973, while Father Ronald Schultz served as director of the memorial and the museum.

== Shrine ==
The Shrine is about 0.25 miles (0.40 km) west of Fonda, New York, on the north bank of the Mohawk River. In the late nineteenth and early twentieth centuries, research conducted locally identified the area as that in which Kateri Tekakwitha had lived from early childhood until her relocation to Canada in the last years of her life. The land had been the property of the Anglo-Dutch Veeder family and the farmstead of Simon Veeder (1748–1836), who built a large farmhouse and agricultural buildings on the site in 1782. The Shrine's Saint Peter Chapel and Caughnawaga-Veeder Museum are housed in Simon Veeder's 1782 barn; his house serves as the friary and an occasional event space. The Museum hosts permanent exhibits of Native American art and antiquities. Other, more recently constructed buildings include Grassmann Hall; the Saint Maximilian Kolbe Pavilion, where Conventual friars say Mass; and the Candle Chapel, a small structure with votive candles and space for prayer that is open to pilgrims year-round. The Shrine's 130-acre grounds include a network of hiking trails passing through woodland and meadow landscapes, as well as the Kateri Spring, which provided the water for Kateri Tekakwitha's baptism.
