= Cressman =

Cressman is a surname, the Americanized form of the German surname Kressmann, which is itself a variant of Kress. Notable people with the surname include:

- Beverley Cressman, British actress
- Dave Cressman (born 1950), retired Canadian ice hockey left winger
- Derek Cressman (born 1967), American politician, activist and author
- George P. Cressman (1919–2008), American meteorologist and National Weather Service director (1965–1979)
- Glen Cressman (1934–2019), retired Canadian professional ice hockey forward
- Joseph Cressman Thompson or Joseph Cheesman Thompson, M. D., (1874–1943), career medical officer in the United States Navy
- Luther Cressman (1897–1994), American anthropologist
- Natalie Cressman, American musician
- Tom Cressman (1960–2000), British stockbroker, murdered by his girlfriend Jane Andrews, a one-time Royal dresser for Sarah, the Duchess of York

== See also ==
- Chriesman
- Crosman
- Crossman (disambiguation)
- Gressmann
