= Walter Butler Homestead =

Historic house in New York, United States

- U.S. National Register of Historic Places
- Location within New York Location within the United States
- Nearest city: NE of Fonda on Old Trail Rd. near Fonda, New York
- Coordinates: 42°57′43″N 74°21′17″W
- Area: 2 acres (0.81 ha)
- Built: 1742
- Architect: Butler, Walter
- NRHP reference No.: 76001229
- Added to NRHP: June 23, 1976

Walter Butler Homestead, also known as Butlersbury, is a historic home located near Fonda in Montgomery County, New York. It is a 1 1/2-story, 40-foot-long, 30-foot-wide, 18th-century farmhouse. It has a limestone block foundation and cellar and attic. The dwelling was built by Lt. Walter Butler (ca. 1670–1760), father of John Butler (1728-1796).

It was added to the National Register of Historic Places in 1976.
