= Lockheed Martin Transit Center =

VTA light rail station in Sunnyvale, California

Lockheed Martin
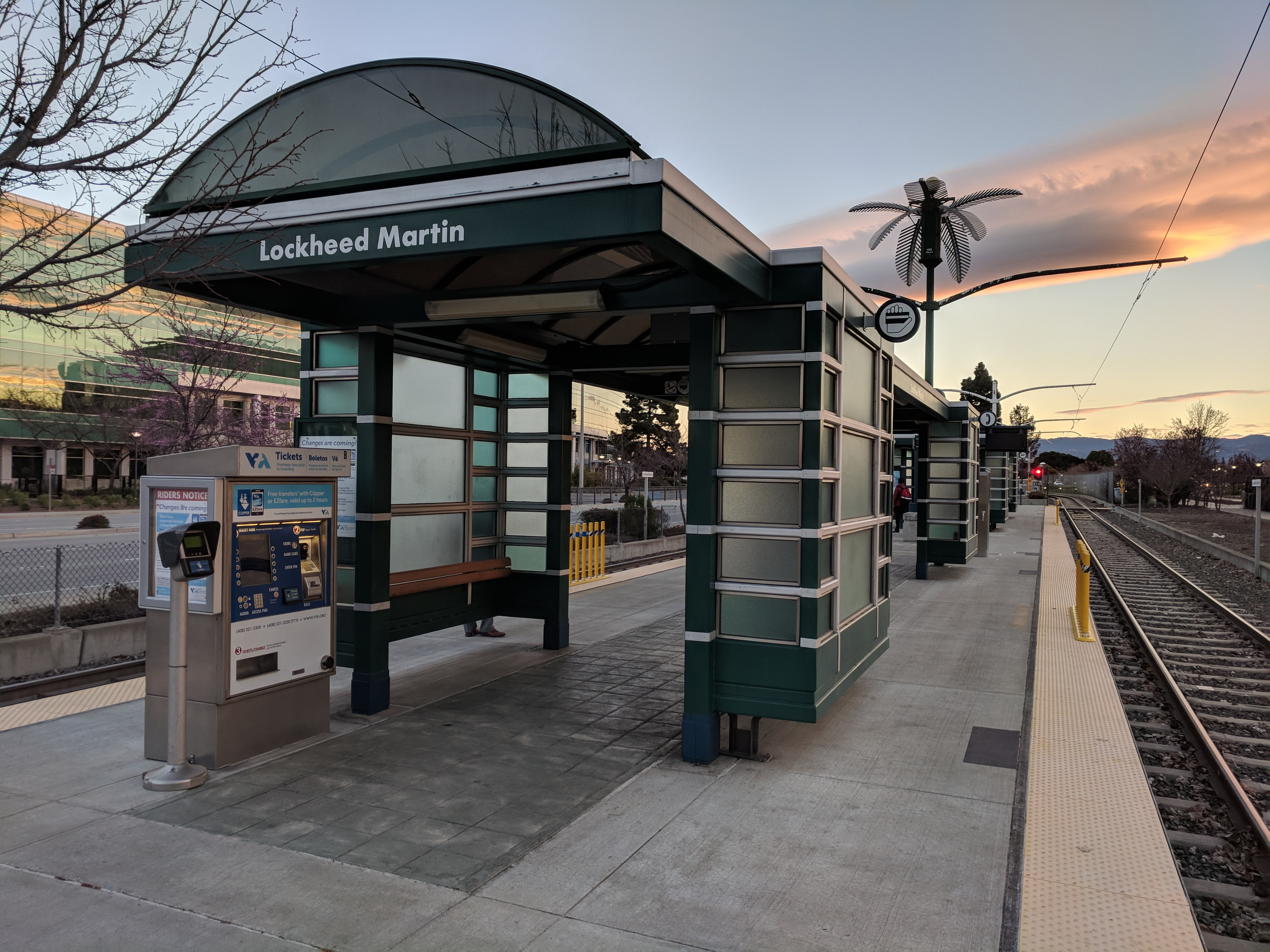
- The platform for VTA light rail at Lockheed Martin Transit Center

General information
- Other names: Lockheed Martin Transit Center
- Location: Mathilda Avenue and 5th Avenue; Sunnyvale, California
- Coordinates: 37°24′34″N 122°01′38″W
- Owner: Santa Clara Valley Transportation Authority
- Platforms: 1 island platform
- Tracks: 2
- Connections: VTA Bus: 56, Rapid 523; ACE Shuttle: Red

Construction
- Structure type: At-grade
- Accessible: Yes

History
- Opened: December 20, 1999; 26 years ago

Services
Preceding station	VTA	Following station
Moffett Park toward Mountain View	Orange Line	Borregas toward Alum Rock
Location

Lockheed Martin Transit Center (signed as simply Lockheed Martin station on many signs) is a light rail and transit bus station operated by Santa Clara Valley Transportation Authority (VTA), located near the intersection of Mathilda Avenue and 5th Avenue in Sunnyvale, California. This station is served by the Orange Line of the VTA light rail system.

The land for the transit center was donated by Lockheed Martin during the planning of VTA's Tasman West light rail extension, as it serves the nearby Lockheed Martin Space Systems complex.

== Service ==
=== Location ===
The station has an island platform. It is located at 5th Avenue and North Mathilda Avenue in Sunnyvale, California. It serves the Lockheed Martin Space Systems complex, the east side of Moffett Federal Airfield and the adjacent industrial area including the headquarters of Yahoo and Juniper Networks.
