= Bayshore/NASA station =

VTA light rail station in Mountain View, California

Bayshore/NASA
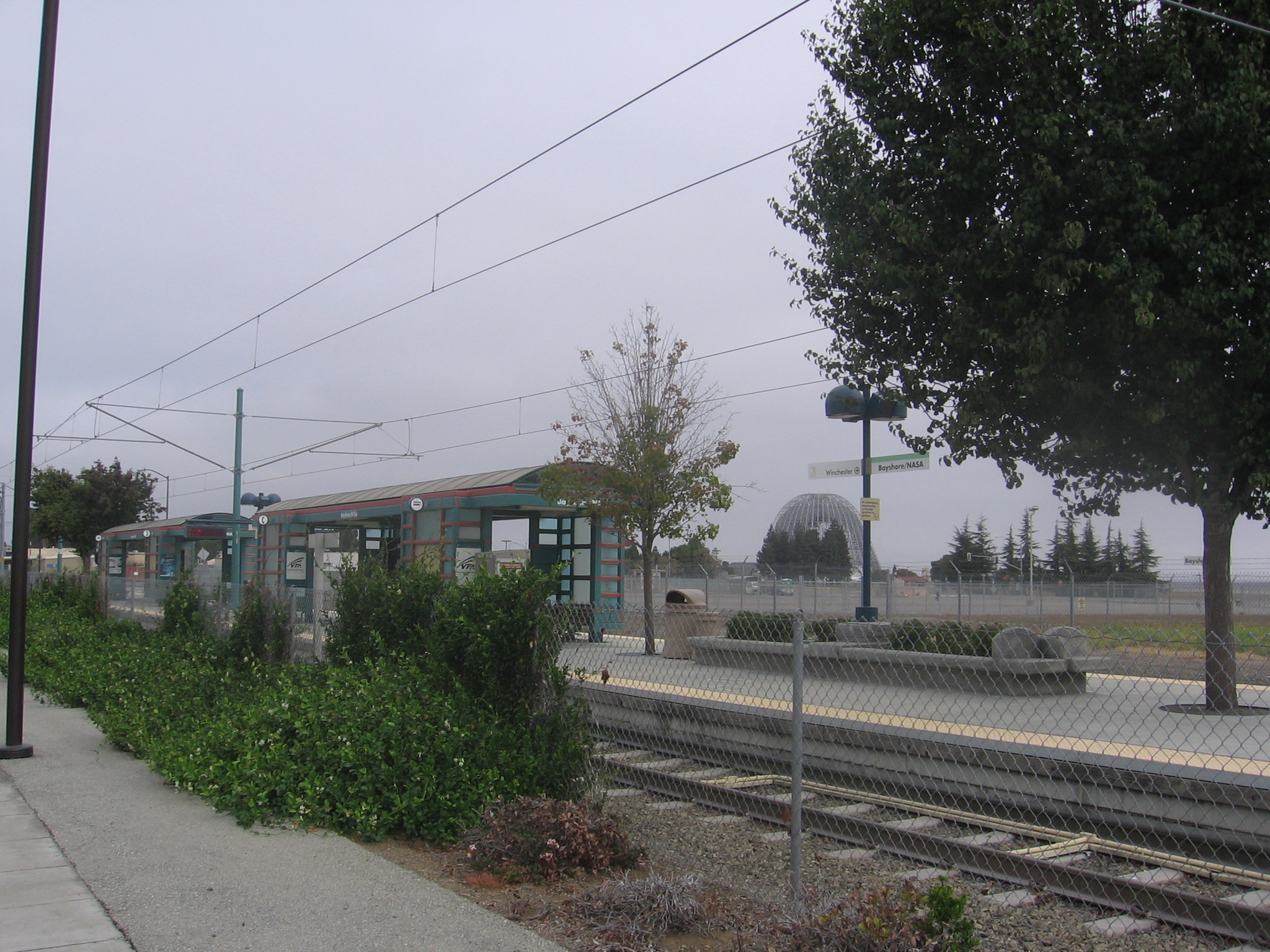
- Bayshore/NASA station with remains of Hangar One in background, September 2012

General information
- Location: Manila Drive and Ellis Street; Mountain View, California
- Coordinates: 37°24′17″N 122°02′59″W
- Owner: Santa Clara Valley Transportation Authority
- Platforms: 1 island platform
- Tracks: 2

Construction
- Structure type: At-grade
- Cycle facilities: Lockers
- Accessible: Yes

History
- Opened: December 20, 1999

Services
Preceding station	VTA	Following station
Middlefield toward Mountain View	Orange Line	Moffett Park toward Alum Rock
Location

Bayshore/NASA station is a light rail station operated by Santa Clara Valley Transportation Authority (VTA) in Mountain View, California. It is located on Manila Drive at the Ellis Street entrance to the NASA Ames Research Center and Moffett Federal Airfield. The station is just north of the Bayshore Freeway/Ellis Street interchange. The station is served by the Orange Line of the VTA light rail system.
