= Fair Oaks station =

VTA light rail station in Sunnyvale, California

Fair Oaks
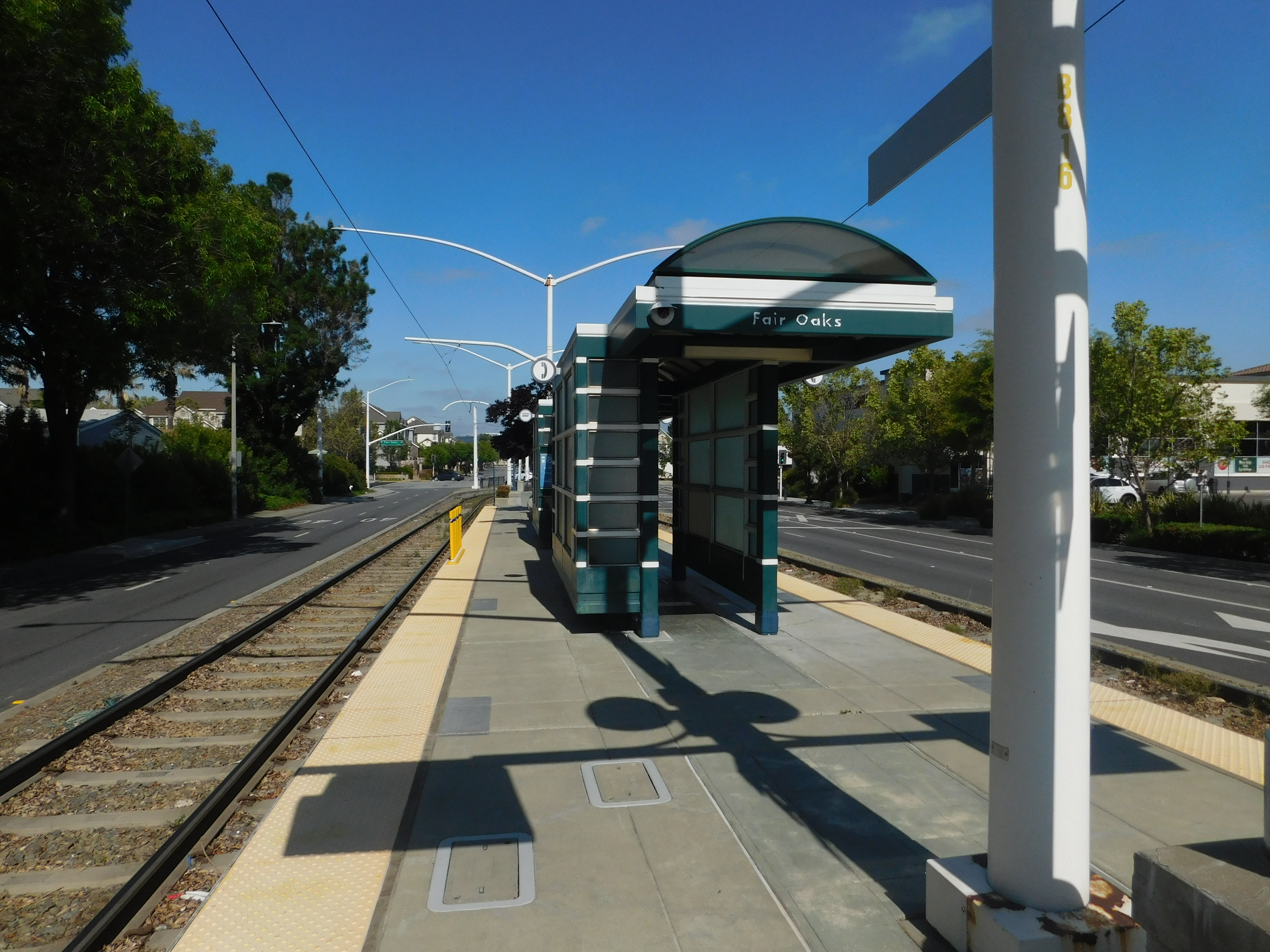
- Fair Oaks station platform in May 2023.

General information
- Location: Tasman Drive and Fair Oaks Avenue; Sunnyvale, California
- Coordinates: 37°24′10″N 122°00′33″W
- Owner: Santa Clara Valley Transportation Authority
- Platforms: 1 island platform
- Tracks: 2
- Connections: VTA Bus: 56

Construction
- Structure type: At-grade
- Accessible: Yes

History
- Opened: December 20, 1999; 26 years ago

Services
Preceding station	VTA	Following station
Crossman toward Mountain View	Orange Line	Vienna toward Alum Rock
Location

Fair Oaks station is a light rail station operated by Santa Clara Valley Transportation Authority (VTA), located near the intersection of Tasman Drive and Fair Oaks Avenue in Sunnyvale, California. This station is served by the Orange Line of the VTA light rail system.
