= Moffett Park station =

VTA light rail station in Sunnyvale, California

Moffett Park
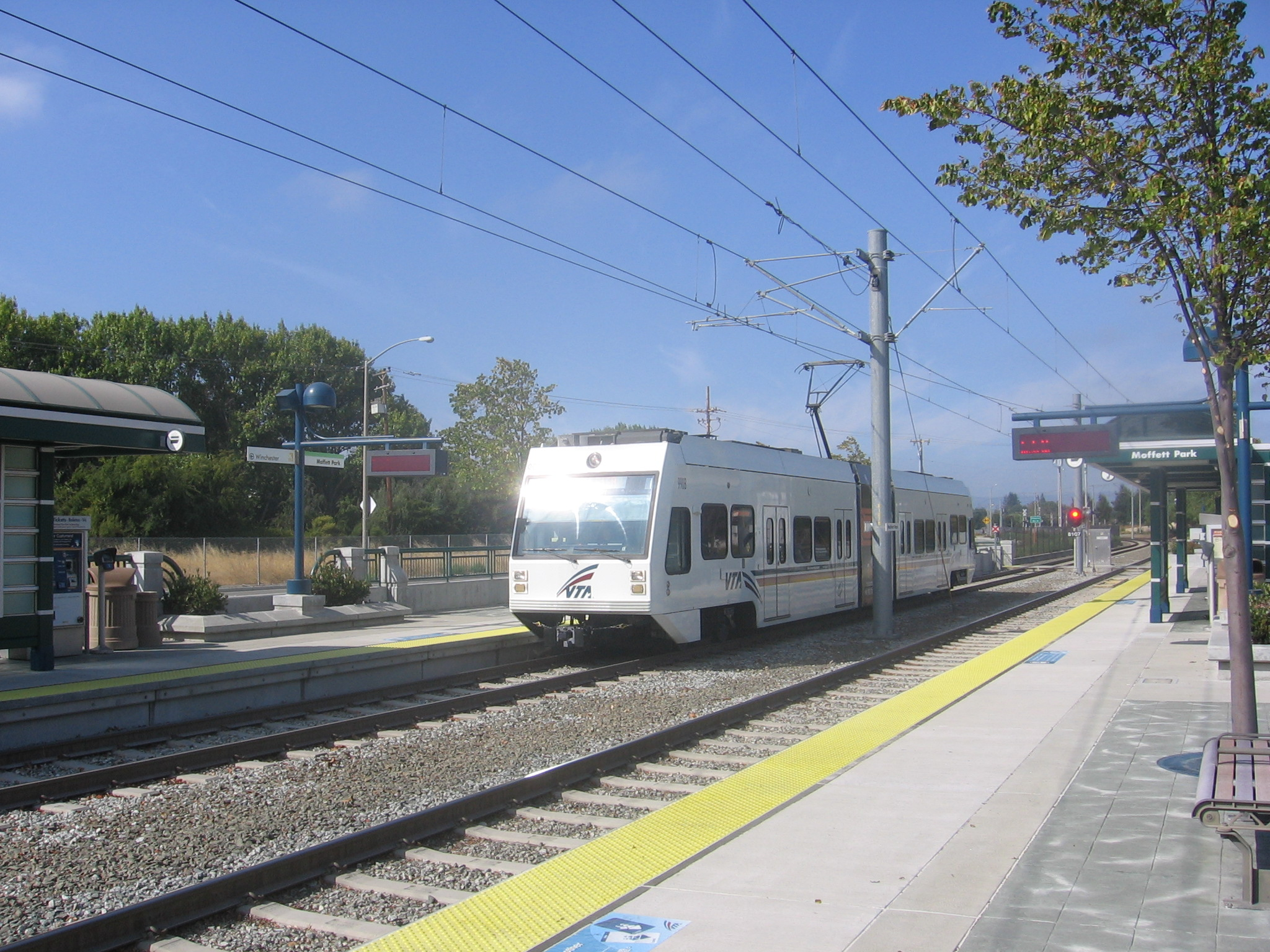
- Moffett Park station platform, September 2012

General information
- Location: Moffett Park Drive and H Street; Sunnyvale, California
- Coordinates: 37°24′09″N 122°02′00″W
- Owner: Santa Clara Valley Transportation Authority
- Platforms: 2 side platforms
- Tracks: 2

Construction
- Structure type: At-grade
- Parking: 93 spaces
- Cycle facilities: Lockers
- Accessible: Yes

History
- Opened: December 20, 1999; 26 years ago

Services
Preceding station	VTA	Following station
Bayshore/NASA toward Mountain View	Orange Line	Lockheed Martin toward Alum Rock
Location

Moffett Park station is a light rail station operated by Santa Clara Valley Transportation Authority (VTA), located in Sunnyvale, California. Moffett Park was built as an infill station. This station is served by the Orange Line of the VTA light rail system. Technology Corners at Moffett Park, an office building occupied by Google, is located adjacent to Moffett Park station. The station has 93 parking bays located on the north side of the tracks within the Google complex, entry off of 11th Ave.

== Service ==
=== Location ===
The station has split platforms north of Moffett Park Drive and east of Enterprise Way (formerly H Street) in Sunnyvale, California.
