= Tāmaki College =

Coordinates: 36.8776°S 174.8674°E

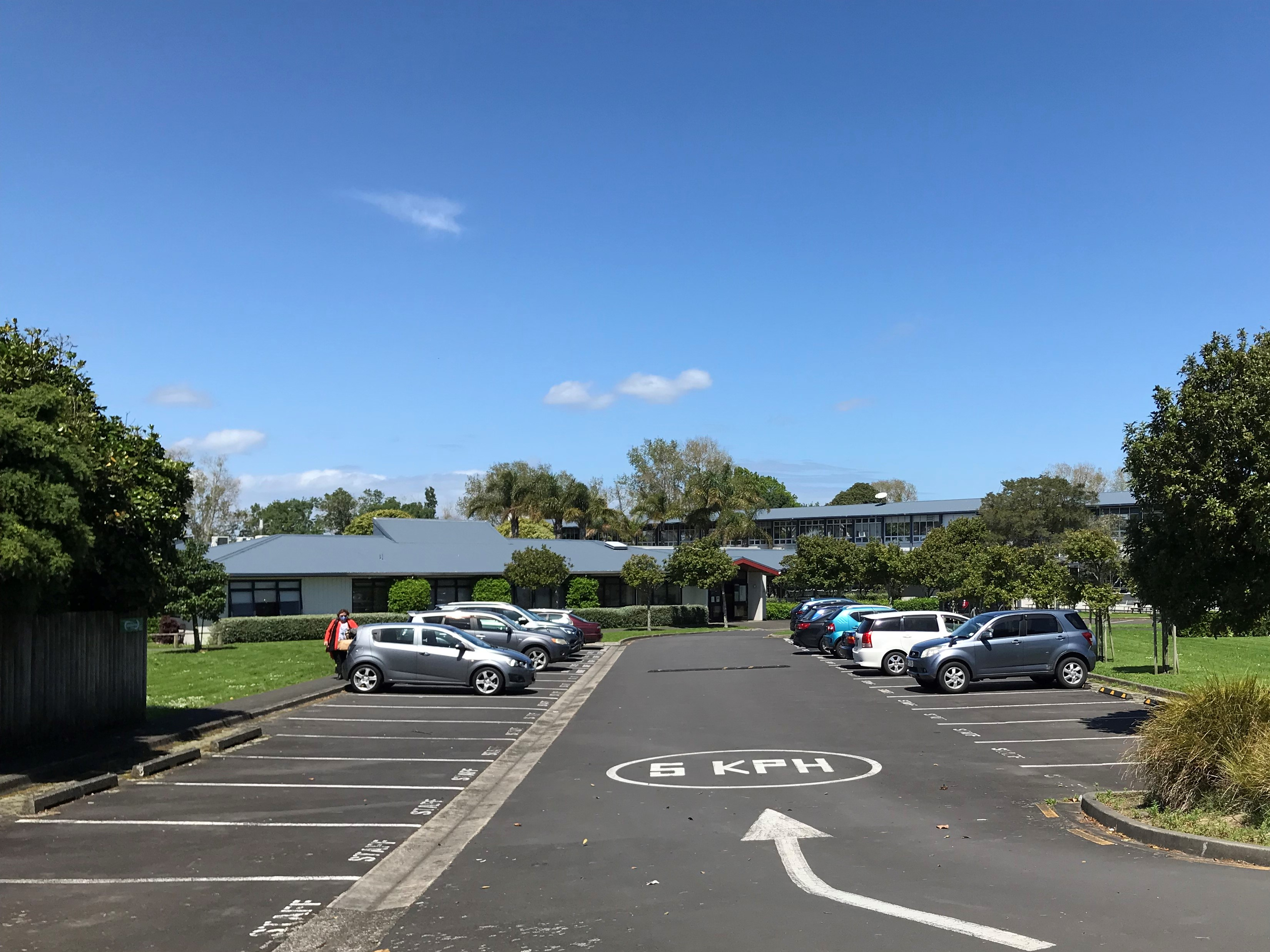

Information
- School type: State Co-educational Secondary, years 9-13
- Motto: Fortiter in Re
- Established: 1955
- Ministry of Education Institution no.: 57
- Principal: Soana Pamaka
- Enrolment: 720 (July 2026)
- Socio-economic decile: 1A
- Website: http://www.tamaki.ac.nz

Tāmaki College is co-educational Secondary School in Glen Innes, Auckland, New Zealand.

Originally constructed on two sites, it was planned to create a separate boys and girls colleges when the roll reached 1400. The separate sites in Glen Innes saw the establishment of the 'girls' school in 1955 with the last site in 1957.

This did not occur and the school remained on two sites until 1987.

In 2003 the 'girls' school was closed after a fire burned much of the building.

Tāmaki College serves the communities of Glen Innes and Panmure; it celebrated its Diamond Jubilee in 2017.

Since 1998 there has been an extensive redevelopment within the school including the recreation centre, technological block and library.

Tāmaki College is part of the "Trades Academies" initiative of the New Zealand Ministry of Education.

Tāmaki College is part of the "Services Academies" initiative of the New Zealand Ministry of Education.

== Enrolment ==
Tāmaki College is a member of the International Students Code.

At a 2017 Education Review Office review, Tāmaki College had 631 students included two international students. At the same review the following data shows the ethnic make up of the school.

Gender composition	Boys 50% Girls 50%	
Ethnic composition	Māori Pākehā Tongan Samoan Cook Islands Māori Niue other	33% 1% 32% 15% 10% 5% 4%

== Houses ==
Tāmaki College's house names & their colours
Kōwhai	Named for the New Zealand native plant Kōwhai
Pūriri	Named for the New Zealand native plant Pūriri
Rātā	Named for the New Zealand native plant Rātā
Tōtara	Named for the New Zealand native plant Tōtara

Each of the houses has a male and female House Captain and Deputy House Captains.

== Traditions ==
The heart of the school life is centred around the schools Marae complex, Te Poho o Tāmaki. All students and staff starting their journey at Tāmaki College goes through the tradition of being welcomed into the school through powhiri.

== Principals ==
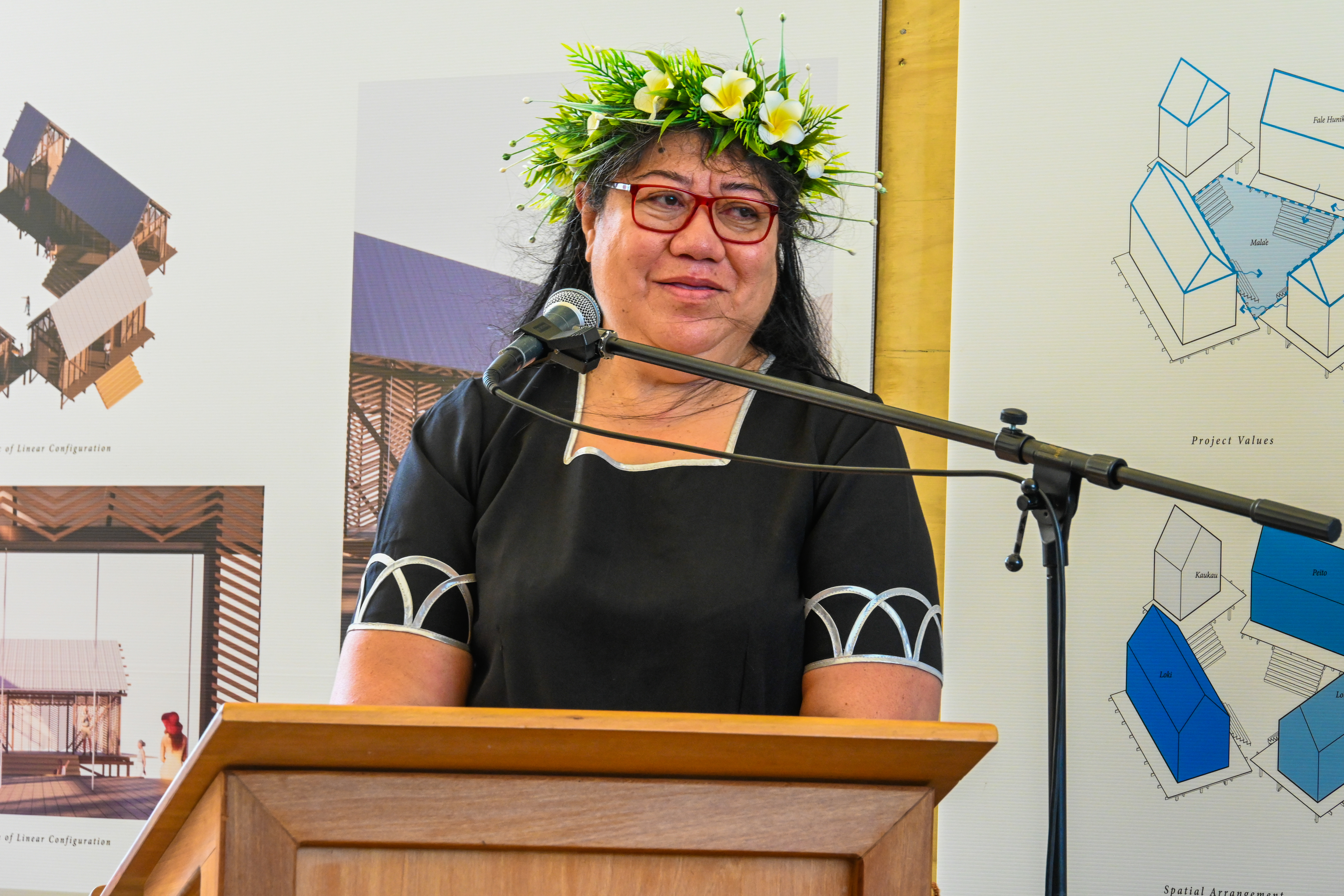
Soana Pamaka in 2022

	Name	Term
1	J. D. Murdoch	1957–1966
2	C. B. Floyd	1966–1973
3	E. R. Perry	1973–1986
4	J. A. Grant	1987–1998
5	David Hodge	1999–2005
6	Soana Pamaka	2006–present

== Notable alumni ==
=== Academia ===
- Alvina Pau’uvale – researcher and scientist for the University of Auckland

=== Sport ===
- Graeme Crossmen – professional rugby union player in New Zealand touring with the All Blacks to South Africa in 1976
- Vaea Fifita – All Black
- Sean Hoppe – NRL player, Canberra Raiders, North Sydney Bears, Auckland Warriors and New Zealand Kiwis rep
- Eliesa Katoa – rugby league player for the Melbourne Storm
- George Moala – is a professional rugby union player in New Zealand, representing Auckland and The Blues
- Doris Taufateau – is a female rugby union player for New Zealand and Auckland and is a current staff member of the school
- Siosiua Halanukonuka – professional Tongan rugby union player, plays in the prop position for the France side Perpignan, and represents Tonga at international level
- Maiakawanakaulani Roos – female rugby union player for New Zealand and Auckland
- Michael Chee-Kam – NRL player Manly, South Sydney, Wests Tigers
