= Vienna station (VTA) =

VTA light rail station in Sunnyvale, California

Vienna
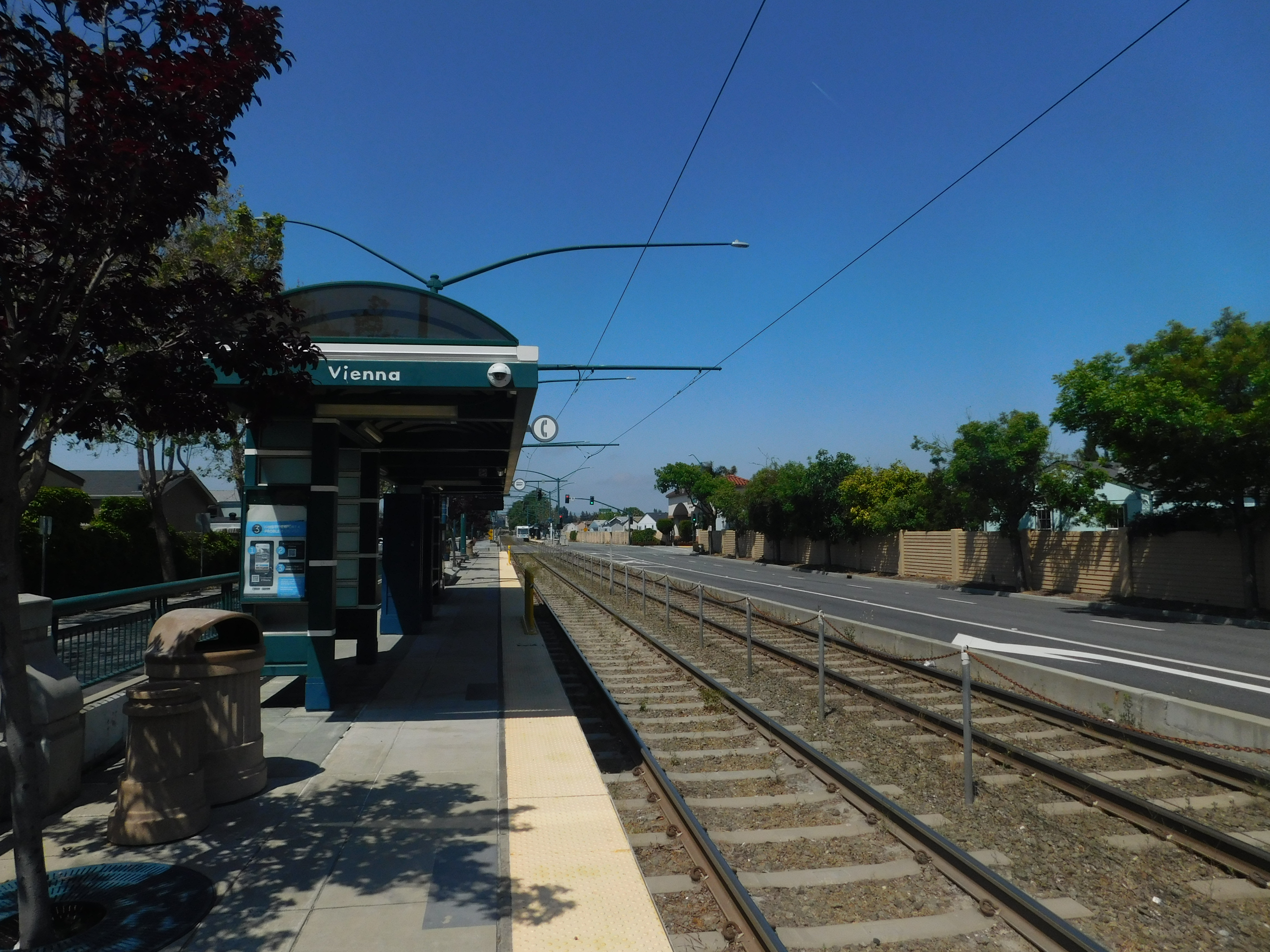
- Vienna station platform in May 2023.

General information
- Location: Tasman Drive and Vienna Drive; Sunnyvale, California
- Coordinates: 37°24′33″N 122°00′41″W
- Owner: Santa Clara Valley Transportation Authority
- Platforms: 2 side platforms
- Tracks: 2

Construction
- Structure type: At-grade
- Accessible: Yes

History
- Opened: December 20, 1999; 26 years ago

Services
Preceding station	VTA	Following station
Fair Oaks toward Mountain View	Orange Line	Reamwood toward Alum Rock
Location

Vienna station is a light rail station operated by Santa Clara Valley Transportation Authority (VTA) located near the intersection of Tasman Drive and Vienna Drive in Sunnyvale, California. This station is served by the Orange Line of the VTA light rail system. No bus connections are available at this location.
