= Whisman station =

VTA light rail station in Mountain View, California

Whisman
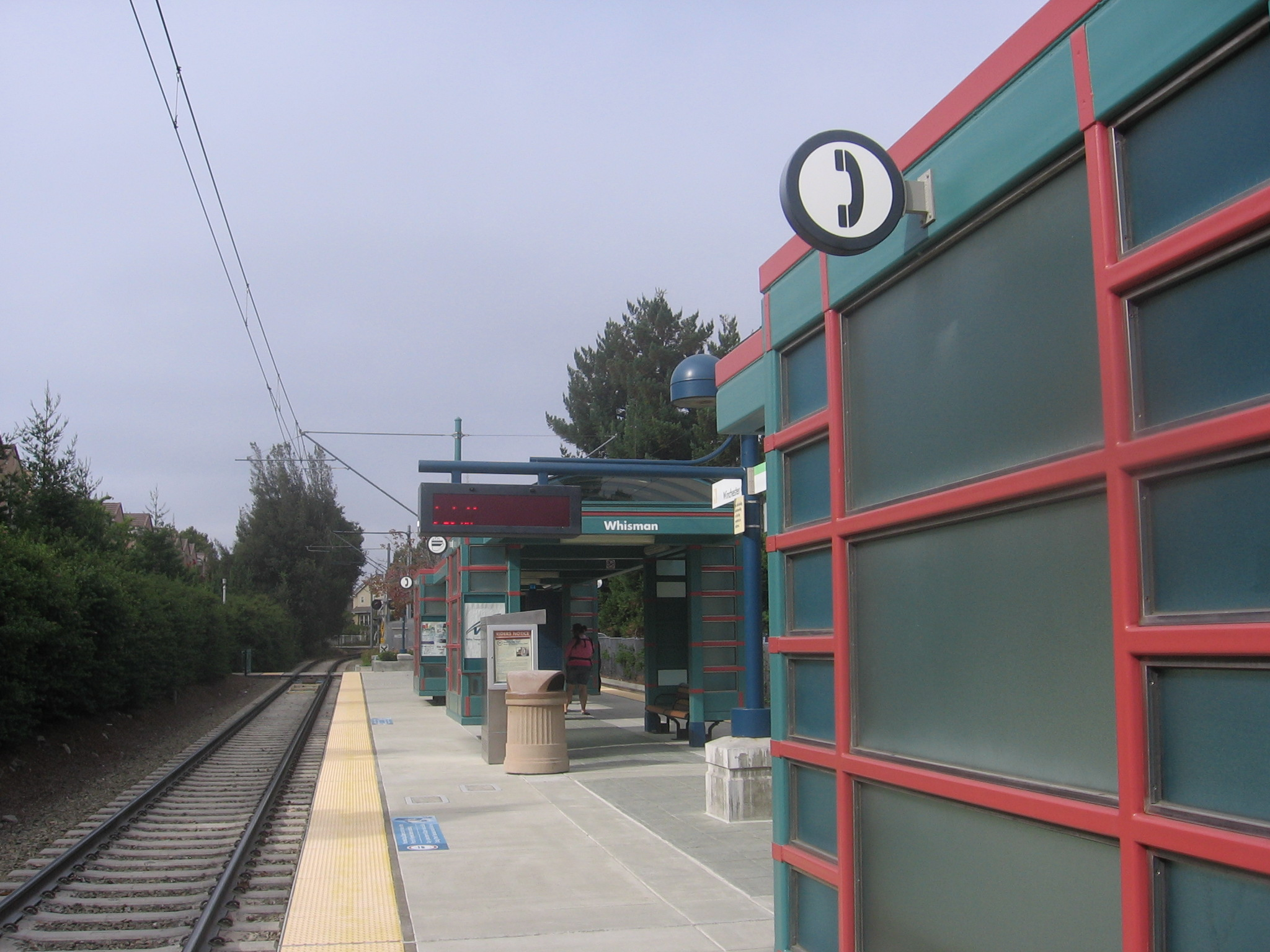
- Whisman station platform, September 2012

General information
- Location: 394 Whisman Station Drive; Mountain View, California
- Coordinates: 37°23′30″N 122°03′32″W
- Owner: VTA
- Platforms: 1 island platform
- Tracks: 2

Construction
- Structure type: At-grade
- Parking: 52 spaces
- Cycle facilities: Lockers
- Accessible: Yes

History
- Opened: December 20, 1999; 26 years ago

Services
| Preceding station | VTA | Following station |
|---|---|---|
| Mountain View Terminus | Orange Line | Middlefield toward Alum Rock |
Former services (1999–2015)
| Preceding station | VTA | Following station |
|---|---|---|
| Evelyn toward Mountain View | Orange Line | Middlefield toward Alum Rock |
Location

Whisman is a light rail station operated by Santa Clara Valley Transportation Authority (VTA), located in Mountain View, California. This station is served by the Orange Line of the VTA light rail system.

The station is surrounded by a residential area east of Whisman Drive that was built as transit-oriented development. There is no connecting bus transit at this station.
