= Thomas Grassmann =

Rev. Thomas Grassmann, OFM Conv, (born Frederick Francis Grassmann) (December 18, 1890 – October 1, 1970) was a Conventual Franciscan friar, historian and archaeologist of Colonial New York, who discovered the site of the Mohawk American Village of Caughnawaga near Fonda, New York.

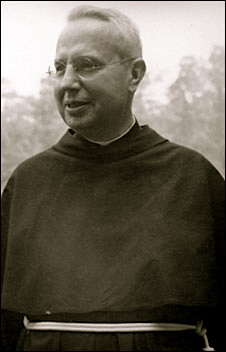
Rev. Thomas Grassmann, OFM Conv. (1890-1970), excavator of Caughnawaga.

== Biography ==
Born in Elizabeth NJ, he was the son of German immigrants Edward and Anna Hirt Grassmann. He was educated at St. John's Preparatory School at Fordham University, attended Seton Hall, and from 1916 to 1917, attended Syracuse University. He was professed in 1917, and then studied at the seminary of St. Anthony's on the Hudson in Rensselaer, NY, where he completed his theological training. He was ordained to the priesthood on August 22, 1920, by Bishop Edmund Gibbons.

In 1938 Father Grassmann founded the Fonda Memorial of Catherine Tekakwitha near Fonda, New York. This was in the vicinity of the Mohawk settlement Caughnawaga, where Catholic convert Kateri Tekakwitha had lived part of her life (1656-1680) and been baptized.

After preliminary exploration by members of the New York State Archaeological Association in the 1940s, Grassmann identified post molds of a stockade line, pinpointing the location, and led the thorough exploration of the site of Caughnawaga from 1950 to 1956. Excavation revealed a fortified, gated wooden double stockade, called a “castle,” and 12 long houses, covered with elm bark, inhabited by the Turtle Clan of the Mohawk from 1666 to 1693.

Grassmann's book The Mohawk Indians and their Valley: Being a Chronological Documentary Record to the End of 1693 (Schenectady, N.Y., Printed by Eric Hugo Photography and Print. Co., 1969) became a noted scholarly resource on the early history of the Mohawk Nation of Colonial New York.

The Caughnawaga Castle Site was declared a National Historical Place in 1973.

The Fonda memorial, after the beatification of Kateri by the Catholic Church in 1980, is now the Saint Kateri Tekakwitha National Shrine & Historic Site, whose museum houses the Mohawk Caughnawaga Collection assembled by Grassmann.

Caughnawaga remains the only completely excavated Iroquois village in North America. Grassmann was honored by burial on the site he excavated.

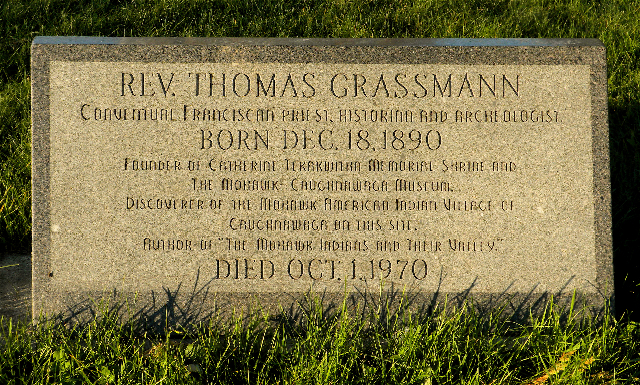
Grassmann's grave marker on the Caughnawaga site.

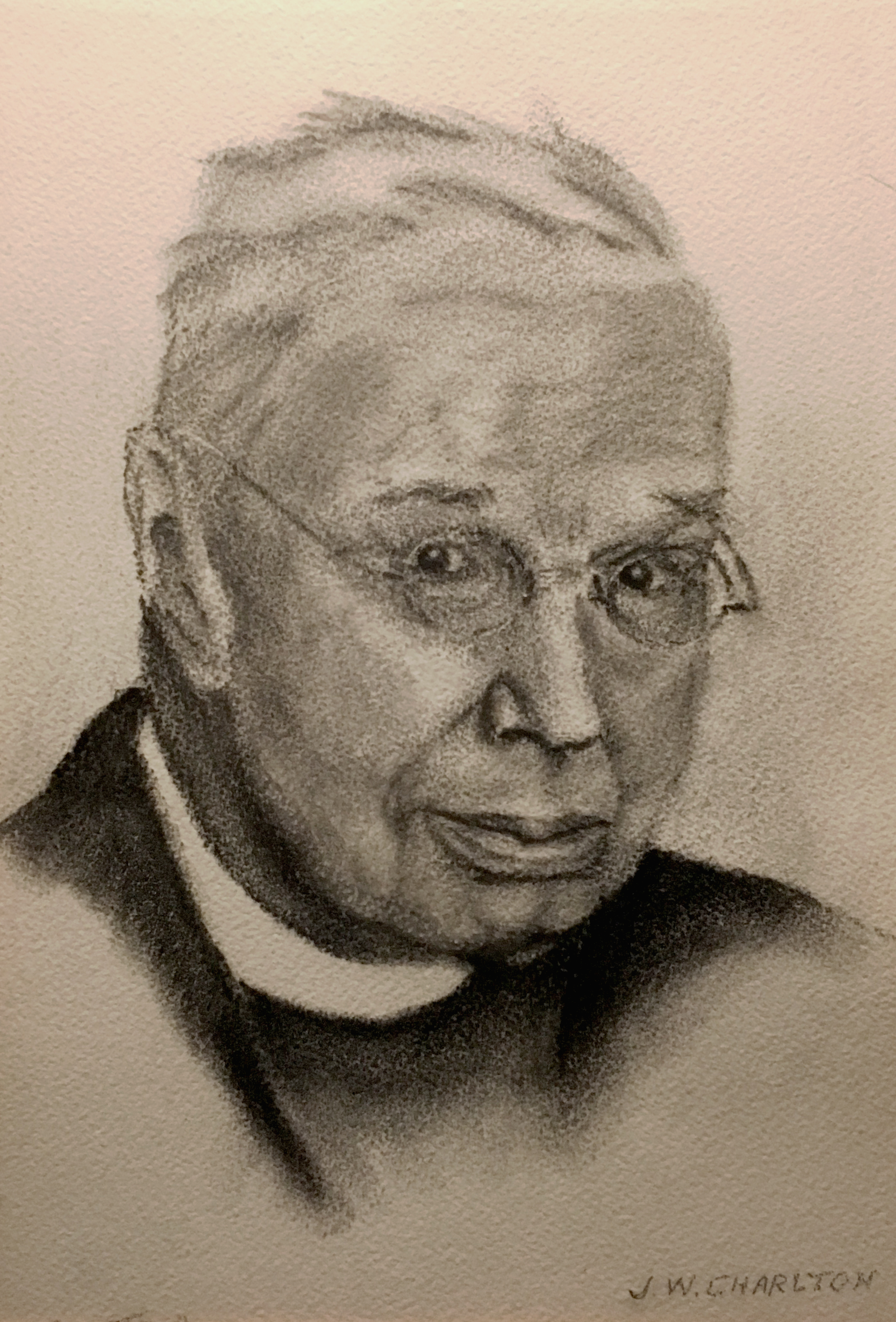
Sketch of Fr. Thomas Grassmann
