= Douw Fonda =

American settler (1700–1780)

Douw Jellise Fonda (1700–1780) was a settler and trader in the Mohawk Valley of New York State. The village of Fonda, New York is named for him.

The Fonda family fled to the Netherlands when the Reformation in Italy collapsed around 1600, then became Dutch Americans. Douw Fonda was born in Schenectady, New York, on August 22, 1700, the third child of Jillis (or Jelles) Adam and Rachel (Winnie) Fonda. He married Maritje Vrooman on October 29, 1725. Around 1751, he moved to Caughnawaga, a Mohawk Indian village on the Mohawk River ten miles west of today's Amsterdam. The couple had seven children. Maritje died in 1756, and Douw apparently remarried, to the widow Deborah (Veeder) Wimple.

Fonda "conducted a flourishing trading business" in Caughnawaga.

In 1780, British brigadier general Sir John Johnson led a party of about 528 Loyalists and Mohawk warriors on a raid into the Mohawk Valley. Many residents fled the area, but Fonda decided to stay and fight. On May 22, 1780, he was captured by a Mohawk called "One Armed Peter", with whom he was acquainted, tomahawked, and scalped. Fonda had been a longtime friend of Johnson's father Sir William Johnson, and Johnson was unhappy about the killing. In fact, he had made it a practice to spare many, who had been his neighbors before the Revolution. Johnson rebuked Peter for the killing, but Peter replied that "as it was the intention of the enemy to kill him, he thought he might as well get the bounty for his scalp as any one else!"

Two of Douw Fonda's sons, John and Adam, were taken prisoner in the raid and taken to Canada.
