= Middlefield station =

VTA light rail station in Mountain View, California

Middlefield
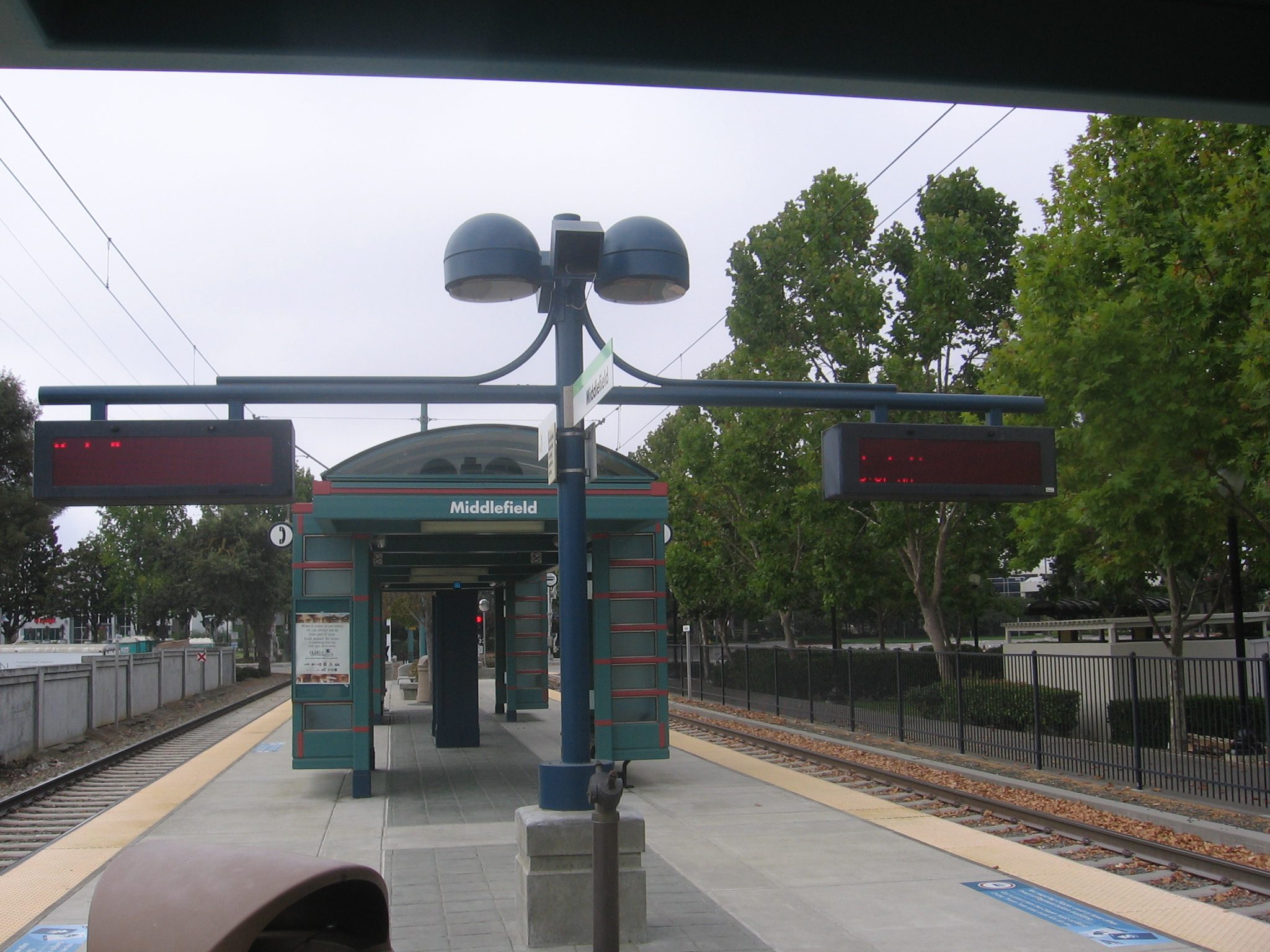
- Middlefield station platform, September 2012

General information
- Location: 580 East Middlefield Drive; Mountain View, California
- Coordinates: 37°23′44″N 122°03′08″W
- Owner: Santa Clara Valley Transportation Authority
- Platforms: 1 island platform
- Tracks: 2
- Connections: VTA Bus: 21; MVgo: A

Construction
- Structure type: At-grade
- Accessible: Yes

History
- Opened: December 20, 1999; 26 years ago

Services
Preceding station	VTA	Following station
Whisman toward Mountain View	Orange Line	Bayshore/NASA toward Alum Rock
Location

Middlefield station is a light rail station operated by Santa Clara Valley Transportation Authority (VTA), located in Mountain View, California. This station is served by the Orange Line of the VTA light rail system.

Middlefield station is surrounded by an industrial area which includes some transit-oriented development on Middlefield Road between Ellis Street and Logue Avenue. Nearby offices include the headquarters for Coupons.com, MobileIron, Synopsys and Symantec enterprise security.
