= Borregas station =

VTA light rail station in Sunnyvale, California

Borregas
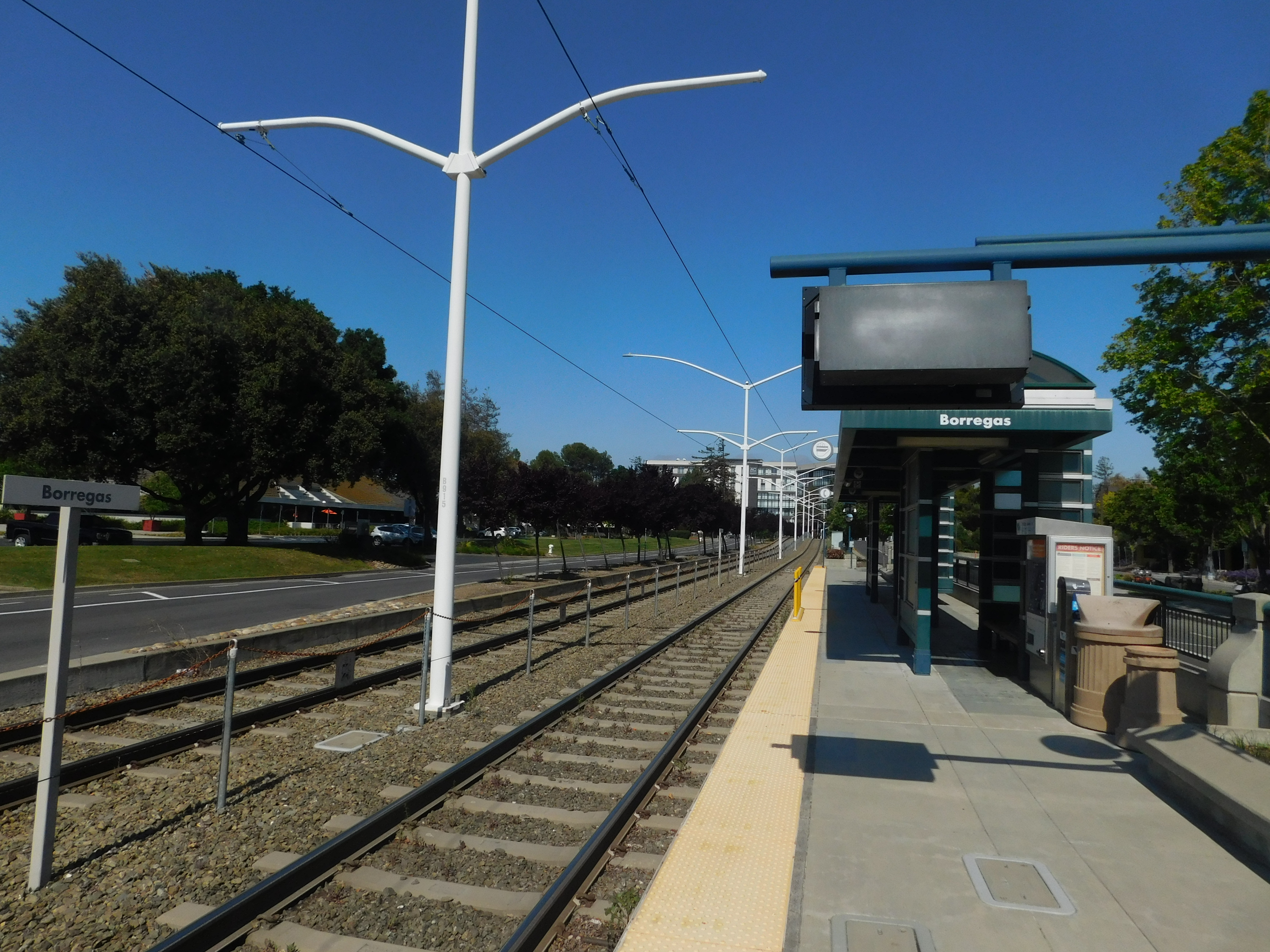
- Borregas station platform in May 2023.

General information
- Location: Java Drive and Borregas Avenue; Sunnyvale, California
- Coordinates: 37°24′42″N 122°01′05″W
- Owner: Santa Clara Valley Transportation Authority
- Platforms: 2 side platforms
- Tracks: 2
- Connections: VTA Bus: 56; ACE Shuttle: Red

Construction
- Structure type: At-grade
- Accessible: Yes

History
- Opened: December 20, 1999; 26 years ago

Services
Preceding station	VTA	Following station
Lockheed Martin toward Mountain View	Orange Line	Crossman toward Alum Rock
Location

Borregas station is a light rail station operated by Santa Clara Valley Transportation Authority (VTA), located near the intersection of Java Drive and Borregas Avenue in Sunnyvale, California. This station is served by the Orange Line of the VTA light rail system. The station is located in an industrial area; nearby offices include the headquarters of Infinera and Ruckus Networks.
