= Owen Crossman =

Australia international rugby union player (1902–1963)

- Born: Owen Clive Crossman; 14 November 1903 Glen Innes, New South Wales
- Died: c. 1963

Rugby union career
- Position: wing
International career
Years	Team	Apps	(Points)
1923–30	Wallabies	15	(29)

Owen Clive Crossman (14 November 1903 – c. 1963) was a rugby union player who represented Australia.

Crossman, a wing, was born in Glen Innes, New South Wales and claimed a total of 15 international rugby caps for Australia.
