= Crossman station =

VTA light rail station in Sunnyvale, California

Crossman
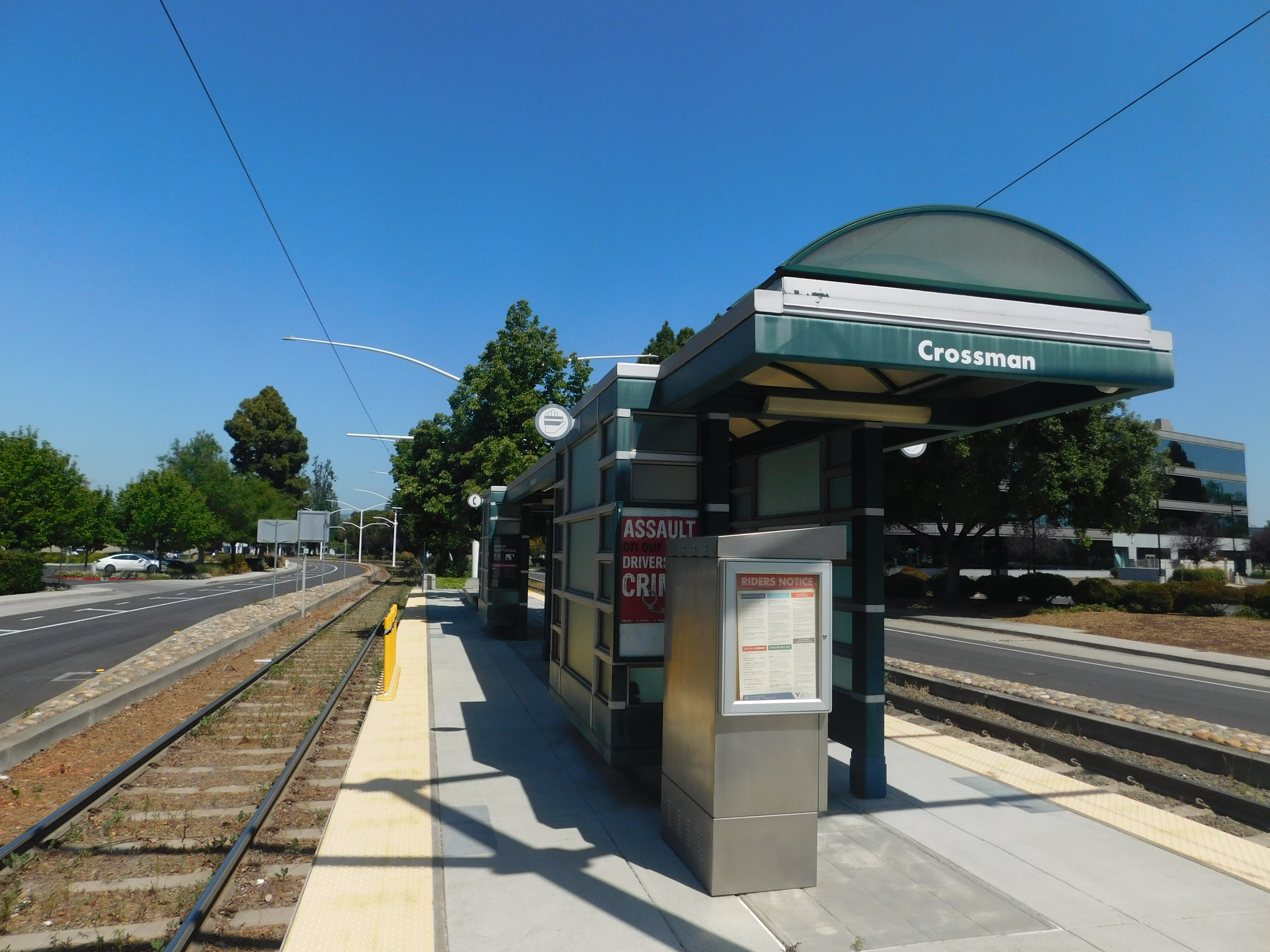
- Crossman station platform in May 2023.

General information
- Location: Java Drive and Crossman Avenue; Sunnyvale, California
- Coordinates: 37°24′33″N 122°00′41″W
- Owner: Santa Clara Valley Transportation Authority
- Platforms: 1 island platform
- Tracks: 2
- Connections: VTA Bus: 56; ACE Shuttle: Red

Construction
- Structure type: At-grade
- Accessible: Yes

History
- Opened: December 20, 1999; 26 years ago

Services
Preceding station	VTA	Following station
Borregas toward Mountain View	Orange Line	Fair Oaks toward Alum Rock
Location

Crossman station is a light rail station operated by Santa Clara Valley Transportation Authority (VTA), located near the intersection of Java Drive and Crossman Avenue in Sunnyvale, California. This station is served by the Orange Line of the VTA light rail system. It is located in an industrial area; nearby buildings include the headquarters of NetApp.
