= Caughnawaga Indian Village Site =

- U.S. National Register of Historic Places
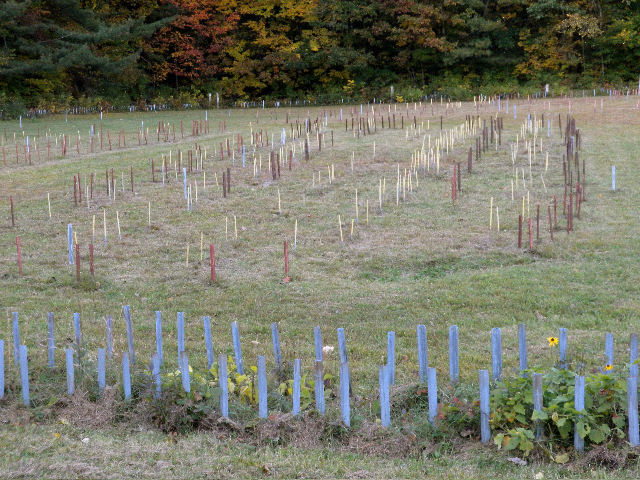
- Site of Caughnawaga with stakes marking the lines of the stockade and long houses.

- Location within New York Location within the United States
- Nearest city: Fonda, New York
- Coordinates: 42°57′17.96″N 74°23′34.79″W
- Area: 135 acres (55 ha)
- Built: 1666 (or 1679)
- NRHP reference No.: 73001207
- Added to NRHP: August 28, 1973

The Caughnawaga Indian Village Site (Mohawk: Kahnawà꞉ke, also known as the Veeder site) is a 17th-century archaeological site of a village of the Mohawk nation, located just west of the village of Fonda in Montgomery County, New York. The Mohawk were one of the original Five Nations of the Haudenosaunee, or Iroquois League, and lived west of Albany, occupying much of the Mohawk Valley. Other Haudenosaunee nations were located west of them and south of the Great Lakes.

The Mohawk had trading relationships with French colonists coming south from Quebec, with Dutch based in Albany, and with the later English who took over Dutch territory. Under pressure from the French in the late 17th century, some Mohawk moved to other areas. Some who had converted to Catholicism relocated to mission villages near Montreal and to the west along the St. Lawrence River.

Because most of the Mohawk in the New York state and Pennsylvania areas were allied with Great Britain during the American Revolutionary War, they were mostly forced out of New York when Britain ceded its territory in the colonies to the new United States. The Crown provided some land in compensation at what became the Six Nations Reserve of the Grand River, Ontario.

This former village site was discovered in 1950 by Rev. Thomas Grassmann. It is the only Mohawk village site in the country to have been completely excavated for archeological studies.

== Description ==
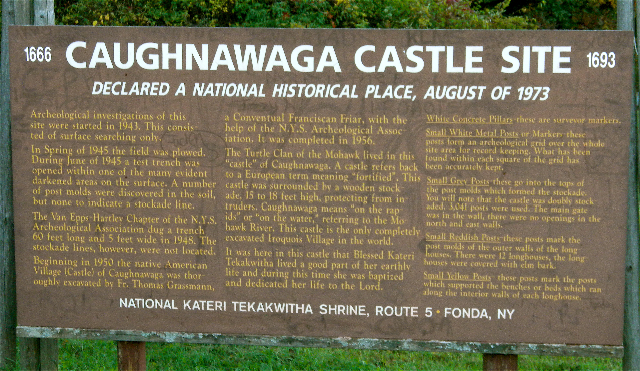
Interpretive sign for Caughnawaga site

The Caughnawaga site is open to the public. It lies on a hill on the north side of the Mohawk River near a natural spring, and was once protected by a defensive palisade. The outlines of twelve longhouses and stockade that existed 300 years ago are staked out.

The name is derived from the Mohawk word kahnawà꞉ke, meaning "place of the rapids", referring to the nearby rapids of the Mohawk River. The village was also known as Gandaouage; or Kachnawage, which has been glossed as "Indian Castle" or a "fortified place" in Mohawk.

The memorial is on the grounds of the Saint Kateri Tekakwitha National Shrine & Historic Site, a ministry dedicated to Kateri Tekakwitha, who was canonized in 2012 as the first Native North American saint in the Roman Catholic Church. Nearby on the Shrine grounds is the Mohawk-Caughnawaga Museum, which includes artifacts found at the dig site. Caughnawaga was listed on the National Register of Historic Places in 1973.

== History ==
Caughnawaga was occupied by the Mohawk from at least 1666 to 1693. French Jesuits established a mission there, which operated for about 10 years ranging from 1668 to 1679. They taught some of the Mohawk to read and write in French, and about Christianity. Historians now believe that the village was located upstream at the "Fox Farm site" until 1679, at which time it moved to this location.

Archeologist Dean Snow estimates the village had a population of around 300 people. This was fewer than had lived at the Fox Farm site. By 1679 some Catholic Mohawk had migrated to a mission village, Kahnawake, south of Montreal along the St. Lawrence River. That village is now one of several Mohawk reserves in Canada.

The Caughnawaga site in New York is now a center for recreation and culture.

== See also ==
- Caughnawaga, New York
