= George Crossman =

English cricketer and British Army officer

George Lytton Crossman, DSO (18 February 1877 – 17 January 1947) was a British Army officer and cricketer.

Crossman was a right-handed batsman and leg-break bowler who played for Gloucestershire. He was born in Hambrook, Gloucestershire and died in Colchester, Essex.

Crossman made two first-class appearances for the side during the 1896 County Championship. On his debut, against Warwickshire, he scored 1 run in the first innings in which he batted, and 4 runs in the second. In his second, and final appearance, against Nottinghamshire, Crossman scored 5 runs in the first innings in which he batted, and a single run in the second.

Crossman was commissioned a second lieutenant in The Prince of Wales's Own (West Yorkshire Regiment) on 20 February 1897, and promoted to lieutenant on 4 February 1899. He served in the Second Boer War 1899–1902, including as staff officer to the Railway Staff officer at Frederickstad. During the war he was part of the force sent to relieve Ladysmith, taking part in the battles of Colenso (December 1899), Spion Kop (January 1900), Vaal Kranz and the Tugela Heights (February 1900) leading up to the actual relief of the city on 1 March 1900. He stayed in Natal March to June 1900 until the British had re-taken the whole colony, then moved into Transvaal and took part in operations around Pretoria. For his service in the war, he was twice mentioned in despatches, received the Queen's South Africa Medal with five clasps, and was appointed a Companion of the Distinguished Service Order (DSO).
