= Hans Grassmann =

German physicist and author

Hans Grassmann (Bamberg, 21 May 1960) is a German physicist, writer and entrepreneur, who teaches and works in Italy. Grassmann is the author of four books and more than 250 scientific publications, and is the founder and managing director of the research company Isomorph srl.

His main contributions to physics include the development of a (Tl) calorimeter with a photodiode; developing the analysis of asymmetry in the production of the W particle; a contribution to the discovery of the top quark, the development of a physics theory of information; the design and development of a wind turbine with an external duct; and the realization of the linear mirror for the concentration of solar energy. Grassmann has worked in Italy since 1988.

== Life and work ==
=== Study of physics ===
From 1979 to 1984, Grassmann studied physics at the University of Erlangen and the University of Hamburg. For his laurea thesis, he developed a detection method for high energy photons using a scintillating crystal (CsI(Tl)) calorimeter with photodiode readout. Advanced scientific experiments make use of this technology, including the Crystal-Barrel, the BaBar, the CLEO, the Belle experiments and the Glast satellite.

From 1984 to 1988, Grassmann was part of the UA1 experiment at CERN in Geneva, where he wrote his PhD thesis.

From 1987 to 1999, Grassmann worked with the CDF collaboration at the Tevatron collider in the Fermi National Laboratory (Fermilab), close to Chicago and at the Superconducting Super Collider laboratory (Dallas).

In 1988 with his student, S. Leone, he developed the study of the asymmetry in production and decay of the W-boson at the Tevatron proton–antiproton collider. W bosons are predominantly produced in collisions of valence quarks; therefore, one can determine the kinematic properties of the up and down quarks in the proton and antiproton from the observation of W production. By analyzing the relative difference in the production of W^{+} and W^{−} particles, one can substantially reduce the effects of systematic uncertainties in the experimental device.

Since 1988, Grassmann has developed a method for detecting the top quark. The method makes use of the different kinematic properties of production and decay of top quark particles and background events, such as the production of W particles together with hadronic jets. In 1994, this analysis was successfully applied by Grassmann, G. Bellettini and M. Cobal. The top quark was observed in Tevatron collider data. These results were confirmed when the analysis was repeated on a larger data sample.

After the top quark discovery, Grassmann worked on a connection between the classic information theory of Claude Shannon, Gregory Chaitin and Andrey Kolmogorov et al. and physics. From work done by Leó Szilárd, Rolf Landauer and Charles H. Bennett, there is a connection between physics and information theory. Storing or deleting one bit of information dissipates energy; however, neither classic information theory nor algorithmic information theory contain any physics variables. The variable entropy used in information theory is not a state function; therefore, it is not the thermodynamic entropy used in physics. Grassmann made use of existing and established concepts, such as message, amount of information or complexity, but set them in a new mathematical framework. His approach is based on vector algebra or on Boolean algebra instead of probability theory.

=== Renewable Energies ===
Grassmann also developed an approach for studying shrouded wind turbines.

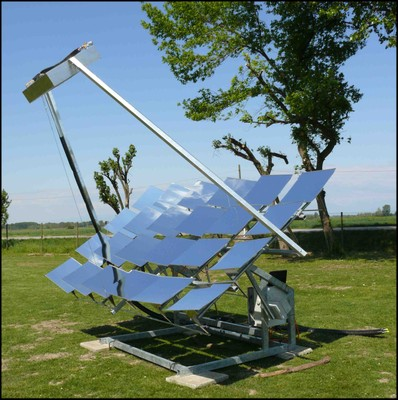
The Linear mirror

In 2006 Isomorph undertook the development of a system of mirrors - the so-called Linear mirror - for the concentration of solar energy. This system is a very simple and therefore inexpensive structure, which allows to create a full-scale prototype without the need of outside partners. In 'October 2008, the Linear mirror received its first award from the Italian Physical Society, which honors Alessandro Prest, an employee of the Isomorph, for the presentation of the project.

The mirror came into operation for the first time in autumn 2008, fulfilling all the expectations. In July 2010 the first Linear mirror was installed by the town of Pontebba to provide thermal energy to the local kindergarten. In the same year the town of Pontebba successfully participated to the National contest for the election of the most virtuous municipalities. In April 2011 Hans Grassmann has received the "Nuclear-Free Future Award, with the motivation that the Linear mirror can be able to contribute to the replacement of nuclear power.

In May 2012 the Linear mirror received the Solar keymark certificate by CERTCO DIN (DIN EN 12795-1:2006-06 and DIN EN 12795-2:2006-06). Tests for the Solar Keymark were carried out by the Fraunhofer Institute ISE Freiburg.

=== Entrepreneurship ===
In 2004, Grassmann founded Isomorph, which creates scientific concepts, procedures and devices based on physics research. Isomorph's research is independent of the scientific-administrative complex.

Isomorph developed an innovative concentrating mirror system to make economic use of solar energy. It is a simple system and cheap to produce.

=== Books ===
Grassmann has explained physics to the general public in books and newspaper articles, noting that "everybody can understand physics. What cannot be understood is not physics." His books about the relationship between science and society are available in several translations.

- Grassmann, H.: Das Top Quark, Picasso und Mercedes Benz – oder Was ist Physik?, Rowohlt Berlin, 1997, ISBN 3-87134-328-5.
- Grassmann, H.: Alles Quark? Ein Physikbuch, Rowohlt Berlin, Berlin, 2000, ISBN 3-87134-362-5.
- Grassmann, H.: Das Denken und seine Zukunft – von der Eigenart des Menschen, Hoffman und Campe, Hamburg, 2001, ISBN 3-455-09333-7.
- Grassmann, H.: Ahnung von der Materie – Physik für alle., Dumont, 2008, ISBN 978-3-8321-8082-9.
