= Crossman Pond =

Lake in United States of America

- Location within Massachusetts
- Location: Kingston, Massachusetts
- Coordinates: 41°59′23″N 70°45′25″W
- Primary outflows: unnamed stream
- Basin countries: United States
- Surface area: 15 acres (6.1 ha)

Crossman Pond is a 15-acre (61,000 m^{2}) pond in Kingston, Massachusetts, located off Wapping Road (Route 106) and South Street. The pond is hydro logically associated with a cranberry bog operation located to the west of the pond. The outflow is an unnamed stream that feeds the cranberry bog, ultimately leading to Fountainhead Brook, a tributary of the Jones River. The water quality is impaired due to non-native aquatic plants.
