= Graeme Crossman =

- Born: Graeme Murray Crossman; 30 November 1945 (age 80) New Plymouth, New Zealand
- Height: 1.78 m (5 ft 10 in)
- Weight: 86 kg (190 lb)
- School: Tamaki College

Rugby union career
- Position: Hooker
Provincial / State sides
Years	Team	Apps	(Points)
1972–76	Bay of Plenty	36	
International career
Years	Team	Apps	(Points)
1974–76	New Zealand	0	(0)
Coaching career
- Years: Team
- 1979–84: Bay of Plenty

Graeme Murray Crossman (born 30 November 1945) is a former New Zealand rugby union player. A hooker, Crossman represented Bay of Plenty at a provincial level, and was a member of the New Zealand national side, the All Blacks, from 1974 to 1976. He played 19 matches for the All Blacks, captaining the side in five games, but he did not gain any test caps. He later coached Bay of Plenty between 1979 and 1984.
