= Evelyn station =

Former light rail station in Mountain View, California

Evelyn
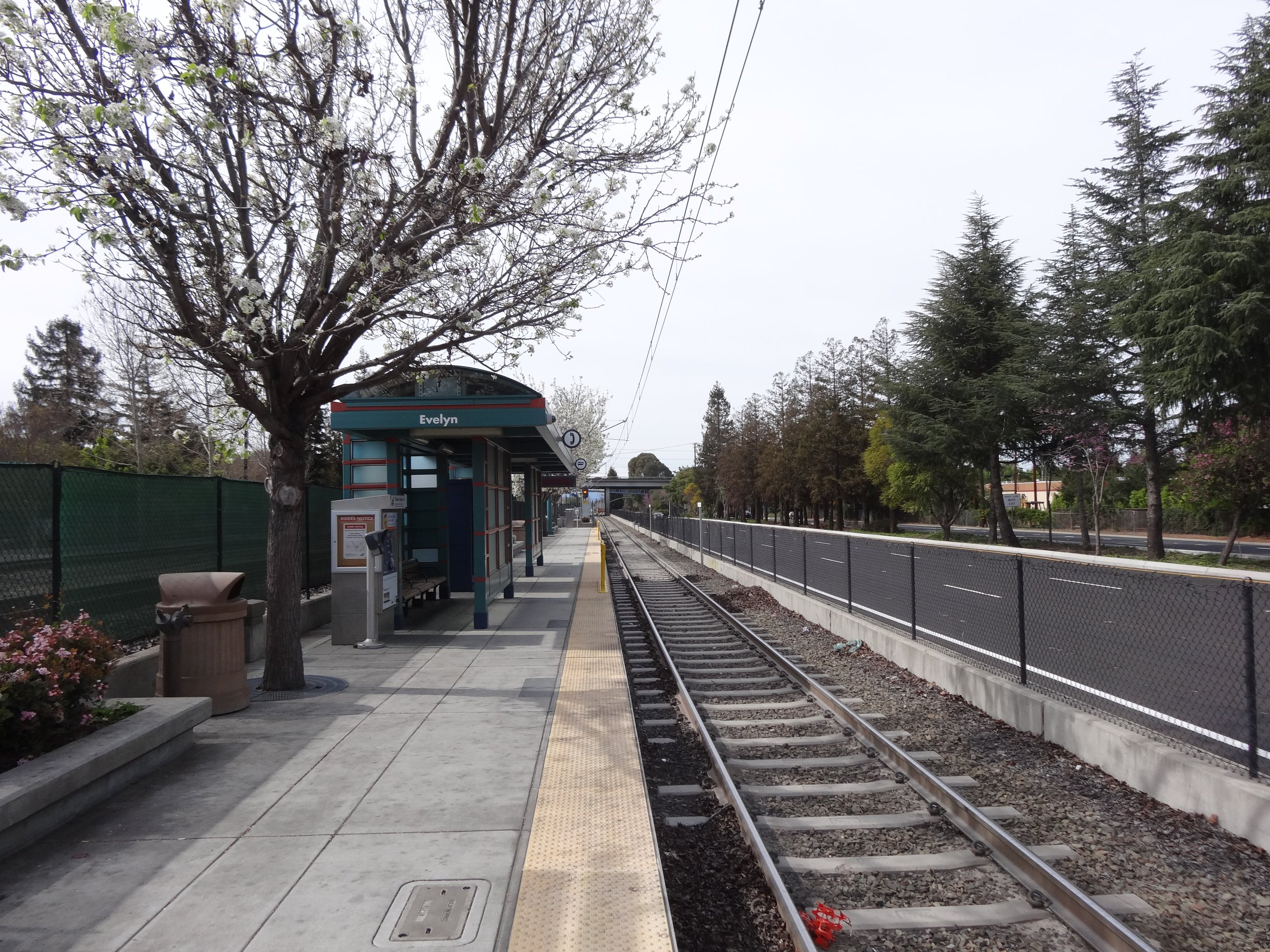
- Evelyn station on March 15, 2015, the day before its permanent closure

General information
- Location: Evelyn Avenue at Pioneer Way; Mountain View, California
- Coordinates: 37°23′27″N 122°03′59″W
- Platforms: 1 side platform

Construction
- Parking: 196 spaces
- Accessible: Yes

History
- Opened: December 17, 1999
- Closed: March 16, 2015

Former services
Preceding station	VTA	Following station
Mountain View Terminus	Orange Line	Whisman toward Alum Rock
Location

Evelyn station is a former VTA light rail station located in Mountain View, California. The station platform was on the then-single-track section east of Mountain View station. It was accessed via a pedestrian tunnel under the Caltrain tracks from Evelyn Avenue at the intersection with Pioneer Way. The station was closed and demolished in 2015 to permit double-tracking of the line.

== History ==
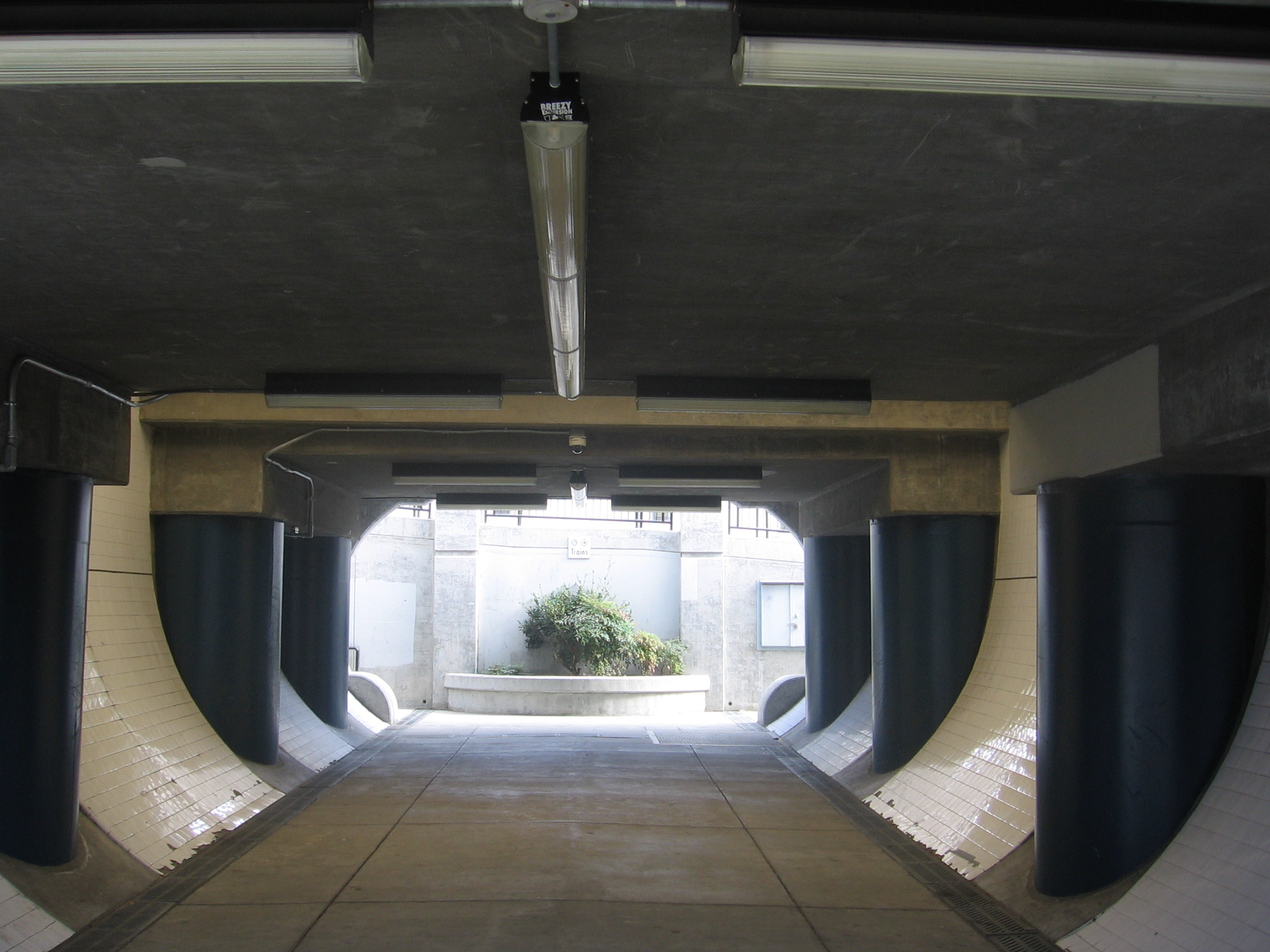
The pedestrian tunnel to the station in 2012

The station was built as part of the Tasman West extension project and opened December 17, 1999. The VTA decided in August 2014 to close and remove Evelyn station early in 2015. As part of the Light Rail Efficiency Project, a second track was added between Mountain View station and Whisman station for the VTA Green Line, and leaving Evelyn in place would have required narrowing Central Expressway and Evelyn Avenue to accommodate the track. According to VTA, the station was the second least-utilized station in the VTA light rail system.

After the station closed in 2015, the park and ride lot across the street from the station remained available to transit passengers, but was lightly used. In May 2019, the lot was leased to the City of Mountain View, who plans to use the lot as a safe place for people living in vehicles to park. The long-term plan is to use the two-acre parking lot parcel to build 180 affordable apartments.
