= Fonda, New York =

- Village
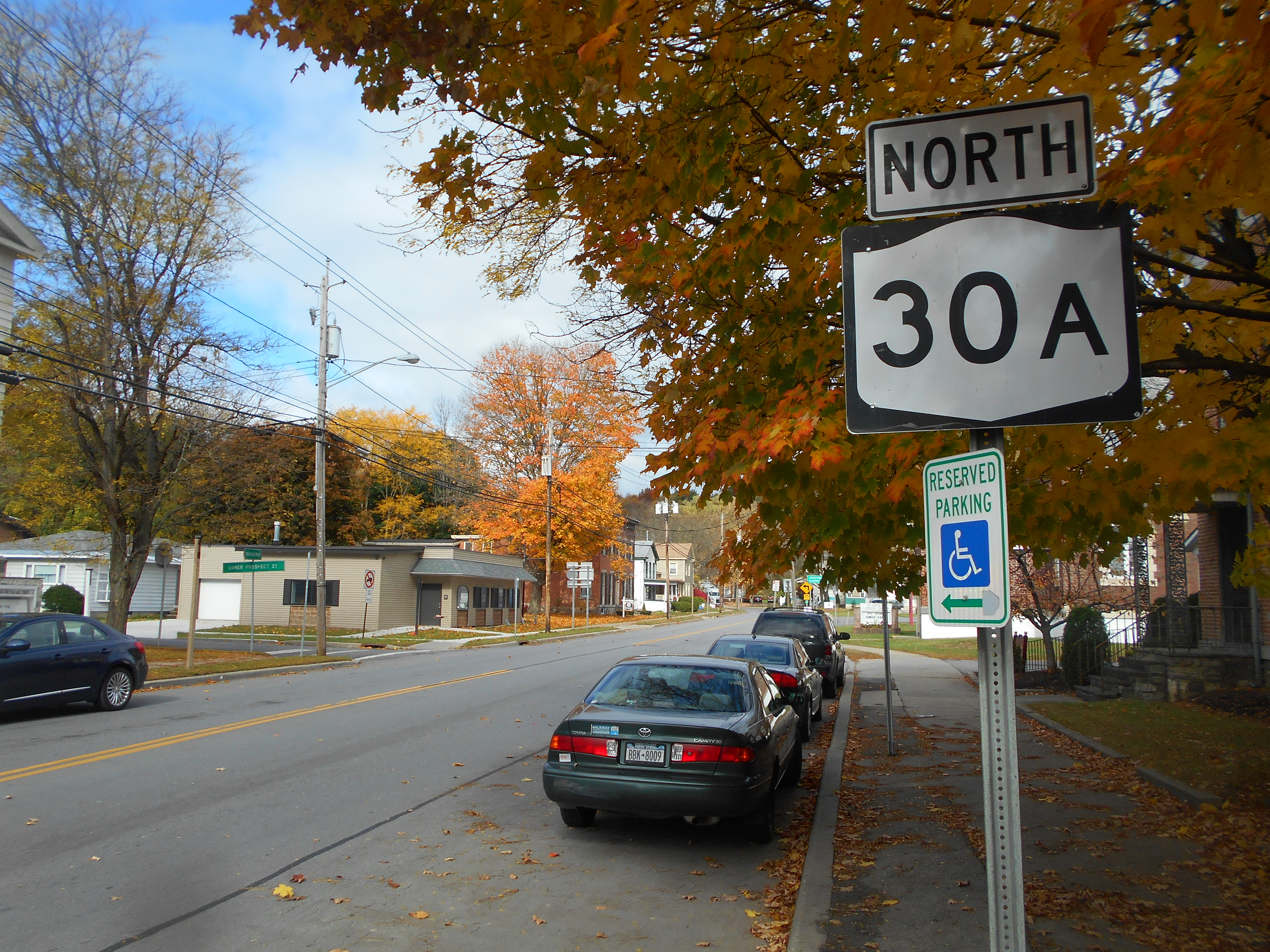
- NY30A through Fonda

- Location within New York Location within the United States
- Coordinates: 42°57′16″N 74°22′32″W
- Country: United States
- State: New York
- County: Montgomery
- Town: Mohawk
- Incorporated: 1850

Area
  - Total: 0.61 sq mi (1.58 km^{2})
  - Land: 0.54 sq mi (1.40 km^{2})
  - Water: 0.069 sq mi (0.18 km^{2})
- Elevation: 300 ft (90 m)

Population (2020)
  - Total: 668
  - Density: 1,238.7/sq mi (478.27/km^{2})
- Time zone: UTC-5 (Eastern (EST))
  - Summer (DST): UTC-4 (EDT)
- ZIP Code: 12068
- Area code: 518
- FIPS code: 36-26462
- GNIS feature ID: 0950363
- Website: villageoffonda.ny.gov

Fonda is a village in and the county seat of Montgomery County, New York, United States. The population was 668 at the 2020 census, down from 795 in 2010. The village developed at the site of a historic Mohawk settlement. It is named after Douw Fonda, a Dutch-American settler who was killed and scalped in 1780, during a Mohawk raid in the Revolutionary War. At that time the tribe was allied with the British, in the hopes of removing settlers from their territory.

The village of Fonda is in the town of Mohawk and is west of Amsterdam. The Fonda Fair is an annual agricultural event that takes place in August.

In 1993, a group of Mohawk people bought land near the village to re-establish the Kanatsiohareke community formerly at this site, and the historic presence of their people throughout the Mohawk Valley.

== History ==
Perspective map of Fonda with list of landmarks from 1889 by L.R. Burleigh

The village of Fonda developed near the site of the former Mohawk village of Caughnawaga, also known as Kahnawà:ke. Here the Mohawk had cultivated corn in the floodplain on the north side of the Mohawk River.

In the late 17th century, Kateri Tekakwitha resettled here. She was a Mohawk girl who had converted to Catholicism and become renowned for her piety. She lived here with relatives after her parents died in a smallpox epidemic. She had survived but was marked by scars. She was later canonized as the first Native American saint. A national Catholic shrine devoted to her was established here and is a pilgrimage destination.

After the French attacked the village in the late 17th century, Kateri and many other Catholic Mohawks moved to the Jesuit mission village of Kahnawake, established on the south side of the St. Lawrence River, opposite Montreal in Quebec.

Later European settlers in this area were mostly English and German. They officially organized the present-day village in 1751 at the former site of Kanatsiohareke. The settlement was later named for Douw Fonda, a Dutch-American settler who was scalped in a Mohawk raid during the Revolutionary War, when the Mohawk were allied with the British.

The Fonda family were ancestors of American actors Henry Fonda, and his children, Jane Fonda and Peter Fonda. Henry Fonda wrote about his ancestors in his 1981 autobiography, as follows:

Early records show the family ensconced in northern Italy in the 16th century where they fought on the side of the Reformation, fled to Holland, intermarried with Dutch burghers' daughters, picked up the first names of the Low Countries, but retained the Italianate "Fonda". Before Pieter Stuyvesant surrendered Nieuw Amsterdam to the English the Fondas, instead of settling in Manhattan, canoed up the Hudson River to the Indian village of Caughnawaga. Within a few generations, the Mohawks and the Iroquois were butchered or fled and the town became known to mapmakers as Fonda, New York.

== Nineteenth century to present ==
After the opening of the Erie Canal in 1825, Fonda thrived with the growth in trade and traffic that accompanied it. The canal provided transportation and commercial links to communities around the Great Lakes. Fonda became a center of cheesemaking, which was part of the regional dairy industry. The area was devoted to agriculture. As the county seat, it also did well with the arrival of the railroad in 1835, which increased cross-state transportation and shipping of goods. The village was incorporated in 1850.

In the mid to late-20th century, NASCAR held four races at the local Fonda Speedway (in 1955, 1966, 1967 and 1968) as part of the Fonda 200. In 1973 the Caughnawaga Indian Village Site, just outside the village limits, was listed on the National Register of Historic Places. It is the only Mohawk village in the country to have been fully excavated in archeological studies. The Walter Butler Homestead was listed on the NRHP in 1976.

== Kanatsiohareke ==
In 1993 Tom Porter (Mohawk) re-established the first Mohawk community in the valley since 1783; he bought land between Fonda and Palatine Bridge to cultivate corn and other agricultural produce. Other Mohawk joined him at this historic village site, naming their community Kanatsiohareke. This is the first land the Mohawk have held in the valley since being forced out in 1783 after the Revolution, when Great Britain ceded its former territories in the colonies to the United States. The name Kanatsiohareke means "The Place of the Clean Pot", referring to a ten-foot-wide and ten-foot-deep pothole in the creek bed caused by rock scouring.

== Geography ==
Fonda is located in northeastern Montgomery County at 42°57′16″N 74°22′32″W (42.954342, -74.375424), along the southern edge of the town of Mohawk. The southern boundary of the village and town is the Mohawk River, an east-flowing tributary of the Hudson. The Erie Canal is part of the Mohawk River at this point. The village of Fultonville borders Fonda to the south across the river.

New York State Route 5, New York State Route 30A, and New York State Route 334 all serve Fonda, with NY 334 having its southern terminus at NY 5 at the western end. NY-5 leads east 10 miles (16 km) to Amsterdam and southwest 11 miles (18 km) to Palatine Bridge, while NY-30A leads north 4 miles (6 km) to Johnstown and south 15 miles (24 km) to Sloansville. NY-334 leads northwest from Fonda 4 miles (6 km) to Sammonsville. The New York State Thruway (Interstate 90 passes through Fultonville, just south of Fonda, with access from Exit 28. The Thruway leads southeast 40 miles (60 km) to the Albany area and west 50 miles (80 km) to the Utica area.

Amtrak's Empire Corridor passes through the village, though it has no station here; the closest stations are Amsterdam to the east and Utica to the west.

According to the U.S. Census Bureau, the village of Fonda has a total area of 0.61 square miles (1.58 km^{2}), of which 0.54 square miles (1.40 km^{2}) are land and 0.07 square miles (0.18 km^{2}), or 11.35%, are water. Cayadutta Creek joins the Mohawk River at Fonda.

== Demographics ==
Historical population
Census	Pop.	Note	%±
1870	1,092		—
1880	944		−13.6%
1890	1,190		26.1%
1900	1,145		−3.8%
1910	1,100		−3.9%
1920	2,208		100.7%
1930	1,170		−47.0%
1940	1,123		−4.0%
1950	1,026		−8.6%
1960	1,004		−2.1%
1970	1,120		11.6%
1980	1,006		−10.2%
1990	1,007		0.1%
2000	810		−19.6%
2010	795		−1.9%
2020	668		−16.0%
U.S. Decennial Census

As of the census of 2000, there were 810 people, 351 households, and 209 families residing in the village. The population density was 1,520.2 inhabitants per square mile (587.0/km^{2}). There were 409 housing units at an average density of 767.6 per square mile (296.4/km^{2}). The racial makeup of the village was 97.53% White, 0.37% African American, 0.25% Native American, 0.49% Asian, 0.12% Pacific Islander, 0.12% from other races, and 1.11% from two or more races. Hispanic or Latino of any race were 2.22% of the population.

There were 351 households, out of which 29.9% had children under the age of 18 living with them, 36.2% were married couples living together, 17.4% had a female householder with no husband present, and 40.2% were non-families. 35.9% of all households were made up of individuals, and 19.4% had someone living alone who was 65 years of age or older. The average household size was 2.29 and the average family size was 2.90.

In the village, the population was spread out, with 25.4% under the age of 18, 8.0% from 18 to 24, 28.1% from 25 to 44, 19.4% from 45 to 64, and 19.0% who were 65 years of age or older. The median age was 36 years. For every 100 females, there were 82.4 males. For every 100 females age 18 and over, there were 78.7 males.

The median income for a household in the village was $28,021, and the median income for a family was $35,714. Males had a median income of $28,333 versus $23,500 for females. The per capita income for the village was $15,330. About 6.7% of families and 11.7% of the population were below the poverty line, including 13.9% of those under age 18 and 14.5% of those age 65 or over.
