= Eugene Gressman =

- Born: Clifford Eugene Gressman; April 18, 1917; Lansing, Michigan
- Died: January 23, 2010 (aged 92); Chapel Hill, North Carolina
- Occupation: Legal scholar
- Spouse: Nan Gressman (m. 1944–2004)
- Children: 4

Academic background
- Education: University of Michigan Law School

Academic work
- Discipline: Constitutional law
- Institutions: University of North Carolina School of Law

Eugene Gressman (April 18, 1917 – January 23, 2010) was an American lawyer and legal scholar whose expertise centered on the Supreme Court of the United States. With Robert L. Stern, he was the co-author of the book Supreme Court Practice, which is considered the preeminent lawyers' guide to the Court's practices and procedures.

== Early life and education ==
Gressman was born on April 18, 1917, in Lansing, Michigan. His father was a lawyer and fundamentalist minister, and his mother was a librarian. He enrolled at the University of Michigan 1934, graduating with a A.B. degree in 1938. He received his law degree with distinction from the University of Michigan Law School in 1940.

== Early career ==
After graduating law school, Gressman worked at the Securities and Exchange Commission for three years until 1943, when he began clerking for Supreme Court Justice Frank Murphy. He continued to clerk for Murphy until the latter's death in 1948, making his the longest clerkship in the history of the Supreme Court. Gressman's experience clerking for Murphy marked the beginning of a long relationship with the Supreme Court, and with many of its justices. He subsequently began working in private practice at the Washington, D. C.-based law firm Van Arkel & Kaiser, where his work focused primarily on labor law and appellate practice. He continued to work at this firm for nearly thirty years before leaving to become a law professor.

== Academic career ==
In 1977, Gressman left private practice to become the William R. Kenan, Jr. Professor at the University of North Carolina School of Law. He remained on the faculty there until retiring in 1987. In the same year he retired, he received the Frederick B. McCall Award for Teaching Excellence from the University of North Carolina School of Law. When he retired from the University of North Carolina in 1987, the North Carolina Law Review dedicated an issue to his retirement, which featured a tribute to Gressman by then-Supreme Court Justice Lewis F. Powell Jr. In his article, Justice Powell noted that Gressman was "a lawyer whose name is closely associated with the Supreme Court Justices". He then joined the faculty of the Seton Hall University School of Law as its Richard J. Hughes Distinguished Visiting professor of law, a position he held from 1987 to 1994, after which he returned to the University of North Carolina School of Law as a professor emeritus.

== Personal life and death ==
Gressman was married to Nan Gressman, an artist, for sixty years prior to her death in 2004. They had four children together: William, Nancy, Margot, and Eric. Eugene Gressman died on January 23, 2010, in Chapel Hill, North Carolina, at the age of 92.
