= The Deaf Club =

Music venue in San Francisco, California (1978–1980)

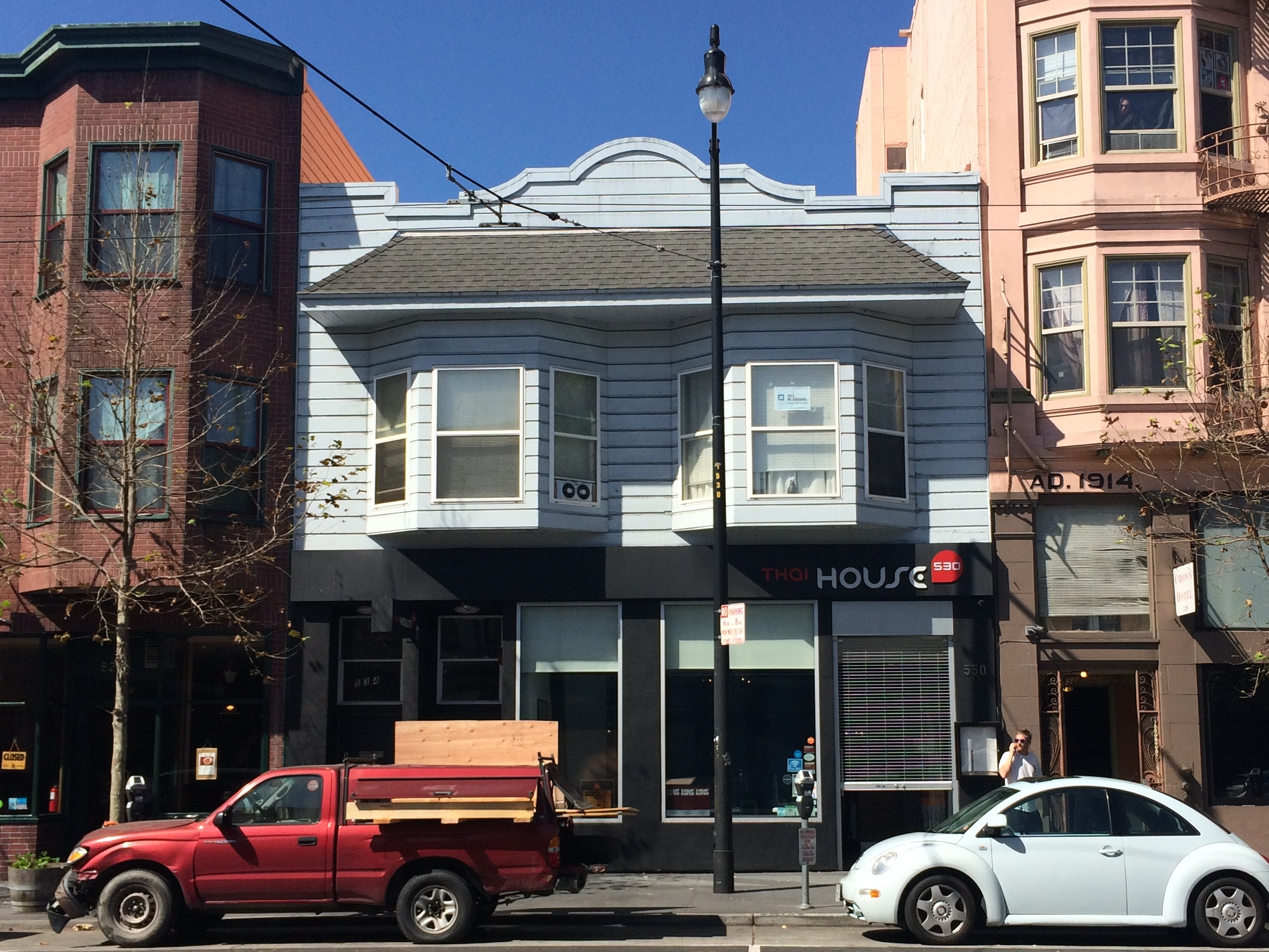
- Former location of the Deaf Club, as seen in 2015
- Interactive map of The Deaf Club
- Location: 530 Valencia Street, San Francisco, California, U.S.
- Type: music
- Event: punk

Construction
- Opened: December 9, 1978
- Closed: Summer 1980

The Deaf Club was a notable music venue located on Valencia Street in the Mission District of San Francisco, which remained open for an 18-month period in the late 1970s. Its main attraction was punk music. The name comes from the fact the building it was in originally began as a deaf people's clubhouse in the 1930s.

== Founding ==
Daphne Hanrahan, manager of The Offs, discovered the San Francisco Club for the Deaf, and was able to rent it on a nightly basis.

She remembers finding the place: "I bought a burrito at La Cumbre and noticed a sign on the fire escape across the street. It said 'Hall for Rent.' I went up the flights of stairs and saw two guys watching TV with the sound off. After a very short while, I realized we weren't going to communicate, so I wrote on a piece of paper that I wanted to rent the place. Bill—I never knew his last name—was a mustachioed, lascivious, cigar-chewing character who apparently was in charge. He wrote 'OK & $250,' so I wrote 'OK.'"

The first show as the Deaf Club on 9 December 1978 featured the Offs, started by guitarist Billy Hawk and singer Don Vinil, and later joined by former Hot Tuna drummer Bob Steeler and a rotation of horn players including Bob Roberts, Richard Edson and Roland Young. They were accompanied by The Mutants, who are known for their theatrical performances which often include elaborate props, projections, and comical antics. They are credited with being one of the first "Art-punk" bands in San Francisco, and were one of the most popular bands of the San Francisco punk scene during the late 1970s and early 1980s. On The Rag also participated in the Deaf Club's first show.

Over 100 bands such as Northern California's The Dead Kennedys, Tuxedomoon, The Units, The Zeros, Crime, The Dils, Flipper, Negative Trend, Los Microwaves, The Jars, Minimal Man, Voice Farm, Humans, Pearl Harbor and the Explosions, The Sleepers, Avengers, Factrix, Bpeople, S.S.I., NON, MX-80, V.I.P$, K.G.B., Pink Section, The Mutants, Realtors, Contractions, Monitor, Blowdryers, BoB, VKTMS, Snuky Tate, JJ180, On The Rag, Noh Mercy, No Alternative; as well as Southern California's Bags, The Alley Cats, Germs, X, Soul Rebels, Walking Dead, Wall of Voodoo, The Rotters, Seizure, Z'EV, Barry Kooda Kombo, Vs., Fillmore Struts, Punts, Inflatable Boy Clams, Jah Hovah, Plugz, Suburbs, The Vandals, The Controllers, Nervous Gender, U.X.A., Dinettes, and some touring bands from Vancouver like D.O.A., Pointed Sticks, and Subhumans, and even touring bands from England like Levi and the Rockats would play this small underground club.

Given the unique nature of the venue and its location in the Mission District near 16th Street and the Roxie Theater, it was enthusiastically supported by the punk and arts community, visited by film greats like John Waters and occasionally challenged by the officials of the San Francisco noise abatement patrol, the police, fire department, health department and the alcohol and beverage control until it closed.

The house DJs were Enrico Chandoha who worked on the editorial staff of the early Thrasher Magazine; Jack Fan (an Offs road manager and chef at the Zuni); BBC celebrity Johnnie Walker; and Daphne Hanrahan.

About such venues, Brendan Earley of The Mutants said:

"The earthiness, I guess, of playing places like the Deaf Club seemed to have a lot more energy to them. You know the crowd that started coming to this music in '77, it was maybe a peak of their scene, or the scene at that time. They were not normal kinds of clubs, they weren't places like the Stone, or even the Mabuhay, really. They were neat places to play; often good audiences, and good energy going on."

Author Martin Schneider wrote:

"A possibly unique aspect of the club was the constant presence of actual deaf people in the hall, who didn't know what to make of their unruly musical cohorts—but counterintuitively, they did seem to enjoy the music. Indeed, punk music might be tailor-made for deaf people to enjoy, because of the constant frenetic thudding of the 4/4 beat that can be sensed as vibrations. As Penelope Houston of The Avengers said, 'It was kind of amazing. I think they were dancing to the vibrations. The deaf people were amused that all these punks wanted to come in and rent their room and have these shows.' According to artist Winston Smith, 'They put their hands on the table and they could hear the music. It was music they could appreciate because it was so loud.'"

In an interview, Daphne Hanrahan said: "The social aspect of being able to participate and be accepted was big for the deaf people. They enjoyed being exposed to a different subculture like their own. It was very convivial, no fights or hassles.

== Walking Dead Records compilation albums ==
The four partners in Walking Dead Records developed a live compilation project that resulted in an album released by Optional Record distribution of Berkeley on the Walking Dead label: "Can You Hear Me? Music From the Deaf Club." It was recorded on a mobile 8 track by Jim Keylor (also of Army Street Studios), DJ'ed by Johnnie Walker, produced by Daphne Hanrahan who also managed and booked the Club, and coordinated by Peter Worrall. The photos selected for the album were taken by Sue Brisk, the album art was by Diana Miami (aka Diana Stumbo) and the liner notes were written by V. Vale of RE/Search/Search & Destroy. It was recorded live at the club during early 1979 and is a testament to the authentic underground punk and "new wave" scene during that period in San Francisco's music history. The album featured The Mutants' "Tribute to Russ Meyer" and "Monster of Love" and performances from other first and second generation San Francisco Punk bands like:

- Offs – "Hundred Dollar Limo", "Die Babylon", "I've Got the Handle" (Offs were: Don Vinyl, Billy Hawk, Bob Roberts now of Spotlight Tattoo in Los Angeles, Bob Steeler and Denny Boredom who also played with Hot Tuna)
- Pink Section – "Jane Blank", Francine's List" & "Been In The Basement 30 Years" (Pink Section was: singer Judy Gittelsohn and drummer Carol Detweiler (both members of Inflatable Boy Clams), singer / guitarist Matt Heckert (Survival Research Laboratories), and bassist Stephen Wymore.)
- Tuxedomoon – "19th Nervous Breakdown", courtesy of The Rolling Stones and "Heaven" from the film Eraserhead (Tuxedomoon was: Winston Tong, Steven Brown, Blane Reinenger, Peter Carcinogenic (Principle), Greg Langston on drums, With Bruce Geduldig on visuals)
- KGB – "Dying in the USA" & "Picture Frame Seduction"
- Dead Kennedys with "Police Truck", "California Uber Alles", "Short Songs" & "Straight A's". Raymond Pepperell Jr., better known as East Bay Ray of the Dead Kennedys used the original two track safety masters from that live eight track recording to release their recent 2004 Live at the Deaf Club CD.

From the Deaf Club, Walking Dead also produced, with William Passerelli, Dirk Dirksen (Mabuhay Gardens), Paul Rat Bachavich (Temple Beautiful) & Goody Thompson: the Western Front Festival. The festival engaged the Deaf Club and every venue, (including the "art clubs": A.R.E., Target Video, Valencia Tool & Die, Club Foot, the A-hole and Club Generic) in the San Francisco Bay Area that embraced punk culture and music for a week long event.

== Reviews ==
In a conversation with Hanrahan at the Deaf Club during a show during the Western Front with one of the Dinettes of San Diego, Joel Selvin, a music critic for the San Francisco Chronicle, who was attracted by the energy surrounding the punk scene, promised to "put the scene on the map." Selvin authored an extensive article published in the San Francisco Chronicle, October 22, 1979 on page 6 entitled "S.F. Goes Punk." It documented the scene during that time and included interviews with Dirk Dirksen, Joe Rees, Daphne Hanrahan, Johnnie Walker and Paul Rat Bachavich. He also mentioned the Deaf Club in a subsequent publication: "San Francisco: The Musical History Tour : A Guide to over 200 of the Bay Area's Most Memorable Music Sites" where he disparages the Club as "one of the stranger scenes on the punk rock scene."

Herb Caen, in his daily San Francisco Chronicle column on August 13, 1979, said:

"I don't know about you, but I find it slightly bizarre that The Deaf Club at 530 Valencia – indeed a social hangout for deaf people – features punk rock groups, such as Zen, Off, The Pink Section, Blow Driers and Mutants. 'The louder the better!' beams Edward Juaregui, executive director of Deaf Self Help. 'We all like to dance, and we can feel the vibrations.' How about the neighbors? 'Oh,' continued Edward, "they're going crazy. They keep calling the cops, complaining the noise is deafening. Isn't that rich?'"

Ethan Davison, a fan, said:

"The most interesting thing about the Deaf Club was that it was a real Deaf Club. The members stood around with the rest of us drinking the powerful drinks. I don't sign, so I never 'spoke' to any of them, but what I was told was that they enjoyed our music because they could feel the vibrations on the floor. I imagine that they also enjoyed the visual display, for we were the most visually interesting visual community at the time. People would dye their hair a different shade of blue, green, or purple every week. It can now be said that I never had trouble buying a Bloody Mary, even though I was sixteen."

Kathy Peck, of the Contractions, remembers the Deaf Club fondly:

"The place was filthy. My boots would stick to the floor. The deaf people would dance to the vibration of the beat. Daphne Hanrahan would do a radio show with Johnny Walker (BBC punk rock DJ) on the side of the stage, it seems. Daphne Hanrahan, manager of the Offs discovered the San Francisco Club for the Deaf in 1978, and was able to rent it on a nightly basis. It was great fun. The Deaf Club was more a like a neighborhood place, very underground, in the Mission District. People would give the deaf sign for a beer as the Offs, the Contractions, Middle Class, No Alternative, and the Dils played. People like Ginger Coyote (Punk Globe) would hang out, dance, and drink. The bathroom was full of graffiti. We'd load in, and the punk bands would always get in crazy fights, especially Brittley Black, drummer of Crime, who fell out of the upstairs window many a night.The deaf people were receptive. They could 'hear' through the wooden floor—a simple floor, made from planks or linoleum. It could catch the vibrations. Frank Moore from the Outrageous Beauty Pageant was there in his wheelchair that people dragged upstairs, since it was on the second floor. Dirk Dirksen (Mabuhay club promoter and San Francisco music icon) nurtured his career."

Bonnie Hayes from the Punts said, "The club was utterly un-controlled, which was one of the best things about it. It was basically like a big, really messy party at someone's house. It seemed private, like an inside thing --- you would meet everybody and be in the family."

In a conversation with Klaus Flouride of The Dead Kennedys, he looked back at the state of the Deaf Club:

"I remember it being working-class, but I don't remember it being that dingy, but we played an awful lot of pretty dingy punk clubs. That didn't ever impress upon me that much. I think that 'California Über Alles' might have come out by the time we played there, but I really don't think so, because we still had 6025 in the group. So, it was still before we had a single out. We were still early on in the thing. There was a folding table in the back. They sold cans of Budweiser. I think it was for like a buck apiece. Back then, you could get Buds for $2.50 or $3.00 a six-pack, or something like that, so they were doing okay. That was your bar. The thing that impressed me the most was that when we were watching the Germs I was right up front, and I was trying to talk to the person next to me. Everybody was grabbing somebody's ear and hollering to try and talk, whereas the deaf members, the people who were deaf and frequented the place on an everyday basis, would just lean forward towards the stage and sign each other— no problem with communication."

Esmerelda Kent of Noh Mercy said:

"The Deaf Club was down the street from our 'house' which was a ginormous storefront, 1920s dry goods store on Valencia Street that is now Artists Television Access (ATA Gallery) at 992 Valencia St., where me, Tony Hotel, and our manager (and Tuxedomoon's manager) Adrian Craig lived. We had a huge basement that had secret passages (connecting all the block) where we used to record and practice. The Deaf Club was my favorite club because of how strange it was. One night after we played at the end of the night, I went backstage and changed and I thought everyone had left because it was so quiet I was sure I was alone. I went out and the room was full with over a hundred people all signing. I wondered if drunk deaf people slurred their sign language.They loved the music because they could feel it. Deafness knows no specific demographic, so rich, poor, old, young, black, Asian, anyone could be and often was deaf and they were all there. Who knew? It was great to write a note of what you wanted to the bartender and see old ladies drinking with spiked mohawk punks."

== Closing ==
The club closed in the summer of 1980, with a party hosted by the artist and filmmaker Bruce Conner. The club had a history of being closed for various reasons, such as by the fire marshal for the lack of sprinklers. Holding private parties with a closed door policy was a way of it continuing to run. As Biafra said, "The magic of the Deaf Club was its intimate sweaty atmosphere, kind of like a great big house party. The club remained raw to the very end."

== See also ==
- Mabuhay Gardens
