= Subterranean Records =

Subterranean Records is an independent record label based in San Francisco. Founded by Steve Tupper and a then partner, Michael Fox in 1979, it focused on that city's underground punk and industrial music scene.

Subterranean and fellow punk/alt/underground San Francisco label Alternative Tentacles both sprang forth from the DIY punk movement in 1979, and were quite successful on college and community radio stations in the US. These labels helped define the San Francisco punk movement. Subterranean was the more avant garde of the two. While originally just focused on documenting and promoting the SF area, over the years Subterranean has released records by artists from many areas and genres. Like many small DIY labels, Steve Tupper noted that bands were chosen based on his musical tastes.

Subterranean had a small storefront record shop on Valencia Street for about 4 years, from about 1984 to 1988.

The label has released a number of important underground albums, most notably four LPs by the band Flipper. The Dead Kennedys also released an important single on the label.

== Catalog ==
This list is organized by catalog number, a roughly chronological number system established by the label and typically printed on or assigned to each official release.

Year	No.	Artist	Title	Co-releases & Re-releases
1979	SUB01	Various Artists	SF Underground (7-inch EP)	
1980	SUB02	Society Dog	Working Class People (7-inch EP)	
1980	SUB03	Various Artists	Live At Target (LP)	
1980	SUB04	The Jars	Start Rite Now (7-inch single)	
1980	SUB05	Bay Of Pigs	Addiction / Aliens (7-inch single)	
1980	SUB06	Tools	Hard Wark / The Road Forever (7-inch single)	
1981	SUB07	Flipper	Love Canal / Ha Ha Ha (7-inch single)	
1981	SUB08	Various artists	Club Foot (LP)	
1980	SUB09	No Alternative	Backtracks (7-inch single)	
1980	SUB10	Various Artists	S.F. Underground 2 (7-inch EP)	
1981	SUB11	Tools	#3 E.P. (7-inch EP)	
1981	SUB12	Ultrasheen	City Boy (7-inch EP)	
1981	SUB13	Society Dog	...Off Of The Leash (7-inch EP)	
1981	SUB14	Stefan Weisser	Poextensions & Contexts (7-inch single)	
1983	SUB14-2	Stefan Weisser	Editeditions Contexts (7-inch single)	
1981	SUB15	Various Artists	Red Spot (LP)	
1981	SUB16	Various Artists	Arizona Disease (7-inch EP)	
1981	SUB17	The Witch Trials	The Witch Trials (LP)	Alternative Tentacles & New Rose Records
1981	SUB18	Minimal Man	The Shroud Of (LP)	
1981	SUB19	Pre Fix	Underneathica / Ectomorphine (7-inch single)	
1981	SUB20	Inflatable Boy Clams	Inflatable Boy Clams (2×7″ EP)	
1981	SUB21	Nervous Gender	Music From Hell (LP)	
1981	SUB22	Wilma	Pornography Lies (7-inch single)	
1981	SUB23	Flipper	Sexbomb / Brainwash (7-inch single)	
1981	SUB24	Dead Kennedys	Nazi Punks Fuck Off! / Moral Majority (7-inch single)	Alternative Tentacles
1981	none	Factrix Cazazza	Night Of The Succubus (VHS)	
1982	SUB25	Flipper	Album Generic Flipper (LP)	
1982	SUB26	Factrix Cazazza	California Babylon (LP)	
1982	SUB27	Code Of Honor / Sick Pleasure	Fight Or Die / Dolls Under Control (LP)	
1982	SUB28	Tom Tadlock	Body Ad / Poker Keno (7-inch single)	
1986	SUB29	Stefan Weisser	Life Sentence — An uns Retrospective (cassette box)	
1982	SUB30	Z'EV	Elemental Music (LP)	
1982	SUB31	Chrome	Box (5×LP)	Cleopatra Records
1983	SUB32	Negative Trend	Negative Trend (aka: We Don't Play We Riot 12-inch) (7-inch EP)	2.13.61 Records
1985	SUB33	Z'EV	My Favorite Things (LP)	
1982	SUB34	Chrome	Anorexic Sacrifice (7-inch single)	
1982	SUB35	Flipper	Get Away (7-inch single)	
1982	SUB36	Code Of Honor	What Are We Gonna Do? (7-inch single)	
1983	SUB37	Tana Emmolo-Smith / Joseph T. Jacobs	Prescient Dreams / Zanoni (7-inch single)	
1983	SUB38	Lose	What’s Your Name? / Waking To Sleep (7-inch single)	
1983	SUB39	Sick Pleasure	Sick Pleasure (7-inch EP)	
1983	SUB40	The Leather Nun	Prime Mover (7-inch single)	Scabri Records
1983	SUB41	Arkansaw Man	Every Job (7-inch single)	
1983	UR 3996	Minimal Man	Two Little Skeletons / Tired Death (7-inch single)	
1984	SUB42	Flipper	Gone Fishin' (LP)	Fundamental Records, Domino Recording Company
1984	SUB43	Code Of Honor	Beware The Savage Jaw (LP)	
1984	SUB44	Pop-O-Pies	Joe's Second Record (12-inch EP)	
1984	SUB45	Longshoremen	Grr Huh Yeah (LP)	
1984	SUB46	Frightwig	Cat Farm Faboo (LP)	
1985	SUB47	Rod Myers & The Ramps / The Corvettes	Wheelchair / Maybellene (7-inch single)	
1985	SUB48	Psyclones	Psyclones (LP)	
1985	SUB49	Helios Creed	X-Rated Fairy Tales (LP)	Fundamental Records, Lilith Records
1985	SUB50	Wilma	Wilma (LP)	
1985	SUB51	The Muskrats	Rock Is Dead (LP)	
1985	SUB52	Pop-O-Pies	Joe's Third Record (LP)	
1986	SUB53	Flipper	Public Flipper Limited (2×LP)	Domino Recording Company, Fundamental Records
1986	SUB54	Longshoremen	Walk The Plank (LP)	Eva Records
1986	SUB55	Polkacide	Polkacide (LP)	
1986	SUB56	Controlled Bleeding	Core (LP)	Ultra-Mail Prod.
1987	SUB57	Any Three Initials	Ruins Of America (EP)	MEKA Records
1987	SUB58	The Muskrats	Soul Francisco (EP)	
1987	SUB59	Flipper	Sex Bomb Baby (LP)	Domino Recording Company
1987	SUB60	Low Flying Aircraft	Low Flying Aircraft (LP)	Red Hot Records, Core Records
1988	SUB61	Housecoat Project	Wide Eye Doo Dat (LP)	
1989	SUB62	Helios Creed	Superior Catholic Finger (LP)	Lilith Records
1987	SUB63	Penelope Houston	Birdboys (EP)	Round Tower Records
1989	SUB64	Terminators Of Endearment	Stranger In The Manger (7-inch single)	
1989	SUB65	Various Artists	Devouring Our Roots (LP)	
2010	SUB66	Housecoat Project	Girlfiend (LP)	
1990	SUB67	Controlled Bleeding	Hog Floor (A Fractured View) (LP)	
1989	SUB68	Various Artists	Dry Lungs IV (LP)	
1990	SUB69	Caroliner Rainbow Stewed Angel Skins	I'm Armed With Quarts Of Blood (LP)	
1990	SUB70	Flipper	Some Day / Distant Illusion (7-inch single)	
1992	SUB71	Kathleen Yearwood	Dead Branches Make A Noise (LP)	Voice Of The Turtle Records
1992	SUB72	Various Artists	Dry Lungs V (2×CD)	
1992	SUB74	Angel'in Heavy Syrup	Angel'in Heavy Syrup (CD)	
2008	SUB75	Caroliner Rainbow Susans And Bruisins	The Cooking Stove Beast (CD)	Nuf Sed Records
1996	SUB76	Kathleen Yearwood	Little Misery Birds (EP)	Voice Of The Turtle Records
2001	SUB77	The Lewd	Lewd Conduct In A Public Place! (LP)	
2005	SUB78	Code Of Honor	Complete Studio Recordings 1982-1984 (CD)	

== Roster ==
- Alterboys
- Angel'in Heavy Syrup
- Animal Things
- Any Three Initials
- Arkansaw Man
- Arsenal
- Bay of Pigs
- The Bedlam Rovers
- Caroliner
- Chrome
- Club Foot Orchestra
- Code of Honor
- Controlled Bleeding
- Dead Kennedys
- Factrix
- Flipper
- Fried Abortions
- Frightwig
- Helios Creed
- Housecoat Project
- Penelope Houston
- Inflatable Boy Clams
- The Jars
- Jr. Chemists
- The Leather Nun
- Les Seldoms
- The Lewd
- Bruce Loose
- Low Flying Aircraft
- Minimal Man
- The Muskrats
- Naked City
- Negative Trend
- Nervous Gender
- No Alternative
- Polkacide
- Pop-O-Pies
- Pre-Fix
- Psyclones
- Research Library
- Sick Pleasure
- Society Dog
- Tom Tadlock
- The Terminators of Endearment
- The Tools
- Ultrasheen
- UNS
- VKTMS
- The Wannabe Texans
- Stefan Weisser
- Wilma
- Witch Trials
- Woundz
- Kathleen Yearwood
- Z'ev

== See also ==
- List of record labels
