= Meri St. Mary =

American musician

Meri St. Mary is an American punk poet, chanteuse, musician and artist.

== Career ==
Meri St. Mary was part of the early punk music scene in Hollywood, California. She was involved in many projects, including a Ramones video and the punk film Suburbia as well as television shows (new wave theater) and movies. She also starred in Suicide Line, an underground punk film on 8 mm film, featuring people from the punk scenes of San Francisco and Los Angeles. During the same period she was in two short-lived bands in Hollywood: "Toejam” and "Road Hog". Known in early Hollywood as Meri (wagon) Housecoat, she was photographed by Bruce Kalhberg (and featured in NO magazine). Early influences were live shows by the Screamers, the Weirdos, the Dickies and The Mau Maus: single members became friends, mentors and inspiration in art, music, visuals.

In 1984 San Francisco Meri started the band Housecoat Project with Eric Rad Yuncker, Michel Schorro and Erol Cengiz. until Yuncker died onstage at the Mabuhay Gardens, leaving St. Mary to begin again with a new lineup. Housecoat Project released their first album Wide Eye Doo Dat on Subterranean Records. They also played the New Music Seminar in New York City, at the Pyramid Club on the Lower East Side prior to a US tour. The band disbanded after their second recording in the late 1980s.

In the 1990s, St. Mary started a band called "Sex is A Witch" in San Francisco another short-lived project playing in San Francisco notably a H.E.A.R. show for deaf audience. This show was the first webcast show in history.

In 2007 she resurfaced as an award-winning broadcaster at KVMR in Nevada City with her show The Underground Sound and Hallelujah Hollaback In 2009 she recorded with Lemon de George and produced her first acoustic solo CD “I’m Back”, distributed through Subterranean Records. She began performing again acoustically.

In 2009 a partnership with Monte Cazzaza created the following fourteen years with various projects including the NorCal Noisefest where they coined the phrase "Dueling Theremins". The 1989 Housecoat Project album Girlfriend has been remastered and released on vinyl through Subterranean Records with new artwork (October 2010). Housecoat Project's LPs on Subterranean Records are SUB 61 & SUB 66 catalog numbers.

In 2010, Meri reformed Housecoat Project with the release of "girlFIEND" 12" on Subterranean Records playing Live Shows through 2012.

In September 2012 Meri St. Mary's first book of poetry and art, YOU TORE US was released on Cold River Press.

In September 2012, her song "Time To Die" was used in an independent film Pig Death Machine by Apathy Productions, which screened at Artists' Television Access in San Francisco.

In November 2014, St. Mary's first electronic vinyl EP PROTAGONISTA! (with Th' Mole) was released on Beehive Records, and debuted in Berlin.

In September 2015, the short film NINE DOORS debuted at The Nevada City Film Festival in California. St. Mary wrote, directed, and edited the film in collaboration with Camen Hodges for the song "Nine Doors" in PROTAGONISTA!

In October 2015, St. Mary collaborated with Monte Cazazza for the 20th NorCal Noisefest in Sacramento, playing dueling theremins.

In 2018 Meri and Monte released a 7" vinyl single "Killing Time" and "I Fight Like A Girl" on MSM Music.

Meri continued producing engineering and hosting radio shows, poetry and music until July 2023 when her Longtime Partner Monte Cazazza passed away. Devastated by the loss Meri went into seclusion and is rarely seen.

2024 finds Meri working on Legacy Projects due for release in 2025 and 2027 respectively. She continues to deal with personal health issues and is an advocate for Mental Health.
