= Valencia Street station =

Former railway station in San Francisco, California

Valencia Street
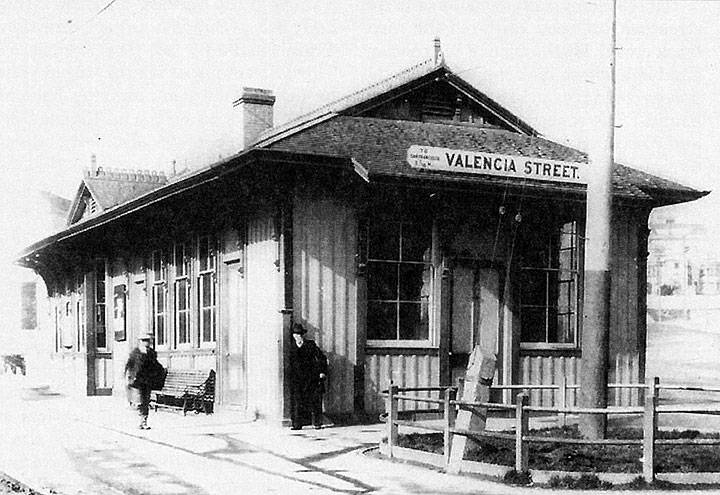

General information
- Location: San Francisco, California
- Coordinates: 37.7503°N 122.4210°W
- Owner: Southern Pacific Railroad
- Line: Ocean View Branch

History
- Opened: 1863
- Closed: 1931

Services
| Preceding station | Southern Pacific Railroad | Following station |
|---|---|---|
| San Francisco Terminus | Ocean View Branch | Bernal toward San Bruno |
| San Jose Depot until c. 1870 Terminus | Ocean View Branch | Bernal toward San Bruno |
| San Francisco Terminus | Peninsula Commute | Bernal toward San Jose |
Location

Valencia Street station was a railway station in San Francisco, California. It was located in the Mission District at 25th and Valencia Streets along the Ocean View Branch. It was the inaugural San Francisco terminal of the San Francisco and San Jose Railroad when the service began in 1863, though it would become a regular stop as the railroad was extended further north, closer to Downtown. The station building was constructed in 1866. Most regular services to Valencia Street ceased in 1903, though it temporarily regained its status as San Francisco's terminal station following the 1906 earthquake and fire. Market Street Railway streetcars additionally called along Valencia Street, offering local connections.

The station building was demolished in 1931, replaced with a loading platform. After passenger operations ended, the commercial district surrounding the station dissolved as riders had made up the majority of the customer base. When Southern Pacific ceased all rail operations along the line, the right of way sold for residential housing.
