= Target Video =

San Francisco-based studio founded by Joe Rees

Target Video, also known as TargetVideo77, is a San Francisco-based film studio, founded by artist Joe Rees, collaborating with Jackie Sharp, Jill Hoffman, Sam Edwards and others. The studio archived early art performance, punk and hardcore bands on video and film. Performers such as the Sex Pistols, the Dead Kennedys, The Screamers, The Weirdos, The Cramps, William S. Burroughs, The Clash, the Avengers, Mark Pauline, Survival Research Labs, The Go-Go's, John Cooper Clarke, Bauhaus, X, The Dils, Johanna Went, Talking Heads, Black Flag, Flipper, D.O.A and Crucifix were recorded in the late 1970s to the early 1980s. In addition, videos often included interviews with members of the bands.

Target Video filmed a performance by The Cramps and The Mutants at Napa State Hospital on June 13, 1978, in which the bands performed for an audience of mental patients. Forty years later, Rolling Stone described the performance as "legendary" and "a landmark moment for punk rock". Despite being attended by only 100 people, mostly patients, the recording of the show became an underground sensation.

Target Video’s first studio was in Oakland, California. That is the location where the famous Screamers videos were shot. That studio burned down the night the Sex Pistols played at Winterland in San Francisco. Target Video moved into San Francisco. The studio was at 678 So. Van Ness. It was “red tagged” by the 1989 Loma Prieta earthquake and taping at that location ceased

== Releases ==
- The Screamers - Live in 1978 in San Francisco
- Dead Kennedys - The Early Years Live (1978–1981)
- The Mutants - Live at the School For The Deaf
- The Cramps - Live At The Napa State Mental Hospital (June 1978)
- Devo - Live 1980
- Iggy Pop - Live in San Francisco 1981
- The Stranglers - Live In 1978 In San Francisco
- Throbbing Gristle - Live In San Francisco At Kezar Stadium
- Chrome / Bauhaus: Live in London - (This compilation video features Bauhaus recorded live at the University of London and 4 of Chrome's film/videos.)
- Sid Terror's Undead (And Now The Screaming Starts... Live at The Mabuhay Gardens, 1978
- The Avengers (Live at the Temple and the Mabuhay Gardens, 1978)
- Crucifix/MDC - Live at the On Broadway, San Francisco, 1983
- The Damned - Live (1978)
- Crime - Live At San Quentin Penitentiary
- Z'EV - 'Six Examples' - 1978-84 including performances from The Mabuhay Gardens, University of London and The Farm
- Black Flag - (1979-1981)

In addition to these releases, there are other re-released compilations (Hardcore Vol. 1–5) featuring bands such as Toxic Reasons, Code of Honor, and Negative Trend.
