= Housecoat Project =

Defunct punk rock band

Housecoat Project was an avant-garde punk rock band started in 1984 in San Francisco, California, by Meri St. Mary, Eric Rad Yuncker, Michel Schorro and Erol Cengiz. The band opened for many punk bands of the time and was a headline act at many clubs.

Housecoat Project was part of the New Music Seminar in New York City, and then toured nationally sponsored in part by Jägermeister Music Tour. The death of Yuncker on stage at Mabuhay Gardens led to a hiatus. St. Mary reformed the band with Jay Crawford on guitar to record Wide Eye Doo Dat in 1988 on Subterranean Records (SUB 61). Housecoat Project's second release on Subterranean Records, Girlfriend (SUB 66), was released 23 years after its recording. The records received critical acclaim and the band was well known for its live performances.

In 2012, St. Mary reunited the band after 20 years with Jay Crawford, Bob Bartosik, Mike Sims and Whitey Cox. Housecoat Project played at the opening of the Punk Rock Museum in Los Angeles, The Eagle in & out of exile with the Sisters of Perpetual Indulgence, the Punk Rock Museum in San Francisco and Nevada City. Wide Eye Doo Dat is out of print and the test pressing for Girlfriend has limited availability. The band's LPs use local artists for the visuals. The Brotherhood of Light was an early supporter, doing light shows at the Mab. Housecoat Project played at the Folsom Street Fair, the I-Beam nightclub, The Farm, The Kommotion, The Chatterbox, San Francisco Music Works, The Baybrick Inn and The Sound of Music as well as open public performances such as 1986 record release in the parking lot of Grocery Outlet South of Market SF: have generator will play.. Robert Christgau of Village Voice gave them a "B". The band is planning more shows in the near future.
