= Third and Townsend Depot =

Former Southern Pacific terminus, San Francisco

San Francisco
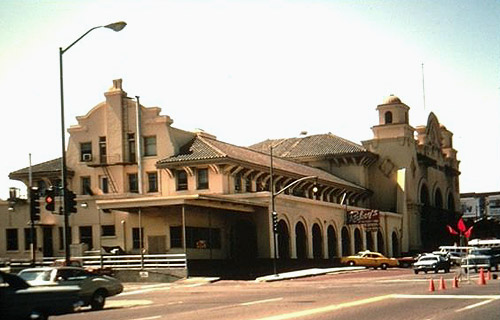
- Southern Pacific's Third and Townsend Depot terminal, August 1974

General information
- Location: San Francisco, California
- Owner: Southern Pacific Railroad
- Line: Coast Line

Construction
- Architectural style: Mission revival

History
- Opened: August 17, 1874
- Closed: 1975
- Rebuilt: 1889; 1915

Services
Preceding station	Southern Pacific Railroad	Following station
Terminus	Coast Line via; Bayshore Cutoff	23rd Street toward Los Angeles
Terminus	Coast Daylight	Palo Alto toward Los Angeles
Terminus	Del Monte	23rd Street toward Monterey
Terminus	Lark	Burlingame toward Los Angeles
Terminus	Peninsula Commute	23rd Street toward San Jose
Terminus	Peninsula Commute	Valencia Street (pre-1907) toward San Jose
Terminus	Ocean View Branch (pre-1928)	Valencia Street toward San Bruno
Terminus	Suntan Special	Burlingame toward Santa Cruz
Location

The Third and Townsend Depot was the main train station in the city of San Francisco for much of the first three quarters of the 20th century. The station at Third Street and Townsend Street served as the northern terminus for Southern Pacific's Peninsula Commute line between San Francisco and San Jose (forerunner of Caltrain) and long-distance trains between San Francisco and Los Angeles via the Southern Pacific's Coast Line. For service for destinations to the north, such as Seattle, and destinations to the east, such as Chicago, passengers generally needed to travel to Oakland, initially on ferries to Oakland Long Wharf, and later on buses to 16th Street Station. It was demolished in the 1970s and replaced by the Caltrain commuter station a block away at 4th and King Street.

== History ==
As the San Francisco and San Jose Railroad was being completed, the company extended the new main line beyond its Valencia and 25th Street station to a new terminal closer to the city's industrial center. Tracks were run down Harrison Street to new combination passenger and freight facilities in the Mission Bay at Brannan between Third and Fourth Streets. The Brannan depot opened on February 14, 1864. Most passenger services were rerouted to terminate down Valencia after a few years, though the Brannan depot continued to handle freight transferred from the waterfront.

Southern Pacific moved the northern terminal of their Peninsula route to the Mission Bay in response to the Tidelands Bill of 1868, which granted the Central Pacific, Southern Pacific, and Western Pacific railroads 150 acres (61 ha) of land in the area on condition they provide a terminal station. The new terminal at the site was on Townsend between Third and Fourth, opening on August 17, 1874. The depot also featured Southern Pacific's freight sheds. The company's corporate offices were additionally on site, and were destroyed in the 1906 San Francisco earthquake. A new passenger station opened at Third and Townsend on April 15, 1889. The San Francisco depot was the designated zero mile of the entire SP system.

The Third and Townsend Depot was built in 1914–15 on the occasion of the Panama–Pacific International Exposition to be held in 1915. The 1889-built station, then becoming known as "The Old Depot", was moved to make way for the new building. Originally the 1914 station was supposed to be temporary, with a main station to be built further downtown; the Southern Pacific had assembled some of the land they would need to extend the line to a terminal at Market Street and Embarcadero, facing the Ferry Building. However, this plan was never carried out, and Third and Townsend served as San Francisco's train station for 62 years.

The depot was the terminus of Southern Pacific's Sunset Limited, running to New Orleans via Los Angeles. The service was cut back to Los Angeles in 1930, reinstated to San Francisco again in 1935, then cut back permanently in 1942.

The station had its last long distance train on April 30, 1971, when the Southern Pacific yielded operation of the Coast Daylight to Amtrak and the Del Monte was discontinued. Amtrak opted to consolidate most of its Bay Area service in Oakland. However, the bus connections between San Francisco and Oakland (and later Emeryville) continued, and are still operated as part of the Amtrak Thruway banner. Peninsula Commute service also continued.

With the rise of freeways and the loss of long-distance passenger rail service, Southern Pacific built the much smaller 4th and King Street station to serve the Peninsula Commute in 1975. Third and Townsend was demolished in 1975–76.

== Description ==
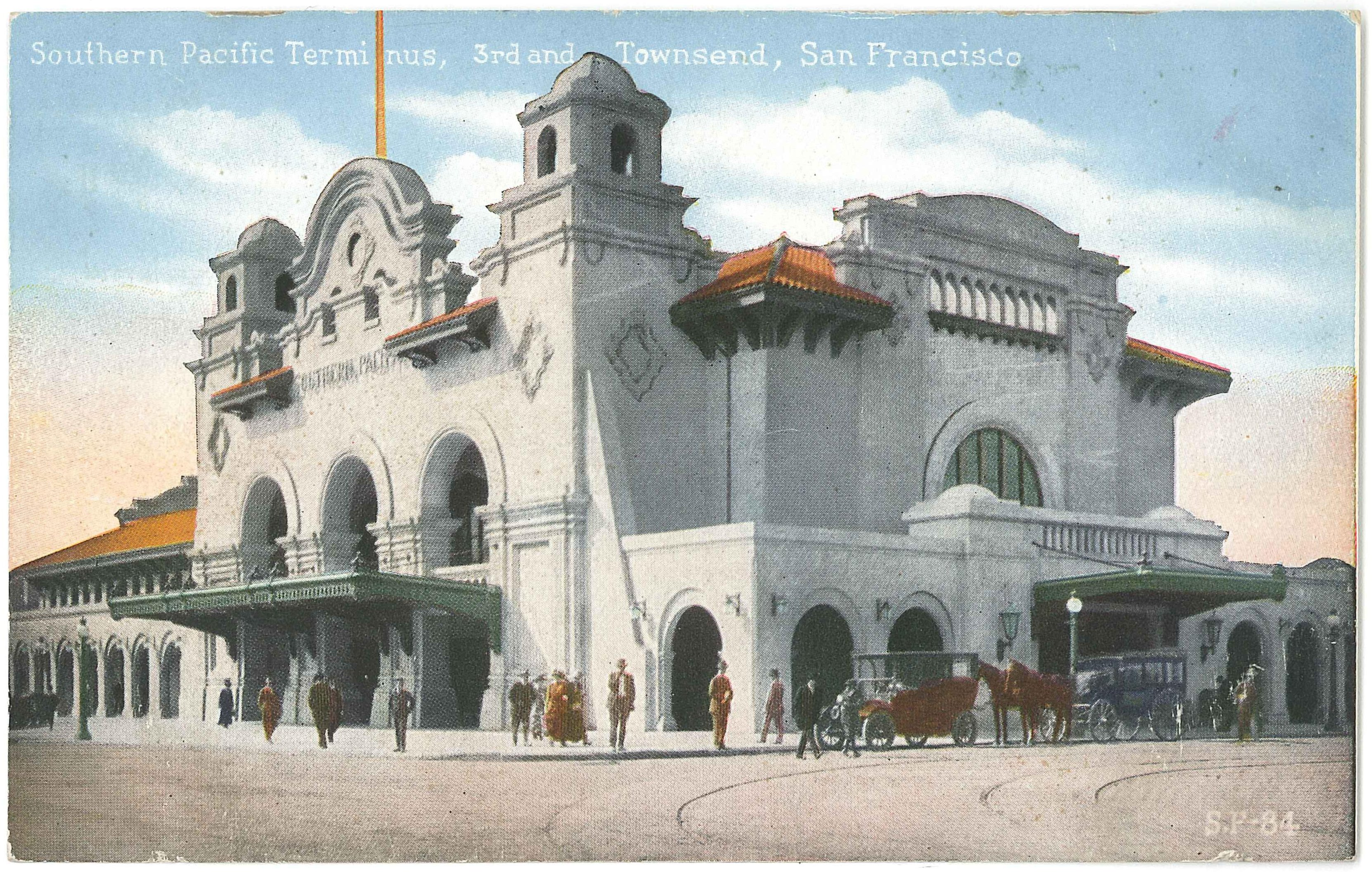
As depicted on a postcard

Designed by the Southern Pacific Architectural Bureau, the station was two stories, built of reinforced concrete in the characteristic Mission Revival architecture style, and was one of the best examples of the style in San Francisco. The railroad intended the style to "link San Francisco more closely with the romance and sentiment of the settlement of California", and planned to include interior murals on that theme. The initial announcement of the design included giving customers a choice of free and paying bathrooms, for the first time in a Western train station. There was a baggage building, a commissary, and a Pullman storeroom. The roofs were tiled and arcades and door canopies sheltered passengers from the weather on two sides. The interiors were finished in oak. The waiting room had a marble floor, measured 64 by 110 feet (20 by 34 m), with a 45-foot (14 m) ceiling, and was lit on three sides by amber-glassed windows.

Local bus and streetcar services were provided by the Market Street Railway and later the San Francisco Municipal Railway.
