= The Jars =

American new wave band

- Genres: Garage rock, new wave
- Years active: 1979–1982
- Labels: Subterranean Records, Universal Records (Berkeley, CA), Sonomonic Records
- Past members: Mik McDow, Gary Nervo, Armin Hammer, Rev. Marc Time, JD Buhl, Michael Montalto

The Jars were a new wave band from Berkeley, California, active from 1978 to 1982. According to Subterranean Records founder Steven Tupper, the Jars were one of the first bands to successfully combine 1960s garage rock and 1970s punk. They recorded two singles and were known for opening for many top punk and new wave bands that appeared in San Francisco during this period.

== Background ==
Marc Time (b. Marc Gunther), Mik McDow (b. Mikkel McDow) and Armin Hammer (b. Gary Hobish) formed The Jars in 1978 with JD Buhl and Gary Nervo (b. Gary Mollica) (ex Pagans Road Manager). The Jars helped spearhead the Berkeley punk/new wave scene by playing at the International Café, Aitos Club, Keystone Berkeley, Berkeley High School and various pizza parlors and frat parties. By 1979 the Jars were playing all over the Bay Area at the Mabuhay Gardens, the Deaf Club, the Temple and the Old Waldorf opening for Roky Erickson, The Angry Samoans, Horslips, The Dickies, The Flaming Groovies, Dead Kennedys, The Suspects, The Mutants, and MX-80. Buhl left the band in 1979.

Despite its ubiquity in San Francisco's early punk scene, the band's recording history was brief. A 7-inch EP was recorded in 1979 for Subterranean Records, “Start Rite Now”, a cover of The Sonics' "Psycho", and "Electric 3rd Rail". In 1980, they recorded a second 7-inch 45, "Time of the Assassins/Jar Wars", and released it on a label run by Universal Records, a Telegraph Avenue record store. It featured a pic sleeve designed by Grammy-winning artist Hugh Brown showing Jack Ruby shooting Lee Harvey Oswald outside Berkeley's Elmwood Theater. Both songs received airplay on local college stations like KALX and performed strongly on the Mabuhay Gardens Rotten Record Chart. Mike Montalto (ex Special Guests, later with Red Meat) then joined on guitar. A live EP recorded at the Old Waldorf and Berkeley Square was planned for 1981 release as a flexi-disc in FLEX!! fanzine, but the magazine folded before release. Sessions at Fantasy Studios for an EP "Teenage Rebellion" took place in 1981, but they went unreleased at the time. Both the Fantasy sessions and the live recordings, along with the 2 singles were released in February 2022 on the album "Make Love Not War."

After the band's dissolution, Marc and Nervo formed the Art Faggots with Ray Farrell (Sonic Youth's former road manager) and Nervo's wife Marge on drums. They later formed Bo with Marc Monosonic and Snoopy. Bo opened for Isocracy, Rancid, The Offspring, Crimpshrine, and Green Day at Berkeley's 924 Gilman Street in the late 1980s.

Former Jars members remain active in music. Marc Time hosts the Sunday Morning Hangover on Eugene, Oregon's KWVA, for which he was honored as the Eugene Weekly's Top Radio Show award. Mik McDow played with Beltain up until he died on February 7, 2019. Armin Hammer was a recording engineer; he owned San Francisco's A. Hammer Mastering & Digital Media and was still active with his band True Margrit until he died in 2023.

In 2014, J.D. Buhl released a new single ("Esmeralda" b/w "You're On My Mind") produced by Gary Hobish (Armin Hammer) with Dow, Michael Montalto and Hammer on guitar, Nervo on organ, Andrew Broadbent on drums and John C. Berry of Psycotic Pineapple on bass. He followed this with several compilation releases including the vinyl issue LITTLE VICTORIES, which included several of the first Jars and Saviors garage recordings, and an album of all-new material (B-SIDES) that included contributions from Hammer, Dow, Montalto, and many others. It was completed and released 2 weeks before J.D. died after a long bout with cancer on August 14, 2017.

In February 2022, The Jars released their first LP, Make Love Not War, combining their singles with 10 previously unheard studio tracks and live performances.

== Discography ==
- The Jars - "Start Rite Now" b/w "Psycho" and "Electric 3rd Rail" (Subterranean Records, 1980)
- The Jars - "Time Of The Assassins" b/w "Jar Wars" (Universal Records, 1981)
- The Jars - "Make Love Not War" LP (Sonomonic Records, 2022)
