= Ocean View Branch =

Railway in California

Map of the Ocean View Branch (blue) and the Bayshore Cutoff

The Ocean View Branch was a railroad line between San Francisco and San Bruno, California. It was in use from 1863 to 1942, with some sections remaining until the 1970s. Its importance as a rail corridor was greatly reduced after the 1907 opening of the flatter and shorter Bayshore Cutoff. The right-of-way between Glen Park and San Bruno was reused for Interstate 280 and Bay Area Rapid Transit.

== History ==
The San Francisco and San Jose Railroad opened south from San Francisco to San Francisquito Creek on October 23, 1863, and to San Jose in January 1864. It ran from a station at Temple (later 25th) and San Jose Street then wound southwest through the San Bruno hills of southern San Francisco. It turned south through Daly City and southeast at Colma, then paralleled El Camino Real through South San Francisco to San Bruno, California. The largest earthworks on the line was the Bernal Cut, which was originally excavated at 2,700 feet (820 m) in length and a depth of 43 feet (13 m). The San Francisco terminal was moved several times in the early history of the service. Initial runs utilized trolley tracks to terminate around 18th and Valencia, near the Pioneer Race Course, though this was cut back to Valencia Street station early on. The line was extended over Harrison Street to a new terminal in the Mission Bay on Brannan Street, which opened on February 14, 1864. By around 1866, trains were again being run up Valencia Street to a new depot at Market Street. A few special steam trains ran down the Market Street Railway from this connection before the practice was forbidden in 1868.

The railroad was not very useful to local residents in San Francisco: high fares discouraged both passengers and freight, and street running in the Mission District made the ride slow. Helper engines were required for the 3% grade at Oceanview in southern San Francisco.

The company was acquired by the Southern Pacific Railroad (SP) in 1868. The northern end of the line was rerouted off of Valencia Street to Harrison, Division, and Townsend streets as the Southern Pacific had been granted land in the Mission Bay for a new terminal, which opened in 1874. In 1878, the SP surveyed an alternate route east of San Bruno Mountain to bypass the line's grades and curves.

Southern Pacific built the Lake Merced branch in 1893 anticipating crowds at a fair the following January — tracks extended from Ocean View station to about 45th and Lincoln. Following the fair, tracks were removed until about Lake Merced, and continued to see oil trains into the 1920s. An additional spur at Ocean View went to Ingleside Race Course. Residents rejected a plan to double-track the railroad around 1900.

The United Railroads opened its San Mateo interurban between San Francisco and San Mateo in 1902. It paralleled the SP for its whole length and ran directly alongside the railroad between South San Francisco and Burlingame. It competed with the railroad for passengers, especially for traffic to the Colma cemeteries for which the SP had numerous flag stops.

On December 8, 1907, the SP opened its Bayshore Cutoff between San Francisco and San Bruno. The new cutoff was straighter and flatter than the old route: it reduced the maximum grade from 3% to 0.3%, the maximum elevation from 292 feet (89 m) to 20 feet (6.1 m), and the San Francisco–San Bruno distance from 13.69 miles (22.03 km) to 11.04 miles (17.77 km). With the cutoff thus saving 20 minutes in running time, most service switched to the new route. The old mainline between though points became the Ocean View Branch, also called the San Bruno Branch or San Bruno line. By 1913, more that two dozen daily round trips used the cutoff, with just 3–4 round trips over the Ocean View Branch. Some service was provided by McKeen Motor Cars. The SP planned to electrify the Ocean View Branch as an extension of the Peninsular Railway to compete with the San Mateo interurban, but never did so.

In June 1919, passenger service over the line was reduced to a single daily round trip. The SP was allowed to temporarily discontinue passenger service on the branch in November 1928 when the Bernal Cut was widened to build San Jose Avenue. This became permanent in March 1930, though freight service continued. Plans were put forward in 1930 to integrate the line into a proposed rapid transit system with much of the route rebuilt as an elevated railway and a new segment north along Capp Street leading to Mission Street. The tracks were abandoned north of Ocean Avenue to 23rd Street on August 10, 1942, and south of Ocean Avenue to at least Daly City after a 1956 excursion train. Tracks had been taken up for scrap metal in World War II. The Southern Freeway (Interstate 280) was constructed partially on the abandoned right-of-way between Glen Park and Daly City in the 1960s. Bay Area Rapid Transit (BART) opened its San Francisco line in 1973, paralleling I-280 between Glen Park and Daly City.

Further southward extensions of BART were proposed to use more of the branch alignment. Freight service on the Daly City–South San Francisco segment ended in 1978. From 1984 to 1988, BART constructed an extension south from Daly City to a new yard at Colma, partially along the former right-of-way. Tracks on Harrison as far as Treat were maintained until about 1990 when the Best Foods plant closed and demand plunged. The Muni Metro J Church light rail line would be extended down San Jose Avenue through the Bernal Cut beginning in 1991. Colma station was added to the BART system in 1996. The 2003-opened extension to San Francisco International Airport and Millbrae was built in a tunnel under the abandoned right-of-way from Colma to San Bruno. Some rails remained in place until construction began on the extension, while other sections had been sold to adjacent cemeteries. The Centennial Way Trail opened in 2008 between South San Francisco station and San Bruno station. It uses the right-of-way of the Ocean View Branch and the parallel interurban. Issues with right of way ownership of freight spurs along Harrison Street persisted into the 2020s.

== Stations ==
Municipality	Station	mi (km)	Services	Opened	Notes
San Francisco	Third and Townsend Depot	0	SP services (formerly); Market Street Railway	April 15, 1889	start of the Bayshore Cutoff
San Francisco	Fourth and Townsend		SP services (formerly)	August 17, 1874	
San Francisco	Fourth and Brannan		San Francisco and San Jose Railroad	February 14, 1864	
San Francisco	Sixth and Brannan		San Francisco and San Jose Railroad; Central (Street) Railroad	June 29, 1864	
San Francisco	18th Street	1.6 (3)			
San Francisco	Valencia Street	2.7 (4)	SP services (formerly); Market Street Railway	1863	
San Francisco	Bernal	4.0 (6)	SP services (formerly)		
San Francisco	Elkton	5.2 (8)	SP services (formerly)		
San Francisco	Rup				
San Francisco	Oceanview	6.3 (10)	SP services (formerly)		
Daly City	Daly City	7.4 (12)	SP services (formerly)		
	Union Park	8.1 (13)	SP services (formerly)		
Colma	Colma	8.5 (14)	SP services (formerly)	October 23, 1863	
Colma	Woodlawn	9.0 (14)	SP services (formerly)		Flag stop, served Woodlawn Memorial Park
Colma	Greenlawn	9.1 (15)	SP services (formerly)		Flag stop, served Greenlawn Memorial Park
Colma	Eternal Home	9.2 (15)	SP services (formerly)		Flag stop, served Eternal Home Cemetery
Colma	Mt. Olivet	9.3 (15)	SP services (formerly)		Flag stop, served Mount Olivet Cemetery
Colma	Sholim	9.4 (15)	SP services (formerly)		Flag stop, served New Salem Cemetery
Colma	Emmanuel	9.7 (16)	SP services (formerly)		Flag stop, served Home of Peace Cemetery
Colma	Cypress Lawn	9.9 (16)	SP services (formerly)		Flag stop, served Cypress Lawn Memorial Park
Colma	Holy Cross	10.3 (17)	SP services (formerly)		served Holy Cross Cemetery
South San Francisco	Baden	11.4 (18)	SP services (formerly); Market Street Railway: 40 San Mateo; South San Francisco Railroad and Power		Railroad Avenue Line runs east to South San Francisco
South San Francisco	Tanforan	13 (21)	SP services (formerly)	c. 1899	
continues south as the Coast Line
