= Minimal Man =

Former American rock music group

- Origin: San Francisco, California, United States
- Genres: Industrial, post-punk, experimental rock
- Years active: 1979–1988
- Labels: Subterranean, LTM, CD Presents
- Past members: Lliam Hart; Patrick Miller; Kristin Oppenheim; Blaise Smith

Minimal Man was an American industrial and experimental rock project, formed in 1979 in San Francisco, California by leader Patrick Miller.

== Background ==
Minimal Man was formed in San Francisco, California in 1979 by leader Patrick Miller, a visual and sound artist who moved to San Francisco in the late 1970s. The band often changed members, featuring at different times members of bands such as Tuxedomoon, Factrix and others active in the then-thriving San Francisco experimental, post-punk and industrial scenes.

Minimal Man remained active in San Francisco recording on the Subterranean Records label until the mid-1980s, after which Miller relocated to Europe, often working with compatriots Tuxedomoon who had made a similar move previously.

The Minimal Man output ceased after the 1980s, and Miller returned to Los Angeles, where he worked as a set dresser.

Miller died at his home in Eagle Rock on December 14, 2003.

== Discography ==
Studio albums

- The Shroud Of (1981)
- Safari (1984)
- Sex with God (1985)
- Slave Lullabyes (1986)
- Hunger Is All She Has Ever Known (1988)
- Pure (1988)

Extended plays

- Sex Teacher (1985)

Single

- "She Was a Visitor"/"He Who Falls" (1980)
- "Two Little Skeletons"/"Tired Death" (1983)
- "Mock Honeymoon" (1987)
