= The Shroud Of =

Studio album by Minimal Man
- Released: 1981
- Genre: Industrial, post-punk
- Label: Subterranean

Minimal Man chronology
The Shroud Of (1981)	Safari (1984)

The Shroud Of is the debut studio album by American industrial act Minimal Man. It was released in 1981, through record label Subterranean.

== Critical reception ==
AllMusic's retrospective review of the album was positive, qualifying it as "murky", "moody" and "aggressive", comparing it to Suicide and Chrome. Trouser Press described the album as "a veritable nightmare in wax".

== Track listing ==
All tracks are written by Patrick Miller.

Side A
No.	Title	Length
1.	"Loneliness"	3:41
2.	"Two People"	2:13
3.	"High Why"	1:59
4.	"Hospital"	2:12
5.	"Blue Step"	2:02
6.	"Hatemonger"	1:27
7.	"The Shroud"	3:13

Side B
No.	Title	Length
1.	"Now I Want It All"	3:42
2.	"The Hex of Sex"	2:00
3.	"You Are"	2:34
4.	"I Don't Resist"	2:04
5.	"Jungle Song"	2:50
6.	"She Was a Visitor"	3:41

== Personnel ==
- Patrick Miller – vocals, synthesizer, electronics, sleeve artwork and cover painting, production on "Two Little Skeletons"
- Andrew Baumer – bass guitar, soprano saxophone
- Lliam Hart – drums

Additional personnel

- Steven Brown – synthesizer on "Jungle Song" and "She Was a Visitor"
- Michael Belfer – guitar on "The Shroud"
- Steve Wymore – bass guitar on "Jungle Song", clarinet on "She Was a Visitor"
- Hitoshi Sasaki – bass guitar on "High Why" and "I Don't Resist"
- Mike Fox – guitar on "You Are"
- Gary Miles – keyboards on "Now I Want It All"
- Stefano Paolillo – drums on "High Why"

Technical

- Pierre Vale – mastering
