= Angel'in Heavy Syrup =

Japanese Rock Band

- Origin: Osaka, Japan
- Genres: Progressive rock, psychedelic rock
- Years active: 1990–2002
- Labels: Subterranean Records Alchemy Records (Japan)
- Members: Itakura Mineko; Nakao Mine; Toda Fusao; Takahara Tomoko
- Past members: Mandrake Yoko

Angel'in Heavy Syrup (エンジェリン・ヘヴィ・シロップ) was a Japanese psychedelic rock band formed in 1990 in Osaka. Emerging from the Japanese noise rock scene, they were influenced by krautrock bands such as Amon Düül II, but drew primarily from psychedelic and progressive rock, resulting in their characteristic ethereal neo-psychedelic sound. After the release of their last album in 2002, the band appears to have fallen into indefinite hiatus status. Alchemy Records (Japan) re-released the band's first three albums as well as a 7" single in 2022 and 2023 as part of the Alchemy Records Essentials Collection. IGN ranked their album III as the 15th best progressive rock album.

== Band members ==
- Itakura Mineko – bass, vocals
- Nakao Mine – guitar
- Toda Fusao – guitar
- Takahara Tomoko – drums

== Discography ==
=== Studio albums ===
- 1991 – Angel'in Heavy Syrup I
- 1993 – Angel'in Heavy Syrup II
- 1995 – Angel'in Heavy Syrup III
- 1999 – Angel'in Heavy Syrup IV

=== Compilation albums ===
- 2002 – The Best of Angel'in Heavy Syrup

=== Reissues ===
- 2022 – ぼくと観光バスに乗ってみませんか / 春爛漫 (Alchemy Records Essential Collection)
- 2022 – Angel'in Heavy Syrup I (Alchemy Records Essential Collection)
- 2023 – Angel'in Heavy Syrup II (Alchemy Records Essential Collection)
- 2023 – Angel'in Heavy Syrup III (Alchemy Records Essential Collection)
