= Nervous Gender =

American electropunk band

- Origin: Los Angeles, California, U.S.
- Genres: Punk rock; electropunk
- Years active: 1978–1988; 1990–1991; 2007–present
- Label: Subterranean
- Members: Edward Stapleton; Matt Comeione
- Past members: Gerardo Velazquez; Phranc; Don Bolles; Paul Roessler; Bill Cline; Sven Pfeiffer; Bruce Moreland; Marc Moreland; Chas Grey; Glenn Daughtery; Ricky "The Spaniard" Sepulveda; John Hawk

Nervous Gender is an American punk rock electronic band formed in Los Angeles in 1978 by Gerardo Velazquez, Edward Stapleton, Phranc and Michael Ochoa.

Their use of heavily distorted keyboards and synthesizers made them, along with the Screamers, one of the original innovators of what is today called "electropunk", although they could equally be considered an early industrial group. The group was confrontational and experimental.

Phranc's androgynous appearance was the embodiment of the group's name, garnered the band much press in zines such as Slash and, later, proved inspirational to founders of the queercore movement. Despite their somewhat high profile, the groups' habit of provoking the audience and obscene material guaranteed they would never gain commercial acceptance. At their first show in 1979, a benefit for the Women's Video Center, Phranc called the audience "pussies" and "dykes" when the band was requested to stop playing.

== History ==
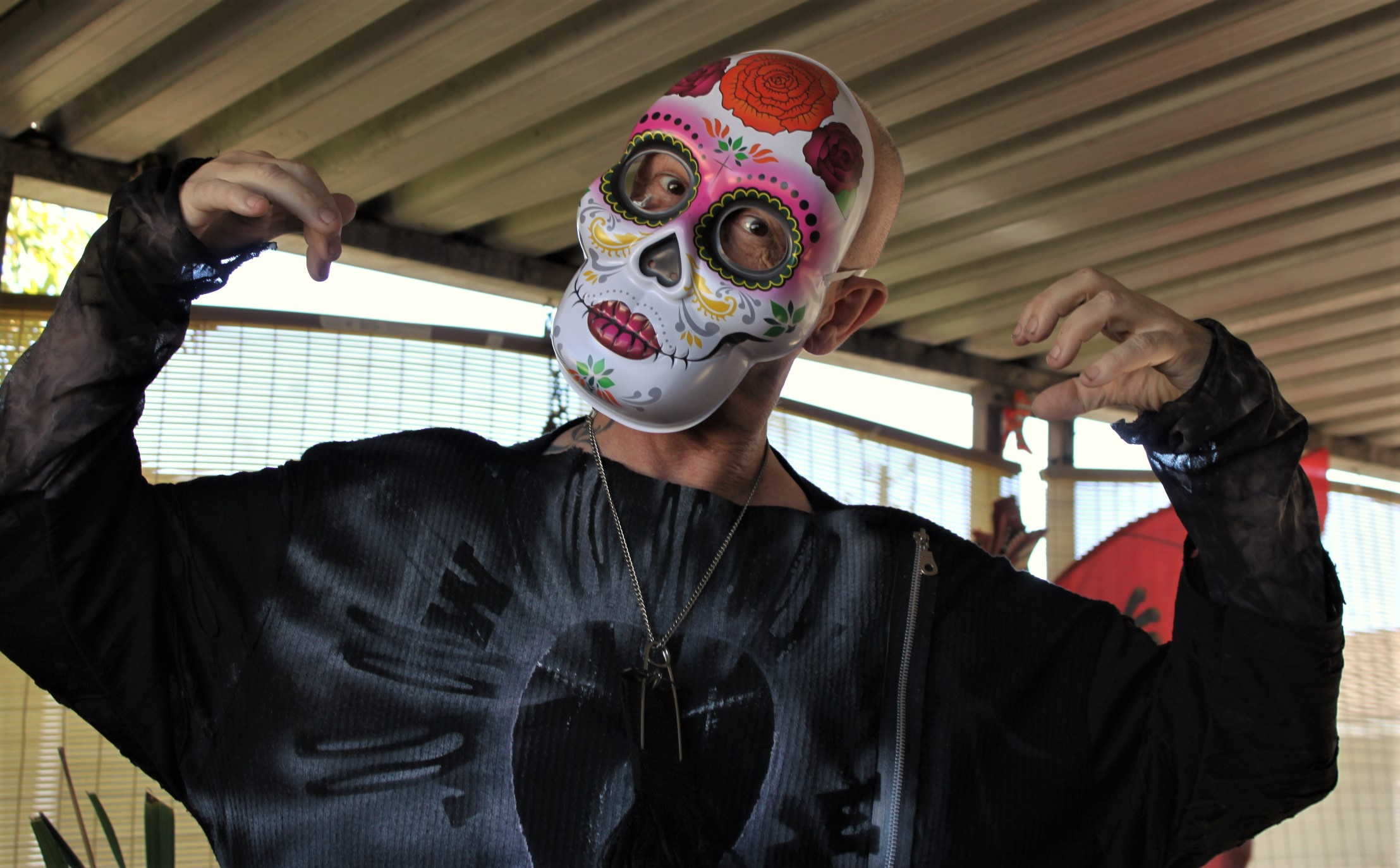
Edward Stapleton wearing a mask

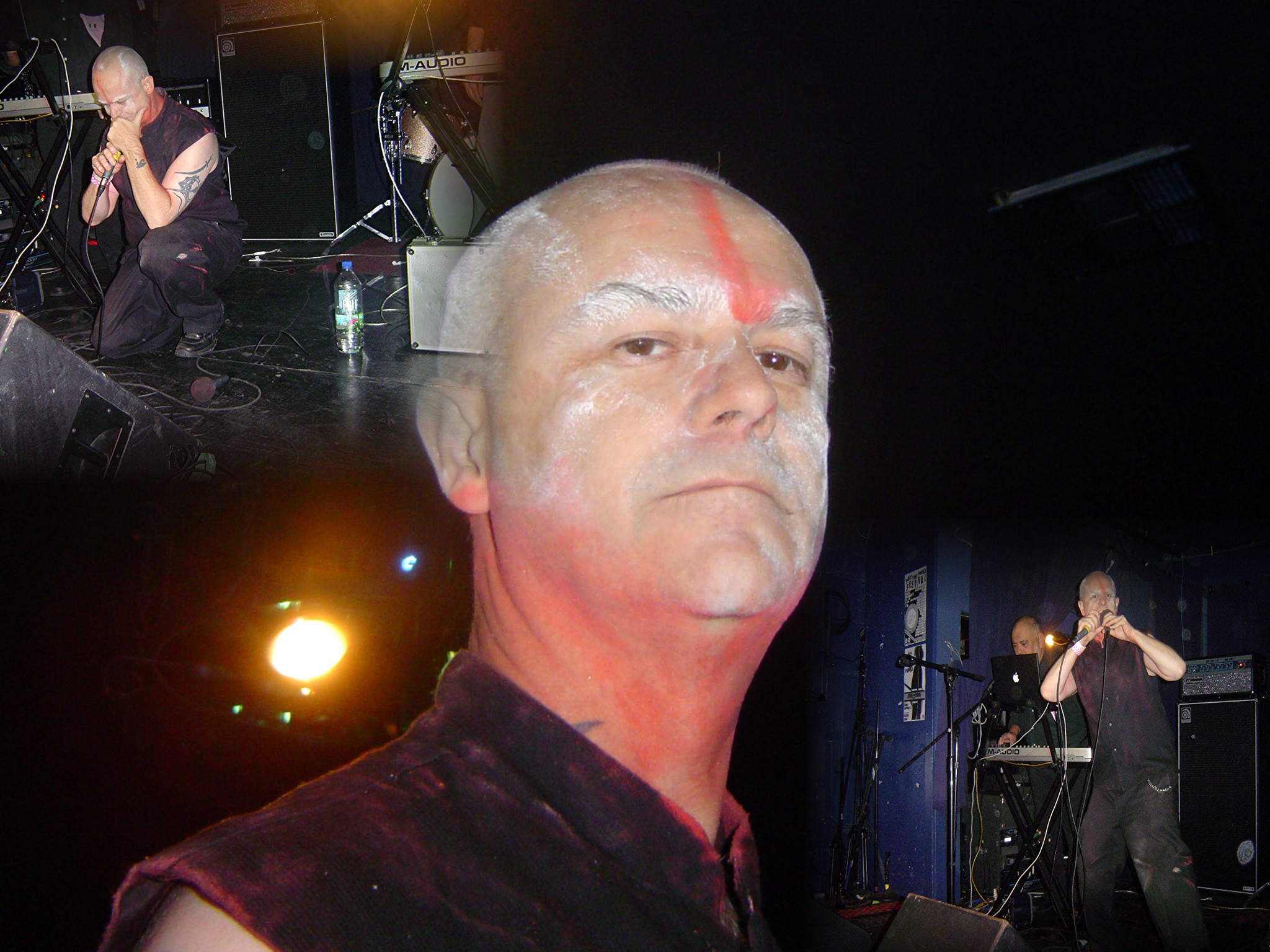
Edward Stapleton

The band were formed in Los Angeles, California, in 1978 by Gerardo Velazquez, Edward Stapleton, Phranc and Michael Ochoa. In 1979, Don Bolles of the Germs joined as drummer. The following year, Phranc left the band and Paul Roessler of the Screamers joined. At this time they recorded the tracks for the compilation Live at Target, released as an LP and a video, both seminal not only in the punk scene but also as early industrial recordings; fellow contributors Factrix and Z'EV (listed on this recording as "Uns") were early industrial acts, and Nervous Gender found more acceptance among that scene initially. All the artists involved in Live at Target were experimenting with atonality, noise and concepts not common until post-punk groups emerged later. Nervous Gender played with bands such as SPK, Factrix, NON, Einstürzende Neubauten, and Psychic TV during the early 1980s.

In 1981 they released their LP Music from Hell, which included guest vocalist Alice Bag from Bags singing on "Alice's Song". Nervous Gender did not record in the studio again. After the LP came out, Paul Roessler moved to New York City to play with the Nina Hagen Band and was replaced by Bill Cline, and Don Bolles left the band to play with 45 Grave. He was replaced by an eight-year-old boy, Sven Pfeiffer. In 1982, Sven was deported alongside his mother and both returned to live in Germany. During their career Nervous Gender was called by one critic, "...a thorn in the side of the L.A. scene...".

During the mid-1980s, the band was on the verge of breaking up when members of Wall of Voodoo Bruce Moreland, Marc Moreland and Chas Grey, who were fans, stepped in and offered to collaborate with them. It was at this point that a guitar-driven version of Nervous Gender emerged. During this time Dinah Cancer of 45 Grave was a frequent guest performer with them, and they played shows with bands such as Christian Death, Super Heroines, Kommunity FK and Gobsheit (a side project of Stapleton's with Patrice Repose) at venues such as the Anti Club. In 1988, Edward Stapleton played his last show with the band.

In early 1990, original members Gerardo Velasquez and Michael Ochoa along with Joe Zinnato (a long time Ochoa collaborator) revived Nervous Gender as a trio. This formation did a series of 8 performances, and were working on what would have been the final Nervous Gender album (working title "American Regime") with producer Paul B. Cutler (of 45 Grave). The final performance of Nervous Gender was on August 26, 1991, at Club A.S.S. in Silver Lake, CA. Gerardo Velasquez died on March 28, 1992, at age 33.

After Gerardo's death, members Ochoa and Zinnato, with the addition of singer Claire Lawrence-Slater (of Honeymoon Killers, Huge Killer Ships), formed "HighHeelTitWig" a punk-industrial-pop-grunge hybrid, which played a series of shows. In 1995 Joe Zinnato suffered a serious stroke which put an end to musical activities.

As of 2005, Edward Stapleton, Michael Ochoa and Joe Zinnato were reviewing all of the Nervous Gender material (studio, live and rehearsal recordings and performance videos) with an eye towards releasing a NG retrospective. At this time, Edward Stapleton (with Karene Stapleton) also recorded under the name Kali's Thugs. In 2007 the band reformed with Stapleton, Ochoa, Zinnato and Tammy Fraser.

As of 2017, Edward Stapleton, and Matt Comeione, San Diego Mod and Cal Arts trained composer started Nervous Gender Reloaded. The duo released the album Milking the Borg in 2021.

2023 saw the release of an expanded reissue of the Music from Hell debut album on 2LP and CD.

== Discography ==
- Live at Target: February 24, 1980 (Subterranean Records 1980, features Nervous Gender, Flipper, Factrix, Uns)
- Music from Hell (Subterranean Records 1981, officially reissued on cassette tape in 2015 and on vinyl, compact disc & digitally in 2023)
- Nervous Gender Archives, series of archival recordings available from Nervous Gender via their web site
  - Nervous Gender Live at the Hong Kong Cafe 1979 (2006)
  - Nervous Gender Live at the Whiskey A Go-Go 1980 (2006)
  - Nervous Gender Live at the Roxy 1986 (2006)
  - Nervous Gender – Music from Hell 2009 Remixed / Remastered (2009) (Limited Edition CD Limited to 250 numbered copies)
- Gestalt / Green Tile Floors (Test Tube Records 2011) 7 inch green vinyl 45 record. 2 songs from 1979 newly recorded for the first time in 2010. Engineered by Paul Roessler of the Screamers and former Nervous Gender member.
- Milking the Borg (2021) by Nervous Gender Reloaded, released digitally and on CDr.

== Music from Hell ==
Music from Hell

Studio album by Nervous Gender
- Released: 1981
- Genre: Electropunk
- Label: Subterranean

Music from Hell is the first studio album by Los Angeles electropunk band Nervous Gender.

Side A (Martyr Complex)

1. Monsters
2. Nothing to Hide
3. Cardinal Newman
4. Fat Cow
5. Alien Point of View
6. People Like You
7. Regress for You

Side B (Beelzebub Youth)

1. Christian Lovers
2. Exorcism
3. Bathroom Sluts
4. Pie on a Ledge
5. Push, Push, Push
6. Alice's Song

Side B is a live performance the band labeled "an electronic bruto-canto dissertation on the banality of spiritual transcendence".

After reissues in 2009 and 2015, the San Francisco-based Dark Entries record label reissued the album in 2023 as a 2LP, CD and digital release (on Bandcamp), expanded with demos and live recordings. All material was recorded between 1979 and 1982.

== See also ==
- List of 1970s punk rock musicians
