= Test Tube Records =

Test Tube Records is an independent record label based in Los Angeles, California. It was started by Chris Trent in 1978. One of the first of the small indie labels to exclusively record and promote underground artists and punk rock music.

== Releases ==
- First release – a 4-song 7" EP by Extremes which featured a four color folded sleeve in a plastic drop bag modeled after Dangerhouse Records releases. A total of 1000 copies were pressed and officially about 50 sold through Bomp! Records mail order distribution.
- Second release – a 2-song 7" single by The Zeros, featuring the tunes "Getting Nowhere Fast" b/w "They Say That (Everything's Alright)". Total pressing was 1000 copies of which 200 were lost when shipped. The pressing sold out in a few weeks and was never repressed.
- Third release - The Atoms 7 inch ep featuring four songs on blue vinyl. Members of The Atoms included Taz Rudd (Symbol Six) and Izzy Stradlin (Guns N' Roses). Never released, about 200 were pressed and surface from time to time having been handed out to friends. Recorded around 1980, pressed in 1992.
- Fourth release - Nervous Gender 7 inch green vinyl. From material written in the late 1970s re-recorded with the current lineup at Geza X's recording studio. Mixed by Paul Roessler (The Screamers). First pressing Fall 2011 of about 500 copies.
- Fifth release - The Checkers - 7 inch blood red vinyl. Local Los Angeles pop/new wave garage combo with several releases on various indy labels. They tear through two songs on their first Test Tube release. Pressed Summer 2012, first run of about 500 records.
