= Sex Bomb Baby =

Compilation album by Flipper

Compilation album by Flipper
- Released: September 8, 1988
- Recorded: 1979–1982, various studios
- Genre: Hardcore punk, noise rock
- Label: Subterranean Records (original release Infinite Zero/American Recordings (1995 reissue); Water Records (2008 reissue); Domino Records (2009 UK & European release)

Professional ratings
Review scores
Source	Rating
AllMusic	4/5 stars
Robert Christgau	A−
The Encyclopedia of Popular Music	4/5 stars
The Rolling Stone Album Guide	4/5 stars
Spin Alternative Record Guide	8/10

Sex Bomb Baby is a compilation album by Flipper. It contains singles, B-sides, and compilation tracks from 1979 to 1982.

== Critical reception ==
Dave Thompson, in Alternative Rock, called Sex Bomb Baby a "crucial round-up of singles and compilation cuts." Likewise, The Rough Guide to Rock considered it an "excellent introduction" to the band, and advised seeking out the original release for its artwork.

== Track listing ==
1. "Sex Bomb" - 5:19
2. "Love Canal" - 3:59
3. "Ha Ha Ha" - 2:19
4. "Sacrifice" (live) - 4:37
5. "Falling" (live) - 5:37 (bonus track on 1995 reissue)
6. "Ever" (live) - 2:42
7. "Get Away" - 2:57
8. "Earthworm" - 3:07
9. "The Game's Got a Price" - 1:59
10. "The Old Lady Who Swallowed the Fly" - 5:31
11. "Brainwash" - 6:45
12. "Lowrider" (live) - 3:22 (bonus track on 1995 reissue)
13. "End of the Game" (live) - 2:40 (bonus track on 1995 reissue)

Notes:

- Tracks 1 & 11 from "Sex Bomb" 7-inch single
- 2 & 3 from "Love Canal" 7-inch single
- 4 from Not So Quiet on the Western Front compilation
- 6 from Eastern Front compilation
- 7 & 10 from "Get Away" 7-inch single
- 8 from SF Underground compilation 7-inch EP
- 9 from a Take It magazine flexidisc
- 5, 12 & 13 from Live at Target compilation (added as bonus tracks on 1995 reissue)

== Personnel (incomplete) ==
- Bruce Loose: vocals on tracks 2,3,4,6,8,9,10,11,12,13; bass on tracks 1,5,7
- Will Shatter: bass on tracks 2,3,4,6,8,9,10,11,12,13; vocals on tracks 1,5,7
- Ted Falconi: guitar on all tracks
- Steve DePace: drums on all tracks
