= Gerardo Velazquez =

Gerardo de Jesús Velázquez (1958 – 28 March 1992) was a visual artist and musician, who was notably a member of the Los Angeles-based punk group Nervous Gender.

== Life and Education ==
Gerardo de Jesús Velázquez was born in Mexico in 1958. His family settled in Los Angeles in his early childhood. He attended Stevenson Middle School in East Los Angeles where he befriended future bandmate Michael Ochoa. Shortly after school, Velazquez and Ochoa met and befriended Edward Stapleton and Phranc. In 1978, the four of them formed Nervous Gender.

After attending Stevenson Middle school, Velazquez received his MFA at California State University, Los Angeles in 1990 after creating his own course study over 15 years in a wide range of disciplines: "literary studies, genetics, human sexuality, visual studies, musicology, digital technology, and religious studies." After his AIDs diagnosis, Velazquez turned to activism with a series of self-published zines such as The Annals of Selective Annihilation: Interplanetary Journal for the Retention of Power Through the Elimination of a Targeted Population (1990) and The Gay Death List: The Magazine of Art and Opportunistic Investments (1990).

Velazquez died in 1992 of AIDS-related complications at age 33. His papers are held at the ONE National Gay & Lesbian Archives.

== Artistry ==
Gerardo Velazquez created art in a multitude of media. A number of his poems such as "Falsetto Boy" were performed for a spoken word album Voices of the Angels. He created painting like "The Neglected Martyr" which spoke to his many academic disciplines incorporating religious iconography into his artwork. Much of his artwork revolved around his band, creating many graphic band flyers, music videos, and synth scores.

Posthumously, his work has been exhibited in such exhibitions as the Axis Mundo: Queer Networks in Chicano L.A. at the Museum of Contemporary Art, Los Angeles in 2017 and the 2023-24 touring exhibition Copy Machine Manifestos: Artists Who Make Zines that travelled to the Brooklyn Museum and the Vancouver Art Gallery.

=== Nervous Gender ===
Velasquez was part of the band Nervous Gender, which he co-founded in October 1978. Original members included Michael Ochoa, Phranc, Edward Stapleton, and Gerardo. Nervous Gender was known for their confrontational and antagonistic performances that involved queer and anti-Catholic in theme. The band still continues to perform, most recently in March 2015.
