= The Mutants (San Francisco band) =

Mutants
- Origin: San Francisco, California, United States
- Genres: Punk rock, art punk, new wave
- Years active: 1977–1986; 2004–present
- Labels: 415, MSI, White Noise
- Members: Brendan Earley, Fritz Fox, John Gullak, Dave Carothers, Peter Conheim, Connie Champagne, Mia D'Bruzzi, Greg Langston
- Past members: Paul Fleming, Charley Hagan, Zippy Pinhead, Ken Kearney, Jim Hrabetin, Albert Reda, Marc Weinstein, Sally Webster, Sue White
- Website: www.sfmutants.com

The Mutants are an American band, notable in the history of San Francisco punk rock and new wave music. They are known for their theatrical performances which often include elaborate props, projections, and comical antics. They are credited with being one of the first "Art-punk" bands in San Francisco, and were one of the most popular bands of the San Francisco punk scene during the late 1970s and early 1980s.

== History ==
The Mutants joined together to perform at the San Francisco Poetry Festival in 1977. They quickly became regular performers in the San Francisco punk rock scene, headlining at the Mabuhay Gardens (aka The Fab Mab), The Savoy Tivoli, The Berkeley Square, The Deaf Club, The Temple (aka 1839 Geary Street), The Old Waldorf, The Warfield, and other punk clubs. They were also noted for being one of the few pop bands to ever perform live at Napa State Hospital, a psychiatric hospital. They also opened for such bands as The Ramones, Iggy Pop, New Order, Lene Lovich, The Cramps and Talking Heads. The Mutants were booked to open for Joy Division's first U.S. tour which was canceled due to Ian Curtis' suicide two days before the tour was to begin.

Their first extended play single was on 415 Records and included "Insect Lounge", "New Drug" and "The New Dark Ages". Many compilations, such as Wave Goodbye, Can You Hear Me: Live From the Deaf Club and 415 Music included both live and studio recordings of The Mutants. In 1982, The Mutants' only album, Fun Terminal, was produced with the help of Snakefinger after the first producer, Paul Wexler, who produced their e. p., left the project and was released on MSI Quality Records.

In 1983 the Mutants appeared in Rick Schmidt's independent film, Emerald Cities. Footage of a live performance was interspersed throughout the film, showcasing four songs: New Dark Ages; We Need A New Drug; War Against Girls; Sofa Song.

Following the release of Fun Terminal, The Mutants embarked on another successful national tour, headlining at major punk venues such as CBGBs and Hurrah. However, the stress encountered while recording Fun Terminal, drug abuse, alcoholism, and family commitments changed the scope of the band. By the mid-eighties many of the original musicians left the band. The three vocalists attempted to keep the band going with new musicians, and new songs were written to feature the female vocalists. An EP documenting the later version of the group was recorded in the studio in 1984, but the material has not been commercially released as of this writing.

In 1989 The Mutants had a reunion show at the DNA Lounge in San Francisco. By this time, most of the band was clean and sober. In 2002, Fun Terminal was re-released as a CD (mastered from a vinyl LP copy, as the master tapes were lost but have since been recovered) on White Noise Records and included three additional tracks of live recordings, a 1980 4 song unreleased demo session and the 415 Records-released EP. Interest in the band re-surfaced and The Mutants began once again playing small clubs in San Francisco, such as SOMA Arts, Thee Parkside, Studio Z and Cafe du Nord. A "Fab Mab Reunion" took place on April 8, 2006 at The Fillmore and featured performances by The Mutants and several other notable bands from the early San Francisco punk scene. Dirk Dirksen and Damon Malloy produced a DVD documentary of The Mutants titled Mutants: Forensic Report which was released in 2007.

== Members ==
Current lineup

- Fritz Fox (aka Freddy Mutant) —vocals
- Brendan Earley — lead guitar
- Connie Champagne — vocals
- Mia D'Bruzzi — vocals
- John Gullak — guitar
- Peter Conheim — bass
- Dave Carothers — drums
- Greg Langston — drums

== Discography ==
- New Dark Ages / New Drug / Insect Lounge 7" (415 Records, 1980)
- 415 Music (415 Records (compilation), 1980)
- Can You Hear Me? Live From the Deaf Club (compilation) (Walking Dead, 1980)
- The Mutants / Half-Japanese flexi-disc (Take It! Magazine, 1981)
- Savoy Sound — Wave Goodbye (compilation) (Go! Records, 1981)
- Live at the Savoy, 1981 (compilation) (CD Presents - BOOTLEG RELEASE, 2010?)
- Fun Terminal LP (Mutiny Shadow, 1981)
- The Mutants / Impatient Youth 7" (Shredder Records, 1988)
- Fun Terminal CD (White Noise, 2004)
- Curse of the Easily Amused LP/CD (Liberation Hall, 2022)

== Films ==
- The Mutants at Napa State (dir. Joe Target Rees, 1978)
- We Were There to Be There (dir. Mike Plante and Jason Willis, 2021)
- The Cramps and the Mutants: The Napa State Tapes (2023)
- Mutants: Opposite World (2023)
