= Caroliner =

US musical group

Background information
- Origin: San Francisco, California, United States
- Genres: Experimental, noise, industrial, bluegrass
- Years active: 1983–present
- Labels: Subterranean Records, 'Nuf Sed, BullsHit
- Members: Unknown

Caroliner is an experimental music group formed in San Francisco in 1983. Described by critics as "industrial-bluegrass," the group uses instruments from bluegrass and rock traditions, as well as homemade electronics and other modified instruments. In their live performances, band members play characters in an other-worldly pageantry, wearing elaborate homemade costumes and performing on a stage decorated with drawings and set pieces, all covered in day-glo paint. The band has toured Europe, Japan, and North America.

== Band membership ==
Caroliner's members are anonymous, but use aliases (Obsidian Skeleton, The Sickwood Adventure, and Cottypearile Weddingforke). The aliases are only used by them during interviews with the band; no credits appear on any Caroliner records. In her autobiography, cartoonist Dame Darcy writes about her membership in the band in the late 1980s/early 1990s.

== Band name ==
The Caroliner band name changes from album to album, and tour to tour. For instance, the band's name on their 1990 album I'm Armed With Quarts of Blood is Caroliner Rainbow Stewed Angel Skins, whereas on 1995's Sell Heal Holler the band is called Caroliner Rainbow Customary Relaxation Of The Shale. The reason for this is unknown but could be connected to personnel changes within the band.

When referring to the band as a whole, the Caroliner name stands alone (rather than the oft-used 'Caroliner Rainbow').

== Press ==
Jamie Rake, in Sound Choice, described Caroliner's music as follows:

"Caroliner is the sound of atrophy, the noise of salvation and damnation's collision in a parallel dimension to purgatory, the random rumbling of the bowels of the universe turned inside out to become a semblance of music complete with lyrical vantage points so convolutedly arcane to make comprehending them impossible, save for the few gnostically inclined aspirants bent in similar psychic permutations."

Alex Ross of The New Yorker noted:

"On top of the visual extravagance, Caroliner has somehow forged an original musical style. The songs typically fuse together a grinding, relentless bass line, country-ish banjo strummings, spastic vocals ranging across several octaves, a wheezing organ drone, and screeching violin tremolos. Despite the splintered aesthetic, a lumbering grandeur gathers ...... Space does not permit a description of the lyrics, which purport to interpret the prophecies of a 19th-century Wisconsin cow."

In May, 2011, the band received notice on the Fox network cable program "Red Eye," where the host, Greg Gutfeld, lauded the group's work (between 9 and 13 minutes into the clip cited), calling it "brilliant" and "violently obscure."

Carlo McCormick in Reflex issue 3 said his copy of "Hernia Milkqueen 'The Rear End Hernia Puppet Show'" came with a "ripped poster for the band's show at the Kennel Club; a dingy piece of Christmas wrapping; a Maxwell video cassette record-the-action sticker that presumes the 49'ers make it to the '88 Superbowl (which they never did); some painterly gesture on paper that must've been art; a hideous thrift-shop bracelet; a few xerox pages of obscure press clippings and cryptic, hallucinatory stream-of-coniuosness interviews; a half dozen pages torn out of a book called "The Strange Ways of God"; pages 342 and 348 from an anonymous porn novel; more art, bits of stained tissue; and a lyrics page almost as ill as it is illegible." McCormick says "...if dead cockroaches could rock, Caroliner Rainbow is what they'd sound like."

== Discography ==
To date the band has released 13 full-length albums. Their first two albums were released and/or distributed by Subterranean Records. The following five albums were released by Nuf Sed. Since 1995, all of Caroliner's albums have been self-released by BullsHit. Caroliner's music has also appeared on various 7" singles, EPs, split releases, and compilations.

Caroliner's album covers are assembled by hand. Drawings and calligraphy are screen-printed or photocopied onto various materials, which are then glued onto a makeshift record sleeve. Sleeve materials vary (two copies of the same record will seldom be identical), and have included fabric, diaper disposal bags, old record sleeves (spray-painted beyond recognition) and pizza boxes.

Studio albums

- (1985) Caroliner Rainbow Hernia Milk Queen - "Rear End Hernia Puppet Show" (Subterranean Records)
- (1990) Caroliner Rainbow Stewed Angel Skins - "I'm Armed With Quarts of Blood" (Subterranean Records)
- (1991) Caroliner Rainbow Open Wound Chorale - "Rise of the Common Woodpile" (Nuf Sed)
- (1992) Caroliner Rainbow Susans and Bruisins - "The Cooking Stove Beast" (Nuf Sed)
- (1992) Caroliner Rainbow Wire Thin Sheep Legs Baking Exhibit - "Strike Them Hard - Drag Them to Church" (Nuf Sed)
- (1992) Caroliner Rainbow Fingers of the Underworld & Their Unbreakable Bones - "The Sabre Waving Saracen Wall" (Nuf Sed)
- (1994) Caroliner Rainbow Scrambled Egg Taken For a Wife - "Banknotes, Dreams and Signatures" (Nuf Sed)
- (1994) Caroliner Rainbow Grace Blocks Used in the Placement of the Personality - "Rings on the Awkward Shadow" [double LP] (BullsHit)
- (1995) Caroliner Rainbow Customary Relaxation of the Shale - "Sell Heal Holler" (BullsHit)
- (1996) Caroliner Singing Bull of The 1800 Memorial Band "Our American Heritage, Vol. 1"'' [live recordings] (BullsHit)
- (1998) Caroliner Rainbow Stand Still or Fight Beans and Sunstroke - "Lower Intestinal Clocks b/w Gut" (7" as a 12") (BullsHit)
- (1999) Caroliner -"Toodoos" (BullsHit)
- (2003) Caroliner Rainbow Brain Tool Imbued With Rust And Mold - "Wine Can't Do It, Wife Won't Do!"[double LP] (BullsHit)
- (2004) Caroliner - "An 1800s Affectuant In Instrumental Revue" (BullsHit)
- (2005) Caroliner Rainbow Solid Handshake & Loose 2 Pins "Transcontinental Pinecone Collector" (BullsHit)
- (2007) Caroliner Rainbow Snake Tailed Waxwalker / Caroliner Rainbow Cannon And Church Mister "Smoke Tour For Lunation" (7"as a 12"/Woodpatty Chickenclimber) (BullsHit)

7" Singles

- (1993) Caroliner - "Bead Trail to Jardunne" b/w "The Cooking Stove Beast" (Nuf Sed)
- (1993) Caroliner - "Legs Go, Mind Goes, Lungs Go" b/w "The Ballad of Hamdrags" (live) / River Wearing Children Limbs" (instrumental) (Vertical Records)
- (1994) (split) Caroliner Rainbow Tongue On The Fingermill of the Paste Demon - "Wrap Your Rattler, Bring Your Coat" or "The Bringing of Electricity to Monclova County" b/w Eeyore Ass Guzzler (a.k.a. Eeyore Power Tool) - "Broken Fence of the Battered and Buried"
- (1995)) (split) Caroliner / Culturcide (Birdman)
- (199?) (split) Caroliner Rainbow Gumcuppers - "Fixing and Mixing Cracked Skulls" b/w Commode Minstrels in Bullface - "Theme From the Destruction of the Turd Man" (P Tapes)
