= Valencia Street =

Thoroughfare in San Francisco, California

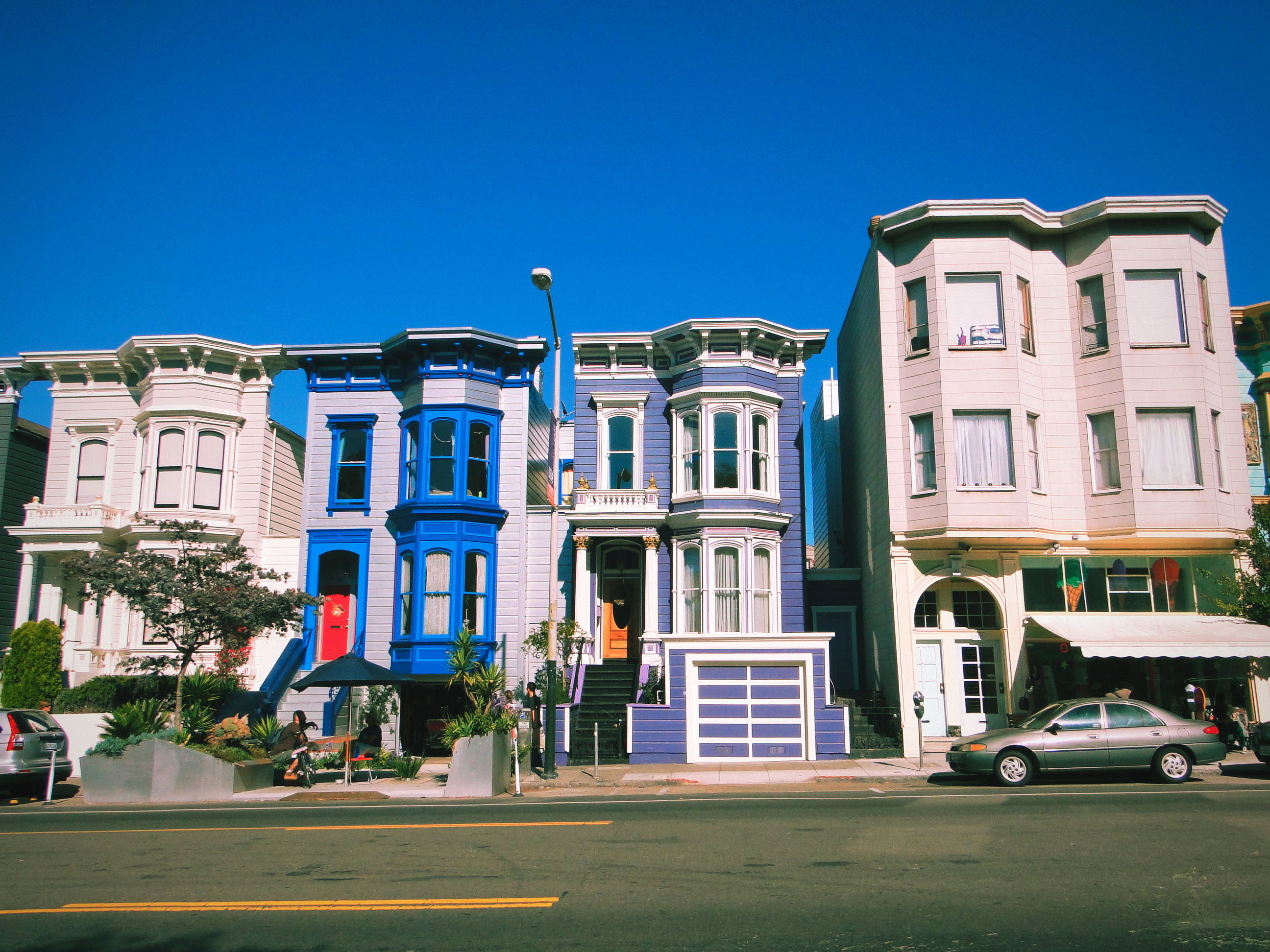
Houses lining Valencia Street, 2012

Valencia Street is a major thoroughfare in San Francisco, California. It begins at Market Street near the foot of Hayes Valley, and passes through the Mission District before ending at an intersection with Mission Street in Bernal Heights. Valencia Street is the historical boundary of several neighborhoods. The street is named after the Valencia family, who were early Mexican settlers in California.

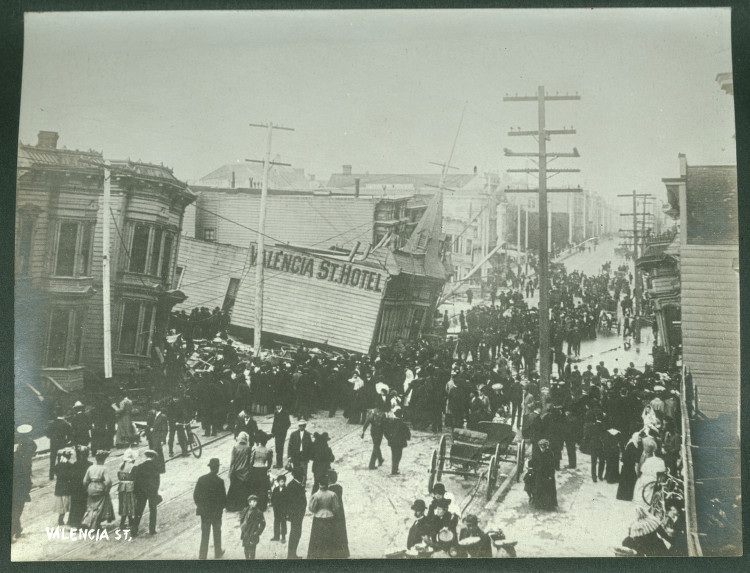
The Valencia Street Hotel collapsed into the roadway in the aftermath of the 1906 San Francisco Earthquake

The original Market Street Railroad was run down Valencia Street to the San Francisco and San Jose Railroad depot with service beginning in 1860. Cables were installed in the roadway for haulage in 1883. The line's operations were so closely tied to those on Market Street that installing streetcar electrification along Valencia was deemed as unnecessary unless Market Street could be similarly electrified (overhead wires had been banned along Market some years before electrification had been undertaken citywide). The roadway was heavily damaged during the 1906 San Francisco Earthquake. Electric trolley service began on October 1, over five months after the disaster. Streetcar service ended on January 15, 1949 and was not replaced with buses, leaving the street devoid of public transit along its length.

In the 1990s, the San Francisco Bicycle Coalition had successfully campaigned to have the median divider on Valencia Street removed to make way for cyclist facilities. Subsequently, the city has sought to further improve bicycle access along the thoroughfare. Lane widths were reduced, bike lanes installed, and sidewalks widened in 1999 as part of a road diet. The median between 15th and 19th was further removed in the early 2000s and the roadway reconfigured with bike lanes. Attempts have been ongoing to facilitate bicycle travel while also appeasing the desires of merchants. A pilot program with center-running bike lanes debuted on August 1, 2023. This setup was met with largely negative response. It was replaced with more conventional side-running bike lanes beginning in February 2025.

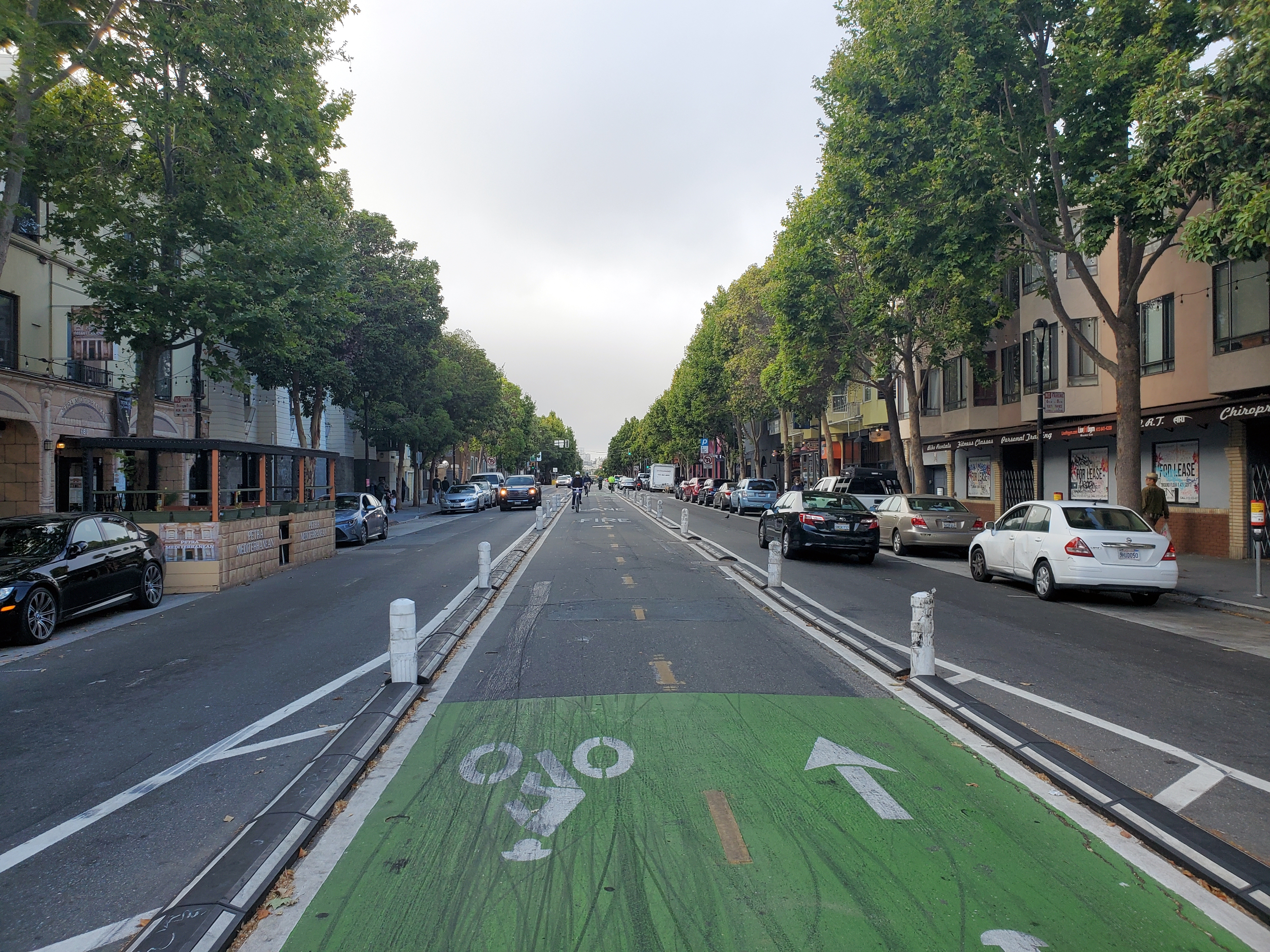
The center running bike lane on Valencia, looking north from 18th Street, seen in August 2024
