= Monte Cazazza =

American artist and composer (1949–2023)

- Born: January 23, 1949
- Died: June 28, 2023 (aged 74)
- Years active: 1979–2023
- Label: Industrial Records
- Formerly of: Throbbing Gristle; Psychic TV; Factrix
- Website: brainwashed.com/tg/monte.html

Monte Cazazza (January 23, 1949 – June 28, 2023) was an American artist and composer best known for his seminal role in helping shape industrial music through recordings with the London-based Industrial Records in the mid-1970s.

== Career ==
Cazazza, based primarily in San Francisco during his early career, is credited with coining the phrase "Industrial Music for Industrial People". This was later used to encapsulate the Industrial Records label and the artists representing it. Later, the noise collages and experimental sound manipulation coming out of Industrial Records came to be known as industrial music. Cazazza had built up an underground reputation as a particularly volatile performer with a potentially dangerous and antisocial aesthetic. Re/Search Magazine's Industrial Culture Handbook described his work as "insanity-outbreaks thinly disguised as art events." The Futurist Sintesi show near the end of 1975 was heralded on a promo flier as "Sex - religious show; giant statue of Jesus got chainsawed and gang raped into oblivion".

Cazazza did not limit his "performances" to the familiar dynamic of stage, audience, and audience reaction. Much of his work involved acts designed for maximum shock value. While a student at the Oakland campus of the California College of Arts and Crafts, Cazazza created a cement waterfall that disabled the main stairway of the building for his first sculpture assignment. He was expelled shortly afterwards. As a statement piece he once created a 15'x15' screw-together metal swastika and was known to visit his friends with a dead cat and formaldehyde that he would use to set the cat alight.

Much of his early work is considered obscene and virtually impossible to find. He worked with both print and sound collage, film, performance, and presentation. He was also heavily involved in the Mail art movement of the mid-1970s to early 1980s. Some of his early output was collected and released by The Grey Area of Mute in 1992 on the album, The Worst of Monte Cazazza.

Cazazza worked frequently with Factrix, an early industrial and experimental group from San Francisco, and recorded soundtracks for Mark Pauline and Survival Research Laboratories. His later work included co-creating the independent distribution and film company MMFilms with Michelle Handelman and various soundtrack recordings. Cazazza collaborated with Chthonic Force on a track related to the Columbine High School massacre, which was released on the band's "best of" collection in 2020.

Cazazza sent out photos of himself in an electric chair on the day of convicted murderer Gary Gilmore's execution. One of these was mistakenly printed in a Hong Kong newspaper as the real execution. Cazazza was also photographed alongside COUM Transmissions/Throbbing Gristle members Genesis P-Orridge and Cosey Fanni Tutti for the "Gary Gilmore Memorial Society" postcard, in which the three artists posed blindfolded and tied to chairs with actual loaded guns pointed at them to depict Gilmore's execution.

Monte spent the last 14 years of his life with partner/collaborator and artist Meri St. Mary. They produced numerous projects in various stages of development including radio, photography, books, film and live shows that coined the title "Dueling Theremins". Meri is keeping Monte's legacy alive by featuring his work exclusively upcoming in 2025 and 2027.

Cazazza died on June 28, 2023.

== Discography ==
=== Solo ===
- To Mom On Mother's Day (7") (Industrial Records) (1979)
- At Leeds Fan Club/Scala, London/Oundle School (Cass) (Industrial Records) (1980)
- Something for Nobody (7") (Industrial Records) (1980)
- Stairway To Hell/Sex Is No Emergency (7") (Sordide Sentimental) (1982)
- The Worst of Monte Cazazza (CD) (The Grey Area) (1992)
- Kill Yur Self (12") (Telepathic Recordings) (1996)
- Power Versus Wisdom, Live (CD) (Side Effects) (1996)
- The Cynic (CD) (Blast First Petite) (2010)

=== with Factrix ===
- California Babylon (LP) (Subterranean Records) (1982)

=== with Chaos Of The Night ===
- Live At KFJC (CD) (Endorphine Factory)

=== with Psychic TV ===
- Dreams Less Sweet (LP) (CBS) (1983)
- Godstar (12") (Temple Records) (1985)
- Mouth Of The Night (LP) (Temple Records) (1985)
- Themes 3 (LP) (Temple Records) (1986)
- Live In Heaven (LP) (Temple Records) (1987)
- Allegory and Self (LP) (Temple Records) (1988)
- A Real Swedish Live Show (LP) (Thee Temple Ov Psychick Youth Scandinavia) (1989)
- Live in Glasgow Plus (CD) (Temple Records) (2003)
- Godstar: Thee Director's Cut (CD) (Temple Records) (2004)

=== with The Atom Smashers ===
- First Strike (LP) (Pathfinder Records) (1986)

=== with The Love Force ===
- "Climax", "Six Eyes From Hell", and "Liars (Feed Those Christians To The Lions)" on the album The Worst Of Monte Cazazza (CD) (The Grey Area) (1992)

=== with Esperik Glare ===
- "A City in the Sea" on the 7" As the Insects Swarm (7") (Static Hum Records) (2008) with Charlie Martineau

=== with Meri St. Mary ===
- "Killing Time" and "I Fight Like A Girl" (7") vinyl 45 2018 c.MSM Music
