= Dirk Dirksen =

German music promoter (1937–2006)

- Born: August 25, 1937; Braunschweig, Germany
- Died: November 20, 2006 (aged 69); San Francisco, California, U.S.
- Education: San Jose State University (Dropped out)
- Occupations: Punk and New Wave promoter
- Family: Everett Dirksen (great-great granduncle)

Dirk B. G. Dirksen (25 August 1937 – November 20, 2006) was a German-American music promoter and emcee of the San Francisco punk rock clubs Mabuhay Gardens and On Broadway in the late 1970s and early 1980s.

== Early Life ==
Dirksen was born on 25 August 1937 in Braunschweig, Germany. He was a great-great grandnephew of United States Senator Everett Dirksen. After the end of World War II, Dirksen and his family would immigrate from Germany to Downey, California where he would spend the rest of his childhood. Dirksen served in the Army, briefly attended San Jose State University, and entered the entertainment business in the late 1950s, hosting a live television show called Rocket to Stardom.

== Career ==
Dirksen worked as a tour manager for several 1960s rock and soul acts including Ray Charles, Iron Butterfly, and the Supremes. In 1974, he began to book acts at the Mabuhay Gardens in San Francisco's North Beach, and began booking local punk acts (The Nuns, The Sheets, Crime, Mary Monday, etc.) along with soon-to-be-famous national and international talent, such as Blondie, The Ramones, Devo, Black Flag, and The Dead Kennedys. From 1979 to 1982, he wrote and directed Amapola Presents Show, a weekly magazine–variety show on KEMO-TV, Channel 20. The show starred Filipina superstar Amapola with co-host Ness Aquino—Mabuhay Gardens' owner. Amapola Presents Show became Dirk Dirksen's showcase for local punk acts, local Bay Area bands and artists, and a group of Bay Area actors called "The Straight People." Dirksen gained some negative notoriety for allegedly ripping off SoCal punk rock bands Youth Brigade and Social Distortion while on their independent summer 1982 tour, and further taunting them by giving them rolls of pennies, as documented in the documentary Another State of Mind.

After leaving the Mabuhay Gardens, he operated the On Broadway nightclub just upstairs from the Mabuhay. When the On Broadway was closed in 1984, Dirksen went into video production with his firm, Dirksen-Molloy Productions, which he owned with his domestic partner Damon Molloy.

Dirksen was also active with the organization H.E.A.R. (Hearing Education and Awareness for Rockers).

In April 2006, he hosted a Mabuhay reunion event at the Fillmore Auditorium, featuring members of the Dead Kennedys, The Mutants, Flipper, and The Contractions.

== Death and legacy ==
He died in his sleep on November 20, 2006 of an apparent heart attack at age 69.

On November 12, 2008, an official measure was passed to rename Rowland Alley — on Broadway between Kearney and Montgomery — for him. In 2009, along with a street sign reading "Dirk Dirksen Place," a plaque was placed at 433 Broadway, the former site of the Mabuhay Gardens nightclub Dirksen once managed.
