= Kathleen Yearwood =

Canadian experimental singer-songwriter and author

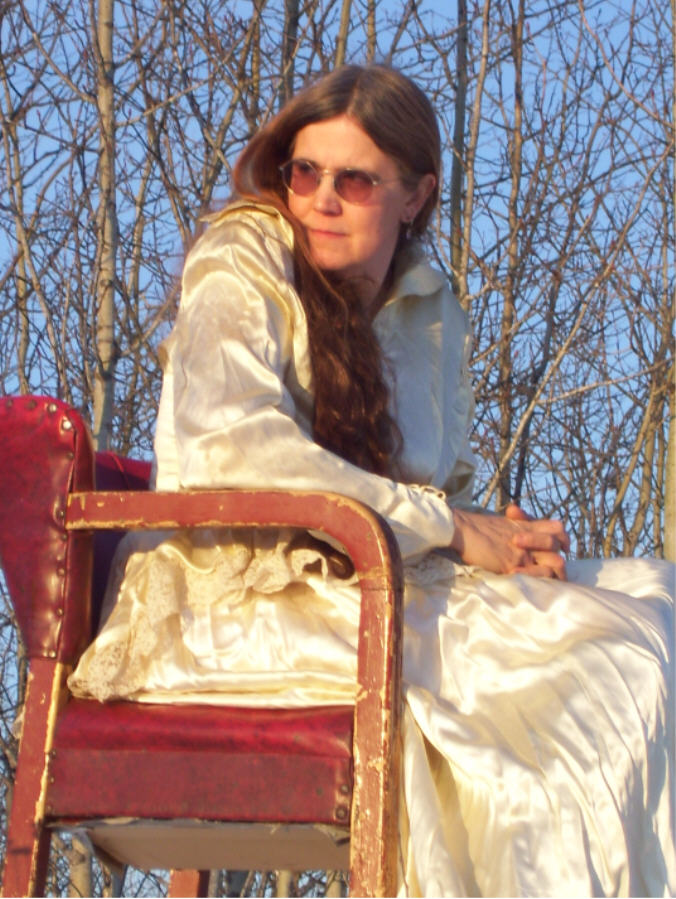

Background information
- Born: 1958 (age 67–68)
- Origin: Calgary, Alberta, Canada
- Occupations: Singer-songwriter, author

Kathleen Yearwood is a Canadian experimental singer-songwriter and author, born in 1958.

From Subterranean Records description of Kathleen Yearwood:

This powerful and very radical Canadian artist and her music have been described variously as a "folk banshee," "Joan Baez meets Diamanda Galás," and "when angels and demons collide," among many other superlatives, but the descriptions tend to fall flat before the real thing.

In a 1993 interview with the Calgary, Alberta newspaper VOX, Yearwood notes that "what I have for sale are songs about spirit in a culture that denies anything spiritual." She believes that her life and her art have been shaped by familial abuse, poverty, sexism, battering, and the corruption and materialism of the Canadian society in which she grew up. She has contributed for many years to the Prison justice movement in Canada.

== Music ==
Yearwood was 12 years old when she began singing professionally in Calgary, Alberta. She worked as musician in Vancouver, British Columbia in her early 20s, and lived as well in Montreal, where she studied experimental music and tape composition at McGill University. Moving westward again, she ended up in rural Alberta, in the vicinity of Edmonton, where she assembled a band called Cheval de Guerre in the late 1980s.

She has performed throughout Canada and in Europe, playing shows at the Vancouver Folk Music Festival (1998) and the Under the Volcano Festival in 2003. She has also performed at Victoriaville Festival of New Music (FIMAV) in Victoriaville, Quebec in 1999, and the Sergey Kuryokhin Festival of New Music (SKIF) in St. Petersburg, Russia in 2004 as well as the Fano Free Folk festival in Denmark in 2018

On her album "Little Misery Birds", Yearwood set three William Blake poems to music.

== Writing ==
Yearwood has published several short stories and two novels. "Self-Mutilation" was published by the University of Oslo in 2003. She describes Self Mutilation as a book about "the spiritual cost of poverty". The work contains some of the "folklore" collected in Canadian Prisons. The book was again published in the US by Dumpster Fire Press, et al. | Jun 30 2022 Dumpster Fire Press then published her second novel "Suspicion" Apr 3 2023 She illustrated Rune Kjaer Rasmussens dual-language book "Muldvarpens privatliv / The private life of the mole" in 2024

== Discography ==
- Apokalypsis (2026)
- Yes, You Were Born to Die (2025)
- Folk Songs (2021)
- REQUIEM World in Ashes (2020)
- This Guitar Is Wrecked Part 2 (2017)
- This Guitar Is Wrecked Part 1 (2017)
- Hunt the Circle (2013)
- À la Claire Fantöme (2013)
- Great Songs to Empty Rooms (2005)
- Ordeal (2003)
- Dog Logic (2000)
- Little Misery Birds (1995) Subterranean Records / Voice of the Turtle
- Book of Hate (1994) Subterranean Records / Voice of the Turtle / Amatish
- Universal Incest b/w Fille D'un Laboureaux EP -, (7" Coloured Vinyl) (1991)
- Dead Branches Make a Noise (cassette) (1990) Subterranean Records
- Housework (cassette) (1989)
- Panik And Death (cassette 1988)

== Bibliography ==
- Self-Mutilation – University of Oslo, (2003) (ISBN 82-7100-133-7)
- Self-Mutilation- Dumpster Fire press USA (ISBN 979-8839034037)
- Suspicion- Dumpster Fire Press (ISBN 979-8389973800)
