= San Francisco and San Jose Railroad =

Pioneer shortline railroad from San Francisco to San Jose (1860-1870)

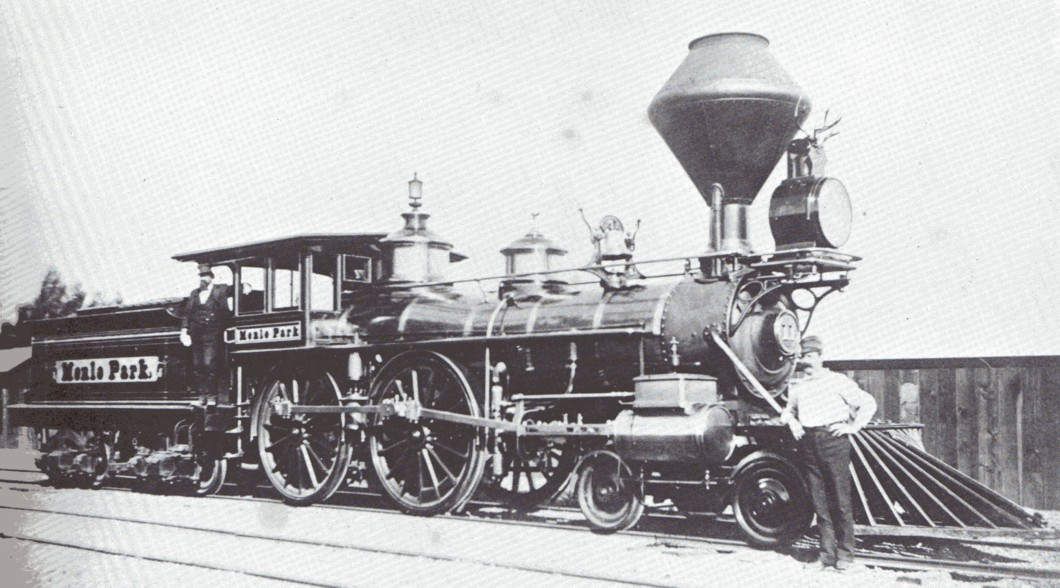
- Locomotive #11 of the SF&SJ

Overview
- Headquarters: San Francisco, California
- Locale: San Francisco Peninsula; Santa Clara Valley
- Dates of operation: 1863–1870
- Successor: Southern Pacific; Caltrain

Technical
- Track gauge: 4 ft 8 1/2 in (1,435 mm) standard gauge

The San Francisco and San Jose Railroad (SF&SJ) was a railroad which linked the communities of San Francisco and San Jose, California, running the length of the San Francisco Peninsula. The company incorporated in 1860 and was one of the first railroads to employ Chinese laborers in its construction. It opened the first portion of its route in 1863, completing the entire 49.5-mile (80 km) route in 1864. The company was consolidated with the Southern Pacific Railroad in 1870. Today, Caltrain and the Union Pacific Railroad continue to operate trains over part of the company's original route.

== History ==
The Pacific and Atlantic Railroad Company (P&A) was founded on September 6, 1851, with the goal of building a railroad between San Francisco and San Jose. The route was surveyed and published by the end of 1851, but the P&A was unable to raise funds locally; when the P&A turned to banking houses in New York and England, they were told that no funds could be disbursed without first obtaining local capital. The company reorganized on October 29, 1853, just before the expiration of the construction permit, and US$2,000,000 (equivalent to $77,400,000 in 2025) of stock was drawn up for sale, but an untimely downturn in the economy meant no investors were forthcoming.

Public sentiment again turned to the idea of constructing a railroad in 1857–58 and a new San Francisco and San Jose Railroad Company was incorporated in late 1859 with the idea to raise public funds by putting a referendum to the voters of the three counties served (San Francisco, San Mateo, and Santa Clara) asking them to purchase a total of US$900,000 (equivalent to $32,250,000 in 2025) in stock of the new company. This was portrayed in the news as "an attempted fraud upon the tax-payers of the counties" and the company dissolved in June 1860. A new SF&SJ incorporated on August 18, 1860 with San Francisco industrialist Peter Donahue stepping in as treasurer, choosing his friends Judge Timothy Dame as president and Henry Newhall, a successful San Francisco auctioneer, as vice-president, and placing the company headquarters in San Francisco. Donahue, Dame and Newhall are thus credited as the three co-founders of the line.

=== Funding and construction ===
The construction contractors (Houston & McLaughlin) agreed to be paid $2 million consisting of $500,000 in cash, $500,000 in county-issued bonds, $500,000 in mortgage bonds, and $500,000 in company stock in exchange for completing the line between San Francisco and San Jose by October 1, 1863. The SF&SJ issued US$2,000,000 (equivalent to $71,670,000 in 2025) of stock in 1861 to fund construction, owned by the following major shareholders:

- US$300,000 (equivalent to $10,750,000 in 2025), City of San Francisco
- US$100,000 (equivalent to $3,580,000 in 2025), County of San Mateo
- US$200,000 (equivalent to $7,170,000 in 2025), County of Santa Clara
- US$500,000 (equivalent to $17,920,000 in 2025), construction contractors (A.H. Houston and C. McLaughlin)
- US$285,300 (equivalent to $10,220,000 in 2025), other individual shareholders
- US$500,000 (equivalent to $17,920,000 in 2025) (approximately), retained by SF&SJ

Voters in the counties of San Francisco, San Mateo, and Santa Clara passed the propositions to purchase the stock in May 1861. The cost per mile was approximately US$40,000 (equivalent to $1,430,000 in 2025), based on a total cost of $2 million for 49.3 miles (79.3 km) of rail, comparable to the average cost per rail mile based on railroads built nationwide through 1861. However, the actual cash on hand was limited to the amount contributed by the three counties and approximately $100,000 from individual subscribers. With the Civil War consuming men and material, iron suppliers were only willing to deal with cash, not credit, and several members of the SF&SJ board of directors, including Peter Donahue, Henry Newhall, and Charles B. Polhemus used their personal influence and effort to secure material for the railroad.

Construction wage scale on railroads, at $27 per month with board, was substantially lower than that of common laborers in the mines or in the cities at the time. Partly because of the low wage scale, the SF&SJ Railroad was one of the first railroad to experiment with hiring Chinese railroad workers to keep cost down. Hiring Chinese in the early and mid 1860s was not as controversial as expected and garnered few notices, as it was a short period of time of less hostile anti-Chinese sentiments.

Grading and construction of the line began in Santa Clara county on July 15, 1861. The hardest part of construction was the cut at Bernal Hill in San Francisco, which was being cut through at both ends in Spring 1862 in earnest with "heavy and continuous assaults of powder". After ten months of labor, the Bernal Cut, about 2,700 feet (820 m) in length and 43 feet (13 m) in depth in the deepest part, was completed in March 1863. Three months later, track laying began at Seventeen Mile House in June 1863.

Four months later, the railroad was opened for excursion service between San Francisco and Menlo Park on October 17, 1863. The first train left Mission Station at approximately 10:30 AM; it consisted of six passenger cars, two baggage cars, and one freight car pulled by two locomotives and carried approximately 400 passengers. The train ran to the end of the line in Mayfield (in Santa Clara county, modern-day Palo Alto, two miles south of Menlo Park) before turning around and returning to Menlo Park where the passengers disembarked for a SF&SJ-sponsored picnic. Among the passengers enjoying that day's excursion were two Governors: Leland Stanford of California and A. C. Gibbs of Oregon. This occurred nine days before the first rail of the great Pacific Railroad was even laid in Sacramento.

The shrill whistle of the engine, and the rattling of the cars so lately heard in your beautiful valley for the first time, will be sounds familiar to your children and children's children, until the angel, with one foot upon the sea and the other upon the dry land, shall declare that time shall be no more. Hereafter the citizens of San José and those of San Francisco will be neighbors, while the little county of San Mateo extends one hand over the iron track to her proud city sister of San Francisco, and the other to her charming rural sister of Santa Clara, and enfolds them in an embrace that can never be broken.

— Timothy Guy Phelps, Speech at the inauguration of service, January 16, 1864

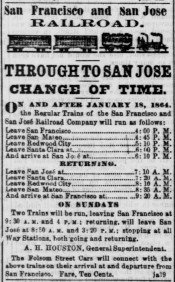
SF&SJ RR schedule and fare, January 1864

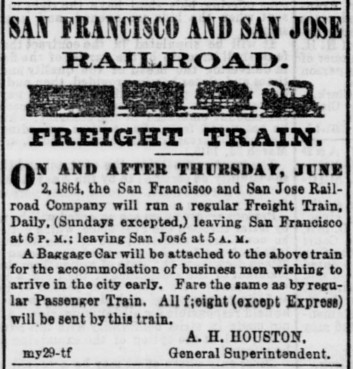
Ad for regular freight train on SF&SJ RR, effective 2 June 1864

A few months later, the line to San Jose was completed on January 16, 1864. The first train to San Jose departed at 9:55 AM and arrived in Santa Clara nearly three hours later after "liberal stopping periods" in San Mateo and Redwood City. The second train departed at 11:15 AM after adding several cattle cars to accommodate the estimated 700–800 passengers; that second train stopped briefly in San Mateo to take on fuel and water, and proceeded past waiting passengers at Redwood City and Mountain View, arriving in Santa Clara by 12:45 PM. The two trains proceeded together to San Jose just after 1:00 PM, and were greeted by a thirteen-gun salute upon arrival. After several speeches by SF&SJ leaders and local dignitaries, a large barbecue was held, with the first return train departing around 4:00 PM, pulled by three locomotives, and the second return train departing around 9:00 PM.

The railroad cut what had previously been an eight-hour trip by "steamboat and stagecoach" to three-and-a-half hours. In February 1864, the SF&SJ advertised regular passenger service on four trains per day, with the trip scheduled to take two hours, twenty minutes each way.

More importantly, the railroad opened a new economical means to transport goods to market. By June 1864 a regular freight train was added. In October 1864 the freight train (with passenger car attached) was leaving San Jose at 5am and arriving San Francisco at 8:50am; the return train leaving San Francisco 4:15pm and arriving San Jose 8:15pm. With the decline of placer mining, the completion of the railroad enabled the ascendancy of agriculture as a major new industry in California.

=== Southern Pacific and later years ===
The Southern Pacific Railroad (SP) acquired the company in March 1868, and the Southern Pacific and Central Pacific were consolidated as the Southern Pacific on October 12, 1870, nearly seven years to the day after the first trains ran between San Francisco and Menlo Park. SP upgraded the line in the early 20th century by laying down a second track and building several alternative routes and shortcuts, including the Dumbarton Cutoff, which created the first bridge across San Francisco Bay; and the Bayshore Cutoff, which rerouted the line between San Francisco and San Bruno to the east of San Bruno Mountain, along the San Francisco Bay shoreline. The original route between San Francisco and San Bruno became the Ocean View Branch, which was abandoned in stages beginning in 1942. Portions of Interstate 280 and Bay Area Rapid Transit later reused that alignment.

In 1977 SP petitioned the California Public Utilities Commission to discontinue the Peninsula Commute service, and the State of California took over financial responsibility in July 1980. SP eventually sold the entire Peninsula Commute right-of-way to the Peninsula Corridor Joint Powers Board in 1991, which currently operates the commuter rail service known as Caltrain over the route. The Union Pacific Railroad maintains trackage rights over the line for freight traffic.

== Route ==
San Francisco & San Jose Railroad Stations
Distance (Note: Distance along line from San Francisco station at Brannan between Third and Fourth)	Station	Elevation (Note: Height above sea level)
—	San Francisco (Note: Located at the corner of 4th and Brannan)	n/a
2 1/4 mi 3.6 km	Mission	n/a
4 mi 6.4 km	Brannan's	n/a
4 1/4 mi 6.8 km	Bernal	n/a
6 1/4 mi 10.1 km	San Miguel	n/a (Note: Track elevation reaches a peak of 295 ft (90 m) at Abbey Summit as the line traverses San Bruno Mountain.)
9 mi 14 km	School House	n/a
11 1/2 mi 18.5 km	Twelve-Mile Farm	12 ft 3.7 m
14 1/4 mi 22.9 km	San Bruno	n/a
16 3/4 mi 27.0 km	Seventeen Mile House	6 ft 1.8 m
20 3/4 mi 33.4 km	San Mateo	22 ft 6.7 m
25 mi 40 km	Belmont	32 ft 9.8 m
28 1/4 mi 45.5 km	Redwood City	17 ft 5.2 m
28 3/4 mi 46.3 km	East Redwood City	n/a
32 1/2 mi 52.3 km	Menlo Park	n/a
34 1/2 mi 55.5 km	Mayfield	27 ft 8.2 m
37 3/4 mi 60.8 km	Castro's (Note: Although listed as a station, service did not extend south past Mayfield until January 1864.)	n/a
40 mi 64 km	Mountain View	96 ft 29 m
43 3/4 mi 70.4 km	Laurence's	n/a
46 1/2 mi 74.8 km	Santa Clara	73 ft 22 m
49 3/4 mi 80.1 km	San José	87 ft 27 m

== Design ==
The Daily Alta California (October 1863) called this SF&SJ segment the westernmost portion of the transcontinental Pacific Railroad, with another section planned by the Western Pacific Railroad Company to connect San Jose with Sacramento, where it would join with the Central Pacific's rail line being built then east to Truckee. In order to preserve planned compatibility with transcontinental rail traffic, the line was laid at what is now standard gauge width using redwood ties and 50-pound-per-yard (25 kg/m) rail.

The line was completed as a single track with no tunnels and only a few bridges, the longest of which was a 240-foot (73 m) trestle over Islais Creek. The most extensive cut required was the big cut at Bernal Hill, more than 1/2 mile (0.80 km) long and 43 feet (13 m) deep at its deepest. In October 1863, the line had only been partially completed between the Mission and Mayfield stations; the Daily Alta noted the SF&SJ had been negotiating with the Market Street Railway and speculated the SF&SJ might use the Market Street Railway approach to Fourth Street in San Francisco.

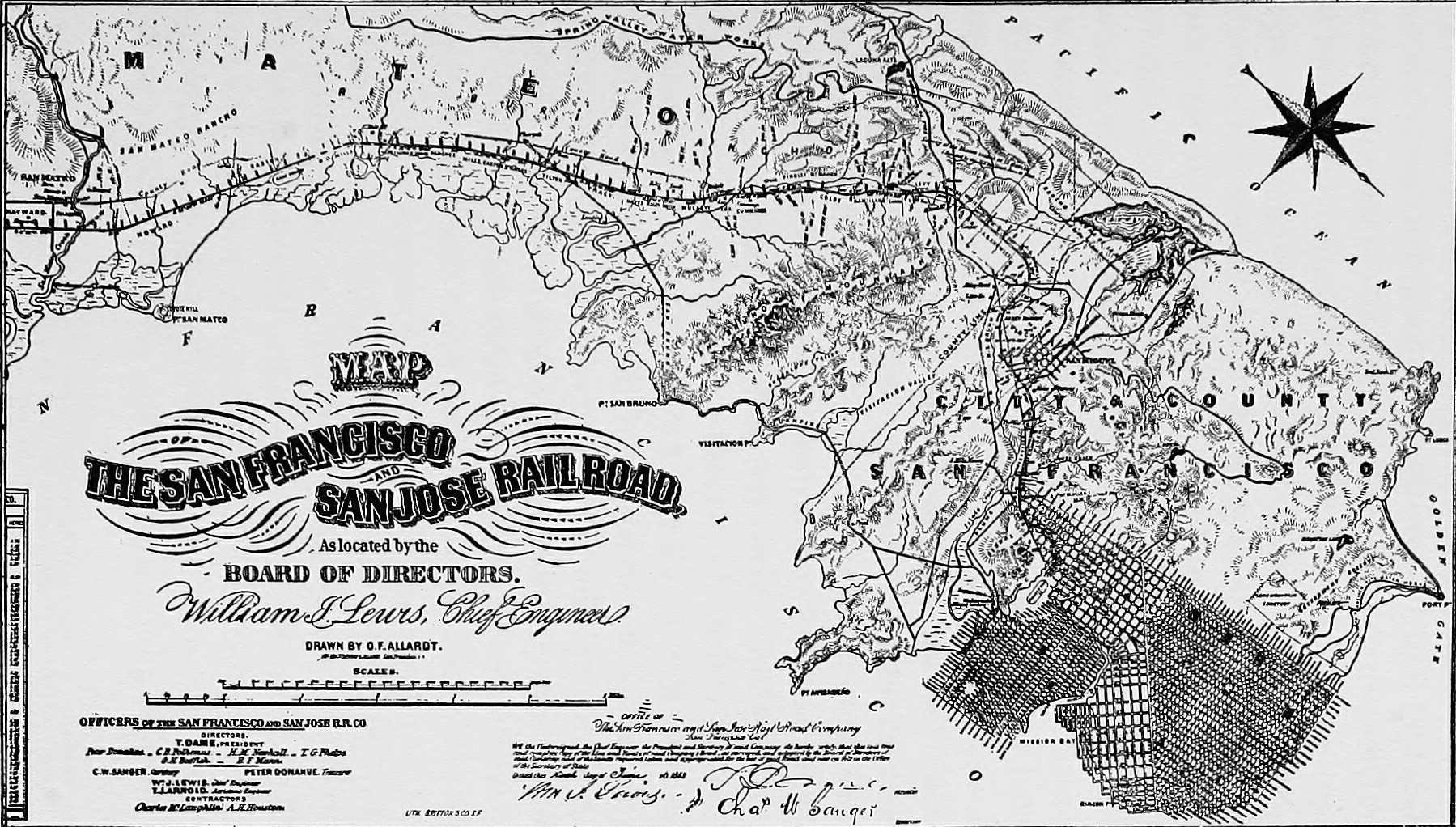
Map of the northern end of the SF&SJ Railroad (1862)

=== Rolling stock ===
The SF&SJ started excursion service in October 1863 with three locomotives, six passenger cars, and approximately twenty freight cars. Each engine cost US$15,000 (equivalent to $390,000 in 2025) and could haul six passenger cars; the passenger cars cost US$3,500 (equivalent to $90,000 in 2025) each and had a seated capacity of sixty passengers; the freight cars each cost approximately US$1,200 (equivalent to $30,000 in 2025). The locomotives were named the San Francisco, San José, and T. Dame (after the president of the SF&SJ).

With the exception of the single 0-4-0 switcher, number 8, all SF&SJ locomotives were the American 4-4-0 type typical of that era. The 17-ton San Francisco and San José were built in 1862 by Norris Locomotive Works of Philadelphia, Pennsylvania. The third locomotive was built in Massachusetts by Mason Machine Works, and weighed 30 tons. Locomotives numbered 4 and 5 weighing 23 tons each were built by Cooke Locomotive and Machine Works of New Jersey in 1863.

The first full-sized steam locomotive produced in the state of California was built for the SF&SJ by the Union Iron Works in San Francisco. It was appropriately named the California. Its inaugural run was August 30, 1865, during which it set a speed record of 67 miles per hour (108 km/h). Union Iron works also built a similar 28-ton locomotive number 7 and the 18-ton switcher number 8 in 1865. Norris built two more SF&SJ locomotives weighing 26 tons and 28 tons in 1867, while McKay and Aldus of Boston built two 30-ton locomotives. Rhode Island Locomotive Works built a 30-ton locomotive for SF&SJ in 1868, as did Cooke; and Schenectady Locomotive Works built two more. 1870 brought another 30-ton locomotive from Mason and two 33-ton locomotives from Cooke.

== See also ==
- List of defunct California railroads
- San Francisco and Alameda Railroad
- San Francisco and Oakland Railroad

== California Digital Newspaper Collection ==
- "San Jose and San Francisco Railroad". Daily Alta California. Vol. 2, no. 270. September 8, 1851.
- "San Jose and San Francisco Railroad". Daily Alta California. Vol. 2, no. 282. September 20, 1851.
- "San Jose Railroad". Daily Alta California. Vol. 5, no. 326. November 25, 1854.
- "San Francisco and Railroads". Sacramento Daily Union. Vol. 17, no. 2539. May 17, 1859.
- "The San Jose Railroad". Daily Alta California. Vol. 15, no. 4981. October 18, 1863.
- "San Jose Railroad Completed". Sacramento Daily Union. Vol. 26, no. 4003. January 20, 1864.
