= Factrix =

American band

- Origin: San Francisco, California, United States
- Genres: Industrial music experimental, gothic rock
- Years active: 1978–1982
- Labels: Subterranean Records, Adolescent Records, Storm Records
- Website: Myspace fan page

Factrix was an American pioneering industrial group from San Francisco, formed in 1978 by Bond Bergland, Cole Palme, and Joseph T. Jacobs, and was praised by Carlo McCormick as "one of the great bands of their era, prescient and influential."

Factrix the group released a number of experimental industrial and gothic rock recordings in the early 1980s. Their first 7" single, "Empire Of Passion/Splice Of Life" balanced sound-poetry with minimalist rock, using tape permutations and found percussion to evoke bleak and droning walls of sound. The first full-length LP, "Scheintot", expanded on the directions taken with their first single, creating a morbid, moody, and subtle experimental rock album that was highly innovative for its time. Reminiscent at times of bands like Throbbing Gristle or early Cabaret Voltaire ("Anemone Housing" or "Over My Shoulder - And Out of My Life"), the album also managed to demonstrate a strong rock sensibility, betraying influences of bands like The Velvet Underground ("Ballad of the Grim Rider") or even avant rock contemporaries like Art Bears or '70s era King Crimson (the opening track, "Eerie Lights" or "The Center of the Doll"). The live LP California Babylon (1982) (a collaboration with Monte Cazazza - the record is credited to "Factrix-Cazazza" on the cover) by contrast was a far more stark and abrasive release, in both minimalist sound and morbid lyrical content. The record also featured a musical treatment of the Brion Gysin cut up "poem" "Kick that Habit Man" with avant garde percussionist Z'EV backing the band.

In 2003, German based Storm Records re-released both the single and album recorded by the band as well as selections from the California Babylon LP and previously unreleased live material on a double CD titled Artifact. The release was well received and has since gone out of print.

== Discography ==
- Empire of Passion / Splice of Life 7" single (1980, Subterranean Records)
- Scheintot (1981, Adolescent Records)
- California Babylon (with Monte Cazazza) (1982, Subterranean Records)
- Artifact (2003, Storm Records)
