= Mabuhay Gardens =

Nightclub in San Francisco, California, U.S.

Coordinates: 37°47′52.4″N 122°24′16.3″W

- The Fab Mab, The Mab
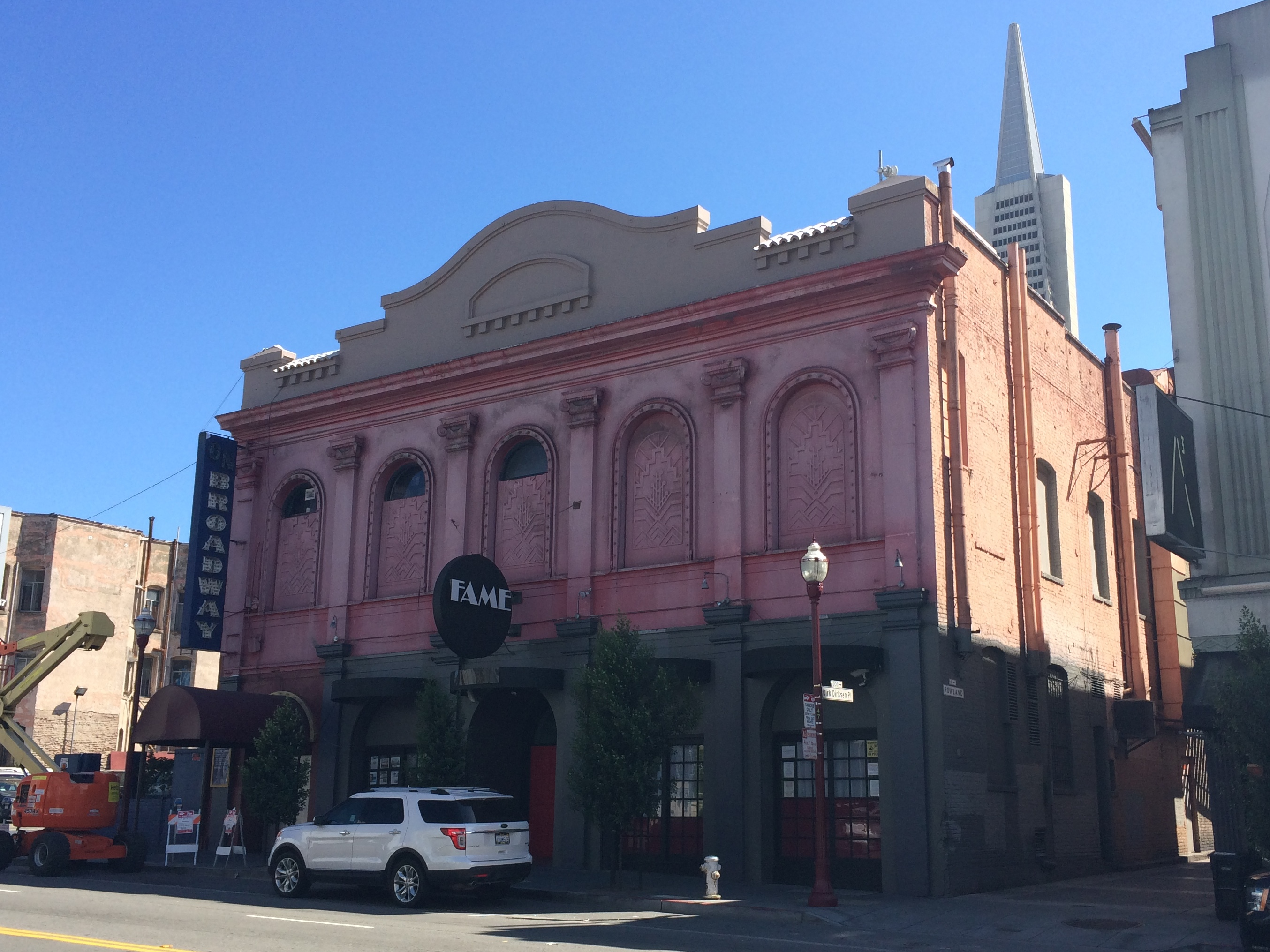
- 443 and 435 Broadway in 2015, former location of Mabuhay Gardens
- Interactive map of Mabuhay Gardens
- Former names: Mabuhay Restaurant
- Address: 443 Broadway Street
- Location: North Beach, San Francisco, California
- Owner: Ness Aquino
- Type: Nightclub
- Events: Punk rock, New Wave, comedy
- Current use: Event venue (Fame Venue)

Construction
- Opened: 1976
- Closed: 1987

The Mabuhay Gardens, also known as The Fab Mab or The Mab, was a former San Francisco nightclub, located at 443 Broadway, in the Broadway strip club area of North Beach. It closed in 1987. The building housed other nightclub and event venues in subsequent years. In 2025, a new operator reopened the venue under the name Mabuhay Gardens.

== History ==
The Mabuhay Gardens was located in the lower level of the 435 Broadway building, which also housed the On Broadway Theater, known in 1984–1985 as "Rock on Broadway."

Originally a Filipino restaurant and music club owned by Ness Aquino, it featured many Filipino celebrities, including Eddie Mesa, the "Elvis Presley of the Philippines". Aquino and Amapola also co-hosted a weekly television program, The Amapola Presents Show on KEMO TV Channel 20.

During the late 1970s, Jerry Paulsen was the first promoter of bands to appear at Mabuhay Gardens on a regular basis. He booked them on Mondays and Tuesdays to begin with so he could showcase the bands that he featured in Psyclone magazine to existing record executives. The scene became so popular that he was soon booking two bands a night seven days a week.

Bay Area punk and New Wave bands performed there, and it was an important touring stop for bands from beyond the San Francisco Bay Area. Among the local bands that performed regularly at the Mabuhay Gardens were Avengers, Dead Kennedys, The Contractions, The Nuns, Crime, Dils, Fear, Pearl Harbor and the Explosions, the Tubes and Wall of Voodoo, to name a few. After Paulsen left, Dirk Dirksen (the "pope of punk") booked The Dead Boys, Swans (band), Nico, The Runaways, Devo, X, The Police, SVT, The Go-Go's, Motörhead, Sun Ra and his Arkestra, Patti Smith, Primus, The Jim Carroll Band, REM, Metallica (in 1982), Diet Tribe, and others. Blondie appeared twice on their first West coast tour, in March 1977. Comedians such as Whoopi Goldberg and Robin Williams also made early appearances at the venue, with Williams once describing hell as "opening for the Ramones at the Mabuhay Gardens."

Dirk Dirksen, nephew of Illinois Senator Everett Dirksen, had a unique style as emcee, deliberately baiting and trading insults with audience and band members, which had the effect of raising the energy of audience and performers alike. In order to maintain the show's fast pace, he would move past an encore to get to the next band and tell the audience, "Eat it." Dirksen's abrasive persona (which was largely a performance) was a central part of the atmosphere of Mabuhay Gardens. He was sometimes referred to as the "poor man's Bill Graham." Dirksen was the sole person responsible for connecting the English punk rockers with those in the United States. By creating an exchange program, punk bands from England and New York City came to the Mabuhay Gardens and vice versa, staying in each city performing a few nights at a time. This spread the "punk" scene globally making it a household word, thanks to Dirksen and Aquino. The alley located next to the Mabuhay Gardens is now named for Dirksen.

The Mabuhay Gardens closed in 1987. The building subsequently housed a nightclub called the Velvet Lounge. The venue was again opened in September 2007 under the name Club 443. Fame Venue operated at 443 Broadway, which is used for conferences, concerts, catering and other events.

== In popular culture ==
American visual artist Bruce Conner documented the punk scene at Mabuhay Gardens through a series of concert photographs that featured action shots of Negative Trend, Crime, Avengers, and other notable Mabuhay Gardens mainstays. In a 2014 essay, artist Emma Hart reflected on the legacy of Conner's Mabuhay Gardens photographs writing, "Never holding back while photographing punk rock shows at the Mabuhay Gardens, Conner documents his immersion in the scene, breaking the boundary between spectator and performer and providing a lens into the punk world of late 1970s when Mabuhay Gardens, or Fab Mab, emerged as the center of the San Francisco punk club milieu."

The Mabuhay Gardens was featured in a chapter from Jennifer Egan's A Visit from the Goon Squad (Pulitzer 2011). This chapter, "Ask Me if I Care," was also published in the March 8, 2010, issue of the New Yorker. The Mabuhay Gardens are referenced in the song "Looking for Lewis And Clark" by the Los Angeles band The Long Ryders on their 1985 album State of the Union.

Rapper Vinnie Paz named a track Mabuhay Gardens on his As Above, So Below album.

The Mabuhay Gardens is also featured in Circus of the Sun (2019), J.Macon King's novel set in late Seventies' North Beach. Jack, the main character in the novel, is in a band that plays its first major gig at the Mabuhay, along with the Dead Kennedys and Pearl Harbor and the Explosions. Dirk Dirksen is portrayed in a real-life role as show host and MC. (J.Macon King is the founder and editor of the Mill Valley Literary Review.)

== Building history for 435 Broadway ==
The building was built in 1919 and was originally called the Garibaldi Hall, an Italian Men’s Club. During the 1940s, the building housed the Italian Supper Club.

In 1962, the On Broadway Theater opened in the upper level of the 435 Broadway building in the North Beach area of San Francisco. "Oh! Calcutta!" was presented at the On Broadway Theatre, in 1969. In 1984, the upstairs club opened as Brent Turner’s Rock On Broadway. The club was a mecca for glam, heavy metal, and Bay Area thrash metal.

The Broadway Studios opened in 1993, later named the On Broadway Dinner Theater.
