= San Bruno station (Caltrain) =

Train station in San Bruno, California, U.S.

San Bruno
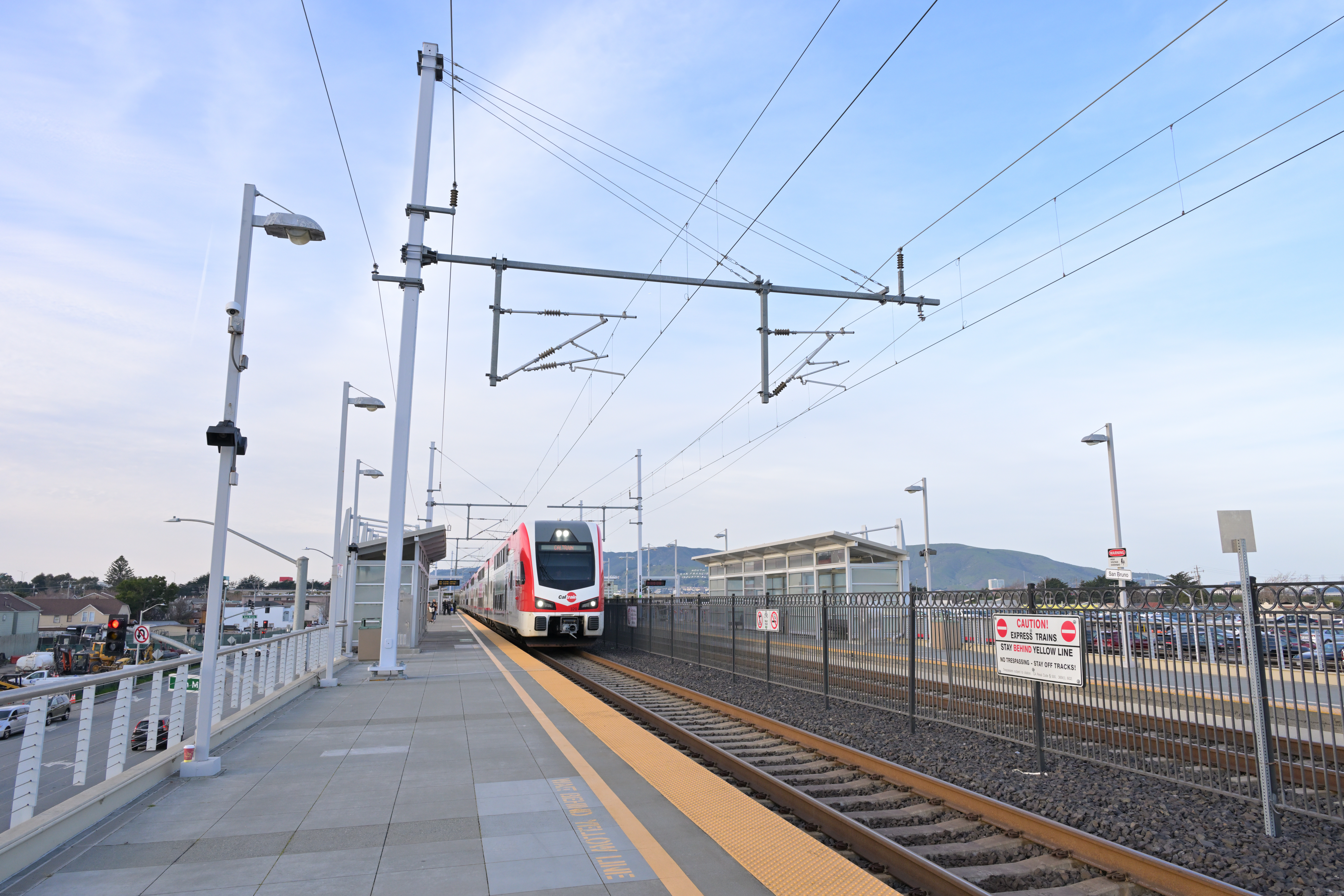
- A southbound train at San Bruno station in 2026

General information
- Location: 833 San Mateo Avenue; San Bruno, California
- Coordinates: 37°37′50″N 122°24′42″W
- Owner: Peninsula Corridor Joint Powers Board (PCJPB)
- Line: PCJPB Peninsula Subdivision
- Platforms: 2 side platforms
- Tracks: 2
- Connections: SamTrans: 140, 141, 398, ECR; Bayhill San Bruno Caltrain Shuttle

Construction
- Structure type: Elevated
- Parking: 178 spaces; paid
- Cycle facilities: 7 racks, 16 lockers
- Accessible: Yes

Other information
- Fare zone: 1

History
- Opened: October 18, 1863
- Rebuilt: 2000–2003; October 2010–April 1, 2014

Passengers
- FY 2025: 377 per weekday ▲62%

Services
Preceding station	Caltrain	Following station
South San Francisco toward San Francisco	Local	Millbrae toward San Jose Diridon or Tamien
South San Francisco toward San Francisco	Weekend Local	Millbrae toward San Jose Diridon or Tamien
Limited does not stop here
Express does not stop here
Former services
Preceding station	Caltrain	Following station
South San Francisco toward San Francisco	Local (L1)	Millbrae toward San Jose Diridon or Tamien
South San Francisco toward San Francisco	Weekend Local (L2)	Millbrae toward San Jose Diridon or Tamien
22nd Street toward San Francisco	Limited (L4)	Millbrae toward San Jose Diridon, Tamien or Gilroy
Preceding station	Southern Pacific Railroad	Following station
South San Francisco toward San Francisco	Coast Line	Millbrae toward Los Angeles
Tanforan toward San Francisco	Ocean View Branch	Terminus
Tanforan (pre 1907) toward San Francisco	Peninsula Commute	Lomita Park (closed 1963) toward San Jose
South San Francisco toward San Francisco	Peninsula Commute	Millbrae toward San Jose
Paul Avenue toward San Francisco	Del Monte Until 1971	Burlingame toward Monterey
Location

San Bruno station is a Caltrain station located in San Bruno, California. The station is located just northeast of downtown San Bruno, above the intersection of San Mateo and San Bruno Avenues, adjacent to Artichoke Joe's Casino. It originally opened in 1863 as part of the San Francisco and San Jose Railroad. The current elevated station opened in 2014 as part of a grade crossing elimination project.

== History ==
=== Previous stations ===
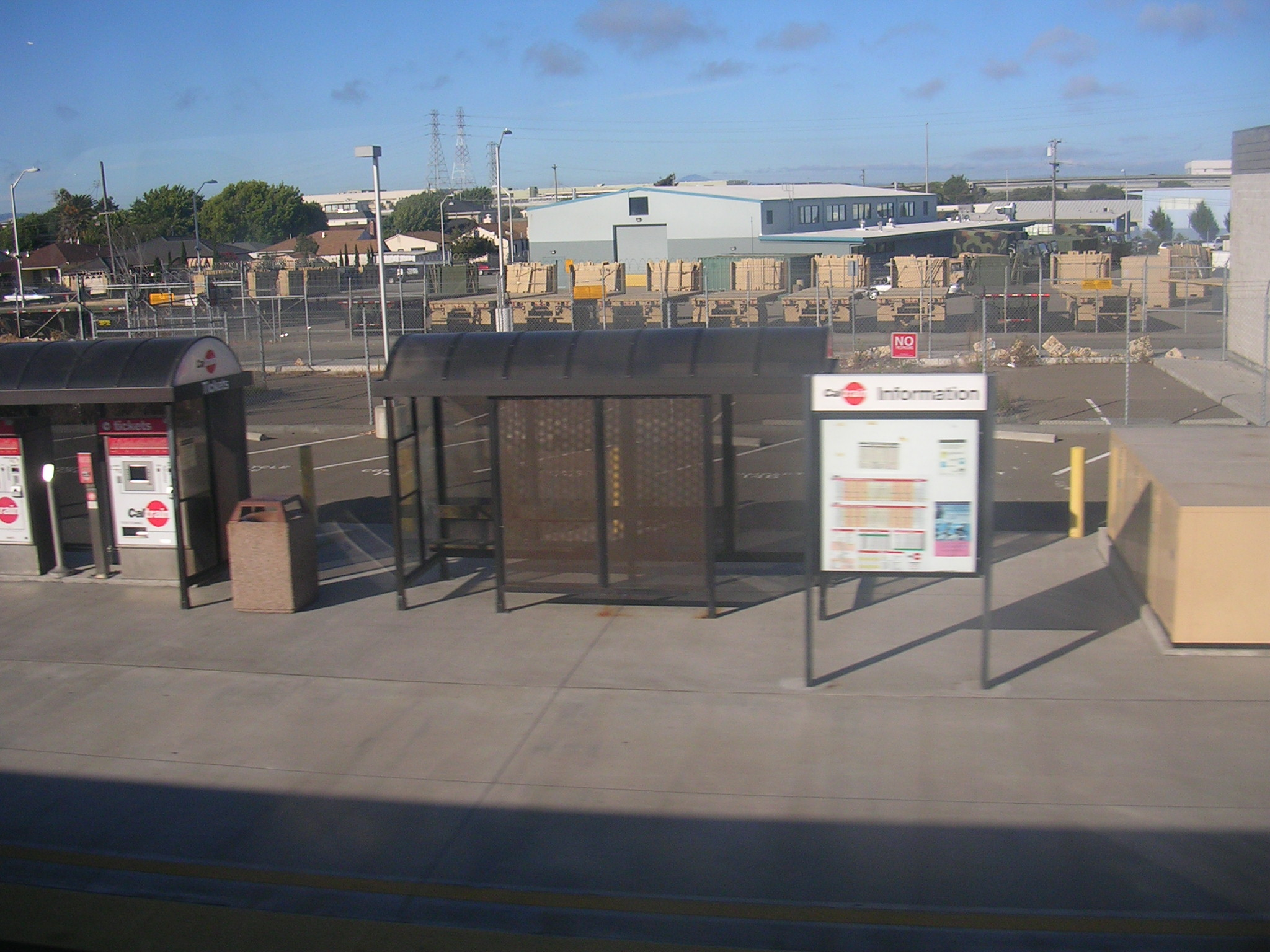
The 2003-reopened station in 2007

San Bruno was an inaugural station along the foundational San Francisco and San Jose Railroad, which began regular service on October 18, 1863. The station was located off Huntington Avenue, which runs parallel to the railroad, at Euclid Avenue. The Southern Pacific Railroad (successor to the San Francisco and San Jose) chose this as the point where the Bayshore Cutoff left the old main line. It was moved one block south, approximately 750 feet (230 m), to San Bruno Avenue and expanded in 1916. The second story was removed in 1953. A new station with small concrete and wood shelters opened approximately 3,000 feet (910 m) further south of Euclid at Sylvan Avenue in 1963, and the old 1916 depot was demolished that September.

The construction of the BART extension to San Francisco International Airport and Millbrae required the construction of a BART tunnel under downtown San Bruno. The station at Sylvan that was completed in 1963 was demolished in 1998; in April 1999, the Caltrain stop was moved to a temporary location under the I-380 overpass, approximately 3,700 feet (1,100 m) to the north near the Tanforan Shopping Center. A rebuilt station opened at the Sylvan Avenue site on March 24, 2003.

=== Grade separation ===
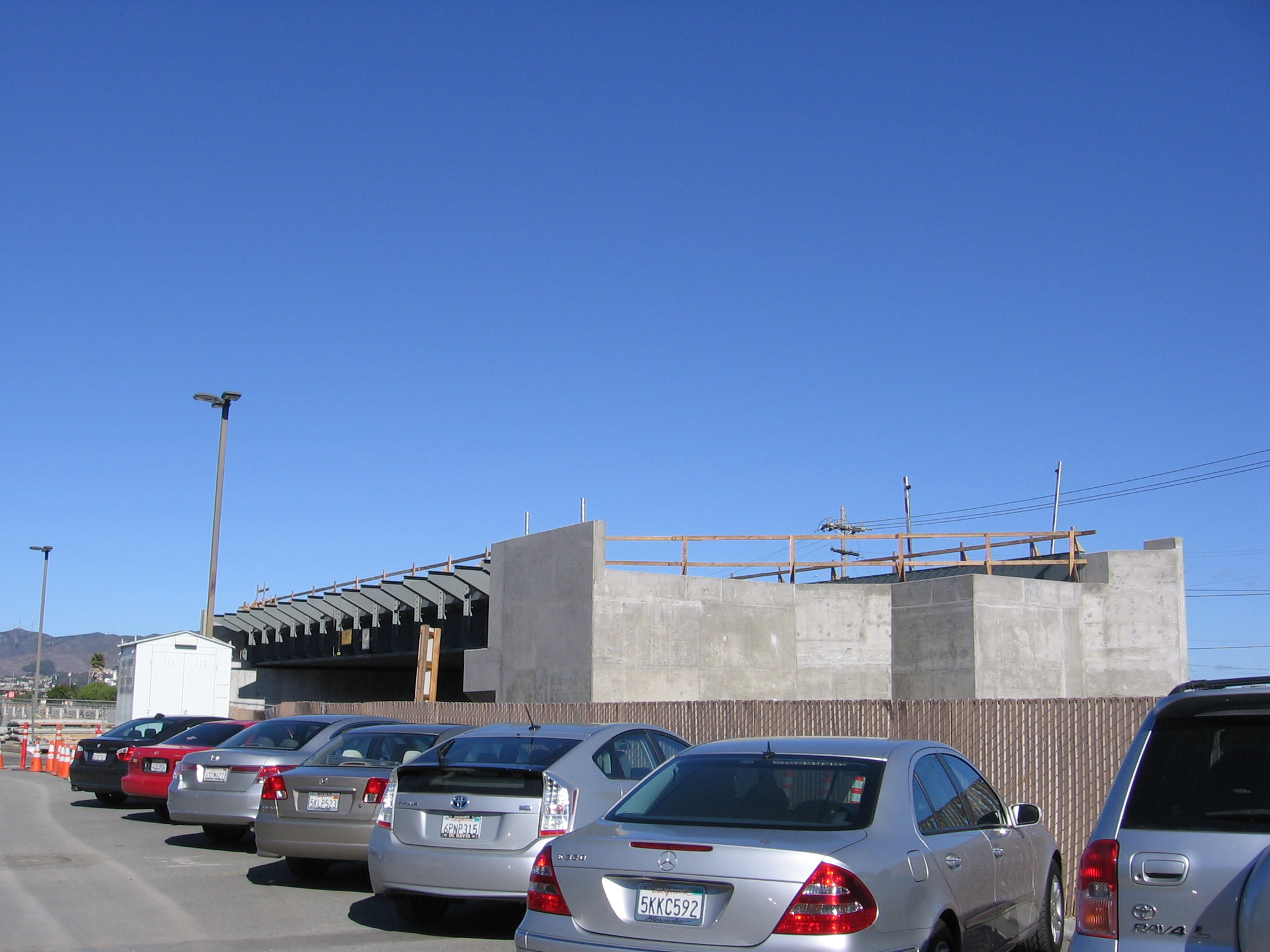
Completed Angus Ave bridge (Nov 2012)

In 2010, construction began on the San Bruno Grade Separation Project, which included new elevated tracks and a new elevated station over San Bruno Avenue, approximately 2,300 feet (700 m) north of the Sylvan Avenue station; the project included separating the existing at-grade road crossings at San Bruno, San Mateo, and Angus avenues, and would add pedestrian crossings at Sylvan, the station, and Euclid/Walnut. Tracks would be elevated by 18 feet (5.5 m) while the roads would be depressed by 4 feet (1.2 m). A monumental arch was planned over San Bruno Avenue, initially as a symbolic gateway to San Bruno on the east side of the new station, then repurposed as a tied-arch pedestrian bridge, but it has not yet been implemented. The elevated structure would be built wide enough to accommodate four tracks. Because the grade separation structures were built directly over the BART extension to the San Francisco International Airport, engineered fill was used with a density of 35 lb/ft^{2} (170 kg/m^{2}), less than 1/3 the weight of the soil being removed.

Under the original schedule, preliminary work was to begin in October or November 2010, including construction of temporary shoofly tracks and utility work, and the new structures would be built between spring 2011 and summer 2012. The budget was US$147 million, provided as a mixture of county (authorized by Measure A), state, and federal funds. In October 2010, trains began stopping at a temporary station at Georgia Avenue. Trains began using the new elevated tracks on May 26, 2013, and the new station opened on April 1, 2014.

The expanded plaza adjacent to Artichoke Joe's Casino was named Posy Park. Posy Park has a water feature consisting of a fountain with cascading terraces running down from the station to street level. However, shortly after the San Bruno Grade Separation Project was completed, inspections revealed cracks in the concrete and protective coating, causing rust to the reinforcing steel rebar, and the fountain was turned off. A request for bids to rehabilitate the fountain was posted in September 2017, but no bidders materialized, and a direct solicitation resulted in an estimate of $125,000 to recoat the concrete.

The station platforms are planned to be lengthened to accommodate through-running California High-Speed Rail service.
