= Bruce Ariss =

American artist & writer (1911–1994)

Bruce Wallace Ariss, Jr.
- Born: October 10, 1911; White Salmon, Washington, US
- Died: September 11, 1994 (aged 82); Monterey, California, US
- Occupation: painter
- Spouse: Jean McLellan Fitch

Bruce Wallace Ariss, Jr. (October 10, 1911 – September 11, 1994) was an American painter, muralist, writer, illustrator, editor as well as theater and set designer, amateur playwright and actor, and overall icon on the Monterey Peninsula, California.

== Early life ==
Ariss was born in White Salmon, Washington, the son of Bruce Wallace Ariss, a construction contractor, and Anna (née Kerwin). Ariss attended Oakland Technical High School before enrolling in the University of California, Berkeley (B.A. 1934), where he was art editor of the campus publication Occident and editor of the campus humor magazine The Pelican as well as heavyweight boxer.

At university he met Jean McLellan Fitch of Napa, California, who he described as "the prettiest girl on campus"; they married in 1934. "After graduation, Ariss operated heavy machinery for a gold mine and managed to accumulate $200 in savings". With this relatively large amount of money, Bruce, a painter, and his spouse Jean, a writer, decided to take an 18-month "honeymoon" on the Monterey Peninsula to pursue their creative efforts.

== Career ==
To augment their savings, the Arisses took over the editorship of The Monterey Beacon, an experimental local literary magazine, and published John Steinbeck’s "The Snake" in 1934. William Saroyan passed through Monterey and sold a short story for one dollar to the Arisses for publication in the Beacon. Years later Bruce Ariss created artwork and served as editor for a local magazine What’s Doing on the Monterey Peninsula.

After renting a small place in Pacific Grove, the Arisses bought several lots on Huckleberry Hill in Monterey and built a small studio-house. This evolved over the next fifty years, mostly with scrap and donated materials, into a three-story 20-plus room dwelling to meet their changing preferences and the growing needs of their five children. Ariss claimed that John Steinbeck referred to the house as a "Triumph over Architecture". It burned to the ground in 1990. "I got mad at the insurance company," he said. "I paid $80 a year for years, then they raised the rate to $800. I bought a lot of fire extinguishers and smoke alarms instead…I guess it didn’t work". At age 80, Ariss designed and rebuilt, with help from many friends, "Triumph over Architecture II," which is currently occupied by his daughter, Holly Shoats, and her spouse Al.

Ariss was a friend and contemporary of John Steinbeck, the Nobel Prize-winning author, and Ed Ricketts. Bruce and Jean Ariss accompanied Ricketts and Steinbeck on an excursion to Mexico to collect marine specimens. His account of the trip, including numerous sketches, were published in his 1988 book Inside Cannery Row: Sketches from the Steinbeck Era (Lexikos) which offers a rare insight into the obstinate but charming Steinbeck, who himself wrote of one such journey in the book The Log from the Sea of Cortez.

Bruce Ariss was a renaissance man, but primarily an artist, producing hundreds of works of art during his long career. One of his most noted works is titled Lower Alvarado Street, completed in 1936. Ariss' artwork was influenced by Diego Rivera; Ariss claimed that Rivera told him that a woodblock carving of him by Ariss was the best portrait that any artist had ever done of him. Unfortunately, many of Ariss's oil paintings and sketches were destroyed with his house in the 1990 fire.

For over six decades the Arisses were central to the Monterey Peninsula's diverse and ever-changing community of artists and writers who often passed through Ed Ricketts' lab on Cannery Row. These included John Steinbeck, Ed Ricketts, Adelle Davis, August Gay, Joseph Campbell, Robinson Jeffers, Francis Whitaker, Salvador Dalí, Jean Varda, Ellwood Graham and Barbara Graham (Judy Diem), Hank Ketcham, Henry Miller, Ward Moore and Raylyn Moore, John and Ching Smithback, Eldon Dedini, Bob Bradford, Paul McReyonlds, Arch Garner, Ephraim Doner, Eric Barker, Gus Arriola, Richard Farina, Les Gorn, and Gordon Newell.

Ariss painted a number murals, many under the Works Progress Administration (WPA), a federal program set up to create public works to relieve unemployment. Some of his murals can still be found throughout Monterey County. Working with August Gay in 1934, they created a giant WPA 150' x 10' mural for the Pacific Grove High School library depicting the Monterey coastline as it looked at the time, from the Point Pinos Lighthouse to the Old Customhouse, with Cannery Row its focal point. Unfortunately, the mural was destroyed by fire in 1946.

Ariss also painted a number of storefronts, many for the 1949 centennial, including those for Monterey Hardware, Poppy Coffee Shop and Monterey Studio on Alvadaro Street in Monterey. His mural across from Doc Ricketts' lab on Cannery Row is a current tourist attraction.

In 1989, Ariss designed a five-year mural project for a walkway in Cannery Row. He and a group of about fifty young artists painted 52 eight-foot mural sections. In 1998, the murals had faded badly and a majority of the murals were refurbished, mostly by the original artists. The walkway is now named "Bruce Ariss Way."

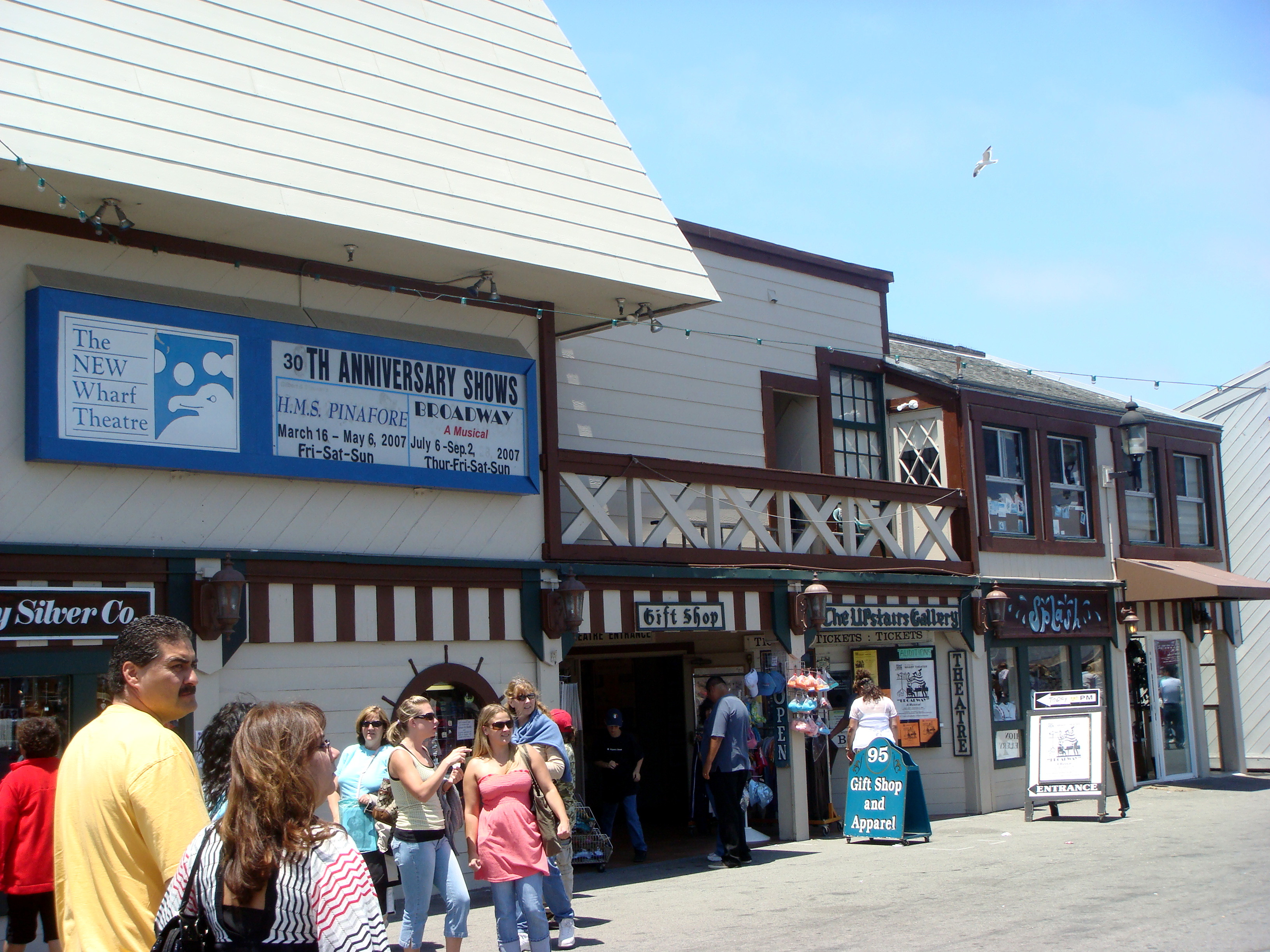
The Wharf Theater, on Monterey's Fisherman's Wharf, designed and built by Ariss

Ariss and his good friend Angelo Di Girolamo were instrumental in the founding, design and building in 1950 of the Monterey's Wharf Theater. "One of their presentations that year was Bruce Ariss' Point of Departure. The production was successful enough that MGM brought Ariss to Hollywood, where he worked for the following 5 years" building sets for The Bing Crosby Show, I Love Lucy, and other productions. Ariss also acted in the Wharf Theater; for example, he played Lennie in Steinbeck's Of Mice and Men. The theater burned down on New Year's Eve, 1959. Years later, Ariss and Di Girolamo built a new theater on the wharf, now officially named the "Bruce Ariss Wharf Theater". Ariss also did the cover and illustrations of Vincent DiGirolamo's 1990 book Whispers Under the Wharf: A Monterey Ghost Story.

Ariss was a very avid reader, mostly of science fiction. He wrote some science fiction short stories before publishing his science fiction novel, Full Circle (Avalon) in 1963. He also illustrated sci-fi works including Reginald Bretnor's Through Time and Space with Ferdinand Feghoot (1962).

One of his many interests was a concept car called the Polaris. In 1958, Ariss designed an economy sedan with innovative features such as a sliding door, front-wheel drive and modular components. Ariss worked for 12 years at the Defense Language Institute with Barney Inada in the art department. Ariss also assisted the cartoonist Hank Ketcham with Dennis the Menace.

== Death ==
Ariss died on September 11, 1994, in Monterey, California.
