= Wharf Theater =

Musical theater in Monterey, California, US

Coordinates: 36°36′18.7″N 121°53′32.48″W

Bruce Ariss Wharf Theater
- Wharf Theater
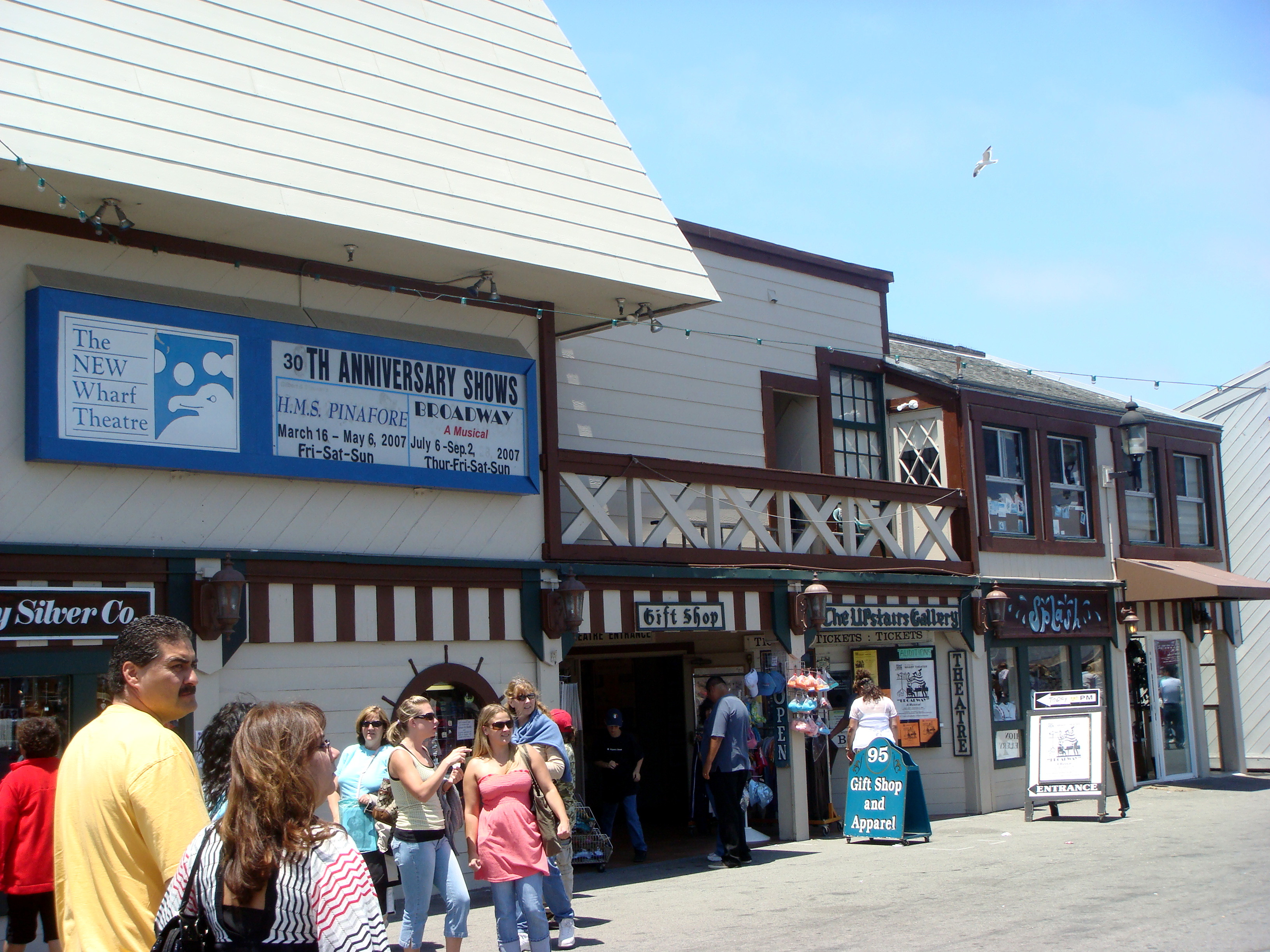
- The New Wharf Theater
- Interactive map of Bruce Ariss Wharf Theater
- Location: Monterey, California, United States
- Owner: Angelo Di Girolamo
- Capacity: 160
- Event: Musical Theatre

Construction
- Opened: Dec 3, 1976

Website
- Bruce Ariss Wharf Theater

The Bruce Ariss Wharf Theater is a musical theater located in Monterey, California. It began its history after World War II when Bruce Ariss, an artist and friend of John Steinbeck, returned to the city of Monterey after working with his father's construction company.

== History ==
Friend Yanko Varda introduced Bruce Ariss to Angelo Di Girolamo whose brother had originally proposed the idea of a theatre on Fisherman's Wharf. Along with Dan Totheroh and Kenn Smith the group located financial backing from two sisters, Virginia and Barbara Blair, who also found the location for the new theatre on the wharf.

Opening night was May 18, 1950, with a production of "Happy Birthday". Ariss designed and built the set. In 1951 Kenn Smith leased the theater to "The Wharf Players, Inc". One of their presentations that year was Bruce Ariss' "Point of Departure". The production was successful enough that MGM brought Ariss to Hollywood, where he worked for the following 5 years.

The theatre expanded and changed hands through the mid to late 1950s. Tom Brock and his partner Bob Carson produced and directed plays there until December 1959. On December 31, 1959, the Wharf Theater was destroyed by a fire, which broke out at 1:31 am.

== The Old Monterey Opera House ==
In 1960 the theater re-opened with an Equity agreement in a newly refurbished location a few blocks from the wharf. Formerly "The Monterey Theater", home of the city's legitimate theatre from 1905 to 1930 and later a movie theater, its first production was "West Side Story." Brock and Carson continued producing shows that featured local talent as well as established theatrical names such as John Kerr, Joe E. Brown, Ethel Waters, Patricia Morison, Anthony Dexter, Charles Coburn, Jack Carson, Jack Kelly, Marsha Hunt, Gypsy Rose Lee, Zasu Pitts and Dame Judith Anderson. In 1963 it was renamed "The Old Monterey Opera House", and continued until the mid-1960s when redevelopment and urban renewal leveled the location.

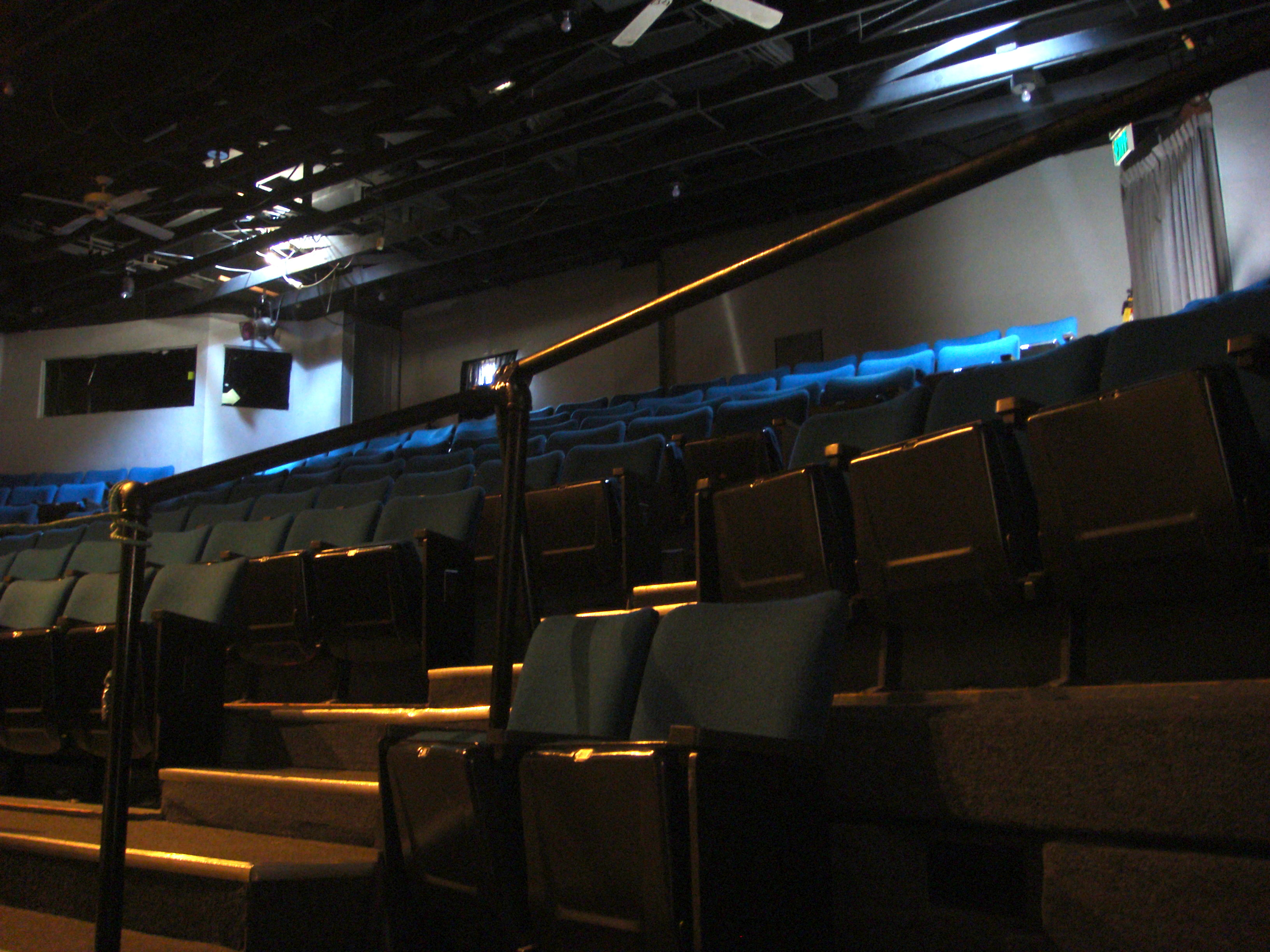
Seating for the theater

After several years the idea of a new Wharf Theater gained momentum again with both Angelo Di Girolamo and Bruce Ariss. The new theatre proposed by Di Girolamo would be on Fisherman's Wharf again, located on a site he owned across from his restaurant. Although originally too small for a theater, the location was enlarged with the purchase of three barracks buildings by Ariss and their use as building material.

The new theatre complex would have an art gallery and an office off the main lobby while on the first floor there would be room for shops. On December 3, 1976, The new Wharf Theater opened its doors with a production of Guys and Dolls.

Ariss died in September 1994 at the age of 82 and Di Girolamo died on September 21, 2014, at the age of 93. Today, the Wharf Theatre is under the management of Stacy Meheen, and continues to produce theatrical shows and serves as a venue for concerts and events. In the summer of 2018, the Wharf Theater produced a very successful production of the musical Sweeney Todd: The Demon Barber of Fleet Street.

== See also ==
- Bruce Ariss
- Fisherman's Wharf, Monterey, California
