= 22nd Street station (Caltrain) =

Train station in San Francisco, California, U.S.

22nd Street
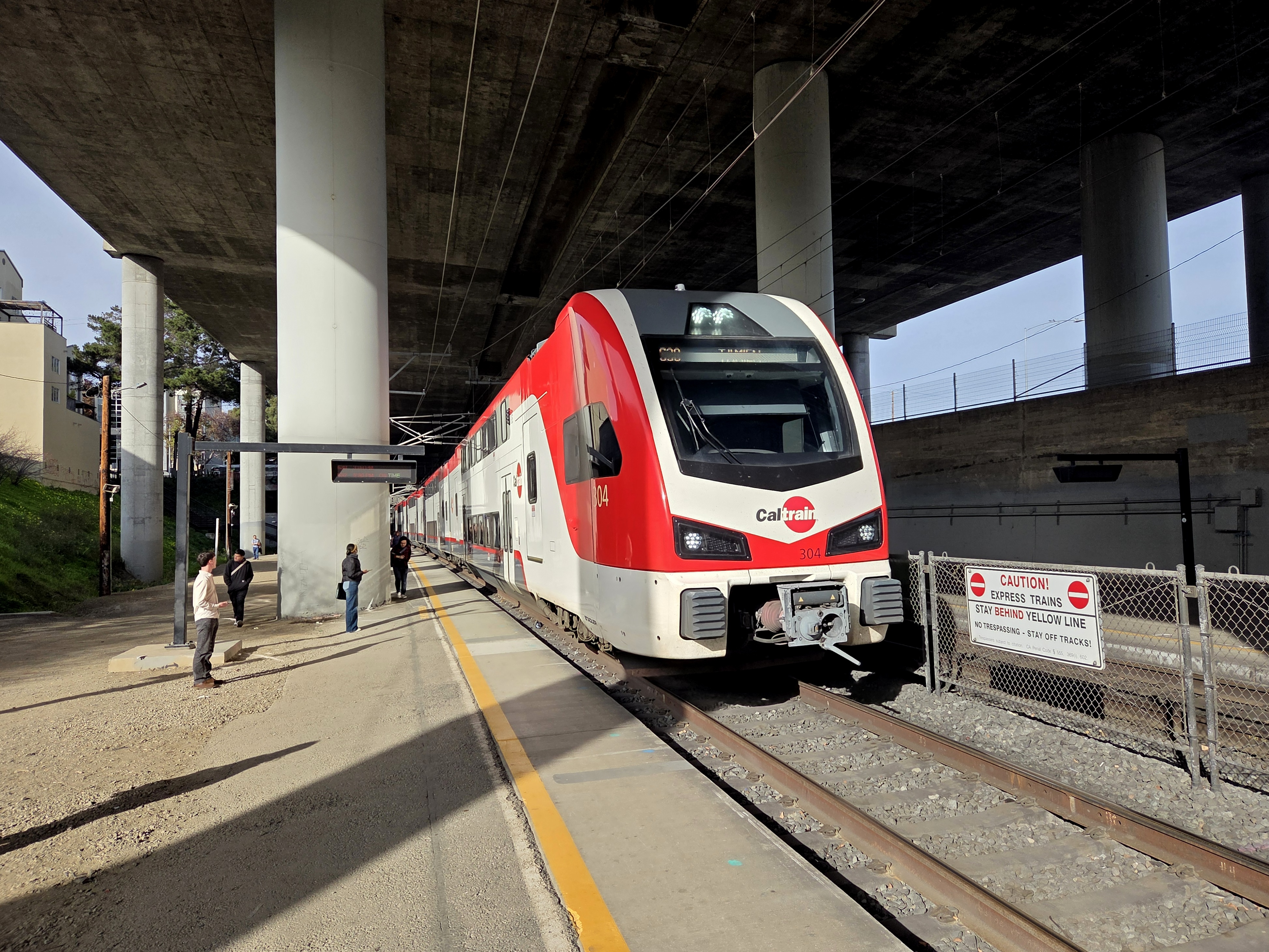
- A southbound Caltrain train at 22nd Street station in 2026

General information
- Location: 1149 22nd Street; San Francisco, California
- Coordinates: 37°45′26″N 122°23′33″W
- Owner: Peninsula Corridor Joint Powers Board (PCJPB)
- Line: PCJPB Peninsula Subdivision
- Platforms: 2 side platforms
- Tracks: 2
- Connections: Muni: 48, 55

Construction
- Structure type: Below-grade
- Parking: Street parking
- Cycle facilities: 27 racks, lockers, Bay Wheels station
- Accessible: No

Other information
- Fare zone: 1

History
- Opened: 1907
- Former names: 23rd Street
- Original company: Southern Pacific

Passengers
- FY 2025: 1,261 per weekday ▲48%

Services
Preceding station	Caltrain	Following station
San Francisco Terminus	Local	Bayshore toward San Jose Diridon or Tamien
San Francisco Terminus	Limited	South San Francisco toward San Jose Diridon
San Francisco Terminus	Express	South San Francisco toward San Jose Diridon
San Francisco Terminus	Weekend Local	Bayshore toward San Jose Diridon or Tamien
Former services
Preceding station	Caltrain	Following station
San Francisco Terminus	Local (L1)	Bayshore toward San Jose Diridon or Tamien
San Francisco Terminus	Weekend Local (L2)	Bayshore toward San Jose Diridon or Tamien
San Francisco Terminus	Limited (L3) (reverse peak)	Millbrae toward San Jose Diridon, Tamien or Gilroy
San Francisco Terminus	Limited (L4)	San Bruno toward San Jose Diridon, Tamien or Gilroy
San Francisco Terminus	Limited (L5)	Millbrae toward San Jose Diridon or Tamien
San Francisco Terminus	Baby Bullet (B7) (reverse peak)	Millbrae toward San Jose Diridon
Preceding station	Southern Pacific Railroad	Following station
San Francisco (4th and King) Terminus	Peninsula Commute Post-1975	Paul Avenue toward San Jose
San Francisco Terminus	Peninsula Commute	Paul Avenue toward San Jose
San Francisco Terminus	Coast Line	Bayshore toward Los Angeles
San Francisco Terminus	Del Monte	Paul Avenue toward Monterey
Location

22nd Street station is a Caltrain commuter rail station located south of 22nd Street between the Dogpatch and Potrero Hill neighborhoods of San Francisco, California beneath the Interstate 280 freeway viaduct. The only below-grade Caltrain station, it is bracketed on the north and south by two tunnels which take the line under the eastern slope of Potrero Hill. The station is also served by Muni routes 48 and 55.

== History ==
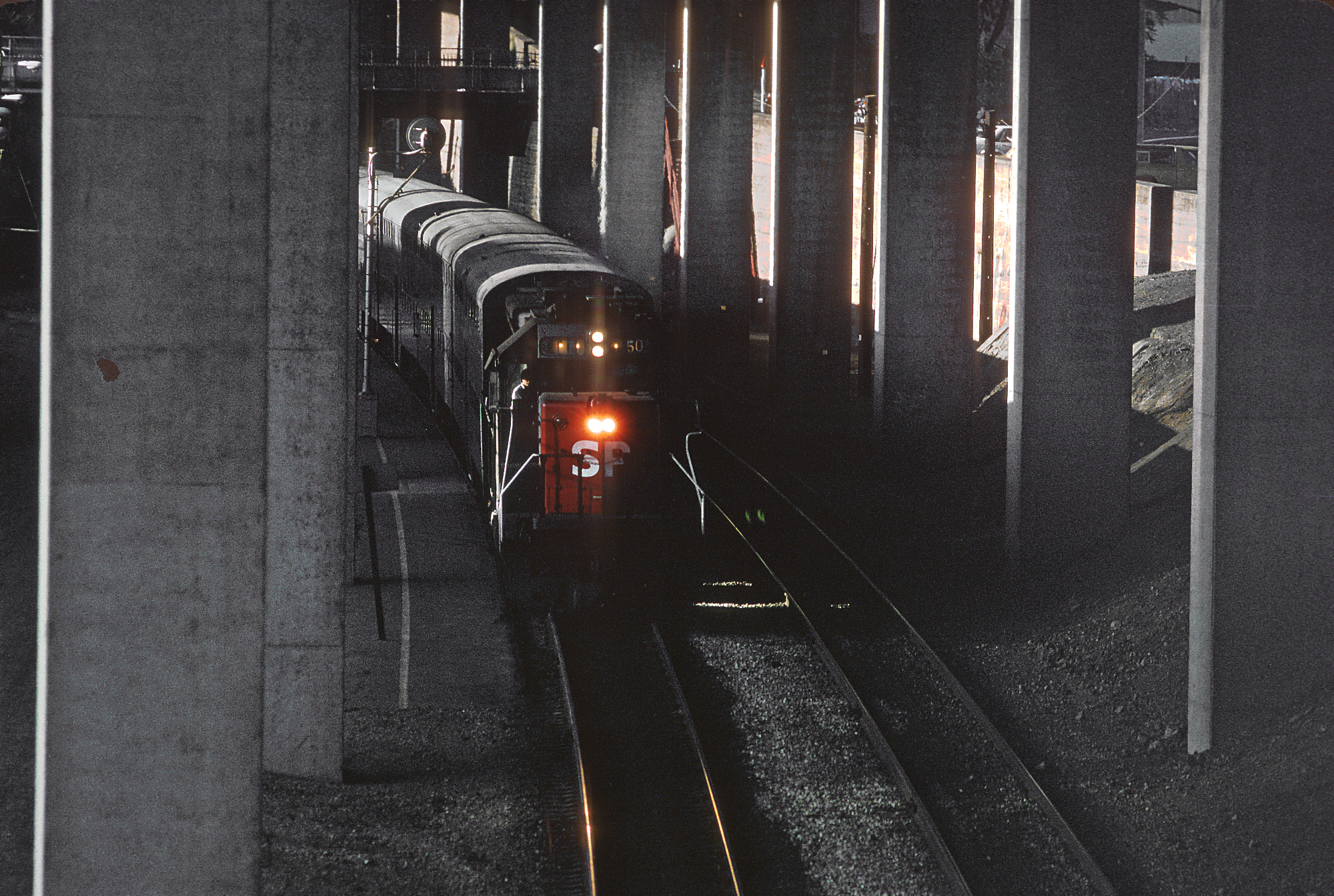
Peninsula Commute train at the station in 1985

The station opened when the Southern Pacific Railroad built the Bayshore Cutoff in 1907. The station was originally known as 23rd Street. The former wooden stairways were replaced with metal stairs in 2007.

The station is reached only by stairways from 22nd Street and Iowa Street — there are no ramps or elevators between the platforms and street level — and is thus not accessible. The narrow stairways create bottlenecks, especially when northbound trains arrive. A December 2021 study recommended the installation of ramps as an interim accessibility measure pending future reconstruction or relocation.

Under the Pennsylvania Avenue alternative of the Downtown Rail Extension (now known as The Portal) project, Caltrain tracks would be placed in a new tunnel north of 22nd Street. The existing station would be replaced by a new station, either at the existing site, or potentially north at Mariposa Street or south at Cesar Chavez Street.
