= Paul Avenue station =

Former railway station in San Francisco, California

Paul Avenue
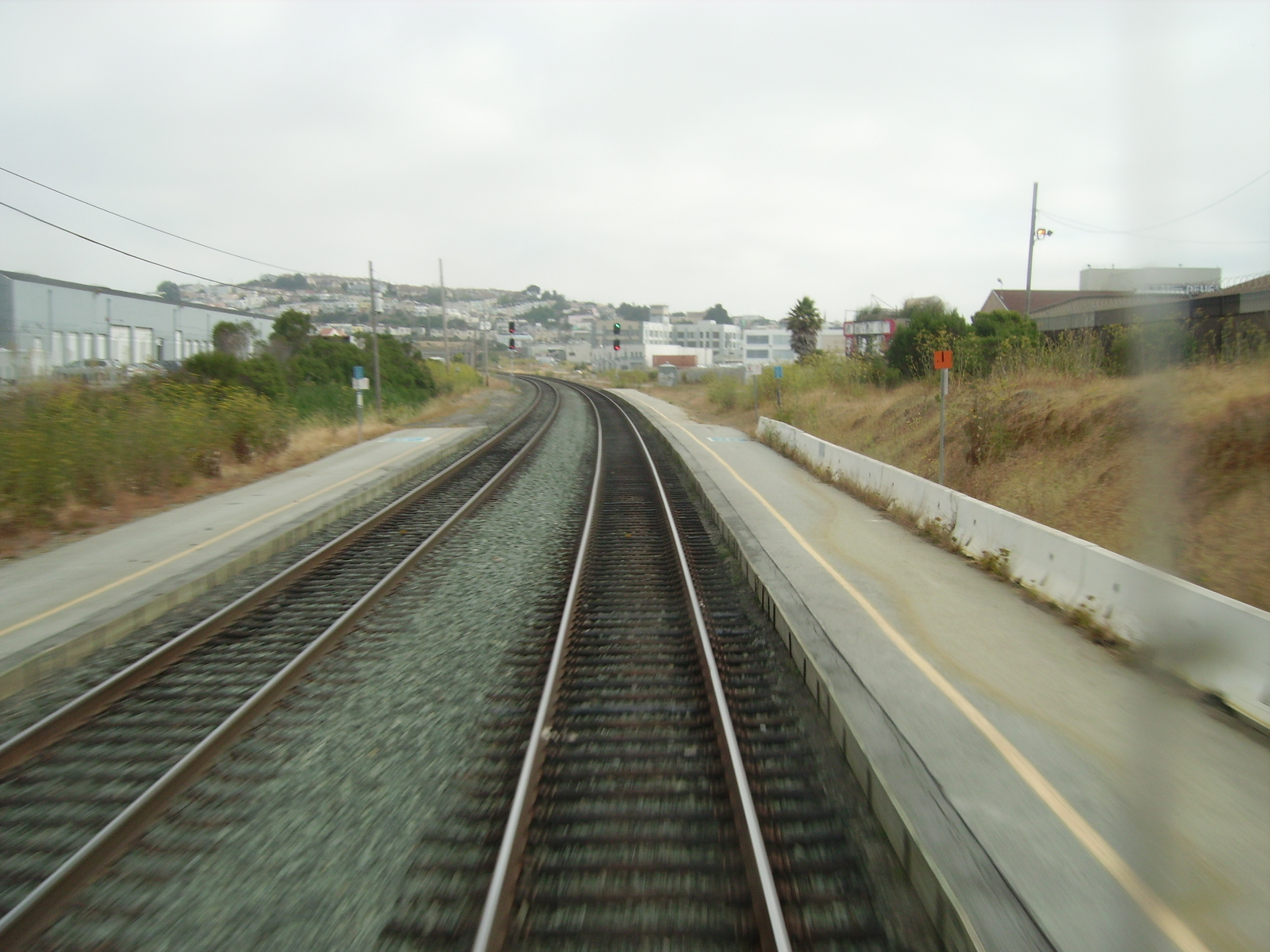
- Paul Avenue station in July 2005

General information
- Location: 1 Gould Street; San Francisco, California
- Coordinates: 37°43′24″N 122°23′49″W
- Owner: Peninsula Corridor Joint Powers Board (PCJPB)
- Line: PCJPB Peninsula Subdivision
- Platforms: 2 side platforms (now demolished)

Construction
- Accessible: No

Other information
- Fare zone: 1

History
- Closed: August 1, 2005
- Original company: Southern Pacific

Passengers
- 2005: 1 (daily average)

Former services
Preceding station	Caltrain	Following station
22nd Street toward San Francisco	Local	Bayshore toward San Jose Diridon or Tamien
Preceding station	Southern Pacific Railroad	Following station
23rd Street toward San Francisco	Peninsula Commute	Bayshore toward San Jose
23rd Street toward San Francisco	Del Monte Until 1971	San Bruno toward Monterey
Location

Paul Avenue station was a Caltrain station located in the Bayview neighborhood of San Francisco, California. The lightly used station was closed on August 1, 2005, and the platform and shelter were removed in 2009. A replacement station to the north has been proposed.

== History ==
Soon after Caltrans took over operation of the Peninsula Commute service, a study was published in 1982 recommending that Paul Avenue be closed. Service was reduced after the 1982 study. A 1987 ridership survey showed that on a typical weekday, 37 northbound passengers disembarked at Paul, 1 northbound passenger embarked, and 43 southbound passengers disembarked. In the late 1990s, Caltrain staff recommended that the station be closed due to low ridership – it was located away from residential and commercial areas, and riders found it unsafe. It was to require $3.65 million to stabilize a crumbling embankment, and modernizing the station was to have cost significantly more. However, the Caltrain board voted in February 1999 to keep the station open due to pressure from the neighborhood and from mayor Willie Brown.

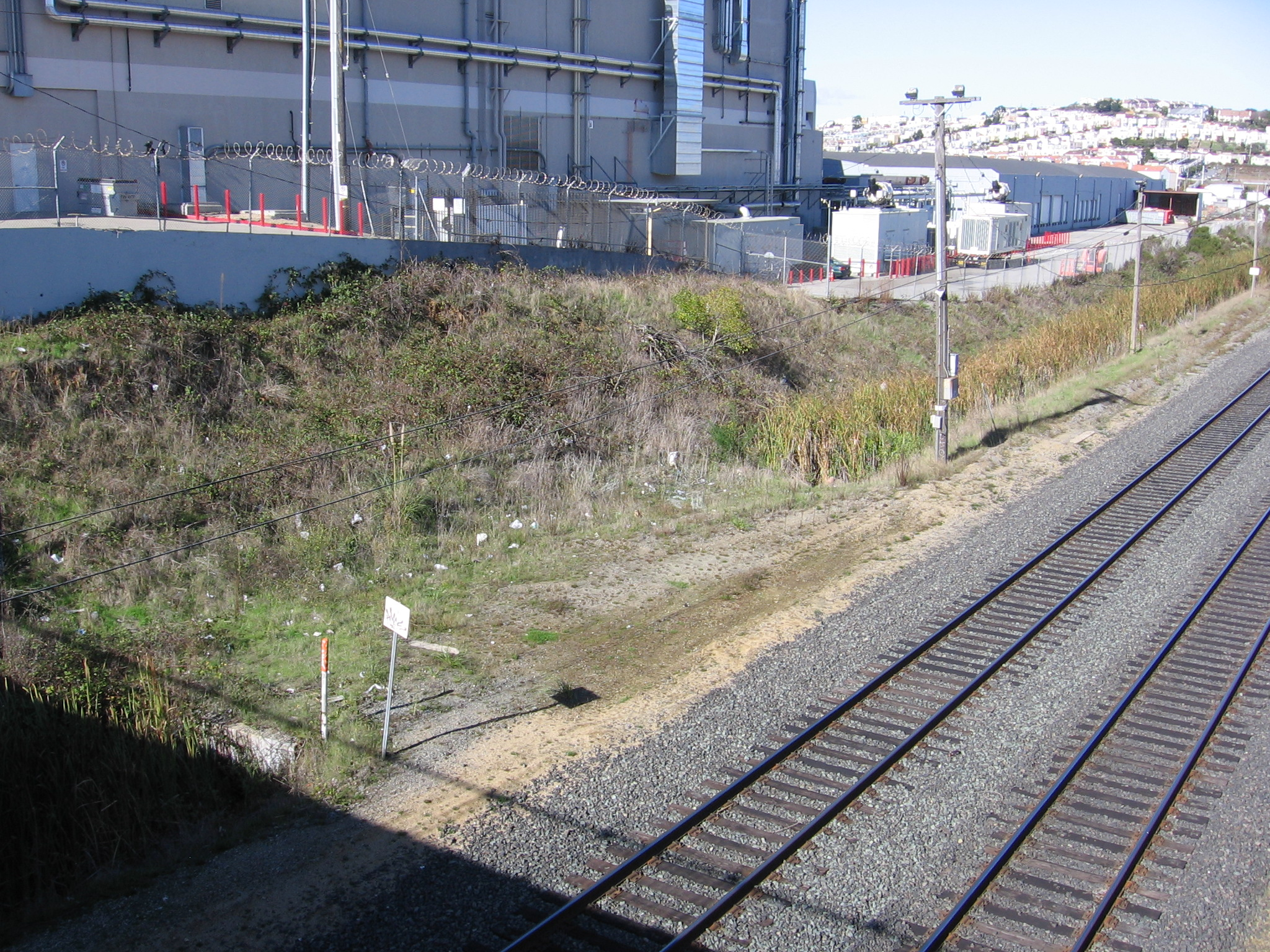
The former station site in 2012

After the Caltrain Express project was completed in 2004, only four weekday trains stopped at Paul Avenue: one northbound and one southbound local in the early morning, and one northbound and one southbound local in the evening. Before its closure in 2005, service remained at four weekday local trains, and no service on weekends.

The Peninsula Corridor Joint Powers Board, the governing body of Caltrain, voted in April 2005 to suspend service to Paul Avenue effective August 1, 2005. Weekday service was also suspended at Broadway and Atherton in order to add twelve more Baby Bullet trains to help close a funding gap, because the limited-stop express trains had typically operated at capacity and generated higher revenues than locals since their introduction in 2004.

The abandoned station was soon covered with trash and graffiti. Caltrain cleaned up the larger debris in March 2009. That July, the platforms and shelter were removed, the graffiti painted over, and a fence installed to deter access.

=== Oakdale station proposal ===
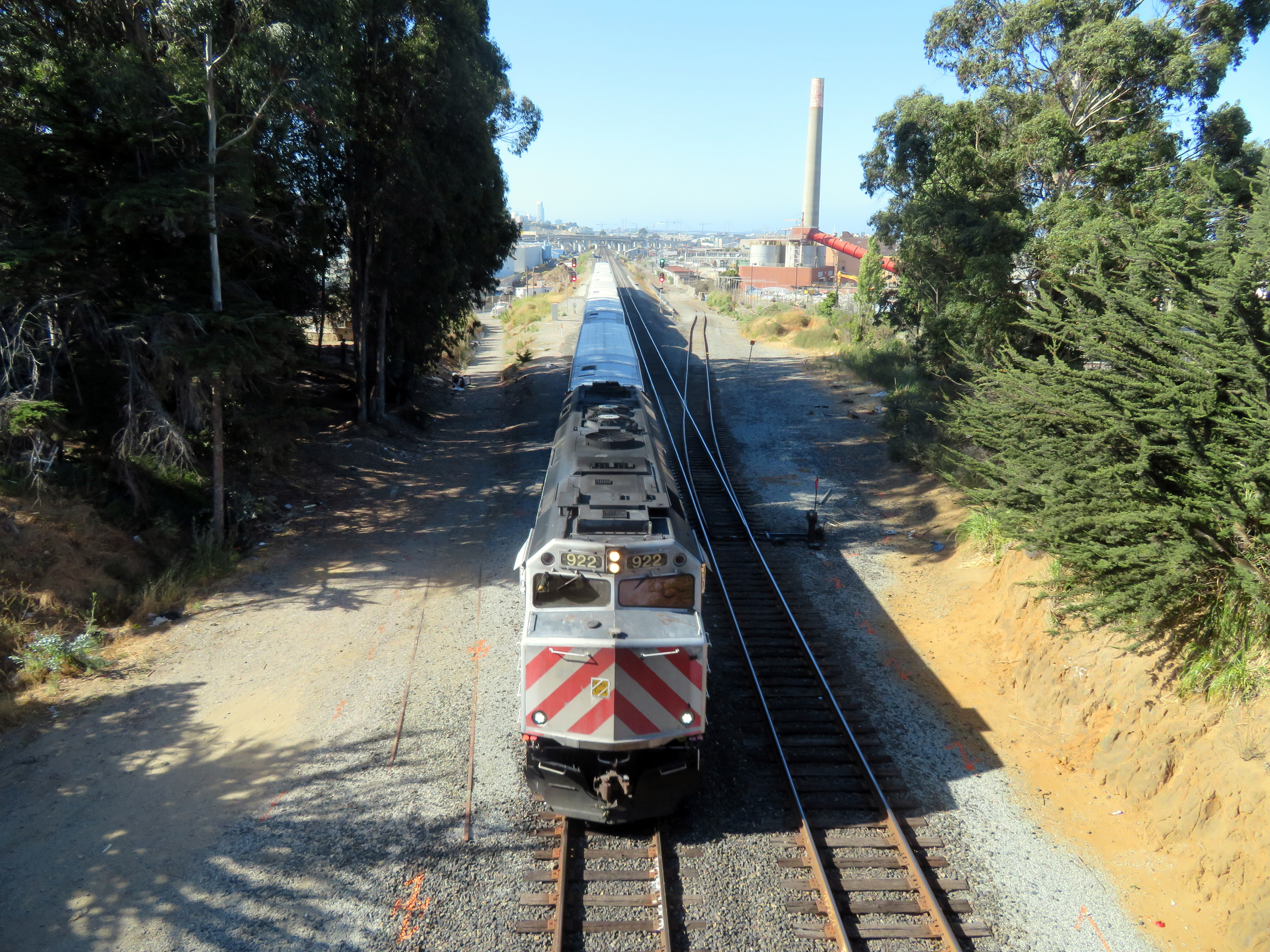
A southbound train passing the proposed station site (June 2018); the Quint Street Lead can be seen branching east from the northbound mainline.

When Caltrain was still being operated by Caltrans, a report was published in 1988 from a study to evaluate the feasibility of replacing Paul Avenue with a new station to the north at either Williams Avenue, Palou Avenue, or Evans Avenue. The report was prepared in conjunction with the effort to create a home port for USS Missouri (BB-63) in San Francisco at the Hunters Point Shipyard, and concluded that with the completion of the Downtown Rail Extension (now known as The Portal), daily ridership could increase to 2,400. However, without the downtown extension, ridership would be limited to less than 100. The preferred site was at Evans Avenue.

The Bayview Hunters Point Community Revitalization Concept Plan (March 2002) identified the Oakdale-Palou area as the community's preferred location for the Caltrain station. A 2005 feasibility study proposed a new station just north of Oakdale Avenue (37.738°N 122.3948°W) next to the City College of San Francisco Southeast Campus in Bayview, 1.0 mile (1.6 km) north of the former Paul Avenue station. The new station would have platforms passing over Quint, and bus stops for four lines would be located within walking distance of the new station. Just north of Oakdale, freight trains are routed east along the Quint Street Lead, which branches from the main line, to the Intermodal Freight Rail Cargo Transfer Facility near Piers 90–96. A follow-up study in 2014 predicted daily ridership of around 2,350. In the vicinity of the proposed station, the Caltrain line is grade-separated from Oakdale (which passes over the rail line) and Quint. Prior to 2016, the rail line was carried over Quint on a steel bridge originally constructed for the Bayshore Cutoff in the early 1900s. In preparation for a new Oakdale station, the bridge, which was structurally deficient, was removed on April 30 and replaced by a berm completed in July 2016, which severed Quint between Oakdale and Jerrold. A new road has been proposed on land belonging to Union Pacific west of the tracks, to reconnect Quint to Jerrold.
