= Old Fisherman's Grotto =

- Interactive map of Old Fisherman's Grotto

Restaurant information
- Established: 1950
- Owner: Chris Shake
- Previous owners: Sabu Shake, Sr.
- Head chef: Juan Ponce
- Food type: Seafood; Steakhouse; Italian
- Location: 39 Fishermans Wharf, Monterey, Monterey County, California, 93940, United States
- Coordinates: 36.604388°N 121.892926°W
- Reservations: Yes
- Website: www.oldfishermansgrotto.com

Old Fisherman's Grotto is a restaurant in Fisherman's Wharf, Monterey, California. Old Fisherman's Grotto was opened in 1950 by restaurateur Sabu Shake, Sr. The restaurant serves seafood, steaks and Italian cuisine. Their Monterey Style Clam Chowder was named best clam chowder in Monterey 23 years in a row.

== History ==
Old Fisherman's Grotto was founded in 1950 by restaurateur Sabu Shake, Sr. Originally from Karachi, Pakistan, Shake moved to the Monterey area, with his wife Isabella, in 1954, where the couple raised their six children, all boys. Shake worked as a dishwasher at a restaurant on Fisherman's Wharf. He eventually became a cook before quitting in 1958 to purchase a small restaurant on the Wharf, which would become Old Fisherman's Grotto. During his time as owner and operator of the restaurant Mother Teresa, Jim Carrey and Benazir Bhutto dined at the restaurant. Shake worked directly with local fisherman and cattlemen and Salinas Valley produce growers to ensure the restaurant provided local menu items.

Shake died on December 5, 1998, of cancer. Today, the restaurant is owned and operated by Shake's son, Chris Shake.

In 2016, Chris Shake requested to demolish the restaurant when the lease expires in 2021. According to Shake's lawyer, the rationale behind the request was because the city of Monterey was unable to secure a long-term lease for the restaurant. Shake wants to extend the restaurant's lease to 2041.

== Design and ambiance ==
Old Fisherman's Grotto's exterior is mustard yellow, black and white, the latter primarily comprising checkered and striped accents, including an awning. A statue of Sabu Shake, Sr. stands outside the restaurant by a menu, displayed by the entrance. The restaurant operates a seafood market, the Grotto Fish Market, which is connected to the restaurant.

The restaurant's interior is dark with large windows overlooking the Monterey Bay harbor. The decor has a nautical style. Booths, with tufted leather, and tables are pre-set with wine glasses, white linen napkins, flowers and a bottle of Pellegrino.

Restaurant waitstaff wear black suits with white shirts and bowties. Frank Sinatra is played on the inhouse music system.

== Cuisine ==
Old Fisherman's Grotto serves seafood, steaks and Italian cuisine. The restaurant was one of the first approved by Seafood Watch. The restaurant serves traditional Monterey Bay-area dishes, including grilled Castroville artichokes, abalone, Monterey Bay-caught calamari, sand dabs, and clam chowder. Meals are served with sourdough bread.

Appetizers include crab cakes served with tartar sauce and fruit.

Main entrees include scallops sauteed in butter, steamed Dungeness crab, paella, fish and chips, filet mignon, surf and turf, chicken marsala, skirt steak with maple-soy glaze, seafood in a cream sauce ("Linguini Isabella"), teriyaki chicken, cioppino, grilled wild salmon, and calamari eggplant parmesan. Main dishes are served with sides, a starch (e.g. risotto, couscous) and a vegetable (e.g. bok choy).

After guests finish their main dishes, restaurant waitstaff wheel out a tray of desserts for guests to peruse. An average of sixteen desserts are offered, including creme brulee, tiramisu, chocolate cannoli cake, key lime pie, and cheesecake.

=== Monterey Style Clam Chowder ===
The restaurant's house speciality is clam chowder, which they call "Monterey Style Clam Chowder." The restaurant claims to have invented this type of chowder, which Frommer's described as being similar to New England clam chowder. The chowder has been named the best clam chowder in Monterey 15 years in a row by Monterey County Weekly and won the 2010 Monterey Wine Festival award for best chowder. The chowder has won first place in the West Coast Chowder Competition. The cream-based soup is thick, with clams, including Quahog clams, potatoes, garlic and onion. The recipe is only known by four living people, including the restaurants chef, Juan Ponce. It's served in a cup, bowl or in a sourdough bread bowl. The restaurant sells cans of chowder.

== Reception ==
Pauline Frommer reviewed the restaurant, saying "If you want to eat at the Wharf, you can’t do better than the Old Fisherman’s Grotto." Frommer also called the restaurant a "family tradition" for locals, who wait in line outside to eat at the restaurant. Culturel Trip named Old Fisherman's Grotto one of the top 10 restaurants in Old Monterey. The restaurant has won "best calamari" in Monterey County twice and best restaurant on Fisherman's Wharf in 2018.

=== Child policy ===
The restaurant has a strict policy around children, with a sign reading "No strollers - No high chairs - No booster chairs - Children crying or making loud noises are a distraction to other diners, and as such are not allowed in the dining room." The sign was reviewed by an attorney so that the sign does not violate discrimination laws. The restaurant experiences both backlash from people with children and support from those without. Diners seeking a child-free dining experience actively seek out the restaurant, which is located in a tourist area popular with families with children. When the sign was reported on social media a boycott was launched against the restaurant. A media frenzy ensued and over 1,200 stories were made about the policy including on CNN, NBC, Fox News, ABC, Eater, International Business Times and more. Local Monterey journalists called the controversy "Babygate."

== See also ==
- List of seafood restaurants
