= Del Monte station =

Former rail station in Monterey, California, US

Del Monte
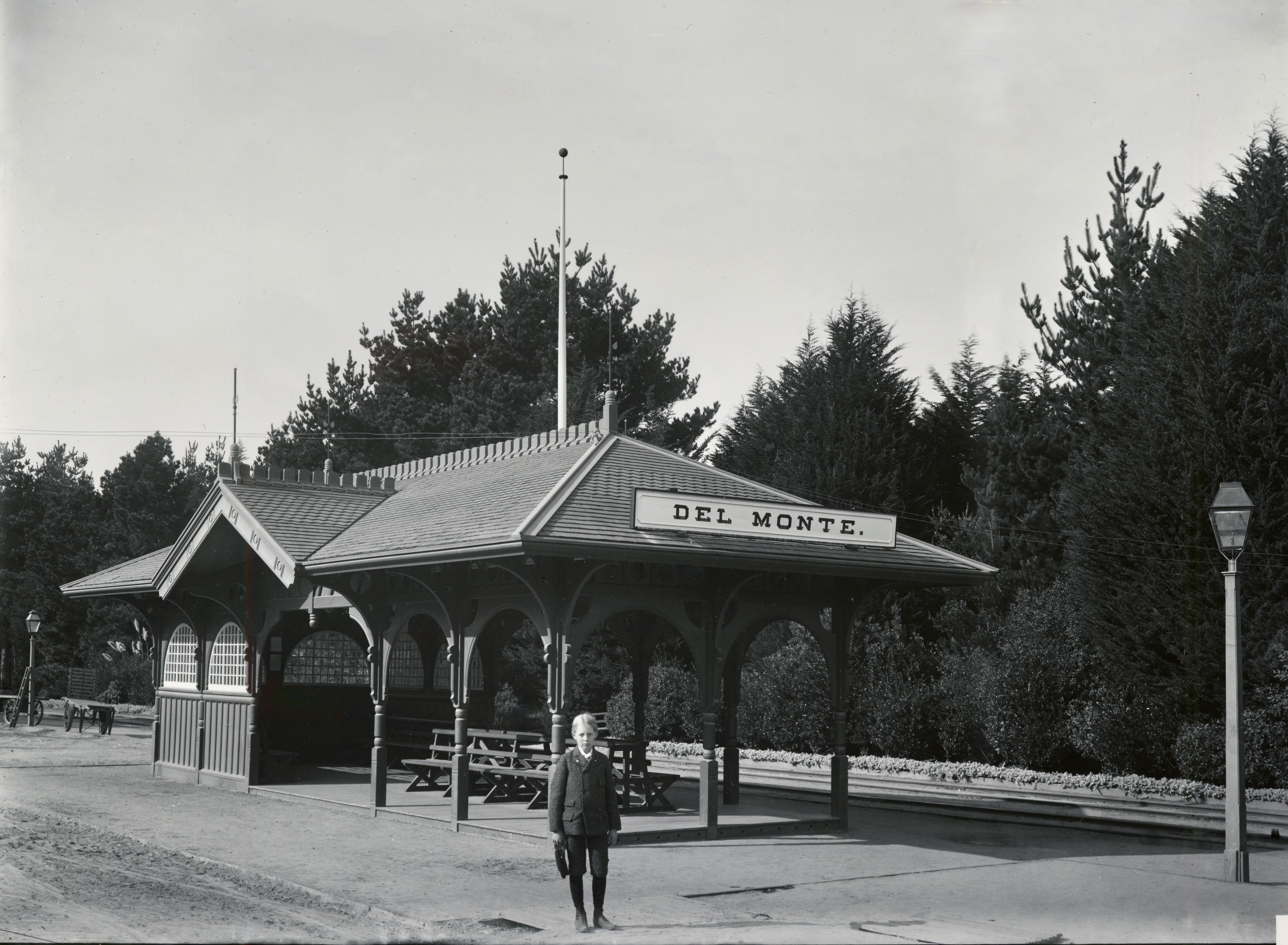
- Del Monte station around 1900

General information
- Location: Del Monte Avenue; Del Monte, Monterey, California, US
- Coordinates: 36.60027°N 121.87468°W
- Line(s): Monterey Branch
- Platforms: 1 side platform
- Tracks: 1

Construction
- Architect: Arthur Brown Sr.
- Architectural style: Queen Anne

History
- Opened: 1880
- Closed: April 30, 1971
- Rebuilt: 1924

Services
Preceding station	Southern Pacific Railroad	Following station
Monterey toward Pacific Grove	Monterey Branch Line	Seaside toward Castroville
Monterey Terminus	Del Monte	Seaside toward San Francisco

Del Monte station was a passenger railroad depot for Del Monte, Monterey, California. The station was named after the former resort Hotel Del Monte, now the Naval Postgraduate School. The station was completed in 1880 on Del Monte Avenue, next to the hotel. Operating under the Southern Pacific Railroad, the station was in use until the cancellation of the Del Monte train route on April 30, 1971, when Amtrak took control of passenger rail services across the United States.

== History ==
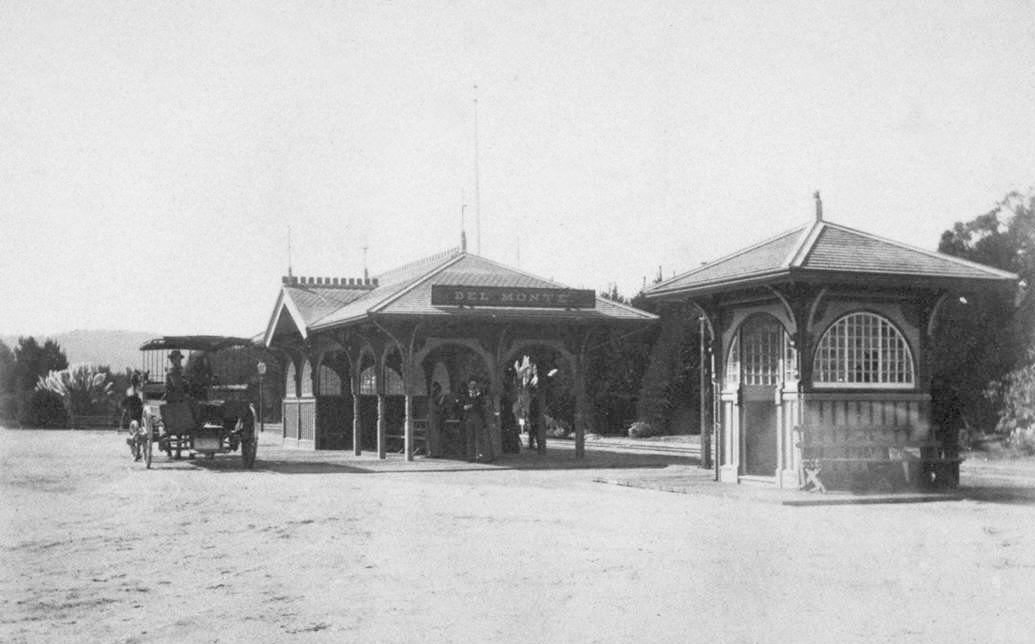
Del Monte station around 1891

Upon the construction of the Hotel Del Monte in 1880, designed by architect Arthur Brown Sr., a modest station was erected 0.25 miles (0.40 km) north of the hotel grounds, between the Monterey Bay and Del Monte Avenue. The initial stop in Monterey for travelers journeying by train from San Francisco was the Del Monte station. Only guests of the hotel disembarked at Del Monte; Monterey station was the primary Monterey stop.

Resembling the hotel's Queen Anne-style design, the station featured lattice work and a wooden-framed arch-covered walkway. Hotel guests could arrive at the Del Monte train station and walk or drive to the hotel. Del Monte station only served passengers; it was the only station on the line without freight facilities

On April 30, 1891, during his tour of the United States, President Benjamin Harrison arrived via the Presidential train at the Del Monte station when staying at the hotel.

On September 27, 1924, the Hotel Del Monte was destroyed by fire. It was rebuilt in 1926 in the Spanish Colonial Revival architecture style. As a result a second Del Monte passenger station was rebuilt to replicate the new architectural style. The station consisted of an open-air passenger shelter with Spanish arches on all sides, and a terra cotta tile roof. The redesigned Del Monte experienced a brief period of prosperity. However, during World War II, the property was acquired for military purposes, culminating in its purchase alongside adjacent land by the Naval Postgraduate School. This marked the conclusion of the railroad hotel era, though the station remained in use.

The last passenger service to the station was the Del Monte, which made its last trips on April 30, 1971. Del Monte station and other stations on the line were demolished afterward. All that remains is the foundation of the depot, marked by a historical plaque.
