= 22nd Street (San Francisco) =

Street in San Francisco, California, United States

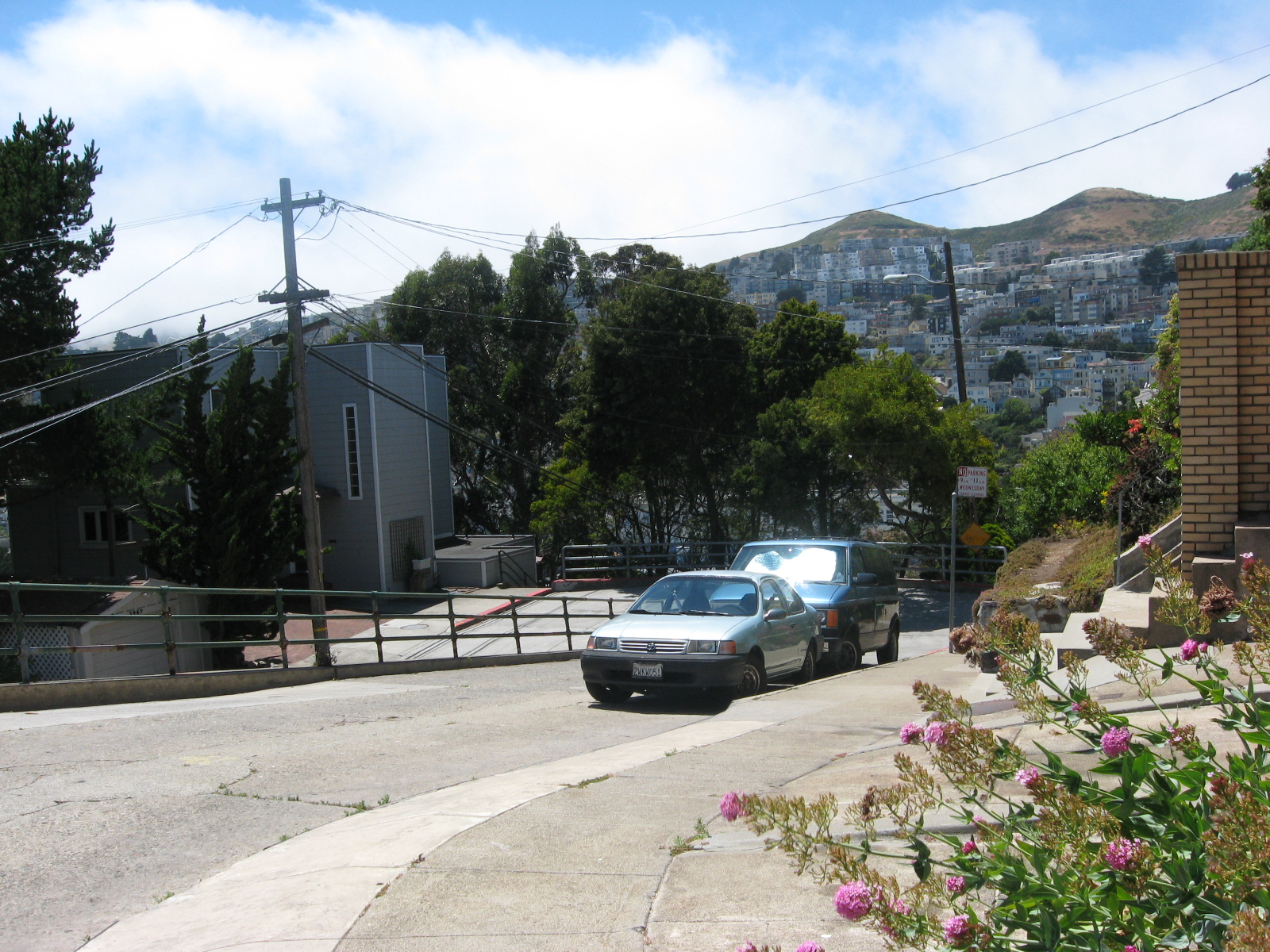
- The switchback at 22nd Street and Collingwood. The steps to Diamond and 22nd are ahead in the Noe Valley area.
- Interactive map of 22nd Street
- Length: 2.9 mi (4.7 km)
- Coordinates: 37.754782°N 122.427703°W

22nd Street is an east–west street passing through the Noe Valley, Mission, and Potrero Hill districts of San Francisco, California. The street is discontinuous and exists in several sections: the main western section between Hoffman Avenue and the Bayshore Freeway, a segment from Vermont Street to Wisconsin Street, a short alley off of Missouri Street, and an eastern section from Texas Street to Pier 70. Below the elevated Interstate 280 and at-grade eastern section lies 22nd Street station, Caltrain's only station beneath ground level.

== Steepness ==
The street includes one of the steepest city blocks in San Francisco. In the 250-foot block from Vicksburg to Church Streets in the Noe Valley neighborhood, the city map shows a 79-foot descent along the south side of the street (78 1/2 feet (23.9 m) along the north side) for an average grade of just over 31%, about the same as the steepest block of Filbert Street in San Francisco. (Both streets are one-way down; bottom of the 22nd St hill at 37.7549°N 122.4279°W. A 1956 view seems to show a two-way street.)

== Slow street and bicycle route ==
In 2022, the San Francisco Municipal Transportation Agency (SFMTA) board voted to add a section of 22nd Street to the city's Slow Streets program. The slow portion will run between Chattanooga Street in Noe Valley and Bryant Street in the Mission District once implemented. As of April 2024, the SFMTA had not provided a timeline for the project.

The SFMTA designated a similar section of 22nd Street as an east-west bicycle route, between Chattanooga Street and Potrero Avenue, on the agency's 2019 bike map.

== See also ==
- 22nd Street (Caltrain station)
- Baldwin Street, Dunedin — the world's steepest residential street.
