= Del Monte, Monterey, California =

Del Monte
- Neighborhood of Monterey, California
- Location in California
- Coordinates: 36°36′03″N 121°52′09″W
- Country: United States
- State: California
- County: Monterey County
- City: Monterey
- Elevation: 16 ft (5 m)

Del Monte (Spanish for "Of The Mountain") is a district of Monterey, California. It was formerly an independent unincorporated community in Monterey County. It is located in the east part of Monterey, at an elevation of 16 feet (5 m).

== History ==
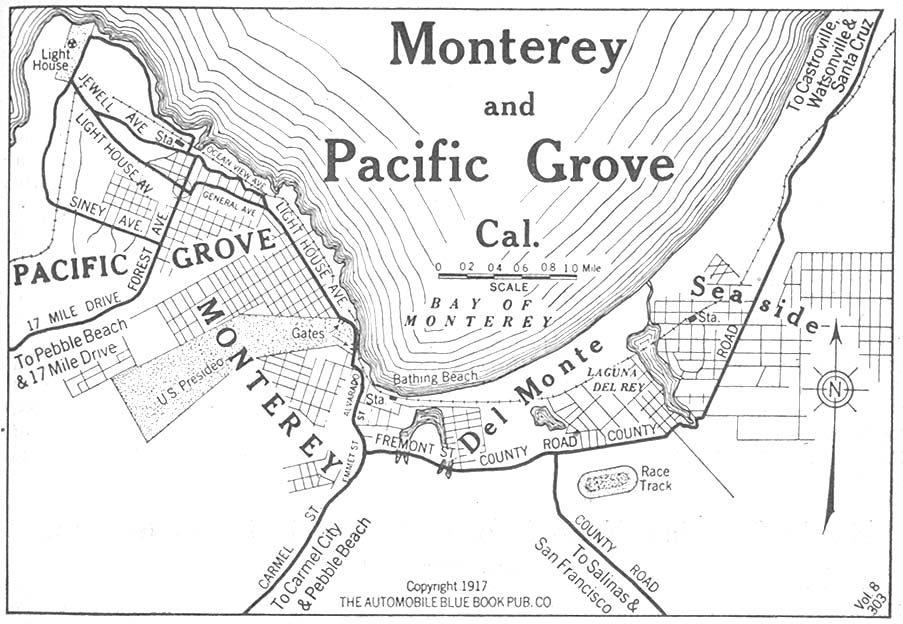
Monterey Bay area in 1917

Del Monte is Spanish for "of the mountain." The name came from the former luxury resort Hotel Del Monte (now the Naval Postgraduate School). Charles Crocker, one of California's big four railroad barons, established the resort through Southern Pacific Railroad's property division, Pacific Improvement Company. The first hotel was completed in 1880, with a nearby depot on Monterey Bay. The Del Monte included the hotel, parkland, polo grounds, and golf course. The property extended south and southeast of the hotel and included gardens, parkland, polo grounds, race track, and golf course. The Del Monte development also included a scenic drive from the hotel to another portion of the resort, Pebble Beach, on the Monterey Peninsula. A portion of that drive is preserved as 17-mile drive.

The Delmonte post office operated at the Hotel Del Monte from 1882 to 1883. The Del Monte post office opened in 1901, closed for a period in 1911, and closed for good in 1951.

The City of Monterey annexed Del Monte in 1948.

== Government ==
In the California State Legislature, Del Monte is in the 17th senatorial district, represented by Democrat John Laird, and in the 29th Assembly district, represented by Democrat Robert Rivas.

In the United States House of Representatives, Del Monte is in California's 20th congressional district, represented by Republican Vince Fong.

== See also ==
- Del Monte station
