= South San Francisco station (Caltrain) =

Train station in South San Francisco, California, U.S.

South San Francisco
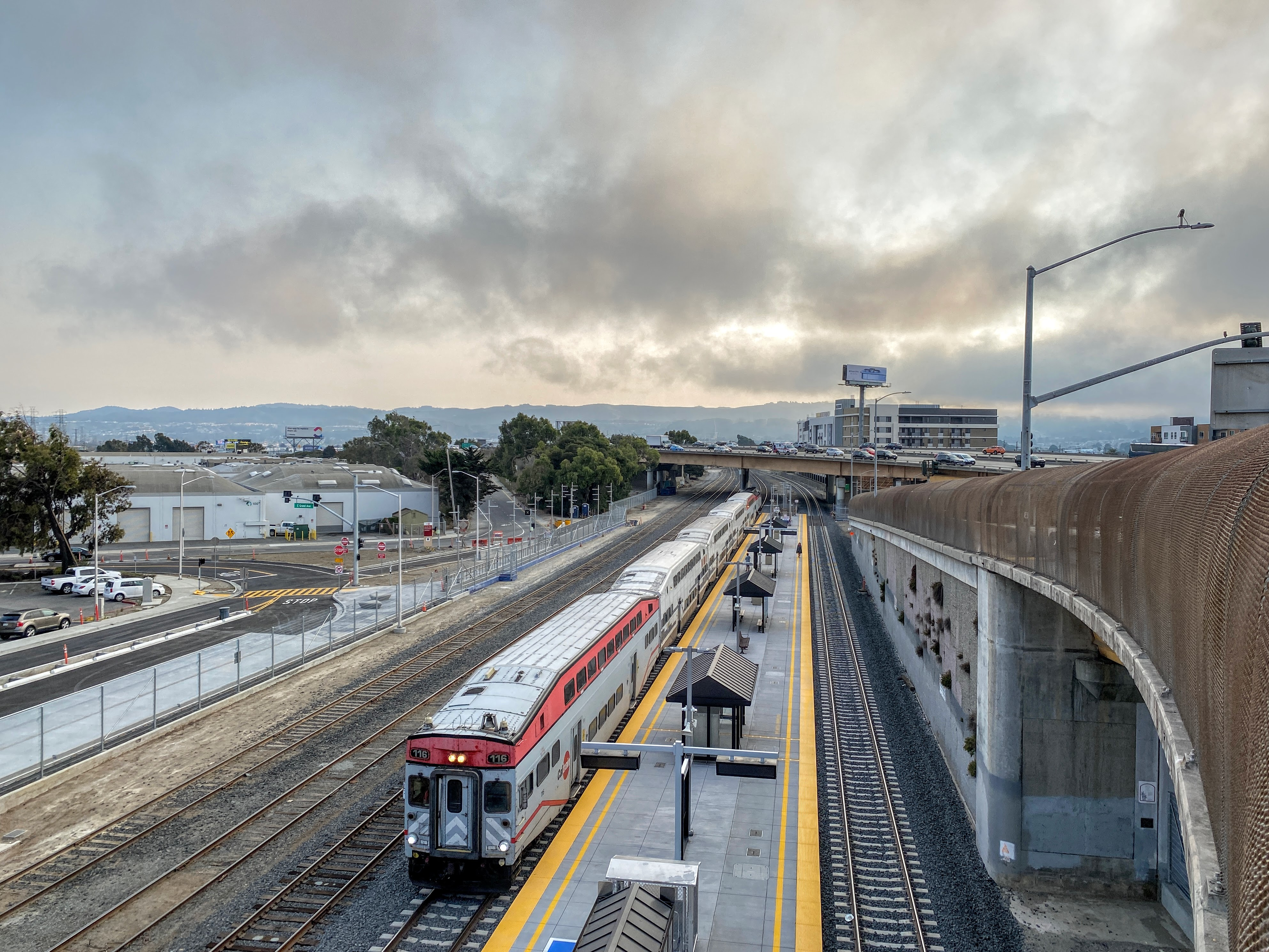
- A northbound train at South San Francisco station in 2021

General information
- Location: 590 Dubuque Avenue
- Coordinates: 37°39′18.0″N 122°24′21.5″W
- Owner: Peninsula Corridor Joint Powers Board (PCJPB)
- Line: PCJPB Peninsula Subdivision
- Platforms: 1 island platform
- Tracks: 5
- Connections: Commute.org: Genesis One Tower Place, Oyster Point, Utah-Grand; SamTrans: 38, 130, 141, 292, 397

Construction
- Parking: 81 spaces; paid
- Cycle facilities: 24 racks, 12 lockers
- Accessible: Yes

Other information
- Fare zone: 1

History
- Opened: 1892
- Rebuilt: 1909; 2017-2022
- Electrified: 2024

Passengers
- FY 2025: 692 per weekday ▲66%

Services
Preceding station	Caltrain	Following station
Bayshore toward San Francisco	Local	San Bruno toward San Jose Diridon or Tamien
22nd Street toward San Francisco	Limited	Millbrae toward San Jose Diridon
22nd Street toward San Francisco	Express	Millbrae toward San Jose Diridon
Bayshore toward San Francisco	Weekend Local	San Bruno toward San Jose Diridon or Tamien
Former services
Preceding station	Caltrain	Following station
Bayshore toward San Francisco	Local (L1)	San Bruno toward San Jose Diridon or Tamien
Bayshore toward San Francisco	Weekend Local (L2)	San Bruno toward San Jose Diridon or Tamien
San Francisco Terminus	Limited (L3)	Millbrae toward San Jose Diridon, Tamien or Gilroy
22nd Street (reverse peak) toward San Francisco	Limited (L3)	Millbrae toward San Jose Diridon, Tamien or Gilroy
Preceding station	Southern Pacific Railroad	Following station
Butler Road toward San Francisco	Coast Line	San Bruno toward Los Angeles
Location

South San Francisco station is a Caltrain station in South San Francisco, California. The station is on the east side of the Bayshore Freeway (U.S. 101), east and south of the curved Grand Avenue overpass, and north of where the freeway crosses over the tracks. Downtown South San Francisco is to the west, across the freeway. It previously underwent a substantial modernization and expansion project, completed in January 2022.

== Station layout ==
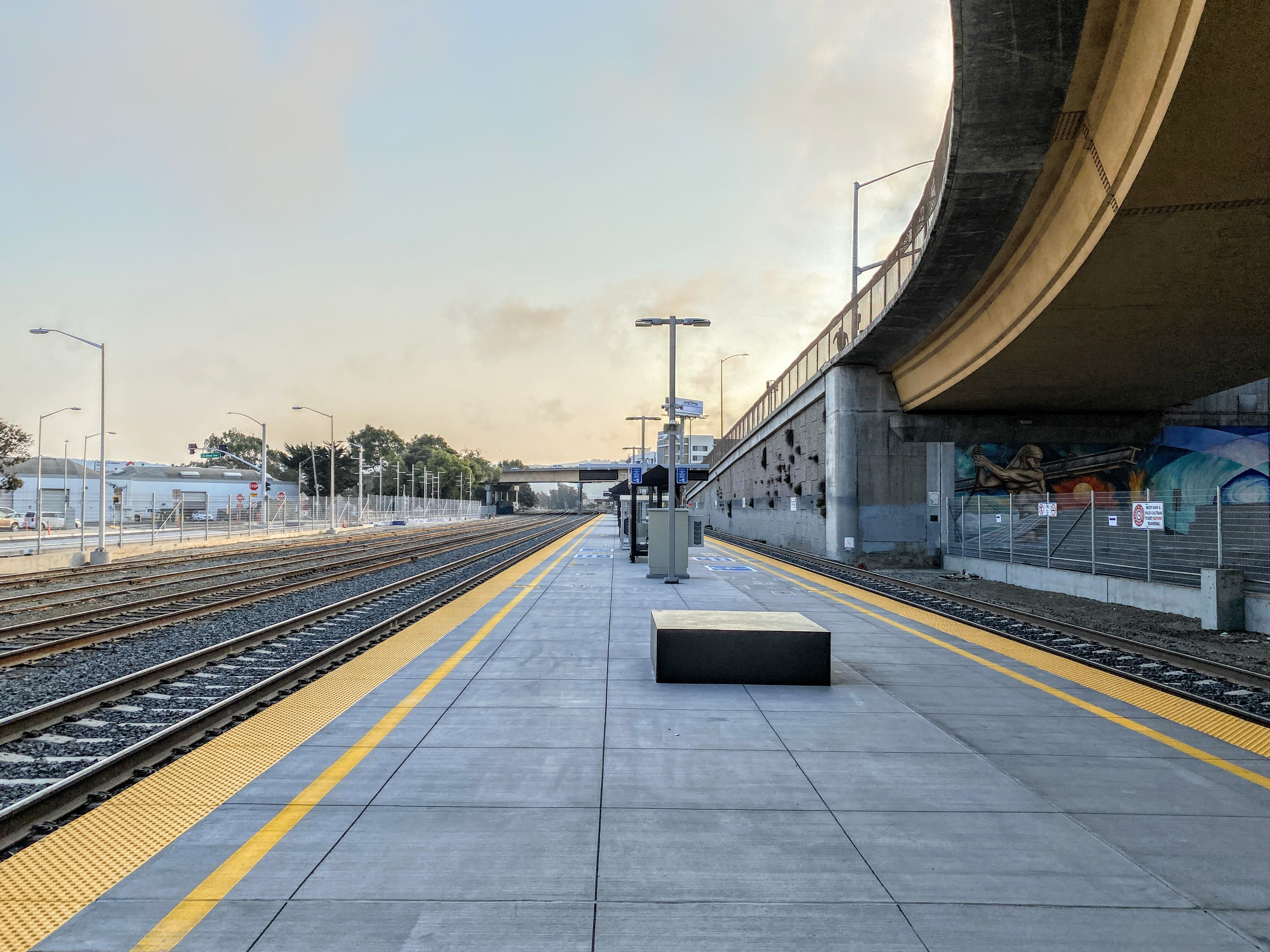
Looking south along the station platform. The mural Prometheus Brings Fire to Man by artist Nicolai Larsen is partially visible at right.

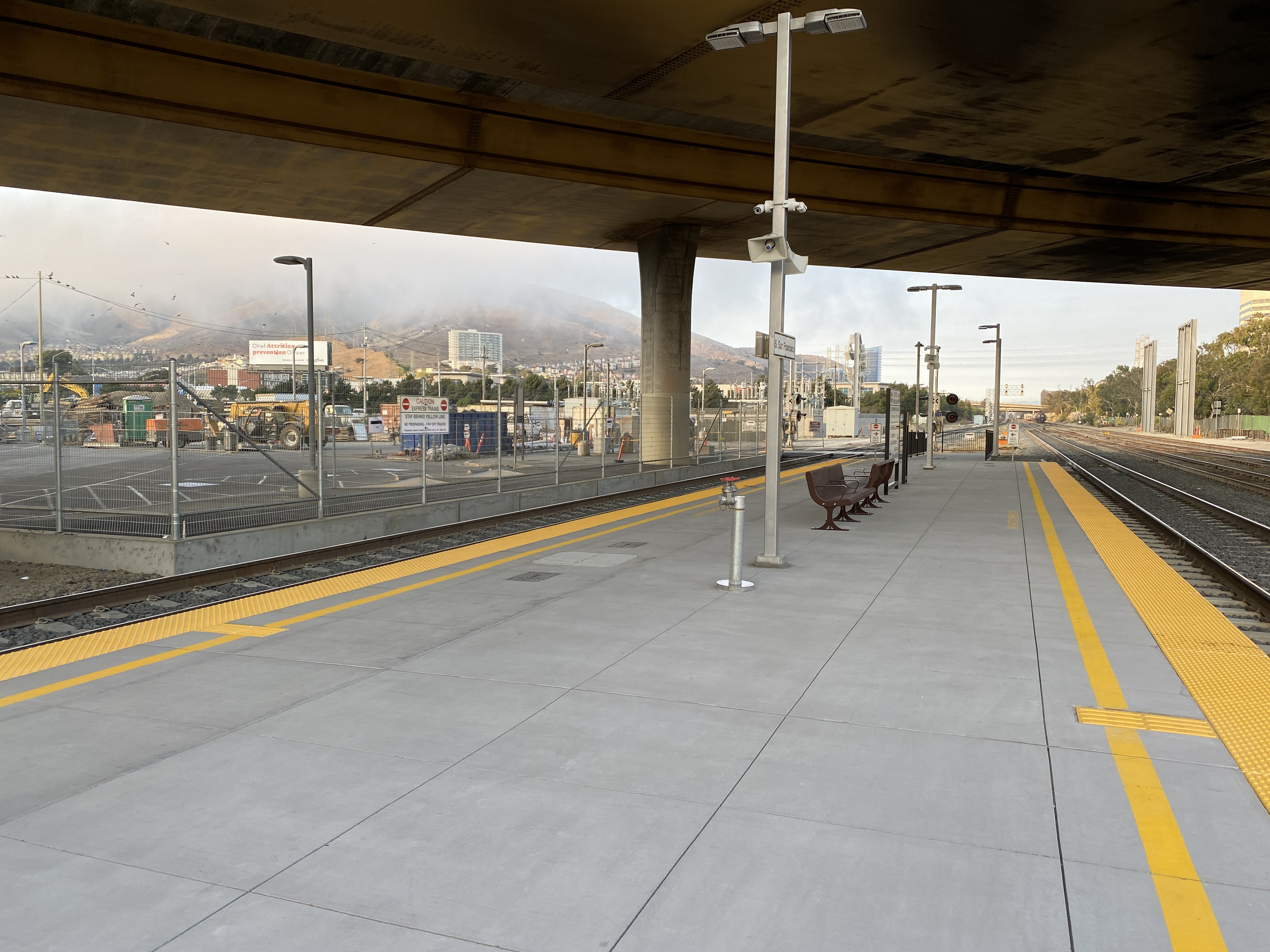
The northern end of the station platform, underneath the Grand Avenue overpass. The pedestrian crossing is at the far end, and the parking lot is behind the fence on the left.

The station features a single island platform. The main entrance is an underpass that connects the south end of the platform to Grand Avenue and Airport Boulevard on the west and East Grand Avenue and Poletti Way on the east. The west approach, providing direct access to the station from downtown South San Francisco, features a plaza with decorative lighting, and the east approach features an area for shuttle buses to pick up and drop off passengers. Passengers can also use a signalized and gated grade crossing (across the southbound track) between the parking lot on Dubuque Avenue and the north end of the platform. Automobiles can enter the parking lot by turning from the Grand Avenue overpass north onto Dubuque, just east of U.S. 101. A tall metal staircase descends to the parking lot from the Grand Avenue overpass at the intersection with Dubuque, though the more direct pedestrian underpass has obviated the need for passengers to use it. Several SamTrans routes stop near the western underpass entrance on Airport Boulevard. The south end of the parking lot features a large mural on the retaining wall for Grand Avenue entitled Prometheus Brings Fire to Man by artist Nicolai Larsen, painted in 1996.

== History ==
The Southern Pacific Bay Shore line to the stockyards at new South San Francisco opened in May 1892 — excursion trains were initially run every Sunday from San Francisco to promote real estate developments in the area. A small depot existed at least as early as 1898.

A depot for South San Francisco was built in 1909 shortly after the completion of the Bayshore Cutoff, with an entrance on Grand Avenue. The building was demolished in the late 1950s to make room for the Bayshore Freeway and replaced with a smaller brick building with an entrance off Dubuque. This building was demolished in the 1990s, though the platform remained in use. From 2017 to 2022, the station was completely reconstructed and relocated several hundred feet south of the prior location. The current station opened in September 2021, though amenities such as the pedestrian underpass and shuttle boarding area on Poletti Way were not completed until January 2022.

=== Former station ===
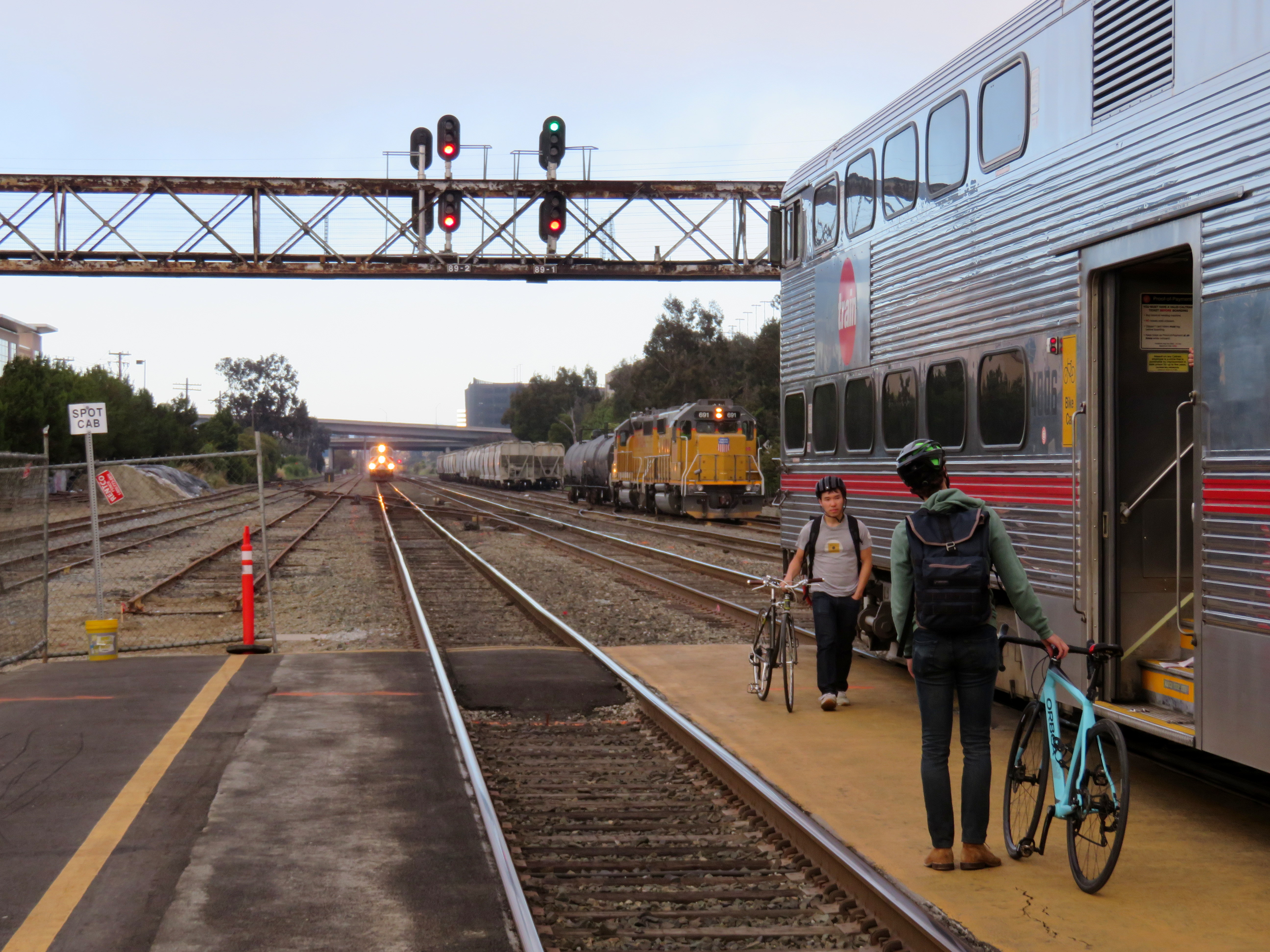
Prior to the new station's opening, a southbound train holds outside the station while passengers board a northbound train

The previous station was built before the Bayshore Freeway and retained many of the aspects common to older, unmodernized stations along the Peninsula Commute: the platforms were not accessible-compliant, and riders seeking to board a northbound train had to wait for the train to come to a complete stop before crossing the southbound track to a narrow boarding platform between the tracks. This necessitated the so-called "hold-out" rule (GCOR 6.30)—if a train was stopped for passengers, an approaching train on the other track had to wait outside the station. In 2012, a southbound Baby Bullet express train passing through the station narrowly avoided striking passengers for a northbound train stopped at South San Francisco. The Baby Bullet express did not have a scheduled stop at the station and had ignored the hold-out rule.

South San Francisco was the only hold-out rule station with regular service on weekdays (Broadway is open only on weekends, Atherton was open only on weekends until its closure in 2020, and College Park only has limited weekday service tailored to Bellarmine Prep opening and closing times), making it a bottleneck for rail traffic. The hold-out rule was finally lifted for South San Francisco when the new station platform opened in September 2021.

=== Modernization ===
2017 – 2022 South San Francisco station improvements Former Current
1 Former station platform under Grand Avenue overpass
2 Rebuilt platform
3 East underpass entrance & shuttle plaza
4 West underpass entrance & downtown plaza

In 1998, the City of South San Francisco prepared a concept plan to relocate the station southward so that trains would stop south of the Grand Avenue overpass in order to improve bus and pedestrian access to the station. This would allow buses currently stopping on Airport Boulevard (west of the Bayshore Freeway and the station) to directly service the station and open up access from the east for employer-provided and Commute.org shuttles.

In 2012 Caltrain and the City of South San Francisco began work on a Downtown Station Area Plan to redevelop the area around the station and make it easier to reach downtown from the station. The plan called for updating the station by renovating the southbound platform and extending it south, and building a new northbound platform to eliminate the "hold out" rule and to be accessible-compliant. It included a new 700 foot (210 m)-long island platform (between northbound and southbound tracks), a bus and shuttle drop-off area on Poletti Way, and an accessible-compliant pedestrian underpass to the new platform to connect with East Grand Avenue/Poletti Way (on the east) and Grand Avenue/Airport Boulevard (on the west). The planned west entrance also featured a new pedestrian plaza at the southeast corner of Airport Boulevard and Grand Avenue, on right-of-way previously used as a Caltrans storage yard. A new pedestrian gate crossing at the northern end of the new platform would provide access to the existing parking lot.

The plan was approved in February 2015 and was to be funded by $49.1 million in funds provided by San Mateo County Measure A, a half-cent sales tax approved by county voters in 2012. Peninsula Corridor Joint Powers Board contributed $4 million and South San Francisco contributed $9.2 million, including $3.3M to expand station property and remediate soil.

Although construction was scheduled to begin in 2016, the design was not finalized until December 2016, and groundbreaking for the modernization project was held on November 6, 2017 in a ceremony attended by State Senator Jerry Hill and South San Francisco Mayor Pradeep Gupta. The new station was projected to open in 2019, but was delayed to August 2020 after planned underground utility relocation work was determined to be a prerequisite for construction of the new pedestrian underpass. it was further delayed to summer 2021, then November 2021, and finally January 2022 due to the coronavirus pandemic.

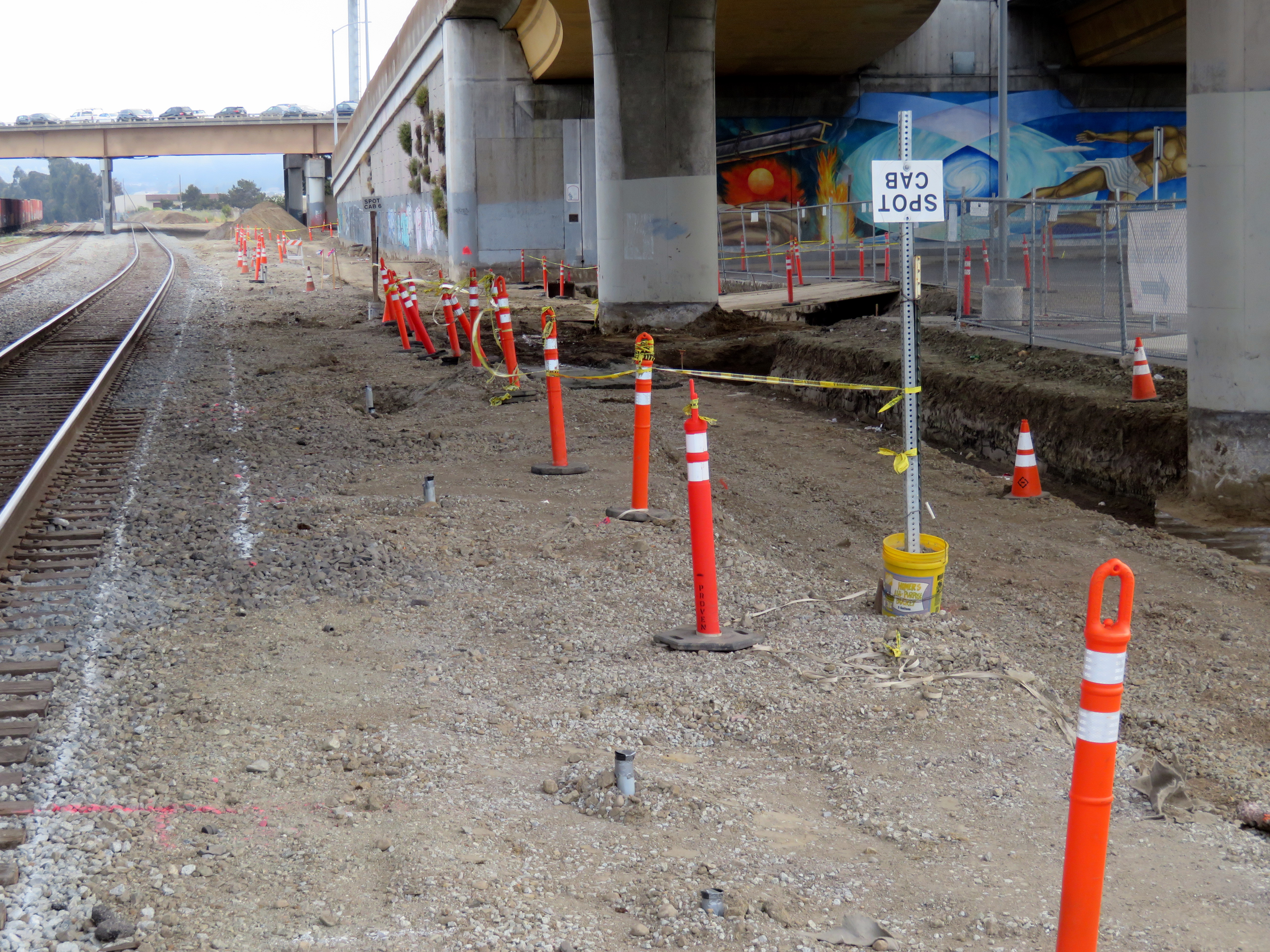
Platform construction, July 2018

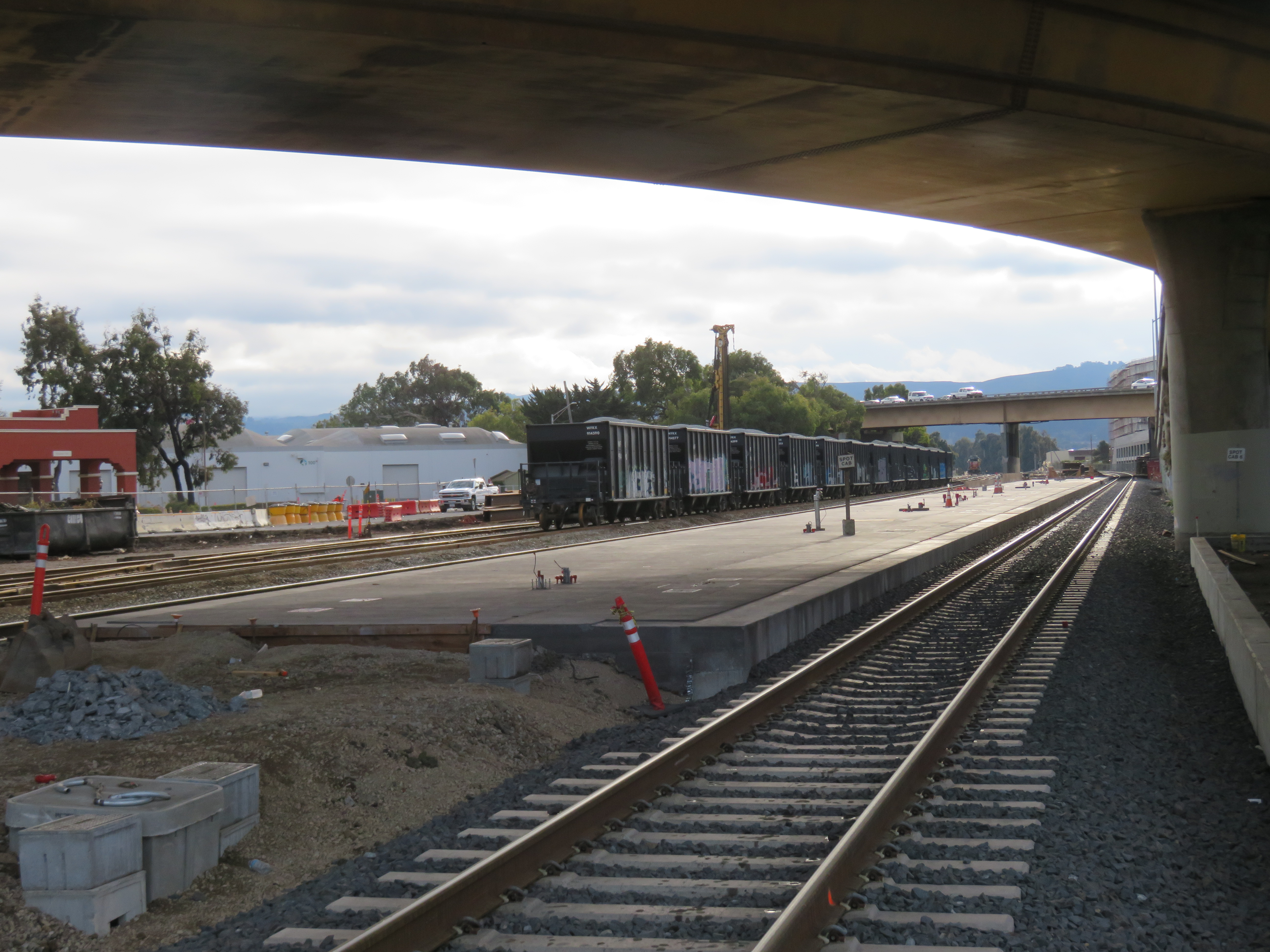
Platform construction, December 2020

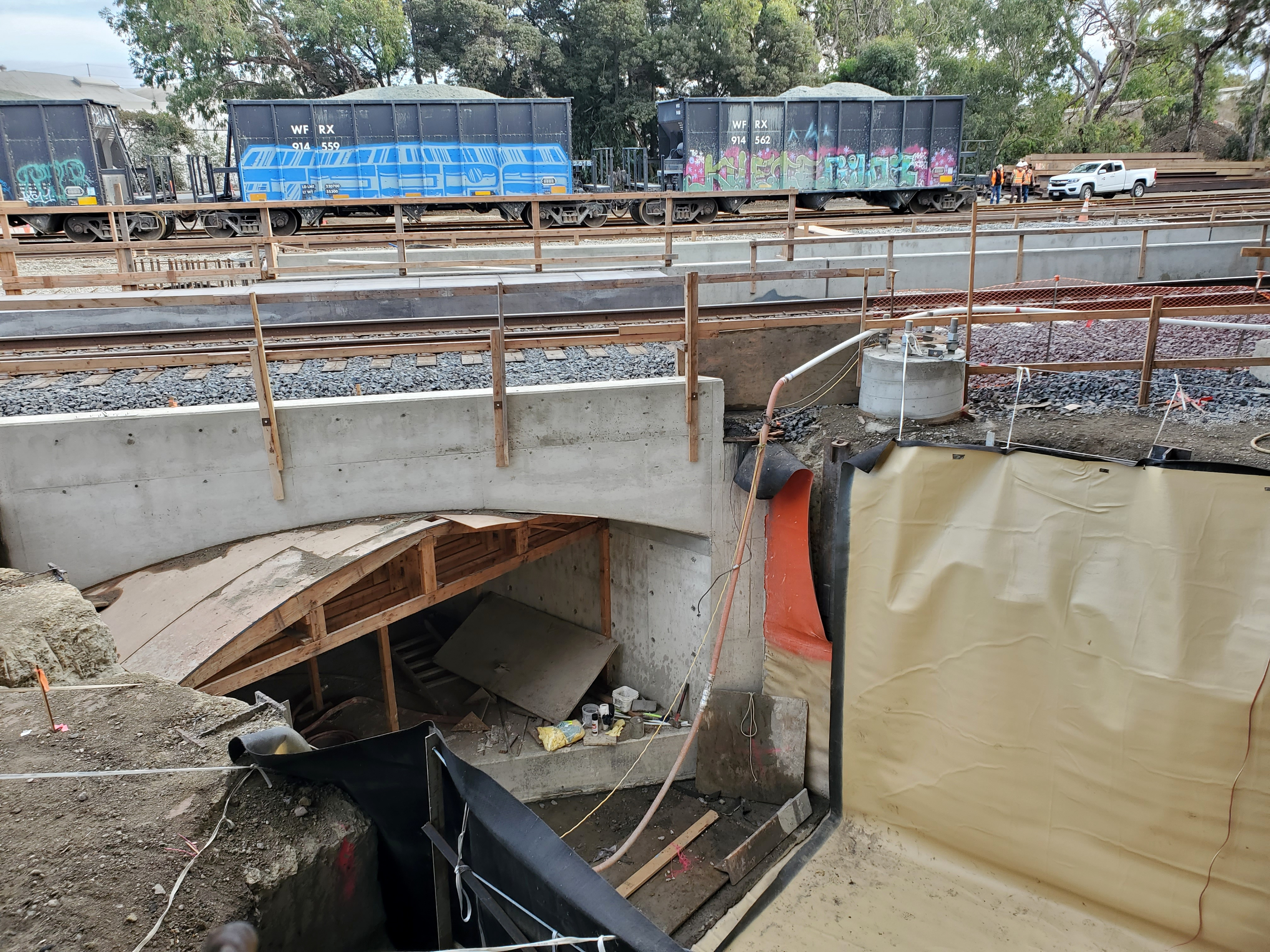
Underpass construction, December 2020
