= Artichoke Joe's Casino =

Gambling business in California, United States

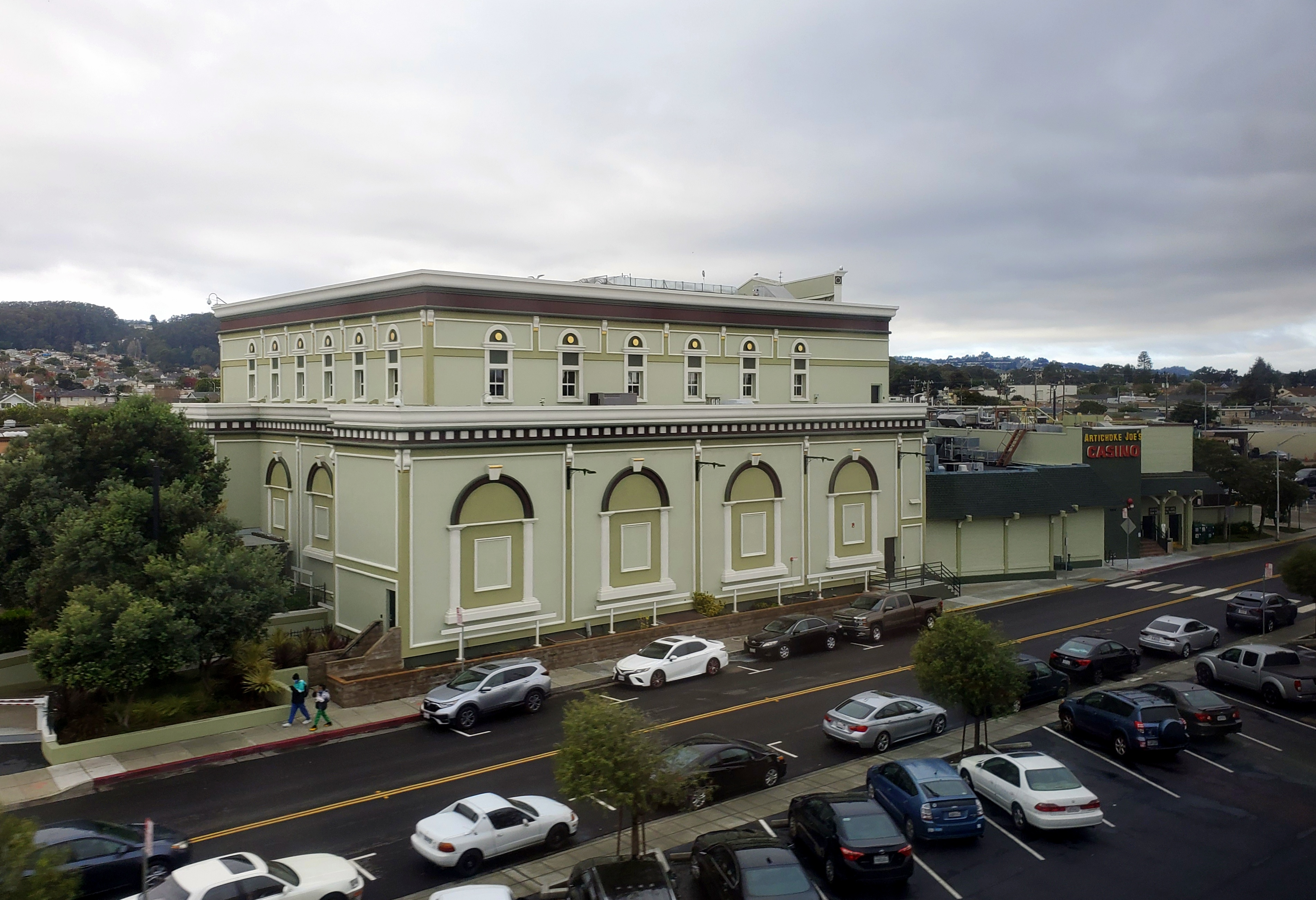
- The casino in December 2020
- Interactive map of Artichoke Joe's Casino
- Location: 659 Huntington Avenue San Bruno, California; 37°37′39″N 122°24′39″W
- Opened: 1916
- Casino type: card club
- Owner: Dennis Sammut
- Website: Official website

Artichoke Joe's Casino is a card club in San Bruno, California. The club is owned by Dennis Sammut and managed, in part, by Ron Cox, a former Foster City councilman.

== History ==
The establishment has been a family-founded and -owned business since 1916. The single room "Joe's Pool Parlor" was rebranded "Artichoke Joe's" in 1921, becoming a permanent fixture in San Bruno sporting life. Joseph Sammut opened his pool parlor and phone exchange in Al LoReaux's former plumbing shop. Most bets concerned horse races. Joe accepted any wager, no matter how large. Asked how he would pay off if he lost a big bet, he replied, "In artichoke leaves," hence the name. Still owned by the Sammut family, Artichoke Joe's is one of the city's oldest businesses.

The casino came to fame in the 1990s when the owner spent hundreds of thousands of dollars in an attempt to prevent potential loss of business due to the SFO BART extension construction project.
