= Monterey station =

Closed rail station in Monterey, California, United States

Monterey
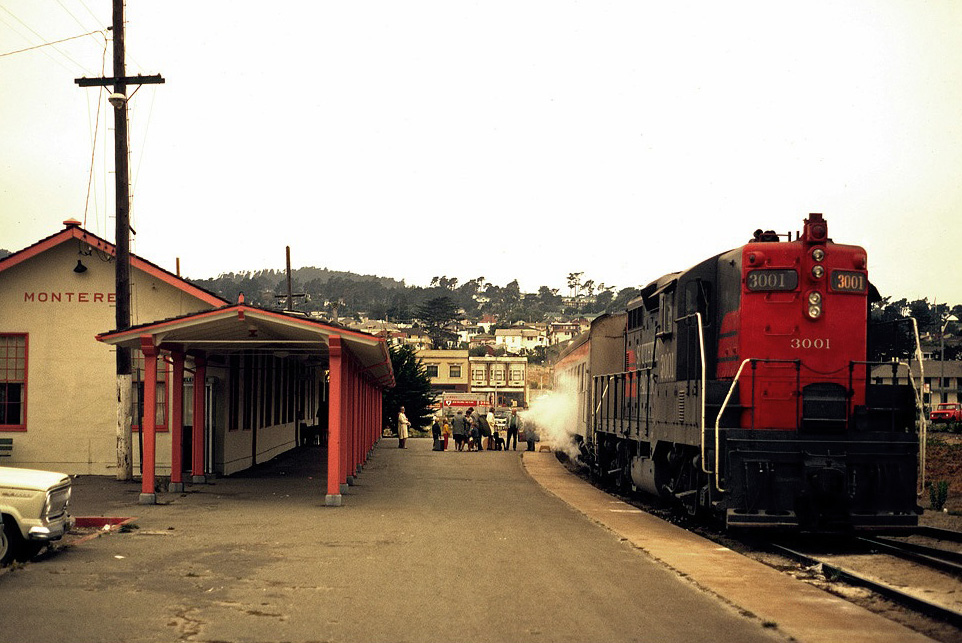
- A Del Monte train boarding riders at Monterey, September 1970

General information
- Coordinates: 36.601163°N 121.891282°W

History
- Closed: April 30, 1971
- Rebuilt: 1921

Services
Preceding station	Southern Pacific Railroad	Following station
Pacific Grove Terminus	Monterey Branch Line	Del Monte toward Castroville
Terminus	Del Monte	Del Monte toward San Francisco
Location

Monterey station was a train station in Monterey, California located close to Fisherman's Wharf. Originally served by the Monterey and Salinas Valley Railroad, the line was purchased by Southern Pacific on September 29, 1879. The Monterey and Pacific Grove Railway opened a streetcar extension to the station in 1892, providing local connections until about 1923. Southern Pacific constructed a new station building in 1921. Train service ended with the cancellation of the Del Monte after April 30, 1971, when Amtrak took over passenger rail services in the United States.

The depot was converted to retail space, and is occupied by a brewpub as of 2019.

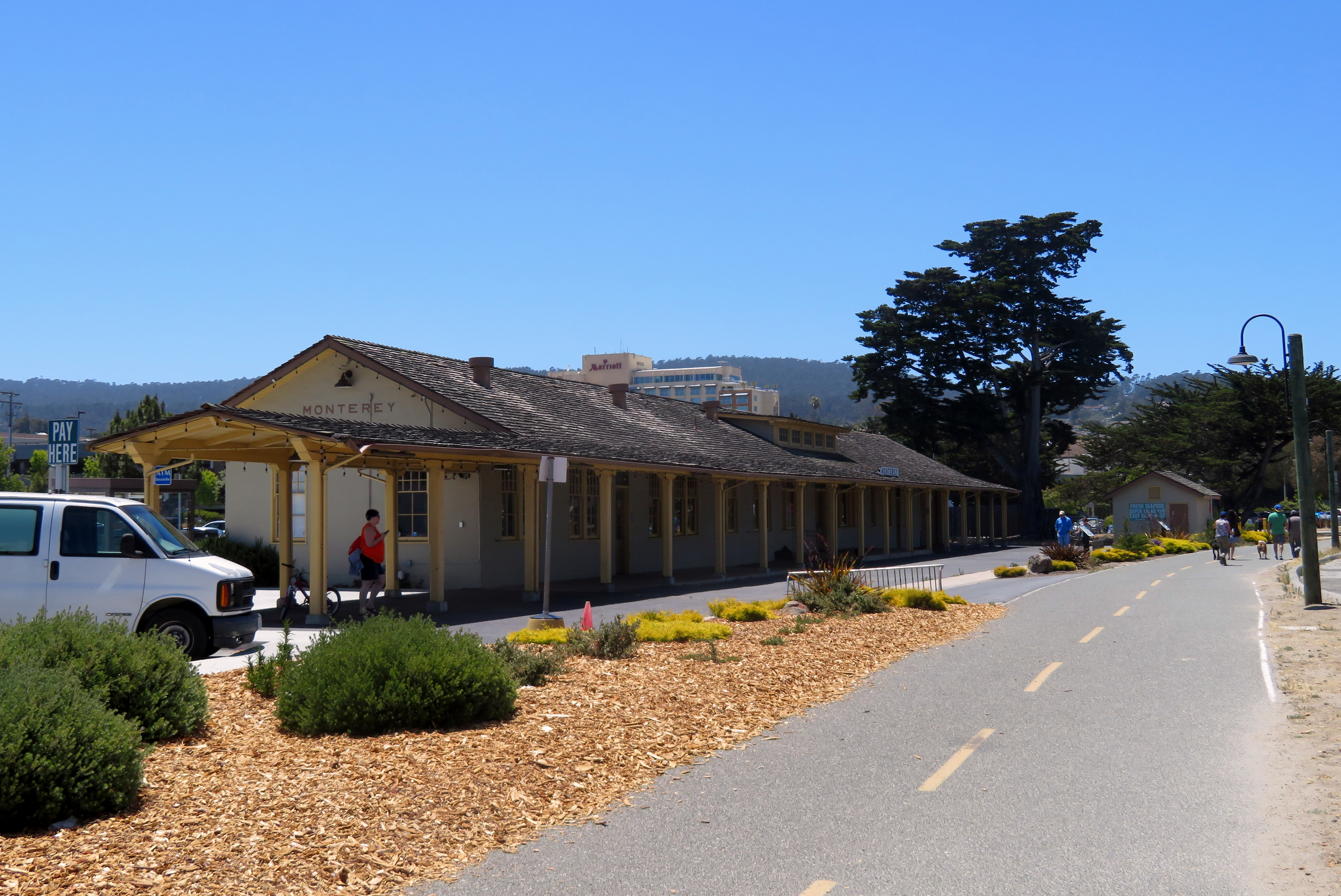
The station and rail trail in 2018

Restoration of service along the Monterey Branch Line was studied in the 1984–89 Caltrans passenger rail development plan. Later suggestions call for establishment of light rail service along the Monterey Branch Line, but the Monterey stop is planned to be located at the Custom House Plaza.
