= Fisherman's Wharf (Monterey, California) =

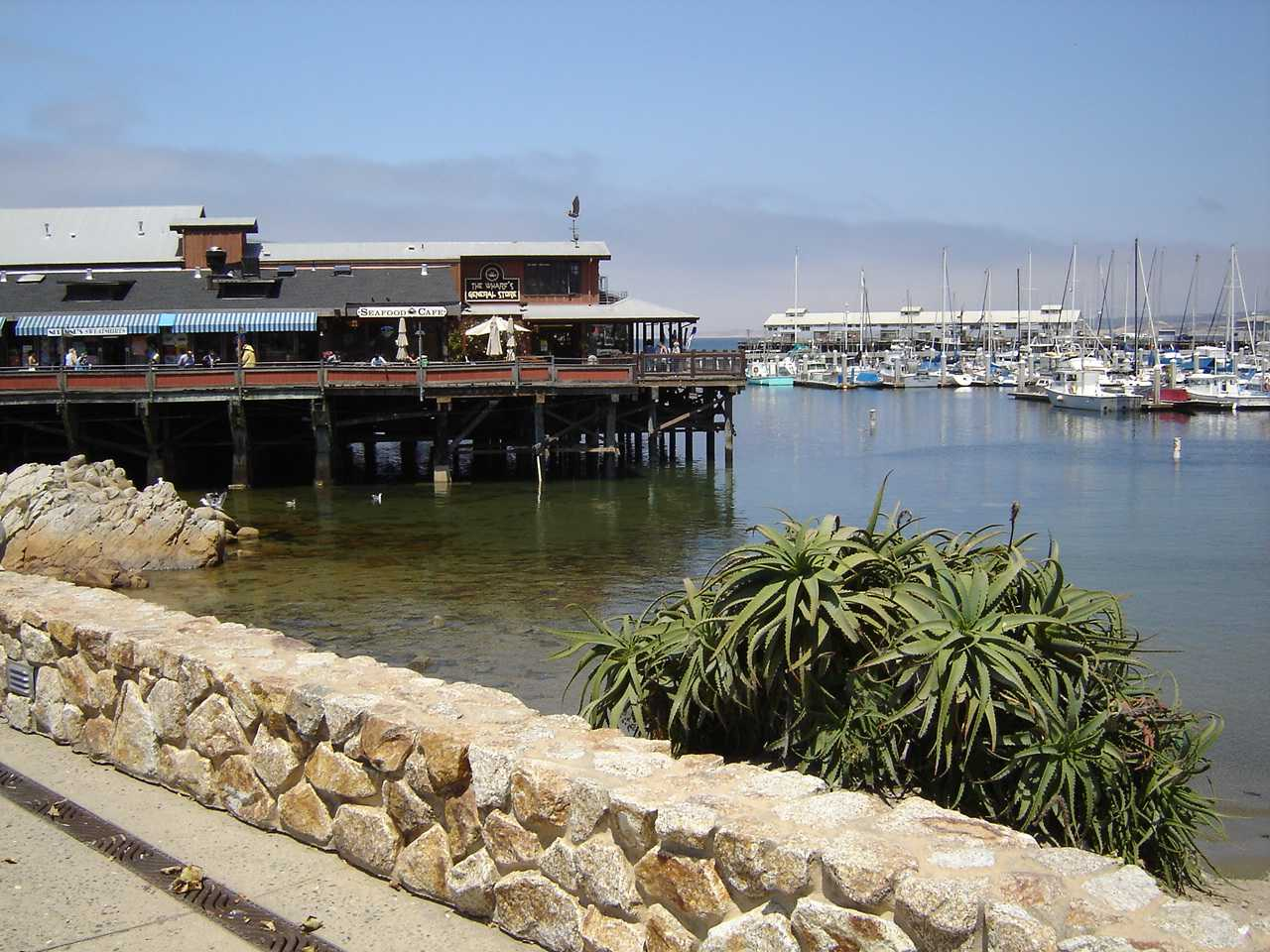
- Monterey Fishermans Wharf
- Interactive map of Fisherman's Wharf
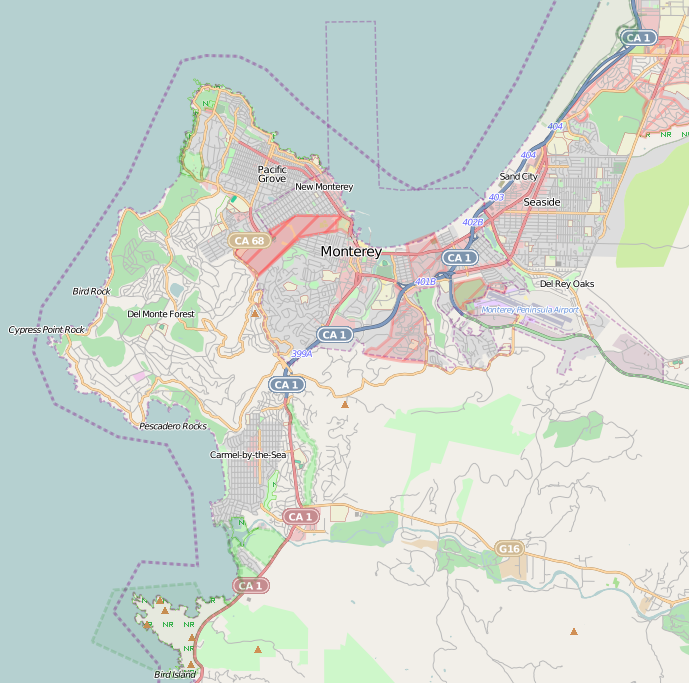
- Location within Monterey Peninsula
- Native name: Municipal Wharf No. 2

Location
- Country: United States
- Location: Monterey, California
- Coordinates: 36°36′16″N 121°53′34″W

Details
- Opened: 1926; 100 years ago
- Owned by: City of Monterey
- Size: 1,750 ft (530 m)
- Draft depth: 26 ft (7.9 m)

Statistics
- Website www.montereywharf.com

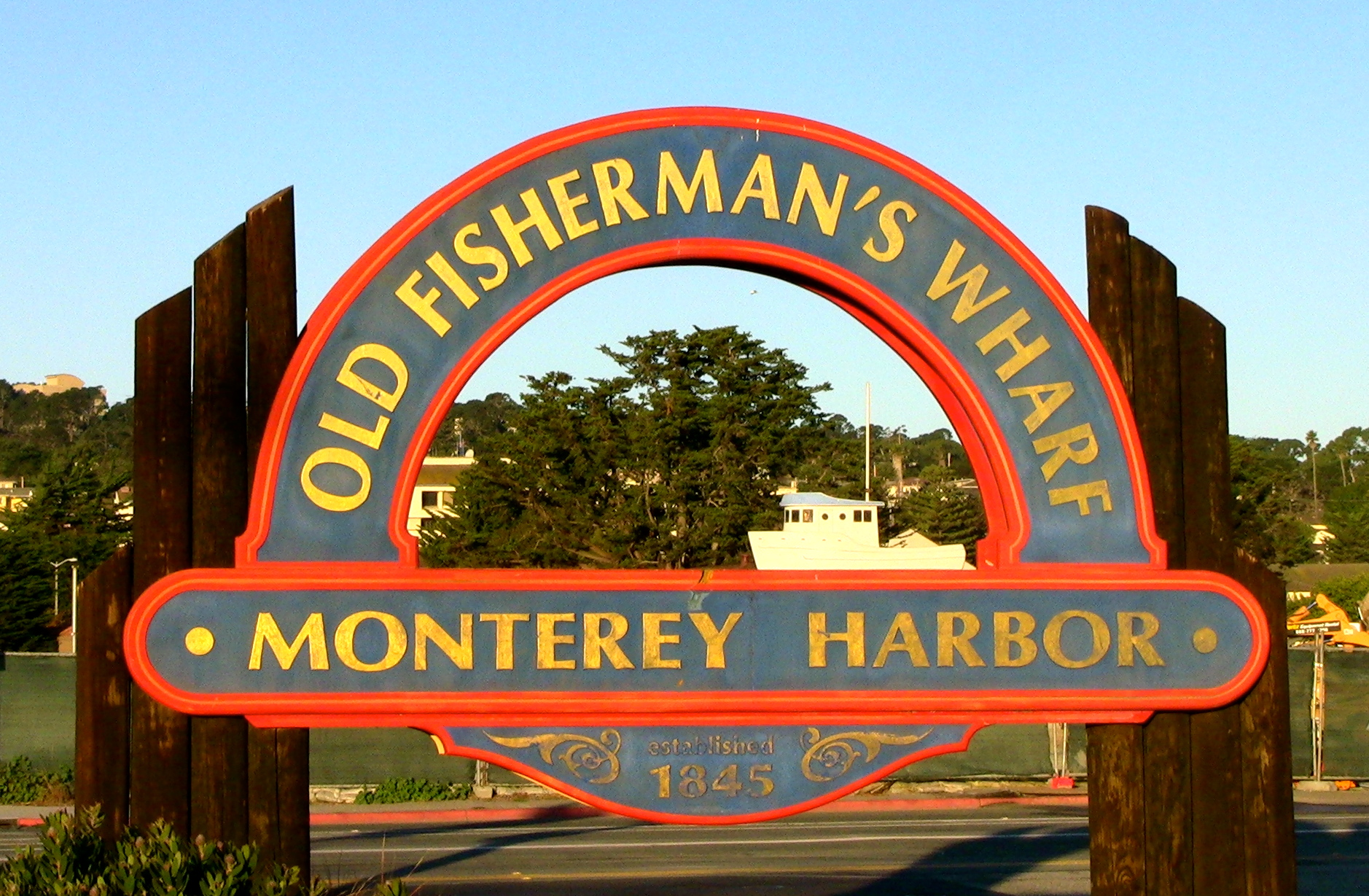
Sign in front of Old Fisherman's Wharf

Fisherman's Wharf is a historic wharf in Monterey, California, United States. Used as an active wholesale fish market into the 1960s, the wharf eventually became a tourist attraction as commercial fishing tapered off in the area.

Fisherman's Wharf is technically known as The Old Fisherman's Wharf, to distinguish it from the current commercial wharf (known as Municipal Wharf #2).

== History ==
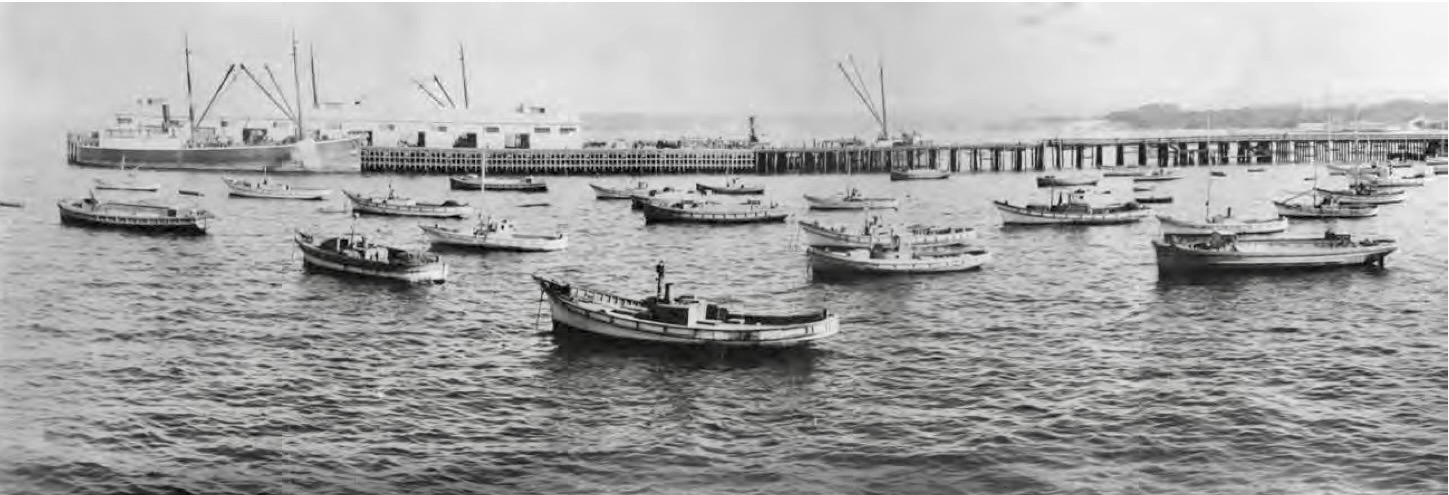
The New Fisherman's Wharf from the harbor, 1927, by A. C. Heidrick

The present Fisherman's Wharf was built by the Pacific Coast Steamship Company in 1870 for the loading and unloading of passengers and goods. The wharf was also used by other commercial operations, and the city of Monterey took ownership in 1913. The wharf was expanded through 1920.

In 1923, while an unusually large shipment of sardines was being loaded onto the S.S. San Antonio, bad weather caused the ship to lean on the wharf, and 132 feet of the wharf collapsed. When the wharf was reconstructed, it was extended by 750 feet.

Municipal Wharf II was constructed in 1926. After World War II, the sardine population in Monterey Bay collapsed. With the contraction of the fishing industry, Old Fisherman's Wharf reoriented its business focus toward tourism.

== Current use ==
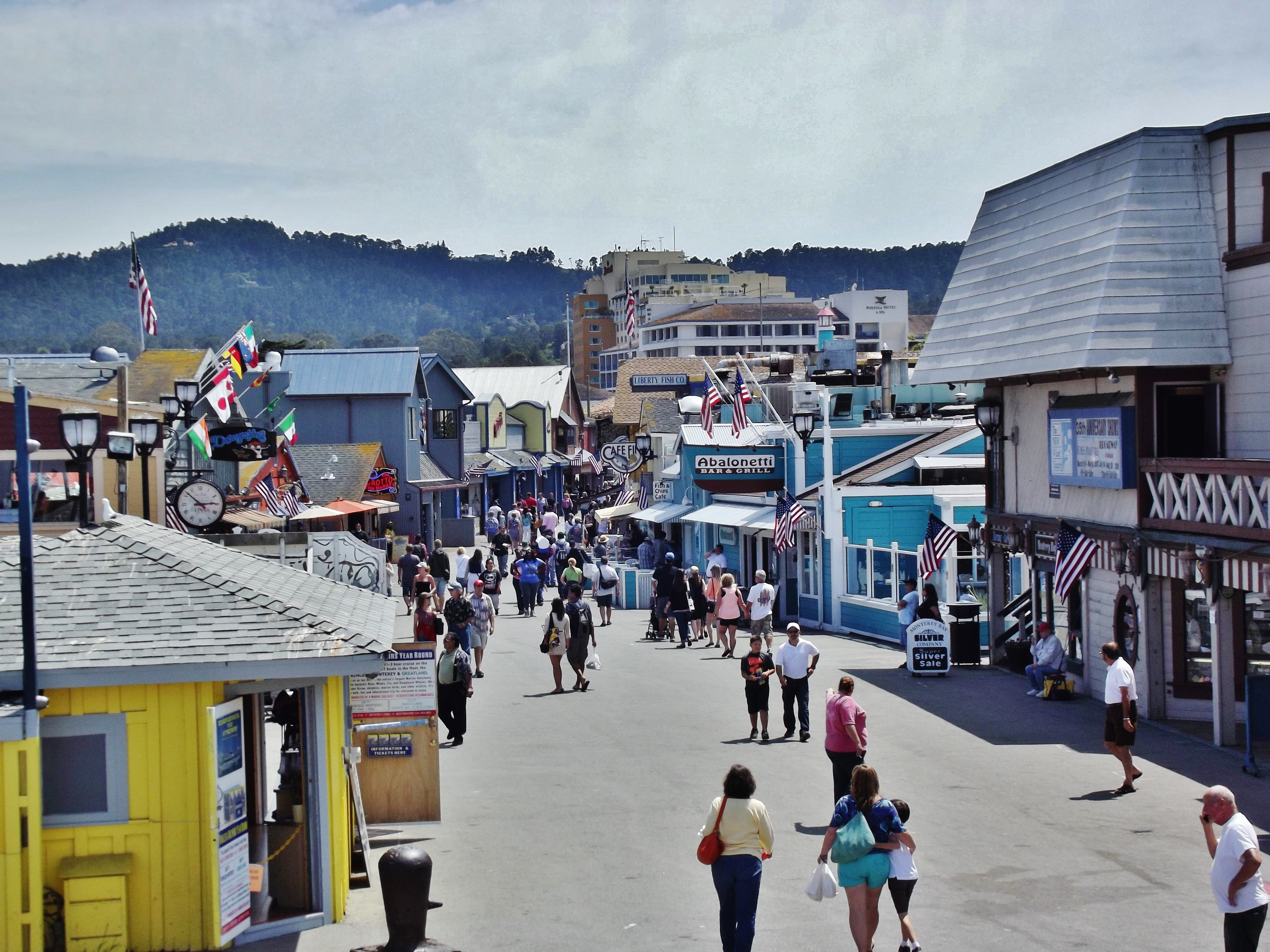
Restaurants, as well as live theatre line the walkway at Fisherman's Wharf in Monterey California

Fisherman's Wharf is lined with seafood restaurants ranging from casual, al fresco dining spots, to formal indoor dining, all with great views of the bay and Monterey Harbor. Along with Cannery Row, Fisherman's Wharf is one of the few areas in Monterey that sells souvenirs, so the restaurants are interspersed with gift shops, jewelry stores, art galleries, and three candy shops. Four Whale watching tours and fishing trips leave from the wharf, and sea lions often sleep on the pilings, buoys, and moored boats in the bay while sea otters and other marine life are easily viewed from the wharf.

At the entrance to the wharf is Custom House Plaza, the historical center of Monterey. Here you will find the Custom House, the first government building in California and the location where the United States took Monterey from Mexico in 1846. The Monterey Maritime Museum is also located in Custom House Plaza, detailing both the maritime and cultural history of Monterey and the surrounding area. Many other historic buildings are located in this plaza. It is also the location of the last whalebone sidewalk in the United States.

Accessible almost exclusively to pedestrians, Fisherman's Wharf is located at the end of the Alvarado Mall, just west of the municipal wharf. It is also on the Coastal Recreation Trail, providing pedestrian access to Cannery Row and Pacific Grove From Memorial Day to Labor Day the city of Monterey provides a free trolley service to Cannery Row and the Monterey Bay Aquarium. A favorite activity on the wharf, for both tourists and locals, is sailing on the Monterey Bay along Cannery Row.

In commemoration of its 180th anniversary in 2025, an online 450-photo collection, "Old Fisherman's Wharf Through the Decades" was posted for easy viewing on the History page of www.montereywharf.com. There will also be a 6-month photo exhibit, "On the Waterfront: The Chris Shake Collection" at the nearby Monterey History and Art at Stanton Center.

== See also ==
- Old Fisherman's Grotto
