= Butler Road =

Butler Road is the name of many roads in the English-speaking world, including Maryland Route 128.

== Other uses ==
- Butler Road station, a train station in California that closed in 1983
