= Bayshore Cutoff =

Railway line on the San Francisco Peninsula

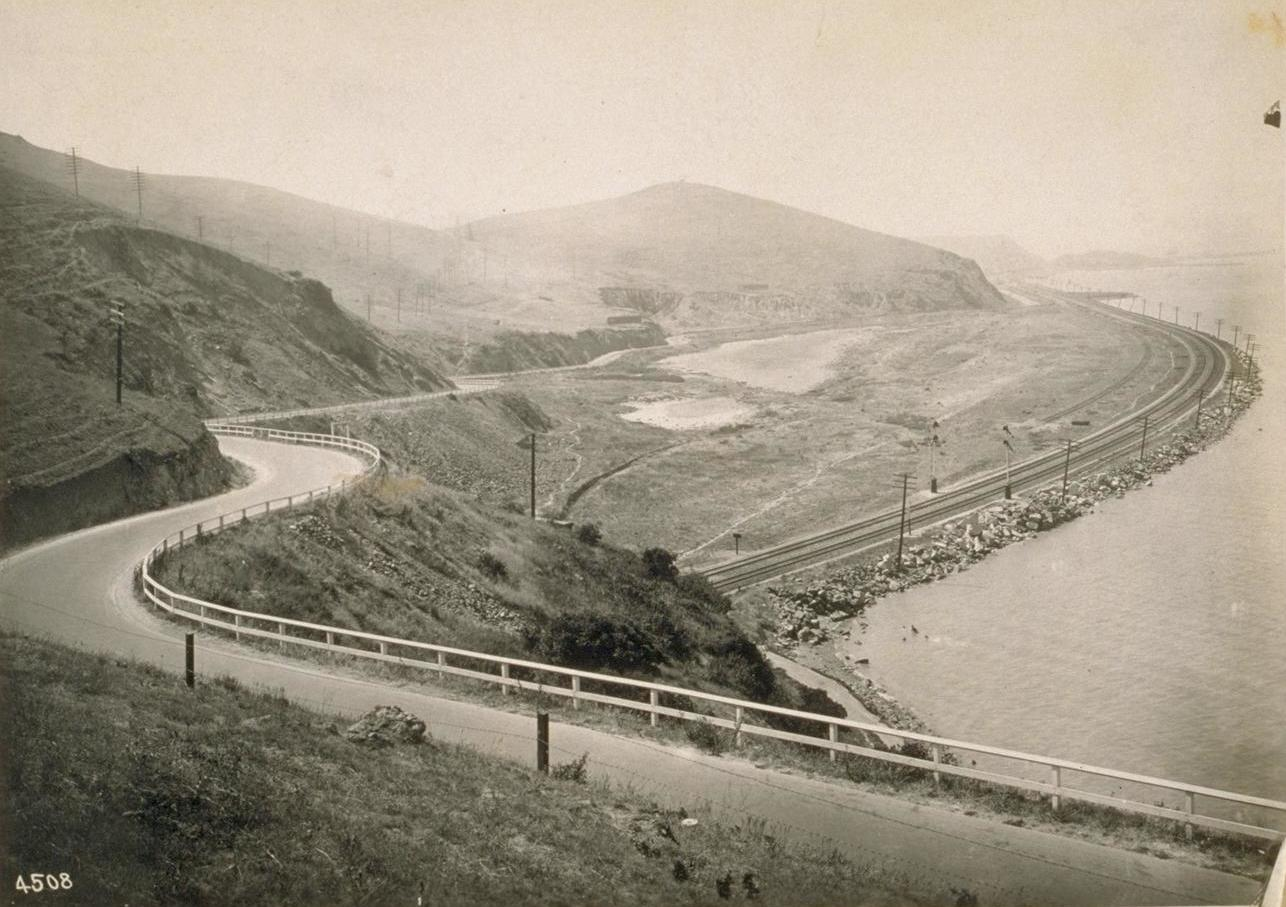
- Bayshore Highway crosses the Bayshore Cutoff at Tunnel 5, Sierra Point (c. 1915).

Overview
- Other name: Bay Shore Cut-Off
- Status: Revenue service
- Owner: Peninsula Corridor Joint Powers Board
- Locale: San Francisco and northern San Mateo counties
- Termini: San Francisco; San Bruno
- Stations: 7 (2 closed)

Service
- Type: Commuter rail, heavy rail
- System: SP (Coast Line, Peninsula Commute; 1863–1992); Caltrain and Union Pacific (1992–present)

History
- Work began: October 26, 1904
- Completed: December 8, 1907

Technical
- Line length: 11.04 mi (17.77 km)
- Num of tracks: 2 (4 in Brisbane after CTX)
- Track gauge: 4 ft 8 1/2 in (1,435 mm) standard gauge
- Electrification: Overhead line, 25 kV 60 Hz AC
- Operating speed: 79 mph (127 km/h)
- Highest elevation: 20.3 ft (6.2 m)

The Bayshore Cutoff (originally the Southern Pacific Bay Shore Cut-Off) is the rail line between San Francisco and San Bruno along the eastern shore (San Francisco Bay side) of the San Francisco Peninsula. It was completed by Southern Pacific (SP) in 1907 at a cost of $7 million (equivalent to $242 million adjusted for inflation), and included five tunnels, four of which are still used by Caltrain, the successor to Southern Pacific's Peninsula Commute service. Fill from the five tunnels was used to build the Visitacion or Bayshore Yard, the main SP classification yard near the city of Brisbane. The Del Monte was similarly rerouted over the line at some point in its operational history.

The original alignment of the Coast Line completed in 1863 took it around the western side of San Bruno Mountain, through Colma and Daly City. Rail traffic along the original route needed helper engines for grades and curves along a route nearly 13 miles (21 km) long. The Bayshore Cutoff reduced the distance to 10.5 miles (16.9 km) with a maximum grade of 0.3 percent.

Once the Bayshore Cutoff was completed, and main line traffic was shifted to it, the former route was renamed the Ocean View Branch line. It was used to carry coffins to Colma; it was severed in the 1940s, but a few miles at the south end was still in SP's 1996 timetable. In the late 1980s BART purchased the right-of-way of the Ocean View line for the San Francisco International Airport extension south from Daly City.

Bayshore Cutoff Tunnel 5, at Sierra Point, was abandoned when the easternmost tip of the point was leveled during construction of the Bayshore Freeway in 1955–56, and the line was rerouted through the leveled section as well. The rail yard was in operation until the 1970s, and the site is currently being considered for redevelopment for light industrial/retail use as part of the Brisbane Baylands development project.

== History ==
The 1907 Bayshore Cutoff (red) saved distance and grade compared to the original 1863 routing (blue), later renamed the Ocean View Branch.

The original route between San Francisco and San Bruno was laid by the San Francisco and San Jose Railroad (SF&SJ), one of the companies that later was absorbed into the Southern Pacific (SP). From the station in San Francisco at Mariposa and 18th, tracks were laid generally bearing west-southwest through the Mission District close to the present-day route of San Jose Avenue.

Southern Pacific took over the Peninsula Corridor in 1870 from the SF&SJ and began operating the Peninsula Commute between San Francisco and San Jose. Surveys were conducted for an alternate route east of San Bruno Mountain as early as 1878 and in 1894, it was revealed that SP had secretly purchased a more direct route along the shoreline of San Francisco Bay through an agent, Alfred E. Davis, who had previously been the manager to James G. Fair, the financier of the South Pacific Coast Railroad, a narrow-gauge railroad from Oakland to Santa Cruz. The Bay Shore line to South San Francisco opened from the south in May 1892, which would be integrated into the final alignment. By 1900, the Bayshore Cutoff route, including five tunnels, had been designed and plans were announced to start work "within a few weeks". The San Francisco Board of Supervisors attempted to compel SP to start using the Bayshore route by passing an ordinance in 1900 directing the Board of Public Works (BPW) to tear up the existing tracks. SP was granted an injunction to prevent that action, but BPW Commissioner Maguire planned to bring witnesses "to testify that the clanging of bells, shrieks of whistles, etc., interferes with the comfort and peace of the surrounding residents."

SP announced firm plans to build the Bayshore Cutoff and double-track the line in late 1901. President E. H. Harriman reiterated SP's plans to construct the Cutoff in mid-1902, predicting completion within the calendar year. Double-tracking from Burlingame south to San Jose was announced as well, and completed by 1903. In conjunction with the Dumbarton Cutoff, the Bayshore Cutoff was designed to facilitate transcontinental rail service into San Francisco. Instead of being a remote spur terminal, San Francisco would become "practically the same as a main line station" with the completion of the two new cutoffs, and transcontinental freight could then be loaded directly on trains without having to be ferried across the Bay.

The San Jose-based Evening News touted the benefits of the Cutoff, saying the fifteen minute savings in travel time combined with a more temperate climate would naturally lead to increased population in San Jose: "The warmer, drier and more even climatic conditions make [San Jose] far preferable for residence to a place where the men feel the need of an overcoat in the evening of the warmest days, and where the ladies scarcely know what it is to dress in light clothing and walk out in the evening." In 1903, the route of the Bayshore Cutoff was adjusted slightly; the original route called for tracks along Islais and Tulare streets, which due to their narrow width, would have closed those streets to any other traffic. Over a one-year period, Joseph B. Coryell acted as agent for SP to purchase properties bordering Islais Creek to allow the rerouting of the line.

The Bayshore Railway company was founded as a subsidiary of the Southern Pacific to build the Bayshore Cutoff. Construction started in 1904 and was completed in 1907 at a cost of $7 million (equivalent to $176 million in 2025), one of the most expensive rail lines constructed to date. In comparison, the Lucin Cutoff, which included a trestle across the northern end of the Great Salt Lake and saved 44 miles (71 km) of distance, cost $9 million. The Bayshore Cutoff, along with the Lucin and Montalvo Cutoffs, alleviated three key bottlenecks for Southern Pacific.

Rail traffic to San Francisco shifted over to the new Bayshore Cutoff immediately and has remained on that route ever since. Caltrain now runs daily commuter trains through four of the tunnels built for the Bayshore Cutoff. The fifth tunnel at Sierra Point was bypassed with the completion of the Bayshore Freeway about 1956.

The prior route west of San Bruno Mountain was renamed the Ocean View line and relegated to branch status. Although the Ocean View line was severed in 1942, the rails remained in place until the right-of-way was sold to the Bay Area Rapid Transit District and construction began on the SFO BART extension. Other potential routes proposed for the BART extension included an aerial structure along El Camino Real and a rail line parallel to I-280/380.

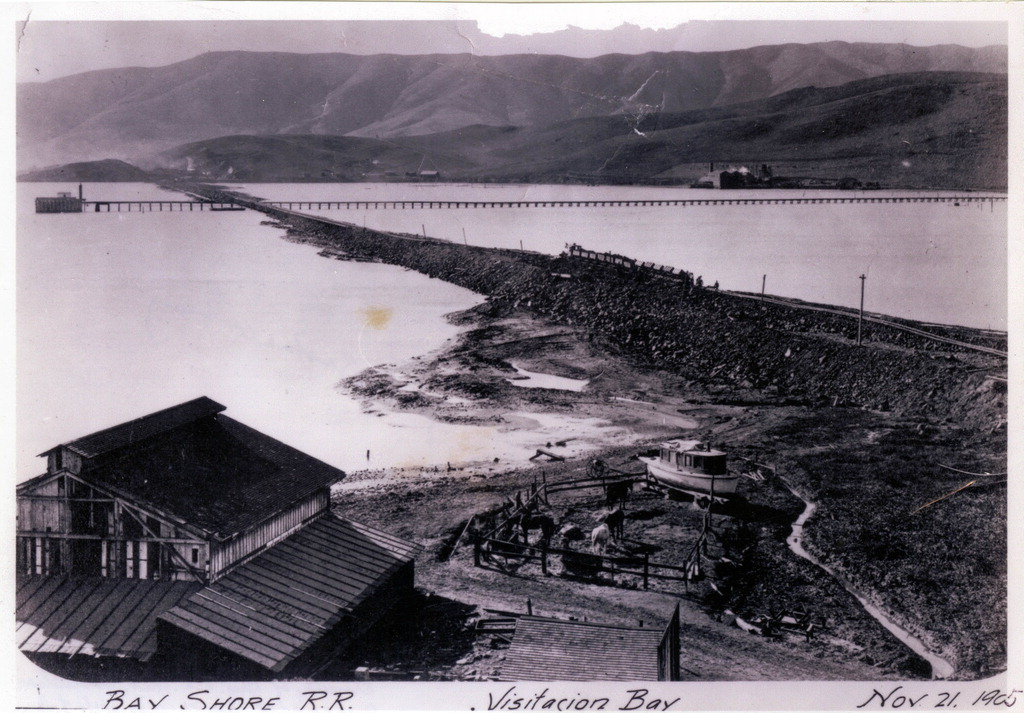
Visitacion Cove (Nov 1905), with trestle in place to receive fill

SP also completed a rail yard at Visitacion near the city of Brisbane. SP had previously purchased Visitacion Cove and partially filled it using earth excavated from the tunnels as well as mud dredged from the Bay. The yard was used to assemble trains and a large roundhouse and shops were used for steam locomotive maintenance. After diesel locomotives replaced steam by 1958 (the last steam locomotive in SP's system was a Peninsula Commute engine, which ran on January 22, 1957), the yard was used less frequently. SP consolidated freight operations at Oakland in 1964, and the Bayshore Yard began to be dismantled in 1979. The last day of work at the Bayshore shops was October 25, 1982; the land was sold to Universal Paragon in 1989.

== Design ==
The line included five tunnels, numbered north to south, and a former railyard near Brisbane, the Visitacion or Bayshore Yard. The historic Bayshore Roundhouse, previously used to service SP's steam locomotives, still exists at the yard. The first four tunnels are within the city limits of San Francisco.

The maximum grade of the completed Bayshore Cutoff is 15.8 feet per mile (2.99 m/km) (0.3% grade) compared to the 3% maximum grade of the older route. The maximum elevation of the Bayshore Cutoff is 20.3 feet (6.2 m), while the prior route rose to 292 feet (89 m) above sea level. The total distance between San Francisco and San Bruno along the Cutoff is 11.04 miles (17.77 km), saving 2.65 miles (4.26 km) over the original route west of San Bruno Mountain. The original 1900 design called for an aggregate length of the two tunnels under Potrero Hill and Sierra Point of 1,800 feet (550 m).

After completion, travel time from San Jose to San Francisco was cut from two hours to ninety minutes (for local trains) and seventy minutes (for limited-stop trains). The Evening News breathlessly advertised "the annihilation of seventeen minutes in a schedule" in an article covering the opening of the Cutoff.

Although the Bayshore Cutoff is double-tracked, the right-of-way outside the tunnels is sized to accommodate quad tracks. Quad tracks were added in Brisbane as part of the Caltrain Express project from 2004 to 2006.

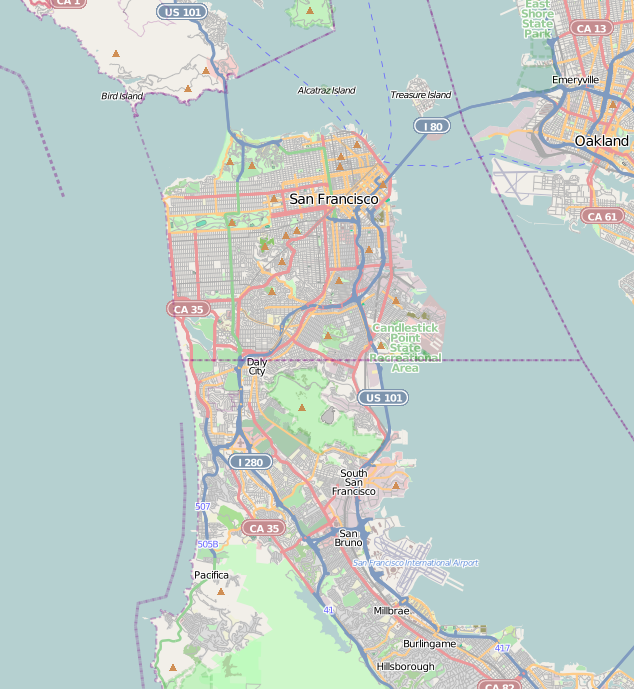
Bayshore Cutoff Tunnels & Yard

=== Construction ===
Initial bids on construction costs ranged between $2 and $2.5 million (between $71.7 million and $89.6 million in 2025 adjusted for inflation). Preliminary work began in April 1904, and actual construction started on October 26 of that year. An earthquake in late November 1904 was at first mistaken for blasting being done for the Cutoff. Work on the first tunnel (which was later designated Tunnel No. 5) at Sierra Point began on April 18, 1905, and at the time it was predicted that revenue service would begin on December 31, 1906. A week and a half later, a steam shovel had excavated 150 feet (46 m) (starting from the south portal) and work had begun on the second tunnel (later designated Tunnel No. 4), which had reached a length of 200 feet (61 m). After the Lucin Cutoff was completed, workers on that job moved to the Bayshore project, and orders were placed for forty iron arches, each spanning 30 ft (9.1 m), to be used in tunnel construction.

By May 1905, good progress was being made, as workers excavating the tunnel had found "nothing harder than sand and earth", but they were forced to wear rubber clothes due to the damp conditions. Two shifts of work were started in June, and the stone blocks to be used in the portals had arrived at Tunnel 5. By July, work on the final tunnel (later designated Tunnel No. 3) had started, and SP General Manager E.E. Calvin confidently predicted all tunnels would be completed in 1906. Heavy rain during February 1906 damaged the roadbed between South San Francisco and San Bruno when the final stages of construction were about to commence.

Work was being performed in two shifts when the 1906 San Francisco earthquake struck in April. Workers in Tunnel 3 (below the orphanage) were terrified by the shaking, which extinguished the lamps they were using, but no one was injured and the tunnel was not damaged. After the earthquake, construction continued. Earthquake survivors were unnerved by blasting for the tunnels, which they thought were aftershocks. Some of the areas for the Bayshore Cutoff route south of China Basin were filled with rubble from the earthquake, allowing more rapid progress than planned. SP officials announced in August 1906 the estimated completion date for the Bayshore Cutoff would be January 24, 1907. Once the Cutoff was in place, they stated that more frequent service would be offered for commuters, with headways of 30 minutes and total travel time to San Jose estimated at one hour.

By July 1907, four bridges still needed to be completed for the Cutoff, touted to be "one of the fastest pieces of railroad in the United States" once it was completed. The steel girders were delayed in transit and the completion date of the Cutoff was delayed from October to November 1907. A final carload of steel was rushed from Ogden to complete the Fifth Avenue crossing, and the first planned passenger trains to use the Cutoff would be for fans from San Francisco traveling to Stanford to watch a football game. The new line officially opened on December 8, 1907.

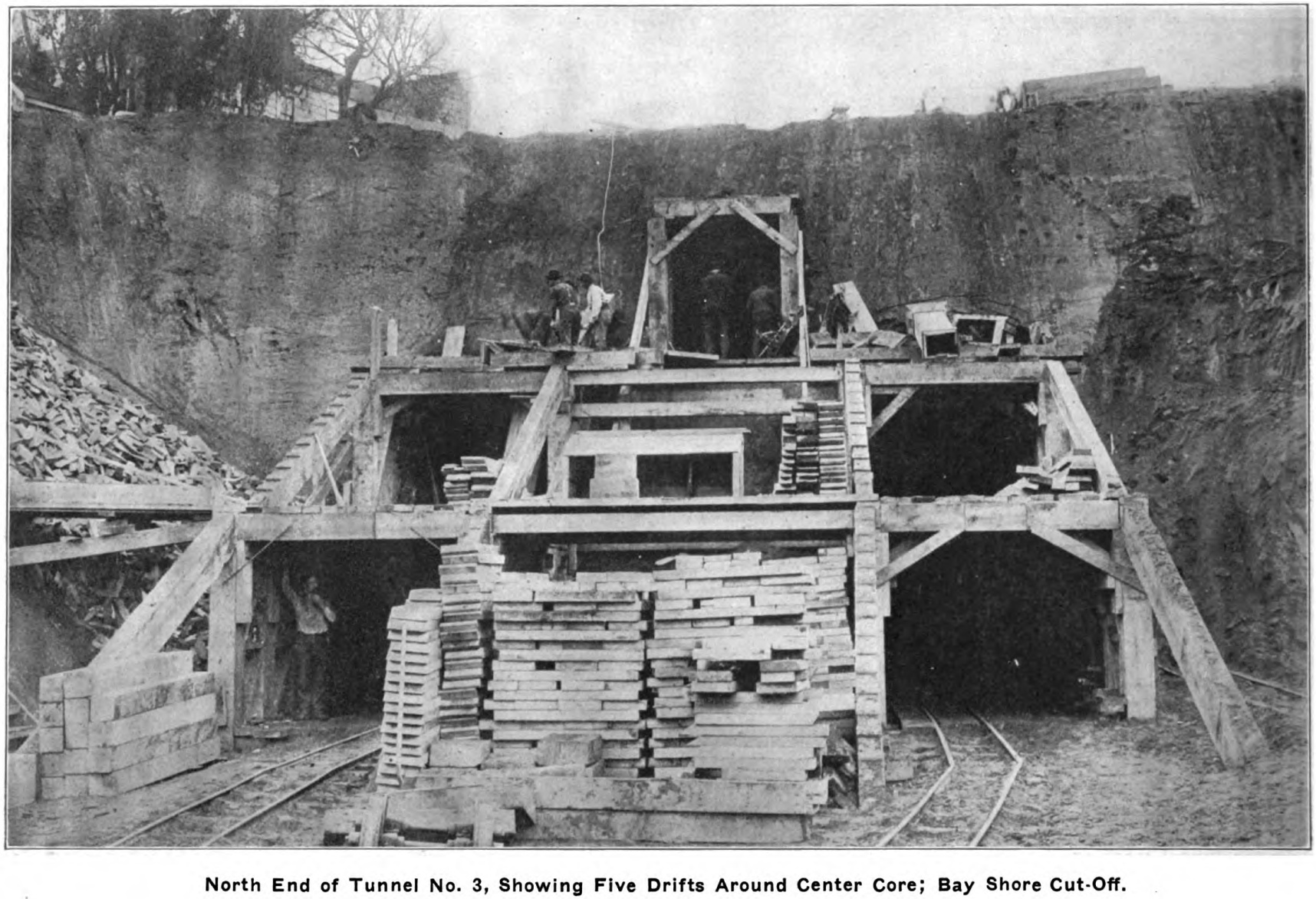
Five-drift tunnel construction (Tunnel No. 3)

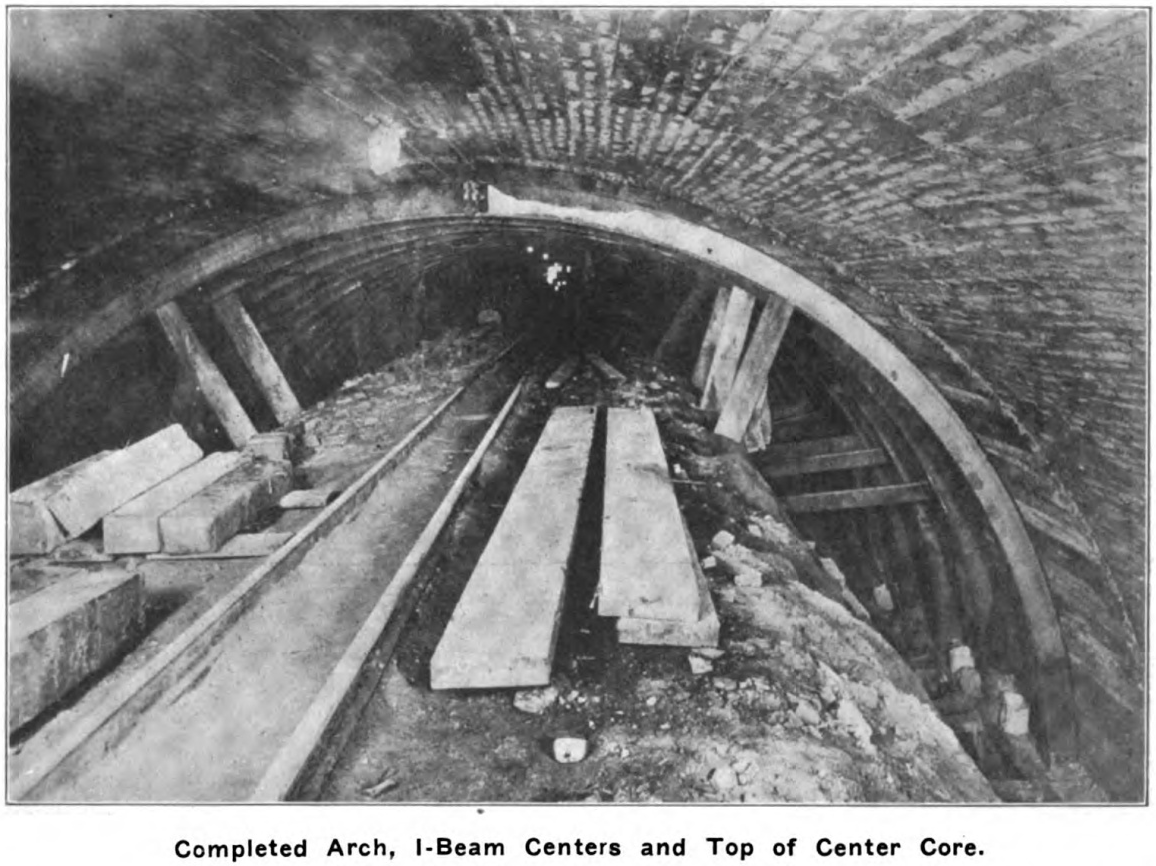
Brick arch in tunnel

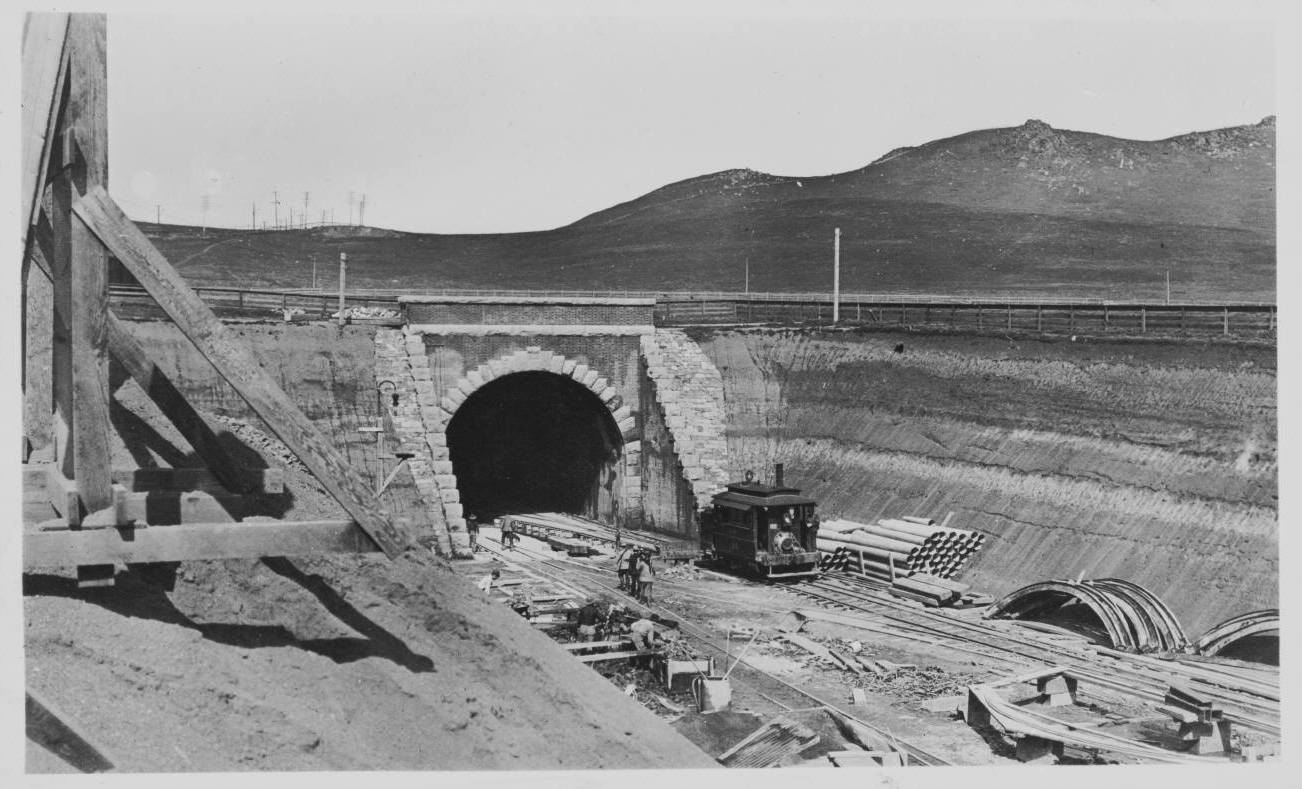
Nearly complete tunnel, with steel arch forms

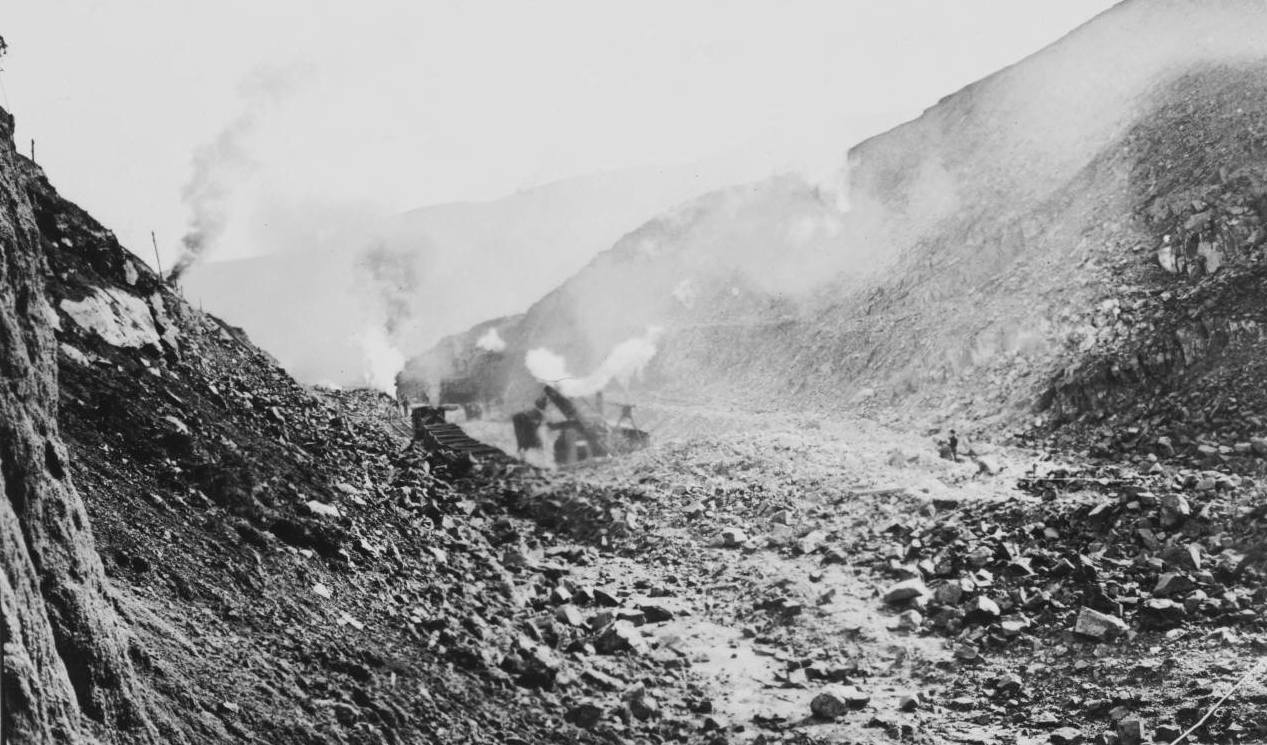
Steam shovel working in cut (1906)

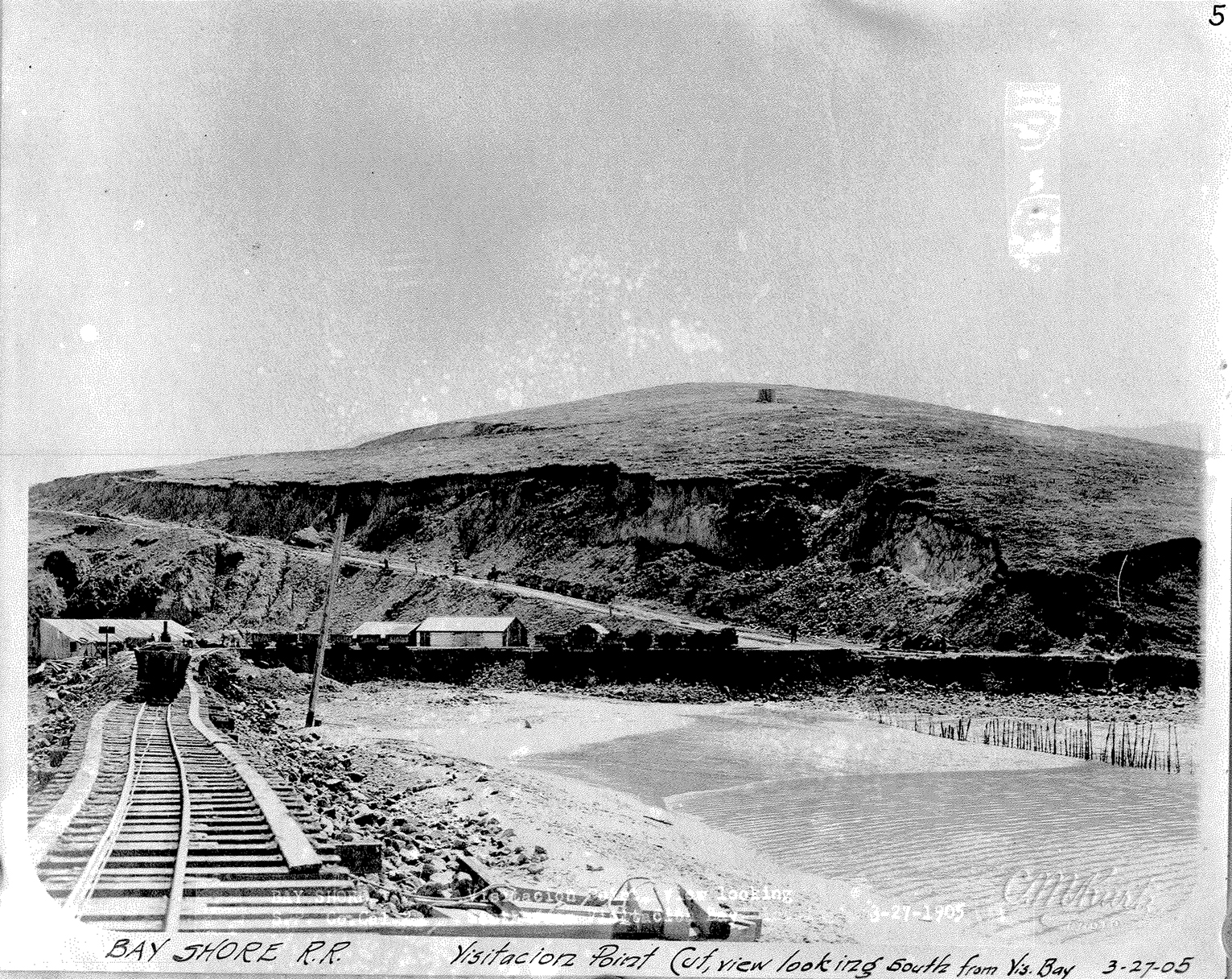
Cut at Visitacion Point (1905)

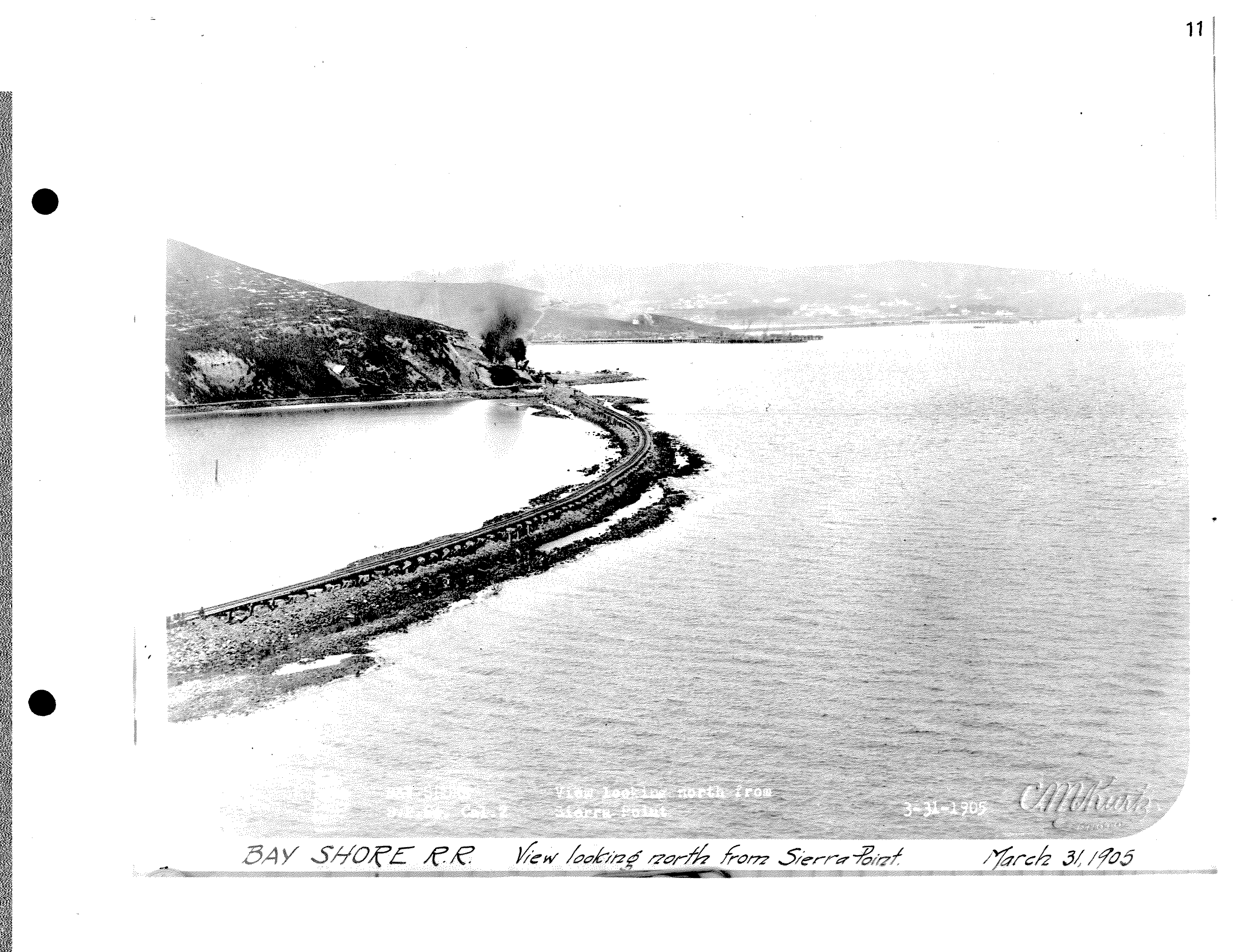
North from Sierra Point, prior to fill (1905)

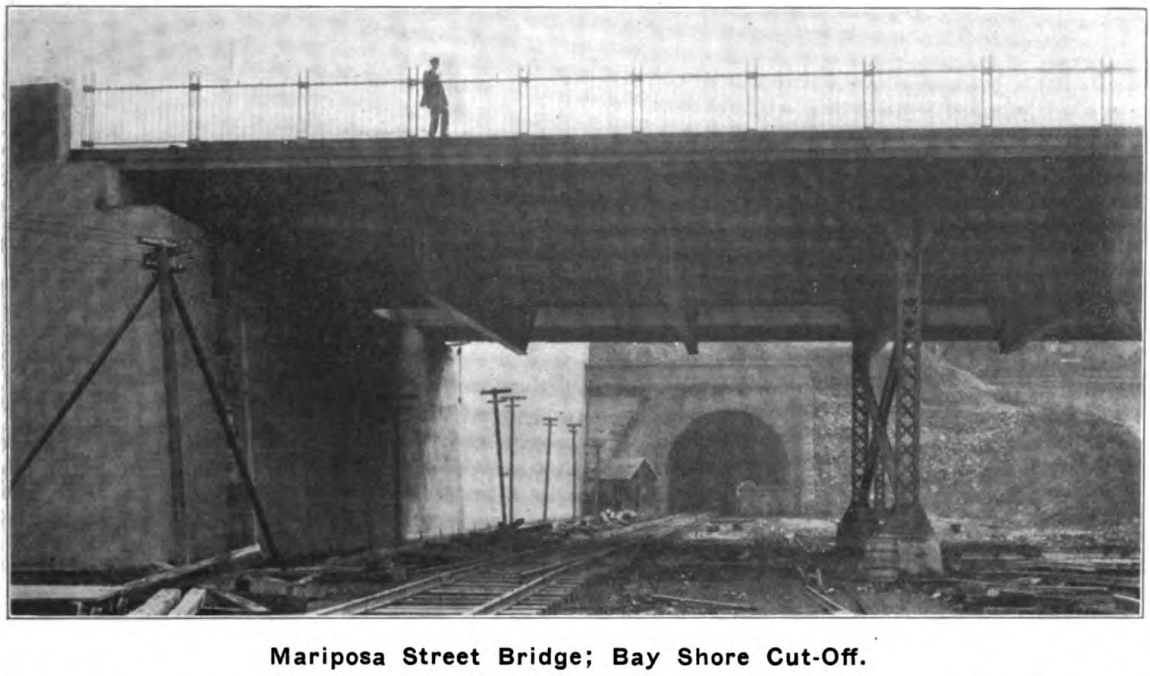
Bridge at Mariposa Street (1907)

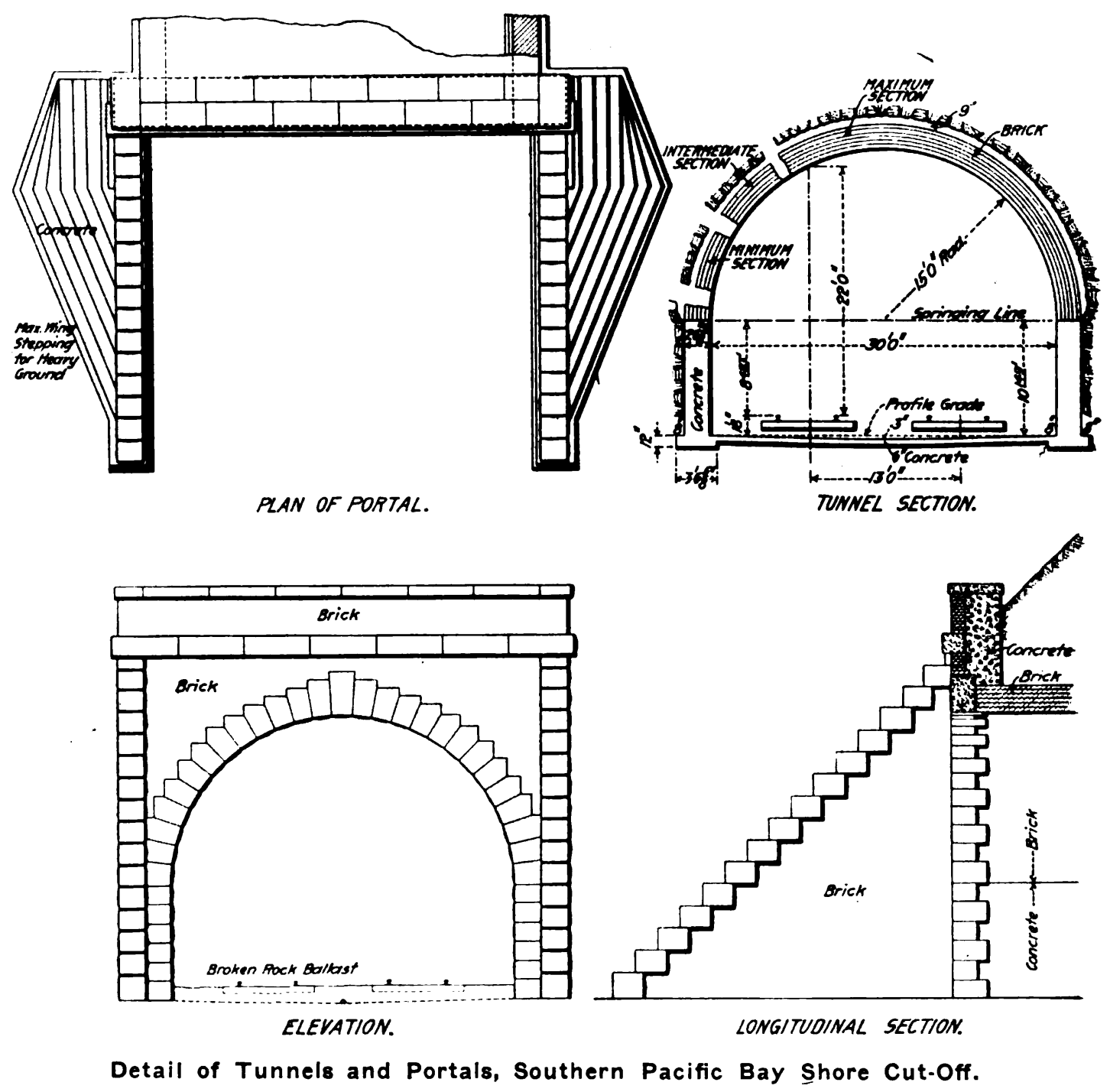
Tunnel and portal details (1904)

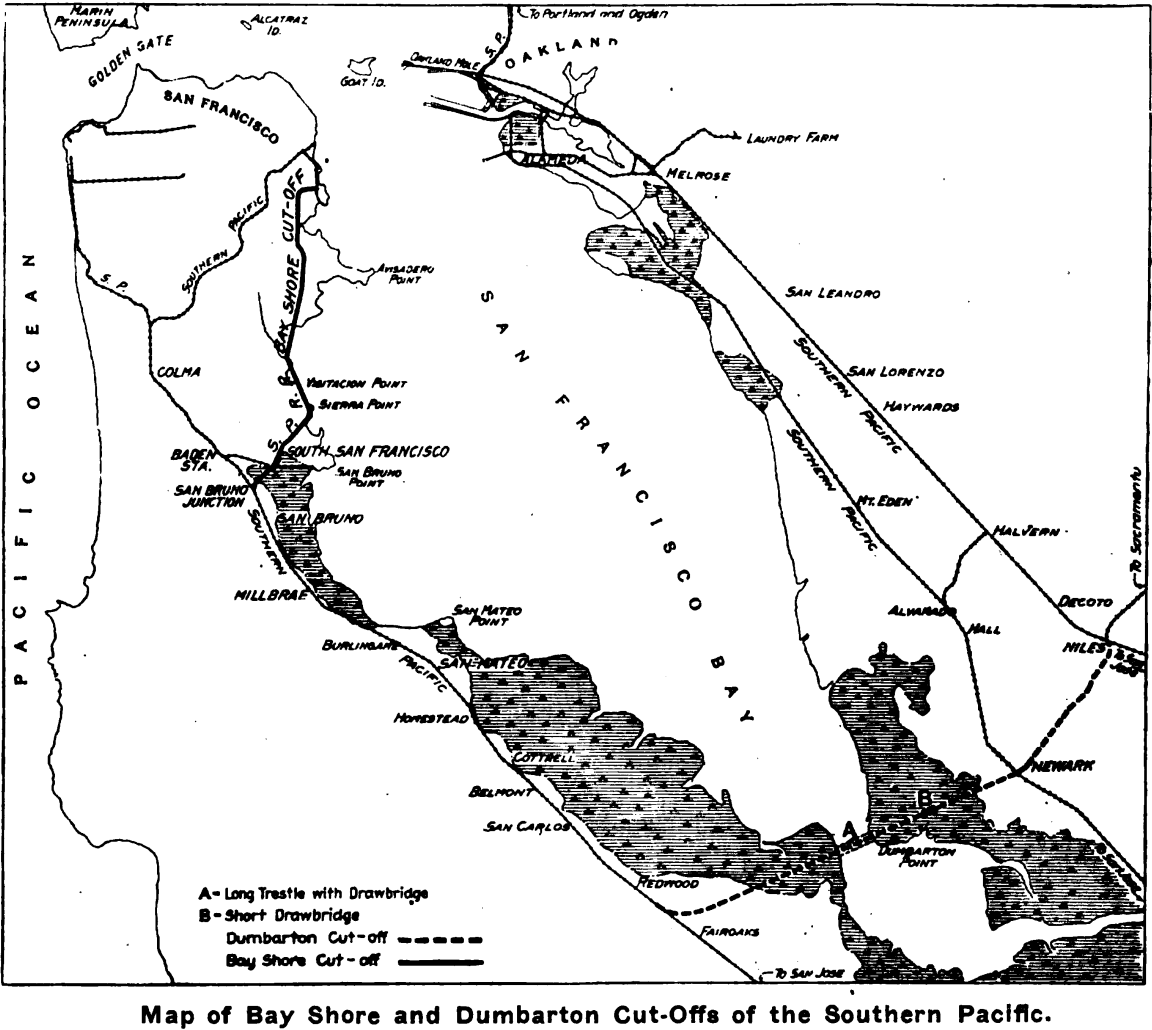
Map of Bayshore and Dumbarton Cut-Offs

=== Tunnels ===
Average progress on the tunnels was 8 feet per day (2.4 m/d). The aggregate length of the five tunnels is 9,947 feet (3,032 m) as completed (10,180 feet (3,100 m) as designed), which is one-fifth of the entire 9.81-mile (15.79 km) length of the Bayshore Cutoff. Each tunnel shares the same cross-section design, being a semicircular arch 30 feet (9.1 m) wide to accommodate two tracks spaced 13 feet (4.0 m) apart (centerline to centerline). Overall height in the center of the tunnel is 27 feet (8.2 m), with clearance of 22 feet (6.7 m) above the top of the rail at each track centerline. The tracks are elevated 1 foot 8 inches (0.51 m) above the tunnel floor by ballast and ties.

Tunnel 2 was built using cut-and-cover, but the other four were built by first sinking pilot drifts approximately 8 by 7 feet (2.4 by 2.1 m) in cross-section at the bottom corners of the tunnel. After these first two drifts were completed, the concrete side walls were partially built and timber supports were placed to allow the excavation of two more drifts on top of the first drifts up to the springing line where the semicircular brick arch meets the concrete side walls. With the side drift excavation complete, the concrete side walls are poured. A fifth drift was then bored at the apex of the tunnel, followed by excavation of the remaining space between the apex and side drifts. Once these initial excavations were complete, leaving a "core" of rock in the center of the tunnel, timber bracing was placed to support the rock at the top of the tunnel and a steel arch form was installed. After covering the arch form with planks, five to six layers of brick were laid to form the semicircular arch, resting on concrete side walls. The space between the top of the arch and the excavated tunnel was backfilled with loose rock, or concrete if the pressure was especially large. The temporary timber supports and arch form were removed, and the remainder of the tunnel was cleared by blasting, with the blasted rock being sorted for incorporation in the concrete.

Bayshore Cutoff Tunnel summary
No.	Length	Crosses	North portal	South Portal	Image
1	1,817.3 ft 553.9 m	Potrero Hill	Mariposa St, between Pennsylvania & Indiana; 37.763992°N 122.392858°W	22nd St (Pennsylvania & Iowa); 37.757733°N 122.392337°W	South portal (2010)
2	1,086.4 ft 331.1 m	Potrero Hill	23rd St (Pennsylvania & Indiana); 37.754767°N 122.392490°W	25th St (Connecticut & Pennsylvania); 37.751800°N 122.392921°W	North portal (2017)
3	2,364 ft 721 m	Hunters Point	Palou Ave (Dunshee & Phelps); 37.736763°N 122.395005°W	Williams Ave (Diana & Reddy); 37.730238°N 122.395885°W	South portal (c. 1907)
4	3,547 ft 1,081 m	Candlestick Point	Salinas Ave (Gould & Carr); 37.721194°N 122.397869°W	Blanken Ave (Bayshore & Tunnel); 37.711814°N 122.401226°W	South portal (2012)
5	1,133.8 ft 345.6 m	Sierra Point	between Van Waters & Rogers Rd and Bayshore Blvd; 37.675999°N 122.390933°W	between Bayshore Blvd & US 101 (now filled); 37.672867°N 122.391118°W	North portal (1908)

Tunnels 1 and 2 bracket the present-day 22nd Street station. Tunnel 1 is just north of the station, and Tunnel 2 is south. Both tunnels are cut through Potrero Hill. Tunnel 2 is the only one of the five tunnels built with twin bores to accommodate four tracks, although the western bore is currently closed. The western bore was built because a high concrete retaining wall was needed to support a city street running alongside that second tunnel. Tunnel Top Park, at 1100 Pennsylvania Avenue, is within the Caltrain-owned right-of-way. These two tunnels were bored through mostly serpentinite rock with clay seams.

The Western Pacific Railroad (WP) also built a tunnel through Potrero Hill at nearly the same time; support timbers within the Western Pacific tunnel caught fire in 1962, leading to its collapse and subsequent fill. The area on top of the WP tunnel remained undeveloped until the 1990s.

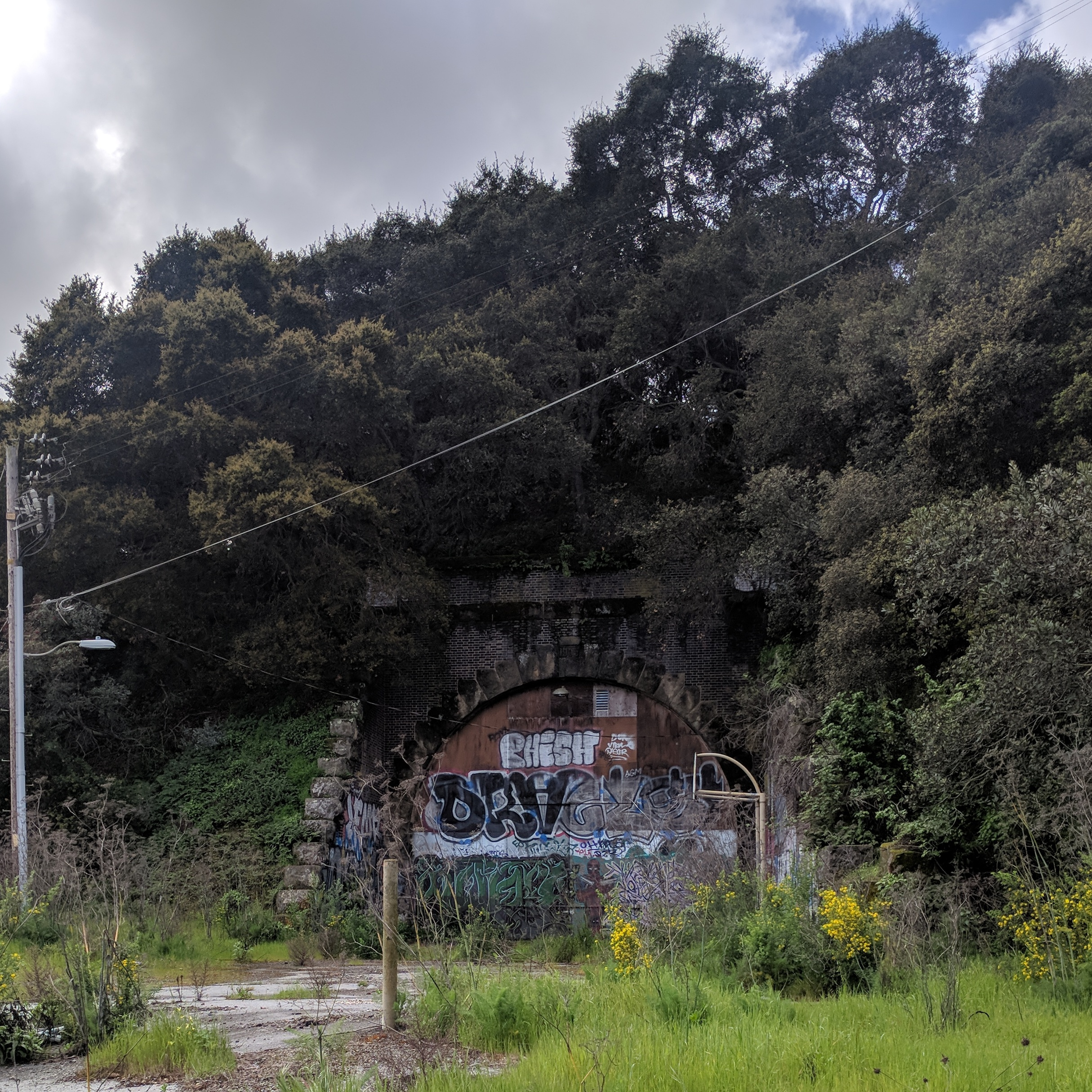
North portal of Tunnel 5 (2018)

Tunnel 3 traverses the Hunters Point neighborhood. It was built under the St. Joseph's orphan asylum. The tracks are 175 feet (53 m) below the ground's surface. Tunnel 3 is bored through wet sand and hard silicated formations.

Tunnel 4 crosses Candlestick Point. The former Schlage factory and headquarters, constructed in 1926, are located just west of the southern portal of Tunnel 4. In 1907, it was noted that Tunnel 4 had been bored through very wet ground and partly through shale. The earthquake of April 1906 caused a spring to start leaking into Tunnel 4, which went unnoticed until several months after the seismic event, when the reinforced concrete of the completed tunnel began to bulge, eventually causing water to leak into the tunnel. The spring was not capped until 1911.

Tunnel 5 crosses Sierra Point and was bored through hard sandstone. Tunnel 5 was abandoned in 1956 when the old Bayshore Highway (which is now the present-day Bayshore Boulevard in Brisbane and South San Francisco) was expanded into the six-lane divided Bayshore Freeway. The route for the freeway was moved to the east along a new causeway constructed on fill between Candlestick Point and Sierra Point, which also pushed the rail line east, eliminating the need for the tunnel. Some of the fill was taken by razing Sierra Point to the level of the railroad. The southern portal would have emerged between Bayshore Boulevard and the Bayshore Freeway, but it has since been filled in. The northern portal still exists, but access is restricted by a padlocked fence next to a parking lot just off Bayshore Boulevard.

=== Bayshore Yard ===
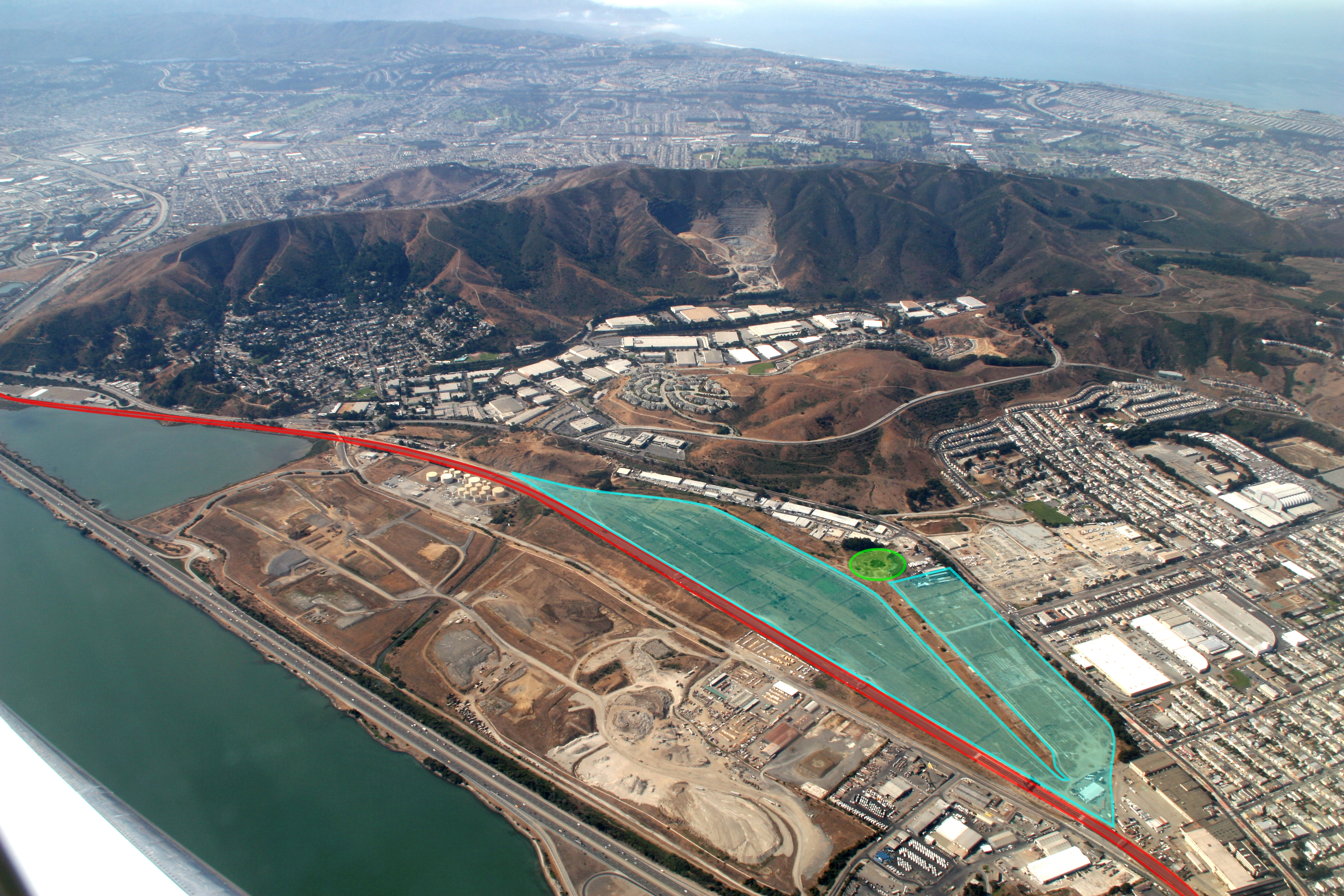
Aerial view of area (facing approximately southwest) surrounding the former Bayshore Yard (2006)
- Cutoff
- Railyard
- Roundhouse

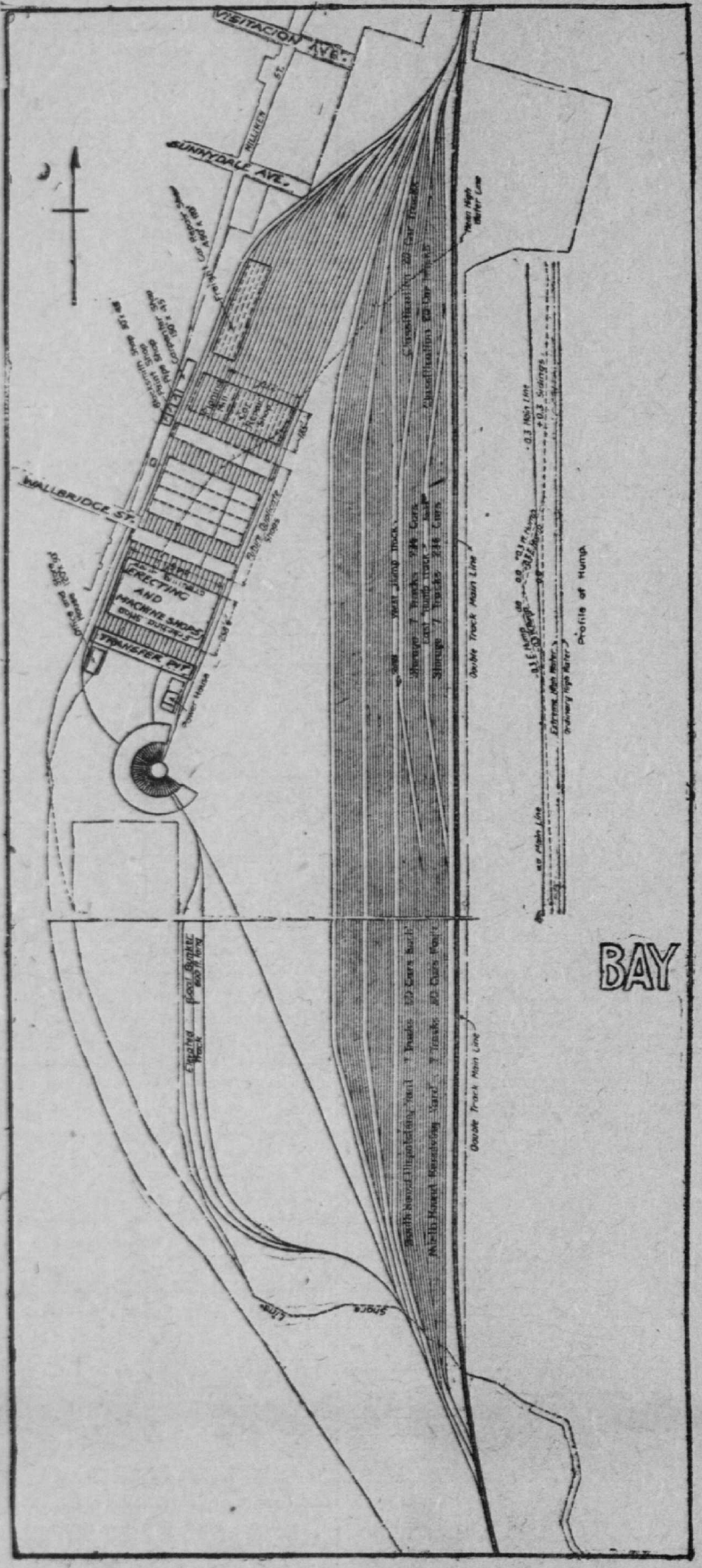
Schematic plan of Bayshore Yard (from 1907)

Other prominent landmarks include San Bruno Mountain (rising in the background), the city of Brisbane in its northeastern edge (left), and a quarry on the north edge. The Cow Palace is at the center right side of the photo, and U.S. 101 cuts diagonally from the center left to the bottom center. When originally completed in 1907, the Bayshore Cutoff rail line was on the western shore of San Francisco Bay; the area east of the line was subsequently filled as the municipal landfill for the City and County of San Francisco until the 1950s.

Fill taken from tunnel excavation and cuts was used to build a new railyard at Visitacion. One of the cuts, at Visitacion Point, was 95 feet (29 m) deep and removed 750,000 cubic yards (570,000 m^{3}) of material. SP purchased Visitacon Cove and constructed 2.5 miles (4.0 km) of trestles to dump fill into San Francisco Bay, reclaiming 156 acres (63 ha) of land in total. In total, more than 3,000,000 cubic yards (2,300,000 m^{3}) of fill were used to reclaim land for the railyard, including 1,895,000 cubic yards (1,449,000 m^{3}) of mud dredged from San Francisco Bay. Because the Bayshore Yard was built on reclaimed land, building foundations were built on piles set, on average, 55 feet (17 m) deep, and the fill under the rails required constant replenishment for ten years until it was sufficiently compacted.

The Bayshore Yard contained approximately 50–65 miles (80–105 km) of track, in an approximately triangular area bounded by the Bayshore Cutoff main line (on the east), the Bayshore Highway (on the west, now Bayshore Boulevard), Tunnel 4 (on the north), and the deep cut at Visitacion Point (on the south). It extended 8,400 feet (2,600 m) in length, measured north to south, and 1,800 feet (550 m) wide east to west at the apex of the triangle. An additional 18.2 miles (29.3 km) of track were authorized in January 1917 along with the main shop buildings. By 1921, the Bayshore Yard was substantially complete.

The design of the Bayshore Yard had thirty-eight tracks in the main freight space; seven tracks on both the north and south ends each had a capacity of fifty cars. The north end of the yard also had fourteen storage tracks (total capacity of 472 cars) and eighteen classification tracks. In all, the total capacity of the railyard was 1,068 cars on 24 inbound tracks, and 1,078 cars on 19 outbound tracks. 7 of the outbound tracks had a maximum capacity of 74 cars each. Most of the tracks were spaced at 13 feet (4.0 m) between centerlines. SP consolidated its freight and maintenance operations at the Bayshore Yard; maintenance had previously been performed at two locations: 16th and Harrison, and Mariposa. The yard hump was the second hump constructed on the West Coast (after the classification yard at Roseville).

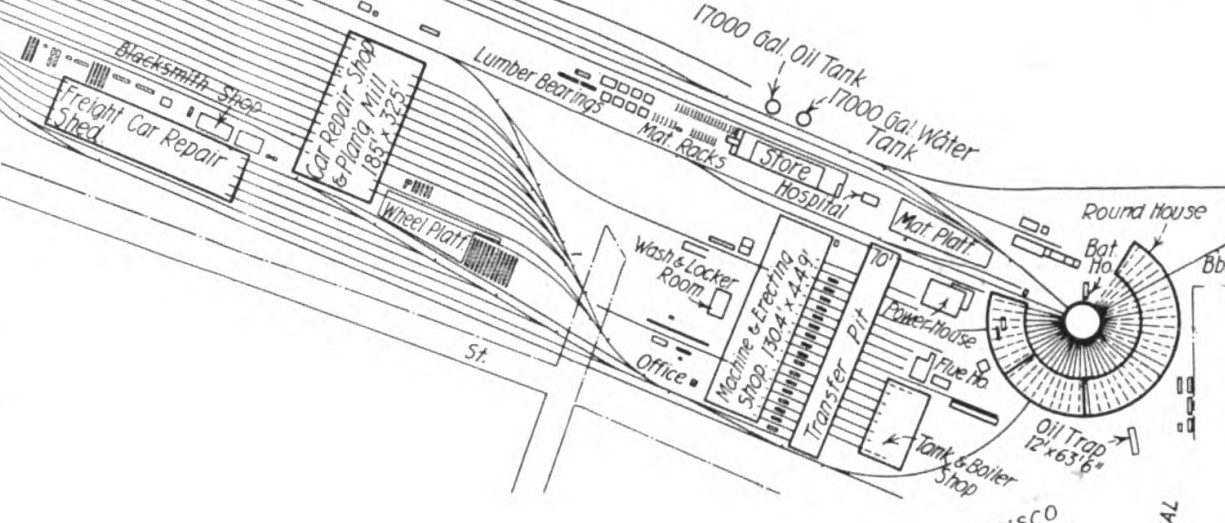
Plan of Bayshore Yard, Roundhouse and Shops area (1921). North is to the left. Note the completed plans for the roundhouse would have enclosed all forty stalls; as built, the roundhouse only enclosed stalls 24–40, numbered sequentially in a clockwise direction.

Steam locomotive maintenance would start in the Roundhouse. Once the locomotive left the Roundhouse, it would move to the Transfer Pit (northwest of the Roundhouse), then be moved sideways on a 78-foot (24 m) long transfer table riding on six rails to line up with a track into the Erecting and Machine Shops, where a gantry crane would pick up the boiler and put it on a railcar to move it 300 feet (91 m) south to the Tank and Boiler Shop for refurbishment. At the height of operations between 1911 and 1958, more than 3,000 were employed at the railyard and shops. The railyard was handling 42,000 cars per month in 1921, and had 1,196 employees earning a monthly average of US$164.31 (equivalent to $3,000 in 2025). As SP's most heavily traveled segment, the railyard handled 22 million gross tons per mile of freight in the 1920s and 46.5 million gross tons per mile during World War II.

The Bayshore Yard site was acquired by Tuntex (now Universal Paragon) in 1989. Universal Paragon has proposed redeveloping the area as the Brisbane Baylands development. As of 2013, the only buildings left from the railyard are the Roundhouse (built c.1910, abandoned), the Tank and Boiler Shop (built c.1920, leased to Lazzari Fuel in 1963 and used as a charcoal warehouse), and the Visitacion Ice Manufacturing Plant (built 1924 for Pacific Fruit Express, currently leased to Machinery and Equipment, Inc.).

=== Bayshore Roundhouse ===
- Southern Pacific Railroad Bayshore Roundhouse
- U.S. National Register of Historic Places
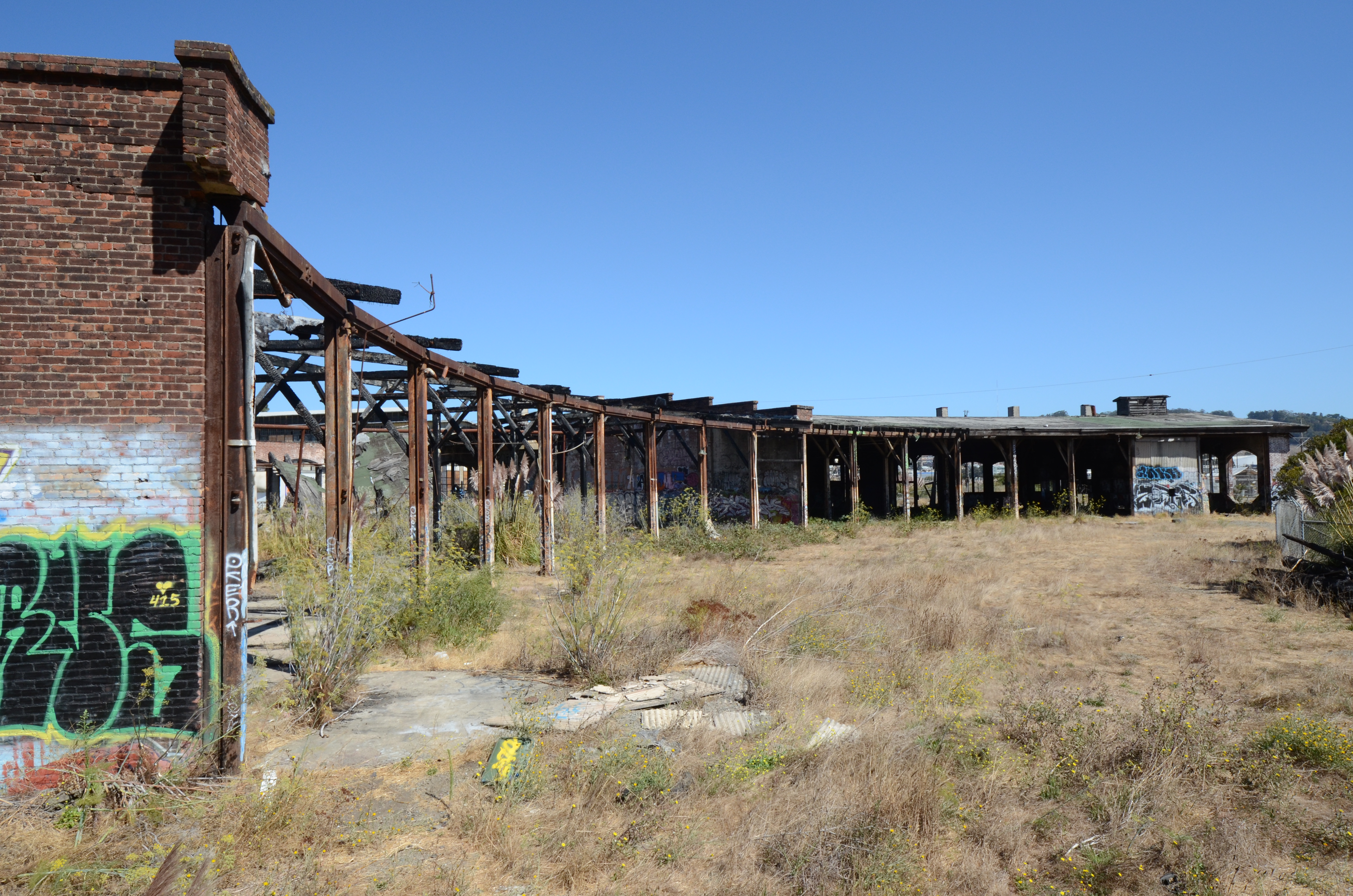
- Roundhouse in 2012
- Location: Jct. of Industrial Way and Bayshore Ave., Brisbane, California
- Coordinates: 37°42′03″N 122°24′31″W
- Area: less than one acre
- Built: 1910
- Built by: Southern Pacific Railroad
- Architectural style: Industrial
- NRHP reference No.: 10000113
- Added to NRHP: March 26, 2010

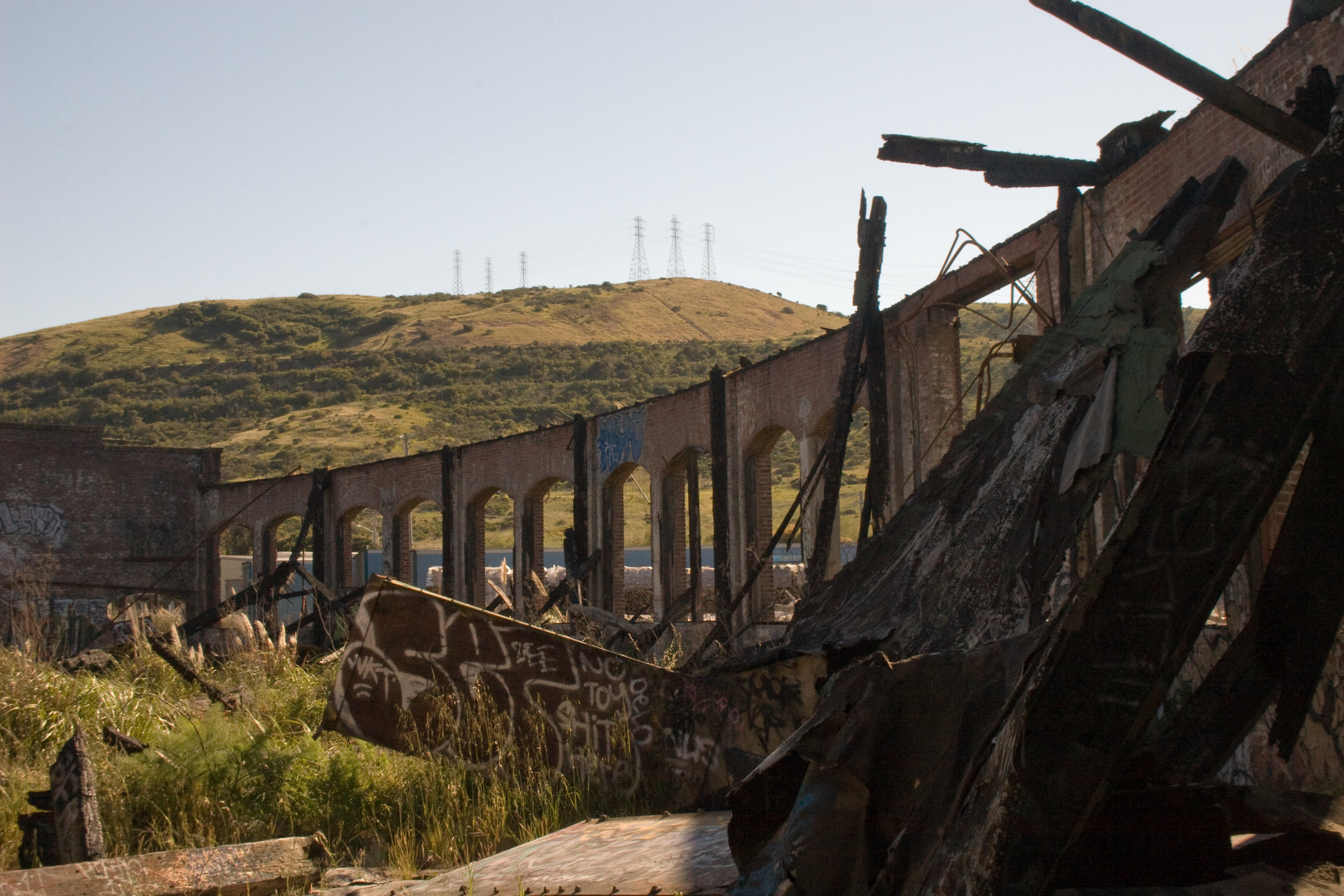
Roundhouse in 2009

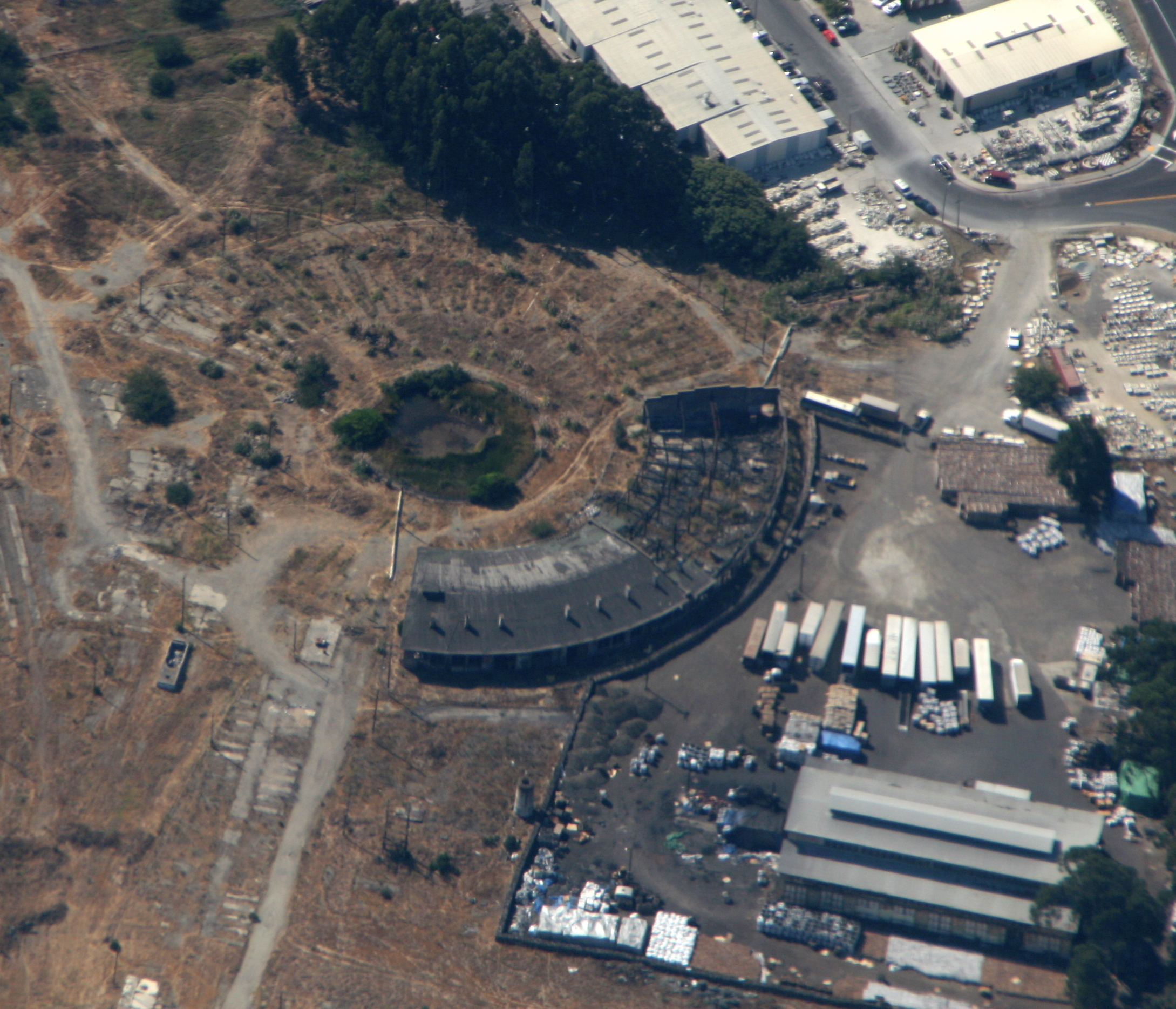
Aerial view, facing south, of Bayshore Roundhouse (note burned roof over stalls #24–32) and Tank and Boiler Shop (at lower right), in 2006

The Southern Pacific Railroad Bayshore Roundhouse, at the junction of Industrial Way and Bayshore Ave. in Brisbane, California, was listed on the National Register of Historic Places in 2010.

The Bayshore Roundhouse was completed in 1910 and still stands, although it was damaged in an October 2001 fire which destroyed approximately half the roof. Construction on the Roundhouse started in 1908, shortly after the Bayshore Cutoff was completed, and it was one of the first buildings at the new Bayshore railyard.

The Roundhouse encompasses an arc of 108 degrees, and has an inner radius of 125 feet (38 m) and an outer radius of 212 feet (65 m). It has forty stalls, and an on-site powerhouse, north of the Roundhouse, provided steam for locomotive use, burning coal from a bunker 600 feet (180 m) long. Seventeen of the stalls (numbered #24 to #40, clockwise) were inside the building and covered. Stalls #1 to #23 were outside whisker tracks, although construction plans, contemporary articles, and the presence of foundation pilings suggest the roundhouse was originally designed to enclose these as well. The wall adjacent to stall #40, on the eastern side of the building, contains four sets of windows, and the outer circumference of the building has two sets of windows for each stall. There is one fire wall (between stalls #32 and #33) without windows (which stopped the 2001 fire from destroying the roof of stalls 33–40), and the wall adjacent to stall #24 does not have windows, since it was originally intended to serve as a second interior fire wall.

As originally constructed, the turntable was pneumatically operated with a diameter of 80 feet (24 m). The turntable was enlarged to 110 feet (34 m) in 1941 using steel salvaged from the Pajaro River bridge; with the enlargement, the Roundhouse was capable of handling SP's largest steam locomotives. The fire in 2001 destroyed the roof covering stalls #24 through #32. Today, it is the last standing brick roundhouse in California, and it was added to the National Register of Historic Places in 2010.

=== Other structures ===
The Erecting and Machine Shops (or Backshops) building had a footprint of 130.4 by 449 feet (39.7 m × 136.9 m), and had 15 engine pits, each 55 feet (17 m) in length, with a 120-short-ton (110 t) gantry crane in the erecting portion, and a smaller 15-short-ton (14 t) crane in the machine shops portion. One scene for the film Harold and Maude was filmed at the Bayshore Yard; the Backshops building was used as the studio of Glaucus, the artist who is carving a nude of Maude in ice. That building was demolished in the mid-1980s.

The Tank and Boiler Shops ceased operation with the end of steam locomotives in the 1950s, and was leased to the Lazzari Fuel Company in 1963, who use it today to store charcoal.

Other shops in 1921 included the Locomotive Paint Shop; the Planing Mill and Car Repair building, another large shop with a footprint of 185 by 335.5 feet (56.4 m × 102.3 m); and the Freight Car Repair Shed, 117 by 441 feet (36 m × 134 m).

The Visitacion Ice Manufacturing Plant, at the southern end of the Bayshore Yard, was completed in 1924. It was capable of freezing 90 short tons (82 t) of ice per day, and could store 2,300 short tons (2,100 t). It made ice between 1924 and 1955 for Pacific Fruit Express refrigerated cars. The building was sold to the Market Street Van & Storage Company in 1962.

=== Historic station stops ===
From north to south:

Key:	Open	Closed

Municipality	Station	mi (km)	Services	Opened	Closed	Notes
San Francisco
San Francisco	Third and Townsend Depot	0	SP services (formerly)	August 17, 1874	1975	Connected with the Ocean View Branch
San Francisco	4th and King		Caltrain; Muni Metro: N Judah, T Third Street; Muni; FlixBus	1975		
San Francisco	22nd Street	1.9 (3)	Caltrain; Muni			between Tunnel 1 and Tunnel 2
San Francisco	Army Street	2.2 (4)	SP services (formerly)			between Tunnel 2 and Tunnel 3
San Francisco	Newcomb Avenue	3.1 (5)	SP services (formerly)			between Tunnel 2 and Tunnel 3
San Francisco	Paul Avenue	4.1 (7)	Caltrain (formerly)		August 1, 2005	between Tunnel 3 and Tunnel 4
San Francisco	Bayshore	5.2 (8)	Caltrain; Muni, SamTrans, Bayshore/Brisbane Senior Shuttle, Commute.org			between Tunnel 4 and Tunnel 5
	Visitacion	6.5 (10)	SP services (formerly)			
South San Francisco
South San Francisco	Butler Road	8.6 (14)	Caltrain (formerly)		July 1983	
South San Francisco	South San Francisco	9.3 (15)	Caltrain; SamTrans, Commute.org	May 1892		Opened prior to completion of the Bayshore Cutoff, but integrated into the route
San Bruno	San Bruno	11.6 (19)	Caltrain; SamTrans	October 18, 1863		Connected with the Ocean View Branch
continues south as the Coast Line
