= Brisbane Baylands development =

Undeveloped parcel of land in California, US

Brisbane Baylands
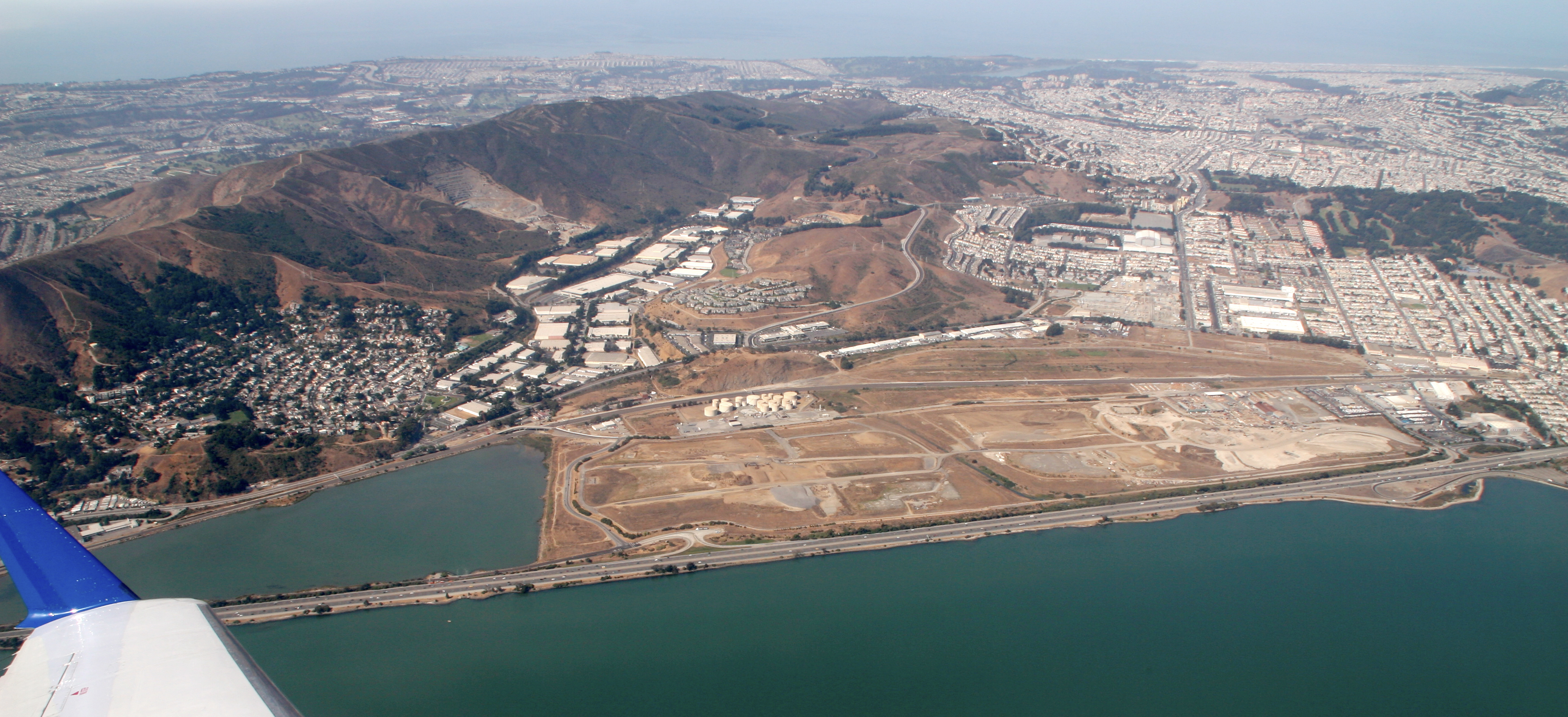
- This picture, facing west, shows the city of Brisbane at the south end (left side), which is sheltered by the prominent San Bruno Mountain rising in the background. The proposed Brisbane Baylands includes the land between Bayshore Boulevard and U.S. 101 (closer to the camera) north of the triangular Brisbane Lagoon.

Project
- Website: thebaylands.com

Location
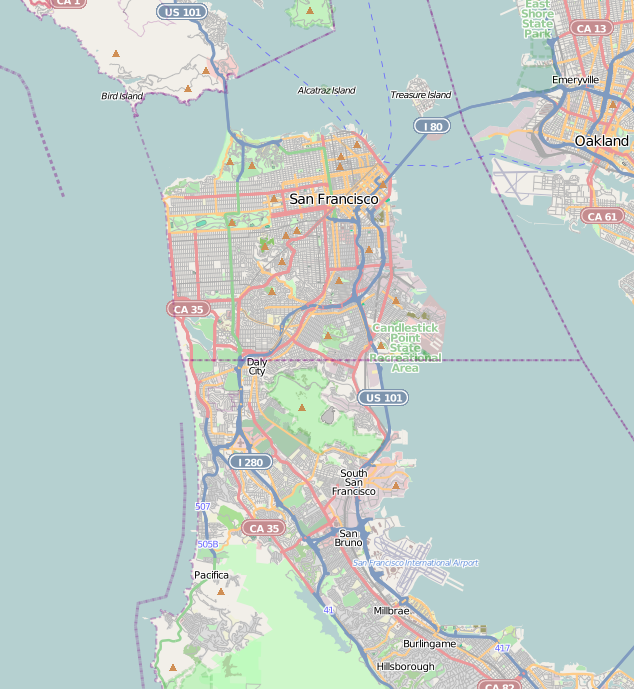
- Location within San Francisco
- Coordinates: 37.707°N 122.404°W
- Country: United States
- State: California
- City: Brisbane

The Brisbane Baylands is a 660-acre (270 ha) parcel of land in Brisbane, California, United States, just south of the San Francisco border. There have been several proposals to develop the site, which was previously used as a railyard and a municipal landfill; historical uses have led to contaminated soil and polluted stormwater runoff. None of the present proposals have been approved by Brisbane's city council.

The approximately triangular site is oriented primarily north–south and is bounded by Bayshore Boulevard to the west, the Bayshore Freeway to the east, and the San Francisco–San Mateo County line to the north; it includes Brisbane Lagoon as the southernmost extent, although no development is planned for the lagoon. The primary road through the site is Tunnel Avenue, running north–south. Commuter rail service is provided by Caltrain at Bayshore station located at the center of the site, the Muni Metro T Third line provides light rail service to San Francisco along the west border of the site at Arleta station and Sunnydale station.

== Historical uses ==
The San Francisco Bay shoreline was just east of Bayshore Highway (which is now Bayshore Boulevard); debris from the 1906 San Francisco earthquake and fill taken from the construction of the Bayshore Cutoff, which opened in 1907, were used to fill a portion of the Bay west of the railroad tracks and east of Bayshore Highway, creating a classification yard for Southern Pacific.

San Francisco's municipal landfill was in operation from 1932 to 1967, filling in the portion of Brisbane Lagoon east of the tracks and west of U.S. 101. U.S. 101 runs along the current shoreline.

== Concept plans ==
The Brisbane Baylands site is owned by Universal Paragon Corporation (UPC). The site is being planned for significant regional transportation improvements as analyzed in the Bi-County Transportation Study, including a multi-modal transit station at the Bayshore station, connecting Caltrain, an extended Muni Metro T Third Street train, the planned Geneva-Harney bus rapid transit, and multiple bus routes operated by Muni and SamTrans. Geneva Avenue, which currently dead-ends onto Bayshore Boulevard, would be extended across the width of the Baylands and connected to Harney Way.

The earliest plan, later designated the Developer-Sponsored Plan (DSP), was submitted by UPC in 2005 and updated significantly in 2011. Contemporaneously, the City of Brisbane began developing an alternative in 2009 with input from residents, designated the Community Proposed Plan (CPP). The group called the Committee for Renewable Energy in the Baylands (CREBL) advanced another alternative in 2006, designated the Renewable Energy Alternative (REA).

All plans call for environmental remediation of the brownfield land to clean up chemicals left in the soil from its use as a railyard and municipal dump.

Summary of Concept Plans
		Developer-Sponsored Plan	Developer-Sponsored Plan, Entertainment Variant	Community Proposed Plan	Community Proposed Plan, Recology Expansion Variant	Renewable Energy Alternative
		(DSP)	(DSP-V)	(CPP)	(CPP-V)	(REA)
Area (Note: Area within city limits of Brisbane only)	Overall	684 acres (277 ha)				
Area	Overall	excludes 44.2-acre (17.9 ha) Recology site (Note: Recology site extends partly into San Francisco)		includes 44.2-acre (17.9 ha) Recology site (Note: Under CPP-V, Recology site would expand to 65.5 acres (26.5 ha))		
Area	Renewable energy generation (Note: Includes area specifically set aside for renewable energy generation; does not include rooftop solar.)	25 acres (10 ha)		unspecified		141 acres (57 ha)
New residences		4,434		none		
New residences		5,150,400 ft^{2} (478,490 m^{2}) total		—		
New developments	Total area (Note: Includes new structures, residences, and streets/infrastructure)	12,238,800 ft^{2} (1,137,020 m^{2})	12,191,900 ft^{2} (1,132,660 m^{2})	8,145,100 ft^{2} (756,700 m^{2})	8,215,100 ft^{2} (763,210 m^{2})	1,982,200 ft^{2} (184,150 m^{2})
New developments	Hotels & Conference	261,100 ft^{2} (24,260 m^{2}) (369 rooms)	586,800 ft^{2} (54,520 m^{2}) (719 rooms)	1,392,300 ft^{2} (129,350 m^{2}) (1990 rooms)	1,056,100 ft^{2} (98,110 m^{2}) (1500 rooms)	—
New developments	Mixed (Note: Retail, mixed commercial, office, and research and development uses)	566,300 ft^{2} (52,610 m^{2})	283,400 ft^{2} (26,330 m^{2})	2,209,500 ft^{2} (205,270 m^{2})		173,800 ft^{2} (16,150 m^{2})
New developments	R&D only	3,328,300 ft^{2} (309,210 m^{2})	2,599,200 ft^{2} (241,470 m^{2})	2,007,000 ft^{2} (186,500 m^{2})	1,672,200 ft^{2} (155,350 m^{2})	654,900 ft^{2} (60,840 m^{2})
New developments	Office (Note: Includes institutional uses)	2,762,000 ft^{2} (256,600 m^{2}) (Note: Includes 110,800 ft^{2} (10,290 m^{2}) school)	2,363,100 ft^{2} (219,540 m^{2})	992,700 ft^{2} (92,220 m^{2})		—
New developments	Entertainment (Note: Includes civic and cultural uses)	28,200 ft^{2} (2,620 m^{2})	1,066,500 ft^{2} (99,080 m^{2}) (Note: Compared to DSP, would include entertainment options including all of: 17,000-20,000 seat sports arena; 5,500 seat concert theater; multi-screen cinema; conference/ exhibition space; additional hotel rooms; instead of retail & office spaces in northeast portion)	1,074,500 ft^{2} (99,820 m^{2})		(Note: Not specified)
New developments	Industrial	142,500 ft^{2} (13,240 m^{2})		469,100 ft^{2} (43,580 m^{2})	1,220,100 ft^{2} (113,350 m^{2})	1,153,500 ft^{2} (107,160 m^{2})
Open space		169.7 acres (68.7 ha)		330 acres (130 ha)		
Lagoon area		135.6 acres (54.9 ha)				
Annual estimates	Revenue	$16,720,000	$18,090,000	$17,550,000	$15,970,000	not analyzed
Annual estimates	Expenditures	$14,550,000	$14,580,000	$7,840,000	$7,600,000	not analyzed

Notes

Brisbane Baylands key locations
1 Kinder Morgan tank farm (not included in development)
2 Bayshore Roundhouse
3 Recology San Francisco Transfer Station
4 Bayshore
5 Sunnydale
6 Arleta

=== Developer-Sponsored Plan (DSP) ===
UPC's land use proposal, one of several introduced to Brisbane's city council, calls for the development of an entertainment district that could include an arena, concert theater and cineplex, 12,500,000 square feet (1,160,000 m^{2}) of R&D, 1.5 million of office, 64,000 feet (20,000 m) of civic space, 287,000 square feet (26,700 m^{2}) of retail, 4,434 housing units, a high school, transit/roadway improvements, 25-acre solar farm and nearly 200 acres of open space. Housing would be limited to the land previously used as the railyard.

=== Community Proposed Plan (CPP) ===
The Brisbane Planning Commission submitted an alternative plan in 2009 to the City Council. The primary difference in land use was the lack of any new housing units.

== Project timeline ==
=== Draft plans ===
UPC originally submitted a draft plan to the City in 2005. The Schlage Lock factory site just north of the old railyard, within the city limits of San Francisco, was transferred to UPC in 2008 as part of a settlement with the previous owner, Ingersoll-Rand. At the time, the historic Schlage office building was planned to be converted into a community center, and 1,250 housing units would be added to the combined parcel.

In 2010, UPC revised the plan and submitted an updated Baylands Specific Plan and Appendix.

In Feb 2011, UPC submitted the draft Brisbane Baylands Specific Plan and associated Infrastructure Master Plan. The project is projected to create 15,000 – 20,000 permanent jobs and would be built over a 30-year schedule.

=== Environmental Impact Reports ===
The Baylands is the subject of an environmental impact report (EIR) prepared for and released by the City of Brisbane on June 11, 2013. The DEIR analyzes four concept plans: the Developer-Sponsored Plan (DSP), DSP with an entertainment variant (DSP-V), the Community Proposed Plan (CPP), and a CPP with a Recology expansion (CPP-V). One of the major findings of the EIR is that "Brisbane currently is a 'jobs rich' city [with] more than four times as many jobs as employed residents [...] the ratio between jobs and employed residents in Brisbane is not balanced [and] such an imbalance between jobs and housing typically contributes to higher homes prices due to demand outstripping supply, increased traffic congestion in the area, increase air and noise pollution, and longer commute times for workers". The EIR found that by providing housing adjacent to the proposed office and transit improvements, car trips and the associated greenhouse gases would be significantly reduced under the DSP concepts; since the CPP concepts only provided new jobs without housing, greenhouse gas emissions would rise.

In addition to the two Concept Plans proposed by UPC (DSP and DSP-V), the EIR analyzes the two Community Proposed Plans which the Brisbane City Council approved for study in July 2009, as well as a fifth, the Renewable Energy Alternative (REA) plan put forth by Citizens for Renewable Energy on the Bay Lands (CREBL), which included land for a solar energy farm.

Civic leaders hoping to host the 2024 Summer Olympics in San Francisco made a proposal in 2014 which included the construction of a temporary stadium for $350 million at the Brisbane Baylands to host opening and closing ceremonies. The Brisbane stadium was proposed as an alternative to a never-built new stadium for the Raiders in Oakland.

=== Potential annexation ===
In 2016, the Brisbane Planning Commission recommended dropping both DSP alternatives. Later, in September 2016, the Brisbane City Council indicated it preferred the CPP concept, which included a sustainability statement that "[t]here will be ample housing in the new developments planned across the border in San Francisco for those working in the Baylands who wish to live nearby", which drew criticism from officials in San Francisco and San Mateo County. However, the vote to endorse a specific concept was tabled and moved to 2017. In response, the San Francisco Board of Supervisors deliberated a resolution in October 2016 which, as originally written, directed San Francisco to investigate the feasibility of annexing Brisbane if housing was dropped from the Brisbane Baylands proposal.

Current residents and city leaders of Brisbane were resistant to the DSP concepts, believing that adding so many units of housing to the city would ruin its small-town character. The population of Brisbane in 2017 was estimated at 4,600. State politicians and organizations from outside Brisbane continued to express support for new housing, hoping to alleviate the local housing crisis.

=== 2018 election ===
The Brisbane City Council certified the EIR in July 2018, selecting a modified version of DSP with a reduced 2,200 homes, and moved the approval of the Brisbane Baylands to the November 2018 general election. At the time, Brisbane Mayor Clarke Conway stated "It was always my hope we'd never put housing out there", a view echoed by several residents. On the other side, supporters of the development hoped the added residences would keep rents affordable.

Measure JJ passed, amending the Brisbane General Plan to allow 1,800 to 2,200 residences and up to 7 million square feet of commercial development on the Brisbane Baylands. With the passage of Measure JJ, UPC can now submit a final development plan for city review. Although the General Plan has been amended according to Measure JJ, actual construction for Brisbane Baylands buildings could start as late as 2028, as more than four years would be required to develop and implement a required soil remediation plan before any basic infrastructure could be added.

In 2018, Brisbane voters approved Measure JJ, amending the city's general plan to permit development of the site; as of 2026, a specific plan implementing the development remained under review by the city.

=== 2026 housing element decertification ===
Following the passage of Measure JJ, UPC, through its affiliate Baylands Development Inc., pursued an updated Baylands Specific Plan through the city's review process. Brisbane adopted its 2023–2031 housing element on May 18, 2023, and the California Department of Housing and Community Development (HCD) certified its compliance with state housing element law on May 25, 2023. Because central Brisbane had limited zoning capacity, the housing element relied on the Baylands to accommodate most of the city's housing obligation, committing the city to adopt the specific plan and complete the associated rezoning within three years of adoption—by May 18, 2026. Housing advocacy groups, including the Housing Action Coalition and YIMBY Law, petitioned HCD to find the city out of compliance, describing Brisbane as repeatedly behind on its commitments to the project.

The city released the Baylands Specific Plan and its final environmental impact report for public review on May 14, 2026, and the Planning Commission began public hearings in June, but the rezoning was not completed by the statutory deadline. On July 1, 2026, HCD notified the city by letter that it had rescinded its certification of Brisbane's housing element. As of July 2026, Brisbane is ineligible for certain state grant funds, is subject to the builder's remedy—a provision of state housing law under which qualifying housing projects that do not conform to local zoning may proceed—and, according to HCD's letter, may face referral to the state attorney general and court-imposed penalties. The city attributed the delay to the complexity of the environmental review, including state regulatory approval of landfill closure and site remediation plans between 2021 and 2025 and coordination with the California High-Speed Rail Authority over a planned maintenance facility. It stated that the City Council would begin hearings on the specific plan on September 3, 2026, with certification expected to be reinstated once a compliant plan and rezoning are adopted.
