= Bayshore station (Caltrain) =

Train station in San Francisco, California, U.S.

Bayshore
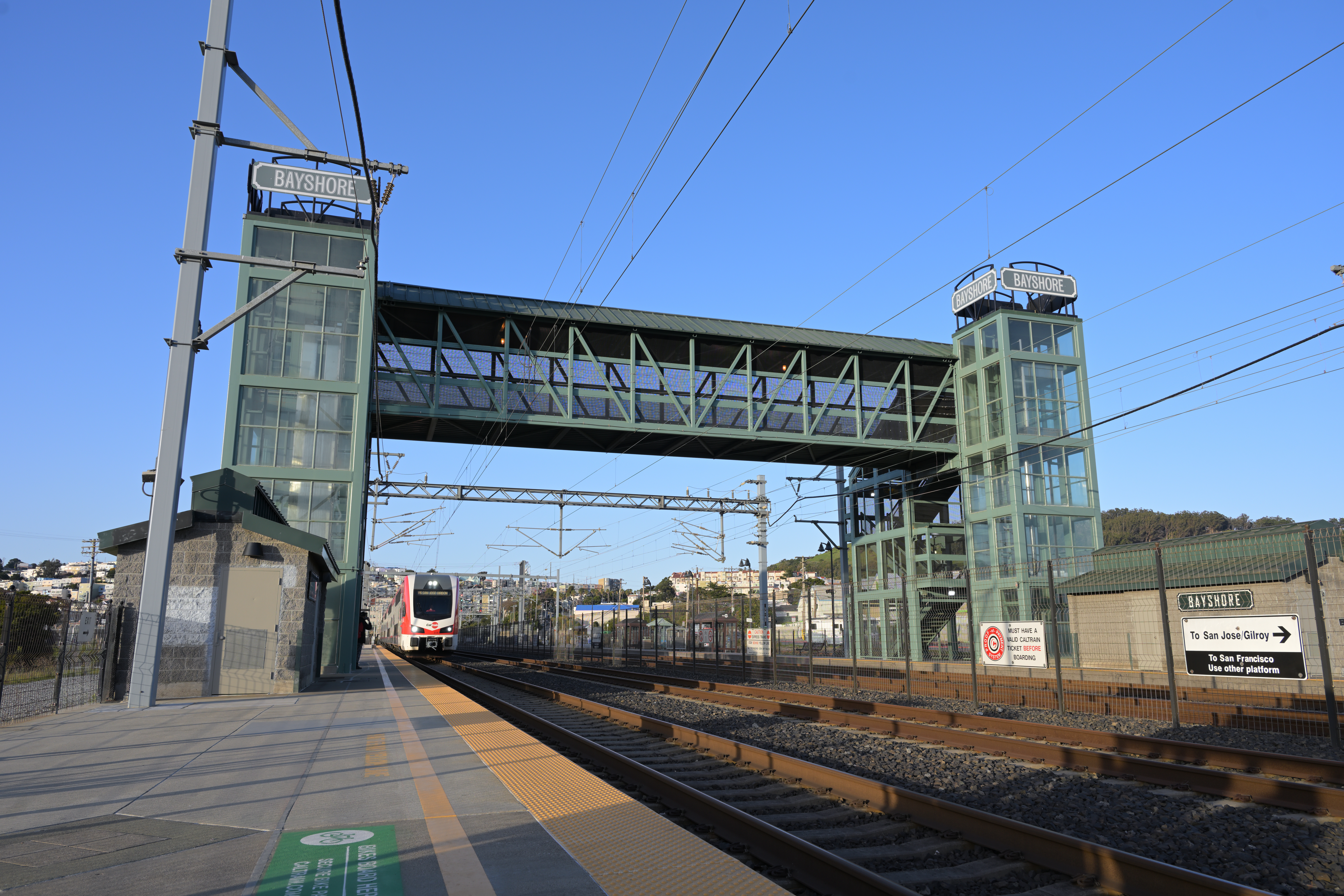
- Bayshore station in 2026

General information
- Location: 400 Tunnel Avenue; San Francisco, California
- Coordinates: 37°42′27″N 122°24′07″W
- Owner: Peninsula Corridor Joint Powers Board (PCJPB)
- Line: PCJPB Bayshore Cutoff (Peninsula Subdivision)
- Platforms: 2 side platforms
- Tracks: 4
- Connections: at Arleta; Bayshore/Brisbane Senior Shuttle; Commute.org: Brisbane-Bayshore Caltrain Shuttle; Muni: 8X, 8AX, 8BX, 9, 56; SamTrans: 292

Construction
- Parking: 38 spaces, paid
- Cycle facilities: 18 racks, lockers
- Accessible: Yes

Other information
- Fare zone: 1

History
- Opened: 1907
- Rebuilt: 2004

Passengers
- FY 2025: 130 per weekday ▲30%

Services
Preceding station	Caltrain	Following station
22nd Street toward San Francisco	Local	South San Francisco toward San Jose Diridon or Tamien
22nd Street toward San Francisco	Weekend Local	South San Francisco toward San Jose Diridon or Tamien
Limited does not stop here
Express does not stop here
Former services
Preceding station	Caltrain	Following station
22nd Street toward San Francisco	Local (L1)	South San Francisco toward San Jose Diridon or Tamien
22nd Street toward San Francisco	Weekend Local (L2)	South San Francisco toward San Jose Diridon or Tamien
Preceding station	Southern Pacific Railroad	Following station
23rd Street toward San Francisco	Coast Line	South San Francisco toward Los Angeles
Paul Avenue toward San Francisco	Peninsula Commute	Butler Road toward San Jose
Location

Bayshore station is a Caltrain commuter rail station in the Visitacion Valley neighborhood of San Francisco, California. The station is on the border of San Francisco and the neighboring city of Brisbane. The parking lot and the northern section of the station are in San Francisco, while the remainder is in Brisbane. The station address is in San Francisco proper.

Bayshore has four tracks: two side tracks for trains stopping at the station, and two in the middle for trains that do not stop at the station.

The station is located in an industrial area at the center of the proposed Brisbane Baylands development, making it the lowest ridership Caltrain station that receives regular weekday service.

== History ==
Bayshore was established by the Southern Pacific Railroad in 1907 along the new Bayshore Cutoff, a more direct route into San Francisco. The railroad planned to build an extensive terminal facility in Visitacion Valley that would serve as the primary maintenance and marshaling facility for the San Francisco Peninsula. Financial problems delayed completion of the project, and the 250-acre (1.0 km^{2}) Bayshore rail yard and shops did not open until 1918. The facility operated around the clock and employed over 1,000 workers.

The Bayshore shops maintained all the locomotives on the Southern Pacific's Coast Division which stretched south to Santa Barbara. By 1952, this was 133 steam engines, but by 1954, diesel-electric locomotives had become common enough that the Bayshore steam shops were closed. The roundhouse continued to service diesel locomotives, but the decline of industry and shipping in San Francisco and along the peninsula led to the closure of the yards in the early 1980s.

The station was fully rebuilt and shifted south as part of the Caltrain Express project to accommodate the four track cross section. The new station opened in its current location on March 22, 2004.

A $6.87 million reconstruction of the footbridge began in July 2022.

The station is planned to be modified to accommodate through-running California High-Speed Rail service.

== Unbuilt connection to Muni ==
The San Francisco Municipal Railway (Muni) intended to establish another light rail connection to the Bayshore station at Visitacion Valley in southern San Francisco with its new Third Street Light Rail Project. However, following the Caltrain Express, completed in 2004, the Bayshore station was rebuilt and moved south. As of 2018, the existing Bayshore station straddles the border between the counties of San Mateo and San Francisco; the platform itself is in Brisbane while the main parking lot is in San Francisco.

The T Third Street extension opened in early 2007 without a connection to Caltrain. The closest Muni station, Arleta station, is 0.4 miles (0.64 km) and approximately seven minutes (by foot) north from the Bayshore Caltrain station along Tunnel Avenue. Although Sunnydale Station is geographically closer to the Bayshore station, there is no public pathway running east–west directly connecting those two stations.

The potential connection has also been plagued by cost and design issues. Two proposed development projects adjacent to the station, the Visitacion Valley Transit Oriented Development Project (on the former site of the Schlage factory) and the Brisbane Baylands development (on the former Bayshore Railyard and San Francisco Municipal Landfill), could hasten the planning and conversion of Bayshore Station into an Intermodal Transit Station with a connection to Muni. The San Francisco County Transportation Authority adopted the Bayshore Intermodal Station Access Study in 2012. This study examined several alternatives, and proposed to move the platform south by 150 to 700 feet (46 to 213 m) to lie completely within San Mateo County. A loop extension of T Third would be built largely on San Mateo County land connecting the Sunnydale station to a new intermodal platform west of the Peninsula Corridor rail line on land planned for redevelopment as part of the Brisbane Baylands. According to the Bi-County Transportation Study (2013), the estimated cost of extending T Third is $58 million, with an additional $31 million required to reconfigure Bayshore station.

In addition, Geneva Avenue would be extended east from Bayshore Boulevard (where it presently dead-ends) over the rail line to Harney and would connect a proposed Muni bus rapid transit (BRT) line to Bayshore Station. In the Geneva-Harney BRT Feasibility Study final report, published in July 2015, all of the near-term alternatives for BRT alignment would use existing streets, connecting the new Geneva-Harney line with T Third at Arleta; the long-term alternatives studied would extend Geneva (with a grade separation and connection to Bayshore) by 2040, making a new intermodal station for bus, light rail, and heavy/commuter rail. According to the Bi-County Transportation Study (2013), the estimated cost of extending Geneva is $90 million, and an additional $210 million would be required to set up the Geneva-Harney BRT line.
