= Brisbane, California =

City in California, United States

- City
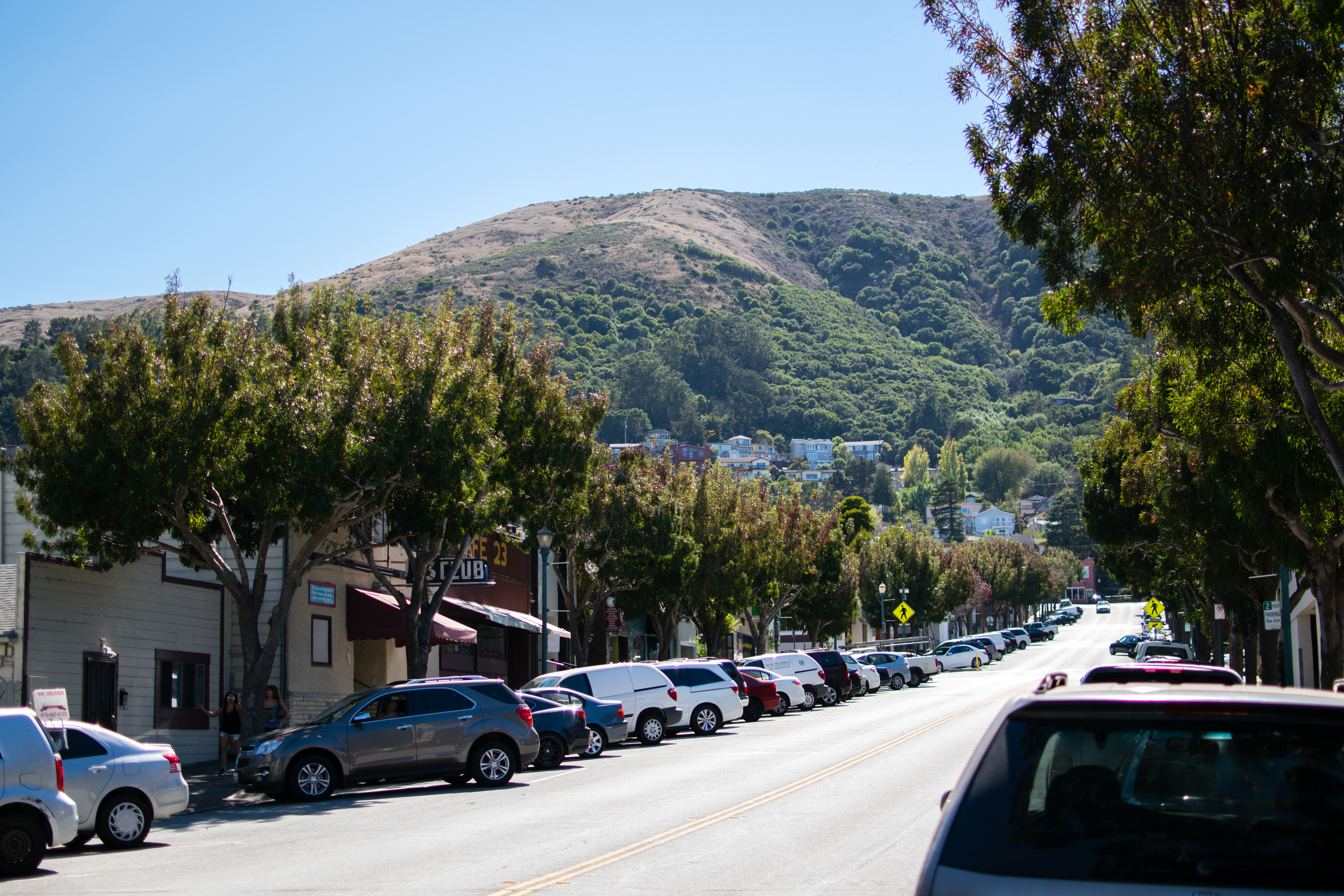
- Downtown Brisbane, CA

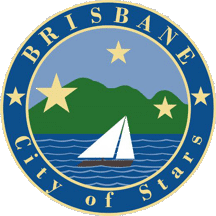
- Seal
- Nickname: City of Stars
- Interactive map of Brisbane, California
- Coordinates: 37°40′51″N 122°25′09″W
- Country: United States
- State: California
- County: San Mateo
- Incorporated: November 27, 1961

Government
  - Mayor: Clifford R. Lentz
  - Mayor pro tempore: Coleen Mackin
  - City Council: List of City Councilmembers: Terry O'Connell; Frank Kern; Madison Davis
  - City Manager: Jeremy Dennis

Area
  - Total: 19.97 sq mi (51.71 km^{2})
  - Land: 2.98 sq mi (7.73 km^{2})
  - Water: 16.98 sq mi (43.98 km^{2}) 84.58%
- Elevation: 108 ft (33 m)

Population (2020)
  - Total: 4,851
  - Density: 1,625.0/sq mi (627.42/km^{2})
- United States Census Bureau
- Time zone: UTC-8 (PST)
  - Summer (DST): UTC-7 (PDT)
- ZIP code: 94005
- Area codes: 415/628
- FIPS code: 06-08310
- GNIS feature ID: 1658137
- Website: brisbaneca.gov

Brisbane (pron. /ˈbrɪzbeɪn/ BRIZ-bayn) is a small city in San Mateo County, California, located on the lower slopes of the San Bruno Mountain. The city is on the northeastern edge of San Mateo County, located immediately south of the San Francisco city limits on the San Francisco Bay. The population was 4,851 as of the 2020 census.

Brisbane is called "The City of Stars" because of a holiday tradition dating back to 1939. At the start of the Christmas/Hanukkah season, many residents and business owners place large, illuminated stars, some as big as 10 feet (3.0 m) or more in diameter, on the downhill sides of homes and offices throughout Brisbane. Many of the stars are kept up all year.

== History ==
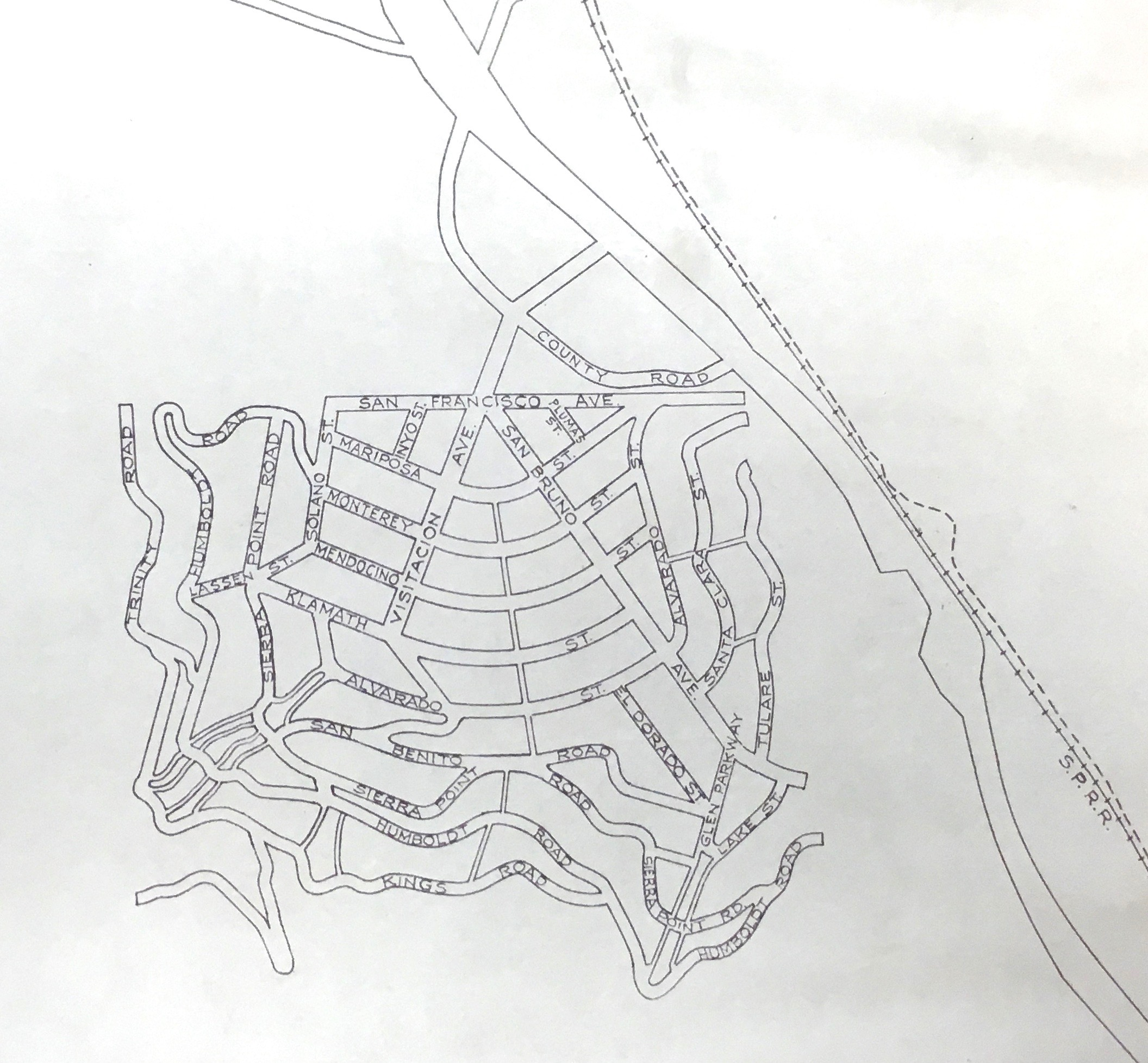
Recorded streets as of 1938

The first recorded inhabitants were the Costanoan Indians. They built dome-shaped dwellings of boughs and tules. By 1776, Spanish explorers had arrived and the Franciscan missionaries soon followed leaving numerous large land grants in their wake. With Mexican rule, the lands controlled by the Mission were released to private enterprise.

Brisbane was originally part of Rancho Cañada de Guadalupe la Visitación y Rodeo Viejo, a large tract of land that included the Cañada de Guadalupe (now Guadalupe Valley), and also the Bayshore district of Daly City, the Visitacion Valley district of San Francisco, and San Bruno Mountain. Visitacion City, as it was initially known, was platted in 1908 adjacent to a new rail line, the Bayshore Cutoff, that had been completed in 1907 to the east of the town site. The Southern Pacific Railroad built the new line to create a faster and more direct route into San Francisco. The railroad also planned to build extensive terminal facilities just north of the town site. The Visitacion Valley rail yard and locomotive works were expected to employ over 1,000 workers, but construction was halted soon after it began due to the Panic of 1907. The town site remained largely undeveloped for many years. The railroad resumed construction of the yard and shops during World War I, and the facilities were completed by 1918.

In the 1920s Arthur Annis proposed the name change from Visitacion City to Brisbane. Annis regarded the name Visitacion City as a handicap "being so close to a San Francisco city district with a similar name", which he felt would confuse people and prevent "Brisbane" from establishing its own unique identity. Accounts of how the city acquired its name vary. According to his daughter, the city was named for Brisbane, Queensland, perhaps due to the area's resemblance to that port city at the time. Another story holds that it was named for newspaper columnist Arthur Brisbane.

== Geography ==
According to the United States Census Bureau, the city has a total area of 20.1 square miles (52 km^{2}), of which 3.1 square miles (8.0 km^{2}) is land and 17.0 square miles (44 km^{2}) (84.58%) is water, the latter the Brisbane Lagoon. A remnant of San Francisco Bay, the lagoon was formed by the construction of the U.S. Highway 101 causeway, and became diminished as most of its north and central portions were filled with landfill. Brisbane sits at the southeast corner of the Guadalupe Valley.

Guadalupe Valley Creek is a small creek which flows east through Brisbane along the north flank of San Bruno Mountain and enters the Brisbane Lagoon after passing under the Tunnel Avenue bridge.

== Demographics ==
Historical population
Census	Pop.	Note	%±
1970	3,003		—
1980	2,969		−1.1%
1990	2,952		−0.6%
2000	3,597		21.8%
2010	4,282		19.0%
2020	4,851		13.3%
U.S. Decennial Census; 1860–1870 1880-1890; 1900 1910 1920; 1930 1940 1950; 1960 1970 1980; 1990 2000 2010; 2020

=== Racial and ethnic composition ===
Brisbane city, California – Racial and ethnic composition Note: the US Census treats Hispanic/Latino as an ethnic category. This table excludes Latinos from the racial categories and assigns them to a separate category. Hispanics/Latinos may be of any race.
Race / Ethnicity (NH = Non-Hispanic)	Pop 2000	Pop 2010	Pop 2020	% 2000	% 2010	% 2020
White alone (NH)	2,329	2,165	1,955	64.75%	50.56%	40.30%
Black or African American alone (NH)	35	80	88	0.97%	1.87%	1.81%
Native American or Alaska Native alone (NH)	13	10	10	0.36%	0.23%	0.21%
Asian alone (NH)	507	1,059	1,520	14.10%	24.73%	31.33%
Native Hawaiian or Pacific Islander alone (NH)	19	39	24	0.53%	0.91%	0.49%
Other race alone (NH)	20	20	56	0.56%	0.47%	1.15%
Mixed race or Multiracial (NH)	124	197	330	3.45%	4.60%	6.80%
Hispanic or Latino (any race)	550	712	868	15.29%	16.63%	17.89%
Total	3,597	4,282	4,851	100.00%	100.00%	100.00%

=== 2020 census ===
As of the 2020 census, Brisbane had a population of 4,851. The population density was 1,625.1 inhabitants per square mile (627.5/km^{2}). The median age was 42.5 years. 18.6% of residents were under the age of 18, 5.6% were aged 18 to 24, 29.3% were aged 25 to 44, 30.2% were aged 45 to 64, and 16.3% were 65 years of age or older. For every 100 females, there were 99.2 males, and for every 100 females age 18 and over, there were 100.2 males.

99.7% of the population lived in households, 0.3% lived in non-institutionalized group quarters, and no one was institutionalized. 99.4% of residents lived in urban areas, while 0.6% lived in rural areas.

There were 1,955 households, of which 31.4% had children under the age of 18 living in them. Of all households, 49.8% were married-couple households, 9.1% were cohabiting couple households, 19.3% were households with a male householder and no spouse or partner present, and 21.8% were households with a female householder and no spouse or partner present. About 24.4% of all households were made up of individuals and 9.7% had someone living alone who was 65 years of age or older. The average household size was 2.47. There were 1,271 families (65.0% of all households).

There were 2,052 housing units at an average density of 687.4 units per square mile (265.4 units/km^{2}), of which 1,955 (95.3%) were occupied. Of occupied units, 63.9% were owner-occupied and 36.1% were occupied by renters. Of all housing units, 4.7% were vacant. The homeowner vacancy rate was 0.6% and the rental vacancy rate was 4.8%.

Racial composition as of the 2020 census
Race	Number	Percent
White	2,114	43.6%
Black or African American	89	1.8%
American Indian and Alaska Native	30	0.6%
Asian	1,539	31.7%
Native Hawaiian and Other Pacific Islander	24	0.5%
Some other race	365	7.5%
Two or more races	690	14.2%

=== Income and poverty ===
In 2023, the US Census Bureau estimated that the median household income was $151,593, and the per capita income was $103,841. About 11.0% of families and 7.3% of the population were below the poverty line.

=== 2010 census ===
The 2010 United States census reported that Brisbane had a population of 4,282. The population density was 213.3 inhabitants per square mile (82.4/km^{2}). The racial makeup of Brisbane was 2,578 (60.2%) White, 80 (1.9%) African American, 21 (0.5%) Native American, 1,084 (25.3%) Asian, 41 (1.0%) Pacific Islander, 182 (4.3%) from other races, and 296 (6.9%) from two or more races. Hispanic or Latino of any race were 712 persons (16.6%).

The Census reported that 4,266 people (99.6% of the population) lived in households, 16 (0.4%) lived in non-institutionalized group quarters, and 0 (0%) were institutionalized.

There were 1,821 households, out of which 514 (28.2%) had children under the age of 18 living in them, 808 (44.4%) were opposite-sex married couples living together, 159 (8.7%) had a female householder with no husband present, 96 (5.3%) had a male householder with no wife present. There were 128 (7.0%) unmarried opposite-sex partnerships, and 59 (3.2%) same-sex married couples or partnerships. 554 households (30.4%) were made up of individuals, and 122 (6.7%) had someone living alone who was 65 years of age or older. The average household size was 2.34. There were 1,063 families (58.4% of all households); the average family size was 2.94.

The population was spread out, with 825 people (19.3%) under the age of 18, 213 people (5.0%) aged 18 to 24, 1,356 people (31.7%) aged 25 to 44, 1,459 people (34.1%) aged 45 to 64, and 429 people (10.0%) who were 65 years of age or older. The median age was 41.7 years. For every 100 females, there were 100.7 males. For every 100 females age 18 and over, there were 99.8 males.

There were 1,934 housing units at an average density of 96.3 per square mile (37.2/km^{2}), of which 1,169 (64.2%) were owner-occupied, and 652 (35.8%) were occupied by renters. The homeowner vacancy rate was 1.3%; the rental vacancy rate was 5.5%. 2,936 people (68.6% of the population) lived in owner-occupied housing units and 1,330 people (31.1%) lived in rental housing units.

== Economy ==
Brisbane's economy is dominated by office parks at Sierra Point and an industrial park around the Valley Drive corridor. There are commercial areas at Brisbane Village, Visitacion Avenue, and Bayshore Avenue. The population of Brisbane doubles during the work day as such facilities fill up with commuters. Some of the larger office tenants in Brisbane are Cutera Inc., Dolby, Tercica, Sing Tao, and Intermune. Monster Cable Products and bebe stores (traditionally spelled in lowercase) are headquartered in Brisbane on Valley Drive. The Sierra Point office park area is home to a number of well-known class A office buildings like the Dakin Building.

Universal Paragon's proposed 659-acre (2.67 km^{2}) Brisbane Baylands project, if approved by Brisbane voters, proposes to more than double the existing employment base of the city by providing new office, research & development, retail, hotel and other land uses that are accessible by a proposed multi-modal transit station (Caltrain, Muni T-Third light rail and proposed Bus Rapid Transit).

=== Parks and open space ===
Brisbane is home to San Bruno Mountain as well as a number of city parks. San Bruno Mountain is known for its views of the City, and the native Mission Blue butterfly. City parks in Brisbane include the Community Park in the center of town (1 Visitacion Ave.) the Fire Hydrant Plug Preserve (300 Mariposa St.) and Firth Park (100 Lake St.) and The Brisbane Dog Park ( 50 Park Pl.)

=== Top employers ===
According to the city's 2022 Comprehensive Annual Financial Report, the top employers in the city are:

#	Employer	# of Employees
1	Bi-Rite Food Service Distributors	243
2	Expeditors International of Washington	242
3	LeeMAH Electronics Inc.	238
4	Cutera, Inc.	226
5	Greenleaf Produce	161
6	Ultragenyx	148
7	Amazon Fresh	142
8	Transdev Services Inc	135
9	Hensley Event Resources	127
10	Norman S. Wright Mechanical Equipment	117

== Government ==
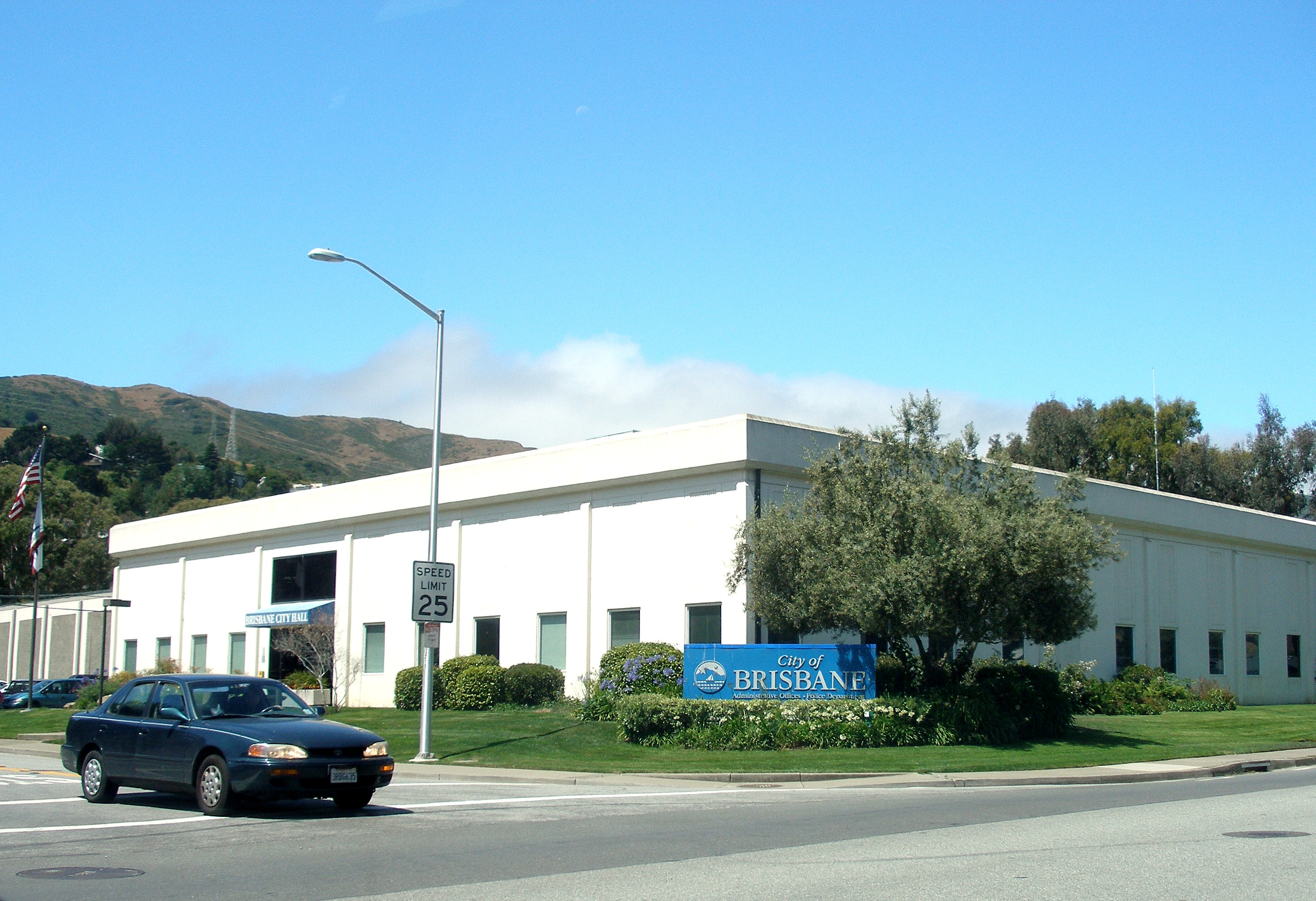
Brisbane City Hall

In the California State Legislature, Brisbane is in the 13th senatorial district, represented by Democrat Josh Becker, and in the 21st Assembly district, represented by Democrat Diane Papan.

In the United States House of Representatives, Brisbane is in California's 15th congressional district, represented by Democrat Kevin Mullin.

The mayor is Clifford R Lentz, and Coleen Mackin is Mayor Pro Tempore.

According to the California Secretary of State, as of February 10, 2019, Brisbane has 2,794 registered voters. Of those, 1,455 (52.1%) are registered Democrats, 292 (10.5%) are registered Republicans, and 906 (32.4%) have declined to state a political party.

== Education ==
The city is served by the Brisbane Public Library. This library is part of the San Mateo County Libraries library system, which is in turn a member of the Peninsula Library System.

== Transportation ==
The main arterial road serving Brisbane is Bayshore Boulevard. The boulevard continues north to San Francisco and south to South San Francisco and SFO. U.S. Route 101 also goes past the city on the eastern side adjacent to San Francisco Bay.

SamTrans provides bus service through the city along Bayshore Boulevard. Shuttles connecting to nearby BART, Muni T-Third Street line and Caltrain stations are available to residents and employees in the city.
