= Arleta station =

Light rail station in San Francisco, California

Arleta
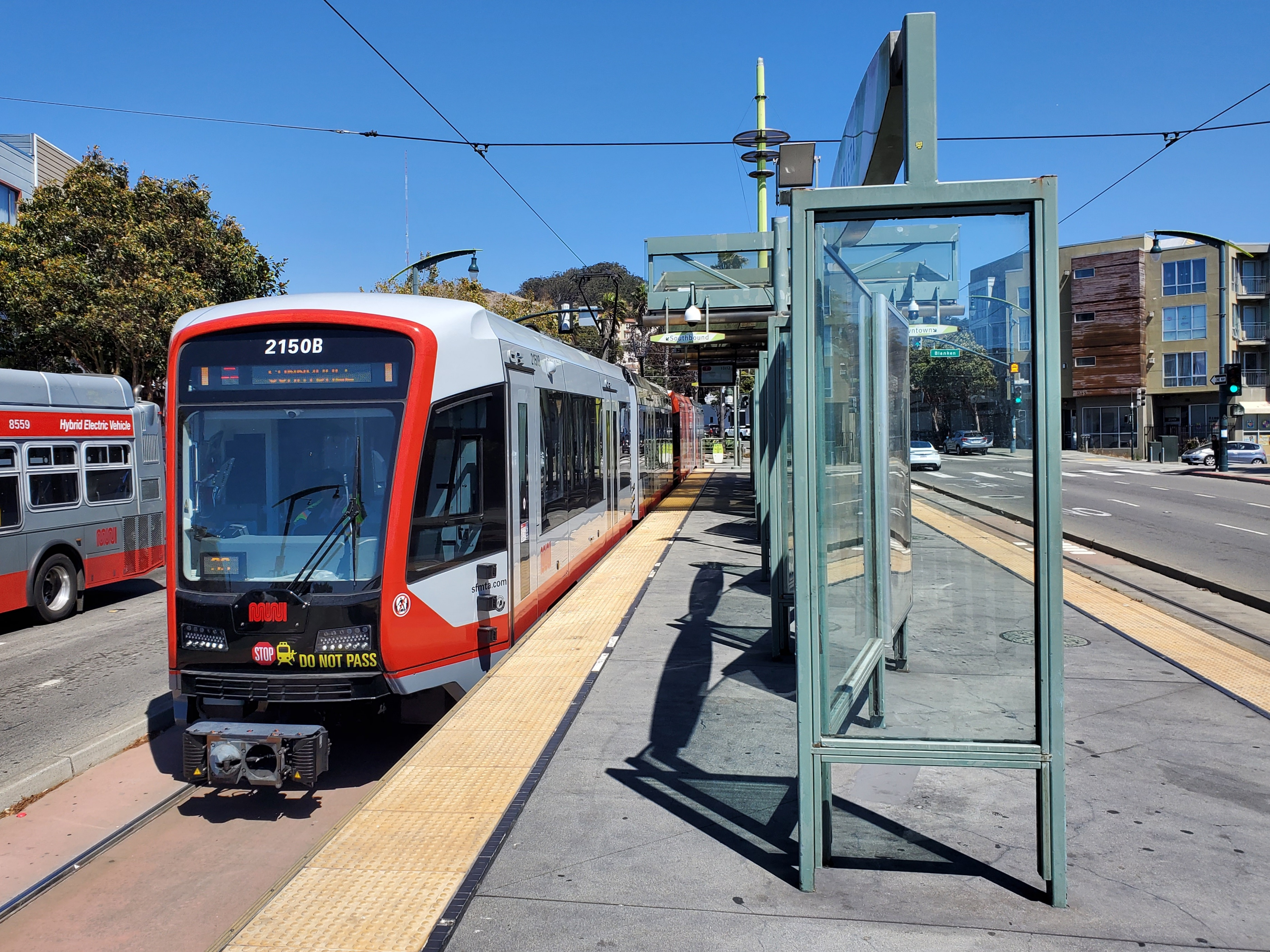
- Southbound train at Arleta station in August 2025

General information
- Location: Bayshore Boulevard at Arleta Avenue; San Francisco, California
- Coordinates: 37°42′45″N 122°24′09″W
- Platforms: 1 island platform
- Tracks: 2
- Connections: Caltrain (at Bayshore station); Commute.org: Brisbane-Bayshore Caltrain Shuttle; Muni: 8, 8AX, 8BX, 9, 9R, 56; SamTrans: 292

Construction
- Accessible: Yes

History
- Opened: January 13, 2007

Services
Preceding station	Muni	Following station
Le Conte toward Chinatown	T Third Street	Sunnydale Terminus
Location

Arleta station is a light rail station on the Muni Metro T Third Street line in the Visitacion Valley neighborhood of San Francisco, California on the south slope of Candlestick Hill. The station opened with the T Third Street line on January 13, 2007. It has a single island platform located in the median of Bayshore Boulevard between Arleta Avenue and Blanken Avenue, with access from crosswalks at both streets.

Arleta is the closest Muni Metro stop to the Caltrain station at Bayshore station, which is 0.4 miles (0.6 km) to the south.

The station is also served by Muni bus routes 8, 8AX, 8BX (a pair of weekday peak hours express services), 9, 9R (a limited-stop rapid service), 56 and 90 Owl (an All Nighter service) plus the T Bus and 91 Owl bus routes, which provide service along the T Third Street line during the early morning and late night hours respectively when trains do not operate. Additionally, Commute.org's Brisbane-Bayshore Caltrain Shuttle and SamTrans routes 292 and 397 (an All Nighter service) stop at the station.
