= Butler Road station =

Former train station in South San Francisco, California

Butler Road
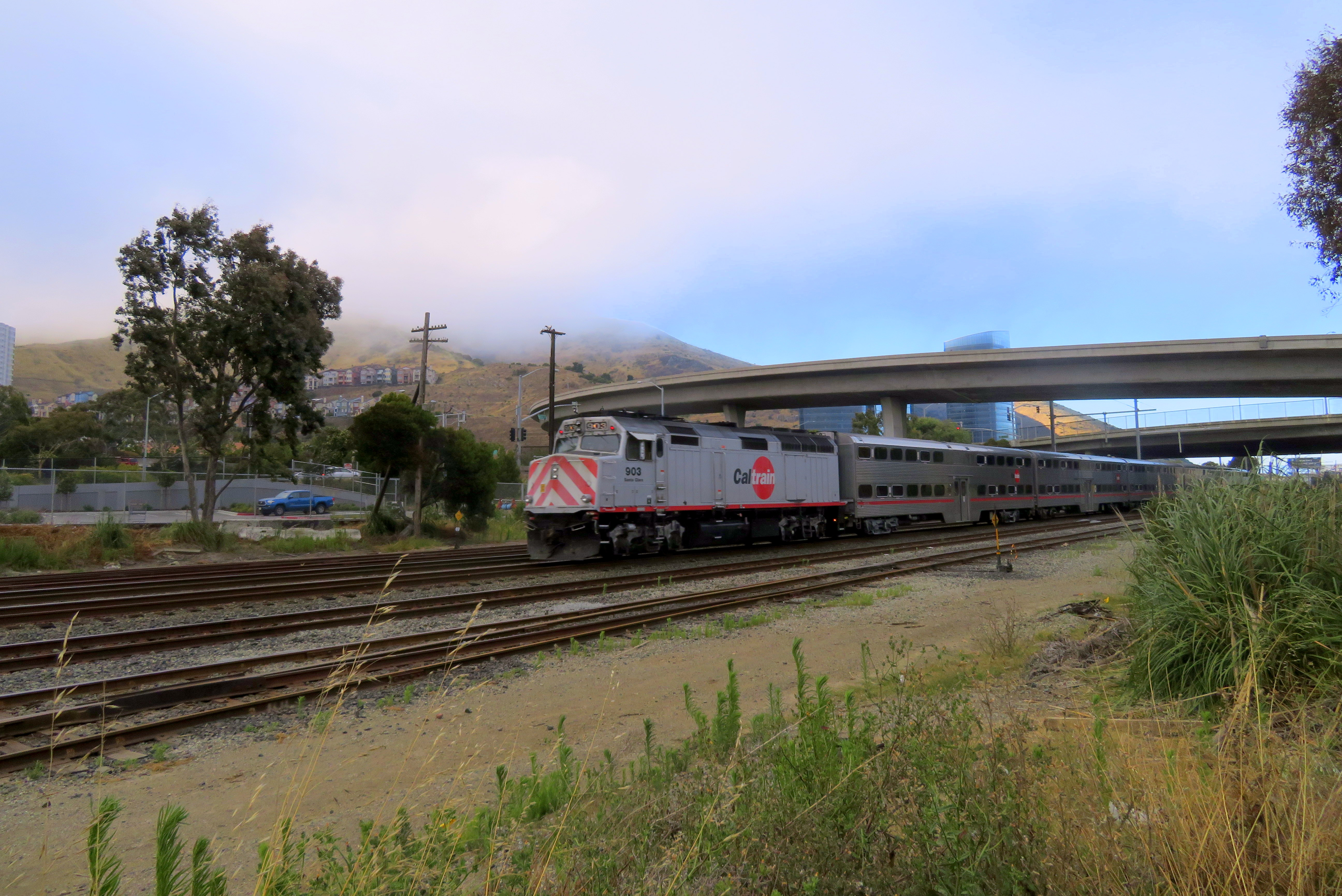
- A train passing the former station site in 2018

General information
- Location: Oyster Point Boulevard (Butler Road); South San Francisco, California
- Coordinates: 37°39′46″N 122°23′54″W
- Line: PCJPB Peninsula Subdivision

History
- Closed: July 1983

Former services
| Preceding station | Southern Pacific Railroad | Following station |
|---|---|---|
| Bayshore toward San Francisco | Peninsula Commute | South San Francisco toward San Jose |
| Visitacion toward San Francisco | Coast Line | South San Francisco toward Los Angeles |
Location

Butler Road station was a train station in South San Francisco, California, in operation until July 1983 on the Peninsula Commute, a commuter rail service run by Southern Pacific between San Francisco and communities on the San Francisco Peninsula. The Butler Road train shelter was built in 1926.

== History ==
The stop was next to the Shaw-Batcher steel mill, which opened in 1913; the mill was purchased by the Western Pipe and Steel Company in 1917. 200 acres (81 ha) of land were acquired for a shipyard in August 1917, and Shaw-Batcher was awarded a $30 million contract to build 18 merchant ships during World War I. The worksite population grew from 200 in early 1917 to 4,447 by July 1918, a month after the company's first ship was launched. After the war, Western Pipe moved shipbuilding operations to San Pedro and continued to produce pipe in South San Francisco, which was used in notable dam projects such as Hetch Hetchy, Grand Coulee, Shasta, and Folsom. The shipyard was reactivated in 1939 for World War II, and after the war ended, the site was sold in 1948 to Consolidated Steel (later United States Steel and its divisions), which closed the mill in 1983. Service to the Butler Road stop was also discontinued that year.

The Butler Road stop was relatively little-used for much of its existence. In 1958, for example, only four of the 27 total northbound weekday commuter trains stopped at the station. In 1978, only three of the 22 total northbound weekday trains stopped there.

Butler Road, the roadway itself, has been renamed Oyster Point Boulevard. The Peninsula Commute service was taken over by the State of California and renamed Caltrain in 1985.
