= Sierra Point =

Sierra Point is the name of several locations:

- Sierra Point (Brisbane), a small peninsula in Brisbane, California
- Sierra Point (Yosemite), a hiking trail and vista in Yosemite National Park
