= San Francisco Crosstown Trails =

Urban hiking trails in San Francisco

The San Francisco Crosstown Trails are three urban hikes connecting the corners and edges of San Francisco.

The trails include the Crosstown Trail (created in 2019 by Bob Siegel and a coalition of community volunteers and activists), the Double Cross Trail (created in 2023), and the Roundabout (created in 2025).

View from Crosstown Trail

== The Crosstown Trail ==
The Crosstown Trail is 17 miles long and runs diagonally through the city. The route runs through various parks and green spaces in San Francisco, including Golden Gate Heights Park, Blue Heron Lake, and the Presidio. It begins at the southeast corner of the city in Candlestick Point and ends at the northwest corner of the city in Lands End. The trail has almost no signage and no paid staff. It now has over 5000 reviews on the hiking and outdoor fitness app AllTrails.

The trail opened to the public on National Trails Day, June 1, in 2019.

== The Double Cross Trail ==
The Double Cross Trail is a 15 mile hike that runs diagonally through the city in the opposite direction of the Crosstown Trail. It begins at the southwest corner of the city at Fort Funston and ends at the northeast corner of the city near Civic Center. The trail was created in 2023 by a group of friends who had hiked the Crosstown Trail.

== The Roundabout ==
The Roundabout is the newest edition to the San Francisco Crosstown Trails. It is the longest of the three trails, spanning 38 miles around the perimeter of the city. The trail both starts and ends at the Ferry Building.

Bob Siegel said creators wanted to use The Roundabout to "showcase another side of the city" and "show that there are a lot of trails you may not know about.”

San Francisco Crosstown Trail passing through the woods near Laguna Honda Hospital

View from McLaren Park which is on Crosstown Trail
