= Candlestick Point State Recreation Area =

State park unit of California, United States

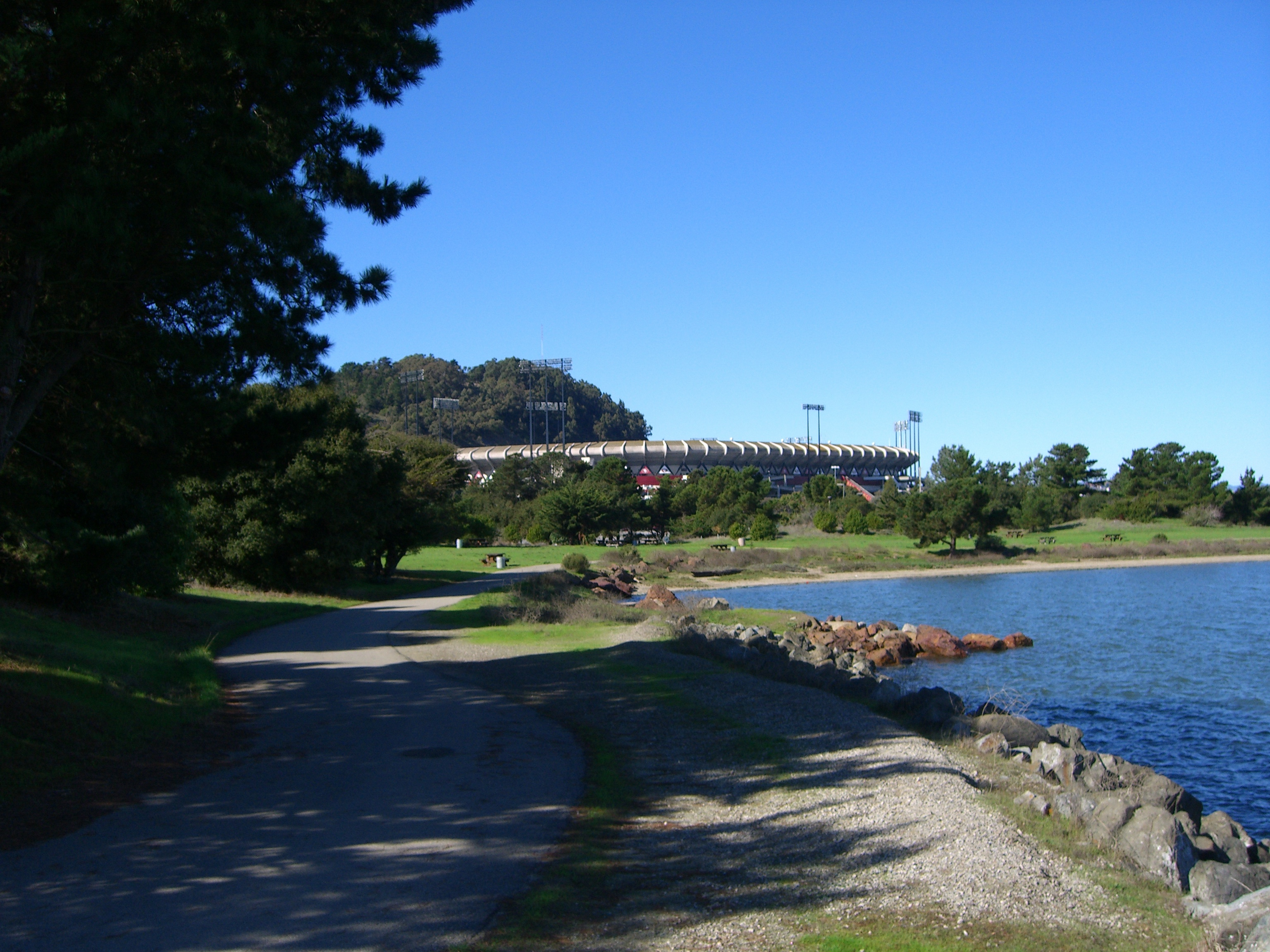
- A walking path with Candlestick Park in the background

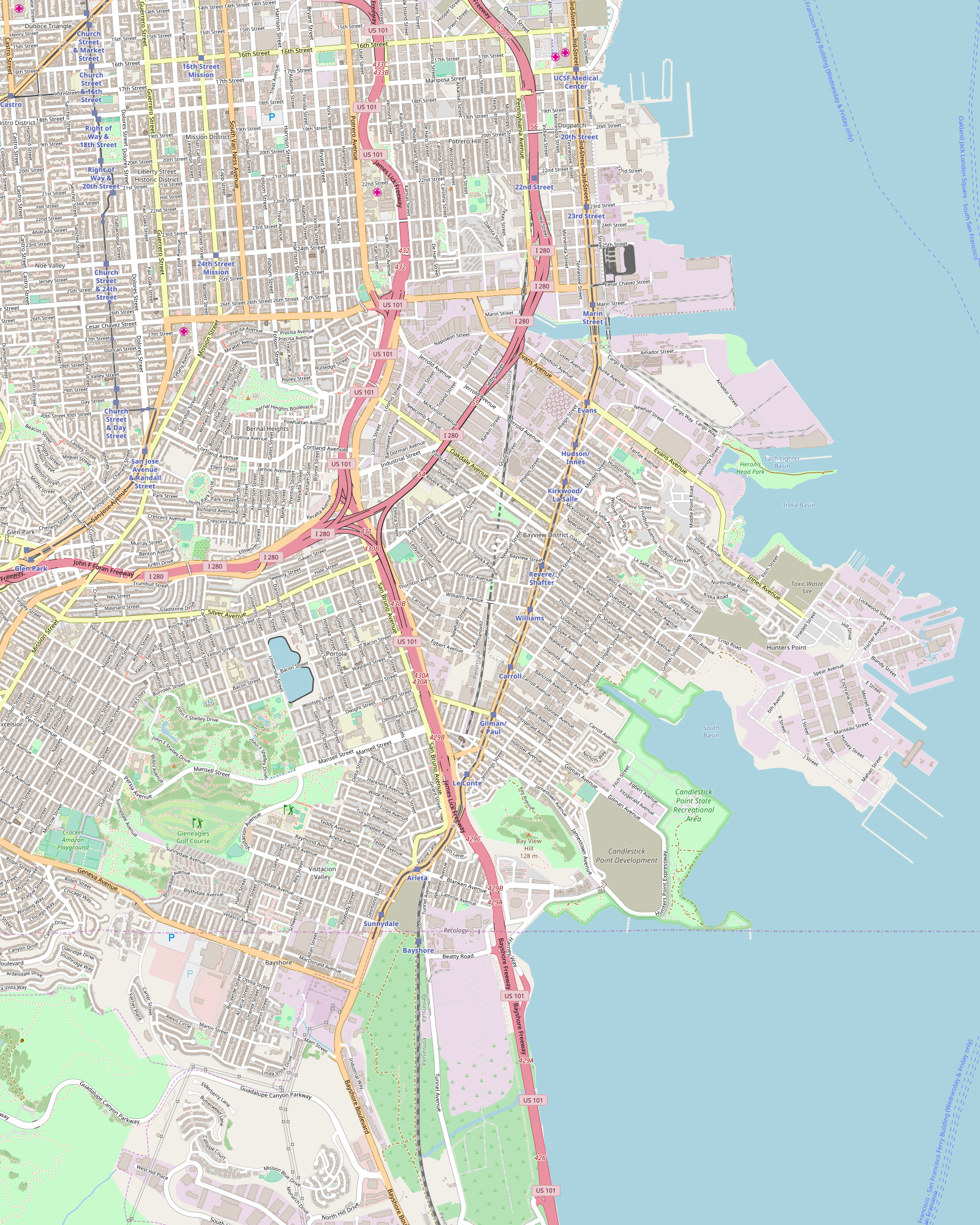
- Location within Bayview-Hunters Point Location within San Francisco County
- Location: San Francisco County, California, US
- Nearest city: San Francisco, California
- Coordinates: 37°42′35″N 122°22′49″W
- Area: 204 acres (83 ha)
- Established: 1972
- Operator: California Department of Parks and Recreation

Candlestick Point State Recreation Area (or simply Candlestick Point) is a state park unit of California, United States, providing an urban protected area on San Francisco Bay. The park is located at the southeastern tip of San Francisco immediately south of Hunters Point and 2 miles (3.2 km) north of Sierra Point in Brisbane. This 170-acre (69 ha) landfilled area was intended to be used during World War II as a shipyard by the United States Navy. However it was abandoned as the war ended. Without government controls, the area was used by nearby residences as a garbage dump. In 1973 the California State Legislature purchased the land with US$10 million and in 1977 voted to turn this area into a California State Park. After the designation Candlestick became the first urban recreation area in the state. To this day Candlestick remains as a major recreation area in San Francisco, offering a wide view of the bay. The park features various picnic areas, two fishing piers, fitness courses as well as hiking trails. This park is also a popular area for windsurfing due to strong and regular winds.

Candlestick Park, the former stadium of the San Francisco Giants and San Francisco 49ers, was also located next to Candlestick Point.

There are several competing theories for the origin of the point's name. Several sources claim it was named for Candlestick Rock, an 8-foot (2.4 m)-tall pinnacle rock once located nearby at the high-tide line. Others claim it was named for the long-billed curlew, which was once plentiful in the area and also known as the candlestick bird. Still others claim the name derives from the 19th-century practice of burning abandoned sailing ships in the bay; as they sank their flaming masts resembled lighted candlesticks.

== Proposed park closures reversed ==
Candlestick Point was one of the 48 California state parks that were proposed for closure in January 2008 by California Governor Arnold Schwarzenegger as part of a deficit reduction effort.

In May 2008, the governor unveiled his revised proposal that would reverse a proposal made in January to dismiss employees and close 48 parks and beaches, including nine in the Bay Area. The plan now is to cut $1.5 million out of the parks budget and make that up by raising entrance fees a maximum of $2. Revenue also could be raised through cabin rentals and fees at new campgrounds.

== See also ==
- List of California state parks
- San Francisco Crosstown Trail
