= Dakin Building =

Office building in California, U.S.

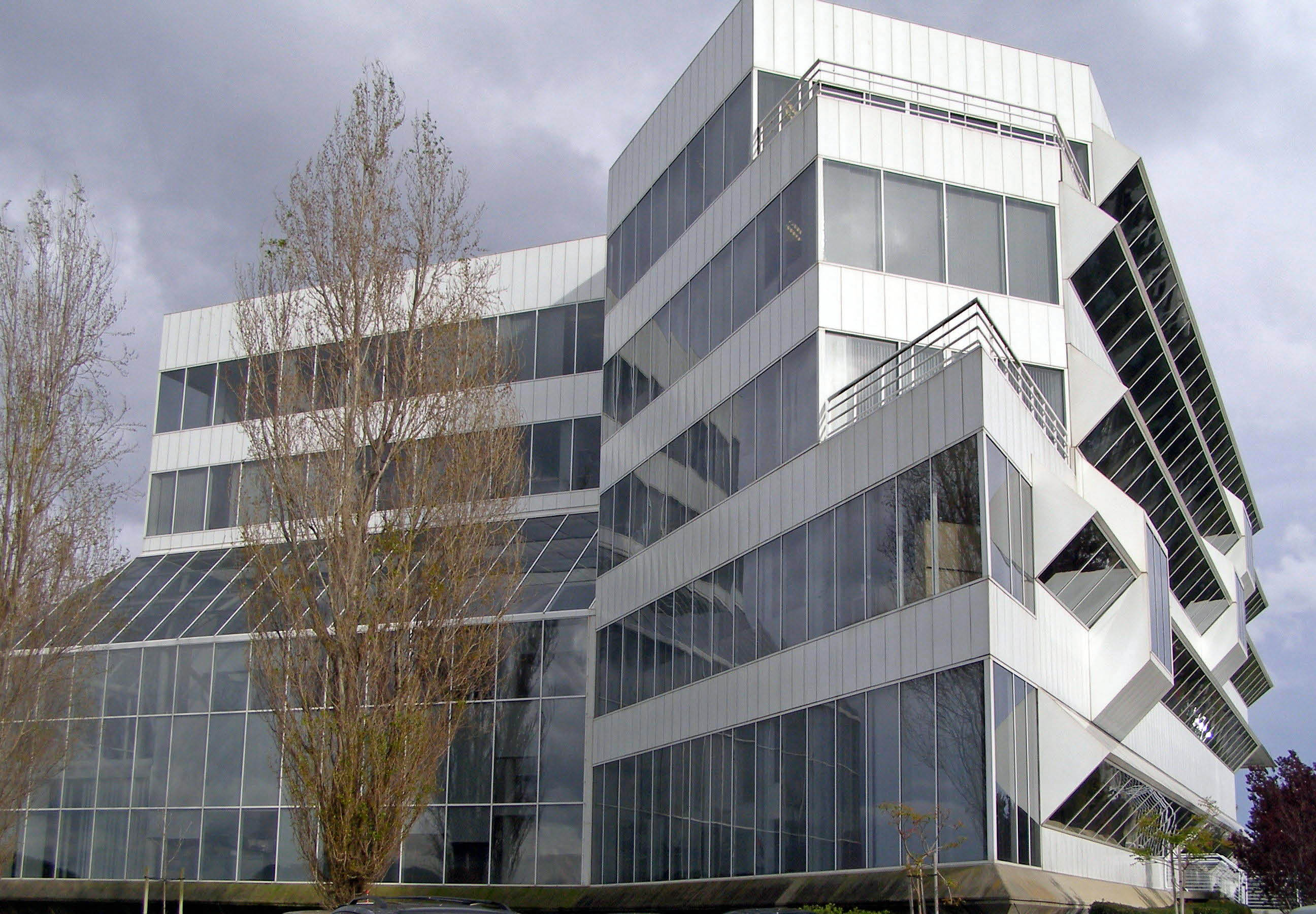
- The Dakin Building, northern and southwestern facades, as seen from the north along the San Francisco Bay Trail

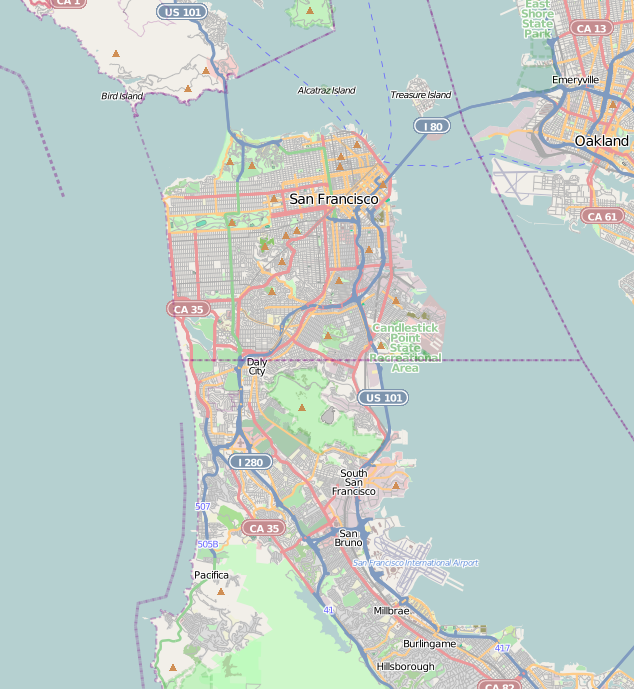
- Location within San Francisco

General information
- Type: office
- Location: 7000 Marina Boulevard, Brisbane, California, United States
- Coordinates: 37.6767°N 122.3842°W
- Completed: 1986

Technical details
- Floor count: 5
- Floor area: 87,695 square feet (8,147.1 m^{2})

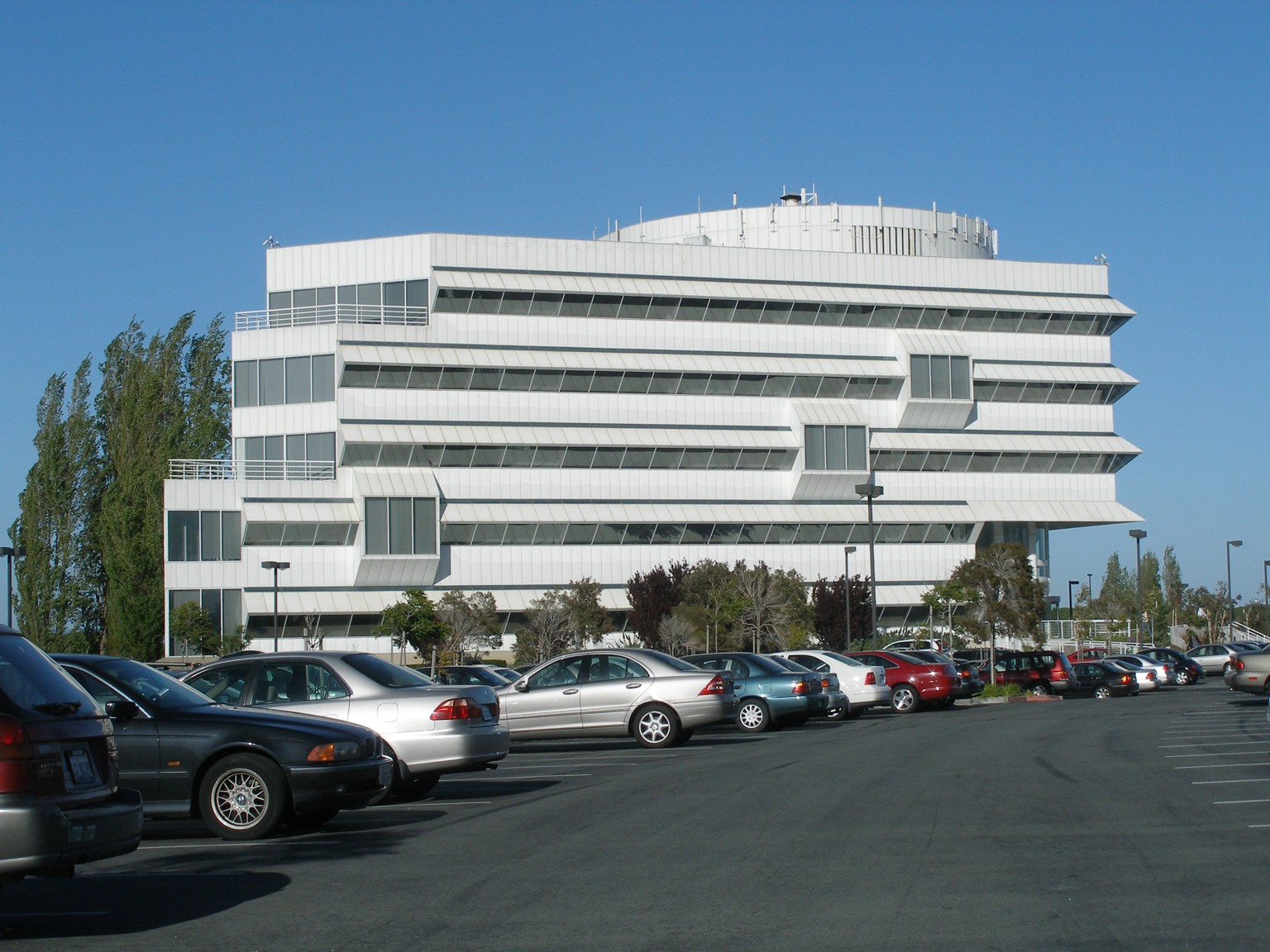
Southwestern facade of the Dakin Building, as seen from adjacent parking lot on a sunny spring afternoon in 2007. The prominent awning/window system was removed during a remodel which completed in 2016.

The Dakin Building is an architectural award-winning class A office building on the San Francisco Bay in Brisbane, California. Serving as a corporate headquarters building for several companies of national prominence, it was built from the profits of the Garfield character whose licensed products of the R. Dakin & Company division of Applause Toys soared in sales in the late 1980s. Located on Sierra Point, it became a landmark in the San Francisco Bay Area for its distinctive design and was nicknamed the Luke Skywalker building for its dramatic posture overlooking the bay, in contrast to a neighboring office building with a dark, ominous appearance that was nicknamed the Darth Vader building.

== Ownership and history ==
The Dakin Building was constructed in 1986 under commission of the R. Dakin & Co., one of the largest manufacturers of plush products (mainly teddy bears) in the United States at that time. Dakin was in a large upswing of sales and profits in the late 1980s fueled by success of its Garfield character licenses, and needed to accommodate its burgeoning staff of artists and designers. Not long after completion of the building, several of the company founding key executives were killed in a light aircraft accident.

In a financial and sales tailspin, the R. Dakin Company proceeded to sell this headquarters building to C. Michael Hogan, president of Earth Metrics Inc., an environmental research and consulting firm. Earth Metrics then moved into two floors of the building, as Dakin compressed its operations. At Dakin's request, The Good Guys! were secured as a major tenant in 1992, and the new owner performed substantial tenant improvements of approximately $1,300,000, upgrading the computer room infrastructure and building an auditorium.

Foster Enterprises purchased the entire holding in 1995. Foster Enterprises is the successor entity of T. Jack Foster, a wealthy real estate magnate, for whom Foster City, California is named, since Foster owned and developed most of that San Francisco Peninsula city of population around 30,000. The Dakin Building and an adjoining building at 5000 Marina were sold in December 2005.

The current tenant is Sangamo Therapeutics, who announced they would move to the site in 2017. Prior to Sangamo, the building served as the headquarters of Walmart Global eCommerce from approximately 2000 until 2010, when the eCommerce headquarters moved to San Bruno. The property is owned by Westport Capital Partners, managed by CBRE Group, and marketed as Marina Landing alongside the neighboring building at 5000 Marina Blvd. 5000 Marina is leased to Ultragenyx.

=== Role during Glasnost ===
During the Glasnost period, the Dakin building was a primary location central to development of relationships between Russians (then Soviet citizens) and Americans. Philanthropist Henry Dakin, chairman of the Dakin Company, was the catalyst in bringing numerous parties together from the Soviet Union and United States. As reported by the San Francisco Chronicle: "During the late 1980s, as glasnost and perestroika led to the liquidation of the Soviet empire, the Dakin building was the location for a series of groups facilitating United States-Russian contacts. They included the Center for U.S.-U.S.S.R. Initiatives, which helped more than 1000 Americans visit the Soviet Union and more than 400 then-Soviet citizens visit the U.S."

== Siting and physical design ==
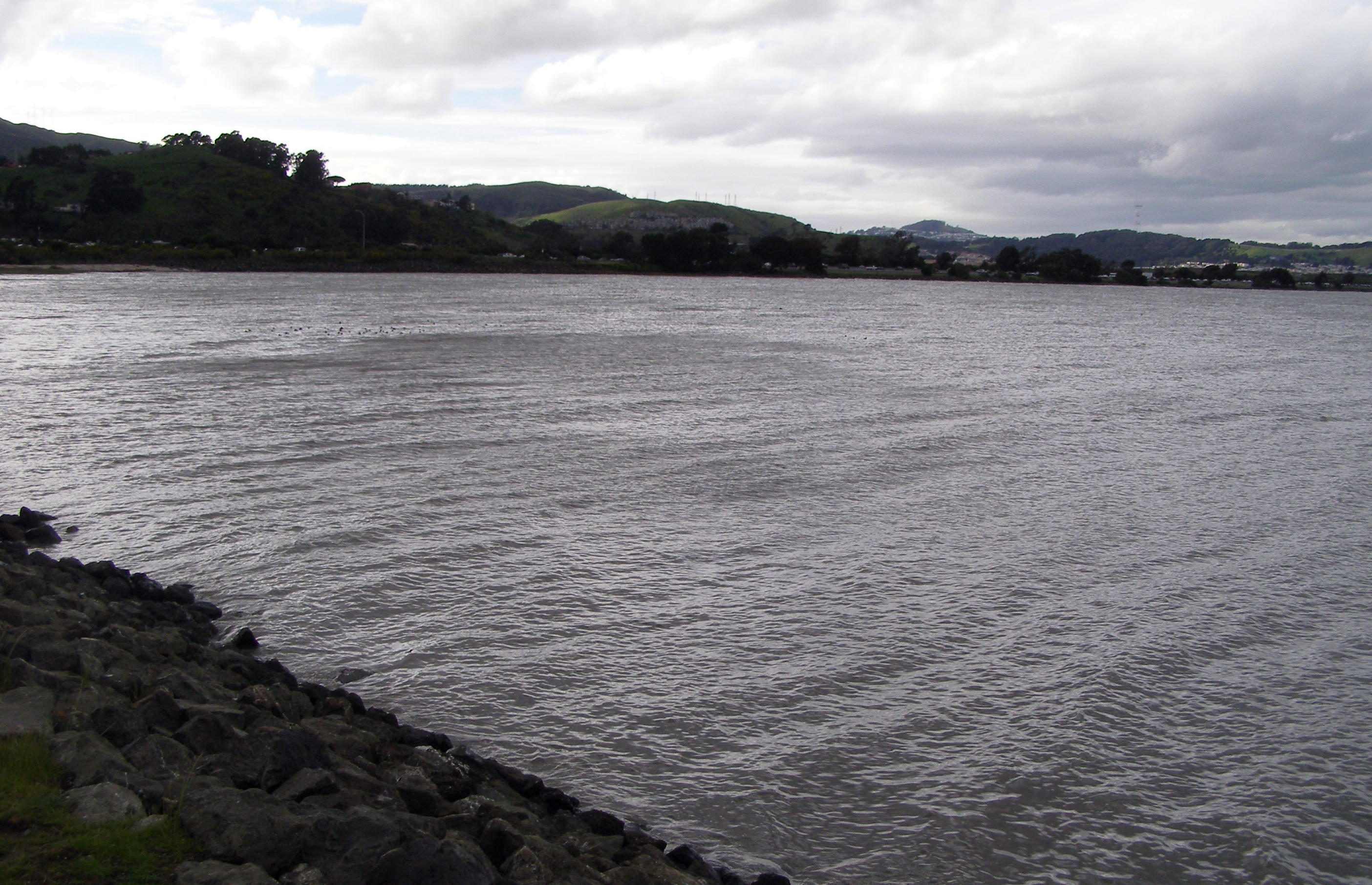
Looking northwest from the Dakin Building campus over San Francisco Bay toward San Bruno Mountain. This arm of the bay is the location where Humphrey the whale was rescued.

The building is situated on a San Francisco Bay shoreline frontage parcel with almost 1/4 mile (0.40 km) of bay frontage. From above, the building plan resembles an isosceles right triangle; the base of the triangle faces the bayfront to the north and has the large glass atrium protruding from its center, and the equal-length sides face to the southwest and southeast. The circular penthouse is near the apex formed by the two equal-length sides. The 8-acre (32,000 m^{2}) parcel at Sierra Point has a commanding view of the central portion of the San Francisco Bay, the city of San Francisco, San Bruno Mountain and Candlestick Park. The Dakin Building is close to the Sierra Point Marina and lies about 4 miles (6.4 km) north of San Francisco International Airport.

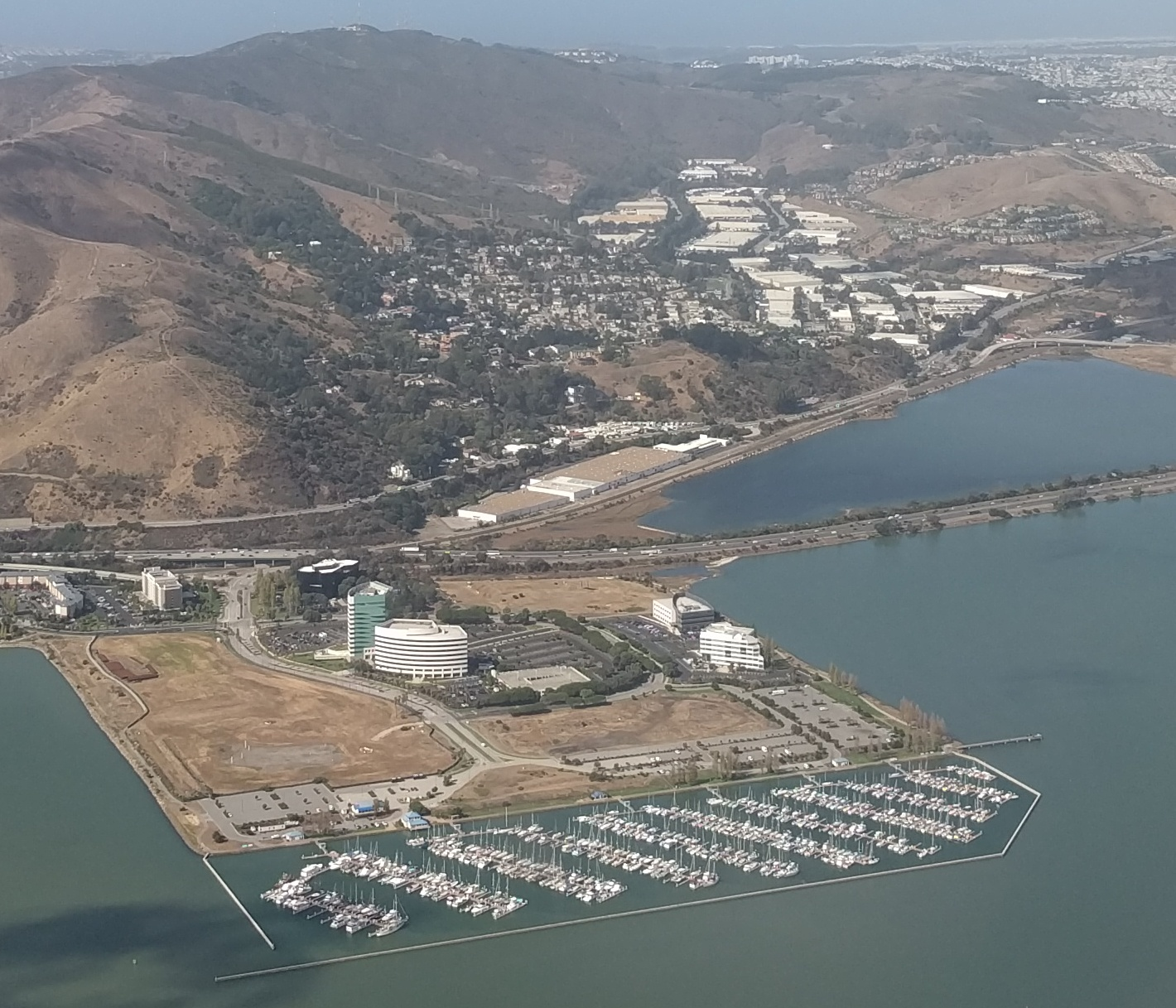
Aerial view facing west-northwest (2016); San Bruno Mountain rises immediately to the west of the square-shaped Sierra Point; the Dakin Building can be seen on the northern (right) edge of the artificial peninsula.

The underlying site was constructed from bay fill activities from 1965 to 1985, mostly consisting of construction debris from San Francisco. Aerial photographs prior to 1965 show this area to be tidelands of the San Francisco Bay. A clay cap was constructed over the debris prior to building approval. The Dakin building was built over thick bay mud formations that were expected to subside up to 10 feet (3.0 m) by 2006; therefore, the main entrance ramp was built on a giant hinge to allow the earth to settle, while the building, resting on driven piles, remains stationary. The year 2006 arrived, and the flexibility in the ramp allowed the building to effectively "rise" above the land around it. However, the subsidence undermined the safety of the ramps causing structural damage to the concrete and opening up small crevice-like cracks in its connective fabric. Their angle eventually violated city regulations for disabled-person access and in October 2006, the ramps were replaced with a composite design of stairs, disabled-access lift, and switchback ramps.

=== Architecture ===
The building was designed by the well-known architectural firm Munselle Brown Partnership Inc. of San Francisco (now Costa Brown Architecture), who were selected after winning an invited design competition, and Architects of Record DES Architects + Engineers, Inc. as a Class A office building. Peter Munselle of the Munselle Brown Partnership prepared the winning architectural design concept. Theodore Brown served as Partner in Charge for Munselle/Brown, and Bob Giannini was the principal architect for DES. The building was completed in 1986, commissioned by the Dakin Company, being constructed by the Koll company. It is entirely steel frame in construction, supported by driven piles up to 140 feet (43 m) deep into the bay mud. A dedicated trail for hikers is established to conform to the San Francisco Bay perimeter master trail plan; large boulders and rip-rap are placed below the trail to prevent wave action erosion. The landscape architect for the original design was Royston, Hanamoto, Alley and Abey of San Francisco.

The building itself is a five-story design plus a penthouse, with one subterranean parking level. The exterior features a skin that is an innovative all-porcelain panel design, giving the building a shimmering appearance in the sunlight or uplights by night; moreover, most of the fenestration was slanted approximately 45 degrees from vertical, designed to reduce glare and enhance energy conservation, but also lending a futuristic effect.

In 2014, Westport Capital, the owner of the site (including 5000 Marina and the Dakin Building at 7000 Marina), applied for a permit to redesign the Dakin, presenting their preliminary plans in April 2014. The remodeling of 5000 and 7000 Marina was handled by Design Blitz SF. At the time, both buildings had been vacant for more than four years. Design Permit DP-2-14 was approved by the City of Brisbane Planning Commission on August 7, 2014 by a vote of 3–1; it was intended to link the two buildings together with a cohesive design. Key elements of the redesign of the Dakin included removing the signature angled window/awning system, replacing them with vertical glass, and to square-off the glass entry at the building's southern corner. Two members of the Brisbane City Council filed an appeal of the approval two weeks later. According to the appeal, "[n]either the Planning Staff nor the Planning Commission demonstrated an awareness of the historical and architectural significance of what was originally known as the Dakin Building. The Brisbane City Council commissioned NicholsBooth Architects to review the proposed design, who concluded that "if we subscribe to the belief that form follows function, then we recommend changing this form to create the desired function" in recommending the proposed modification to the window/awning system be approved. It was also noted the existing window/awning system blocked views for most building occupants and were leaky. At a subsequent special public meeting, Theodore Brown, the original architect, shared his vision for the building and suggested alternatives to the proposed redesign, but the Council affirmed the Planning Commission's decision 3–2. The remodel was completed in 2016.

The gross floor area is approximately 119,000 square feet (11,100 m^{2}) plus 21,000 square feet (2,000 m^{2}) of underground parking and shipping /receiving rooms. Surface parking is provided for 266 vehicles. In 2018, Marina Boulevard Property (the corporate entity spun off from Westport Capital) applied to reduce the number of parking spots to 245 to upgrade the utility service to the building, required by the building's new role as a research & development center.

Due to its proximity to landfill, the Dakin relies on specially engineered recovery systems below its basements to actively capture fugitive methane off-gas and vent it away from the building.

=== Interior ===
The interior design features a soaring five-story entrance atrium capped by a massive skylight dome with a 40-foot-wide (12 m) laminated glass glazing panel, whose atrium footprint is almost 10,000 square feet (1,000 m^{2}). Other major interior elements are a state-of-the-art auditorium and a large computer room capable of supporting a national corporation data center, both built by C. Michael Hogan, the second owner.

At the Christmas season the building was historically topped with several illuminated stars approximately 70 square feet (7 m^{2}) each in area, emulating a Brisbane annual tradition of lighted stars on buildings.

=== Artworks ===
In the late 1980s the R. Dakin Company assembled a large collection of contemporary art from artists worldwide. The media included watercolor, oil painting, serigraph, lithograph, etching, collage, ceramic plate, sculpture and mixed media. These pieces were used to grace the interior of the Dakin Building, and were hung in literally all public areas, conference rooms, hallways and the atrium. The collection featured some well-known artists and some rising artists, who were not well established at that time. Some of the artists featured are Jeff Glenn, tapestry artist; Barbe; Marachal; Heiliger; Marlatt; Frings; Dudley and Garber. When C. Michael Hogan purchased the building in 1990, he hung some of his art collection to add to the museum character of the building, including a well-known suite of Roberto Matta. When Dakin left the building, Hogan purchased the bulk of the Dakin art collection.

The front exterior entrance to the Dakin building originally featured a large stone sculpture of a teddy bear, hewn from natural stone. This bear became the hallmark of the high-tech building embodying the playful spirit of the R. Dakin designers and the avant-garde character of the building. The bear is designed in the manner of Benny Bufano by sculptor Judith Lord. When Hogan sold the Dakin Building in 1995, he retained ownership rights to the bear.

In 2018, Sangamo presented plans to install a dichroic glass and stainless steel sculpture near the northern atrium. The sculpture, a sphere approximately 15 feet (4.6 m) in diameter, is entitled Eureka and was created by the artist Gordon Huether.

=== The Star Wars saga ===
Hitachi Building at 1000 Marina Blvd, located near to Dakin Building

The Dakin building has been nicknamed the 'Luke Skywalker' building, due to its bold appearance of bright white porcelain panels and futuristic design, seeming to embody the concept of good. To complete the metaphor, the nearby Hitachi Building is dubbed the 'Darth Vader' building, replete with its full reflective exterior of black smoke glass, emulating the impenetrable visage of the evil counterpart.

Selected locations in Sierra Point:
1. Dakin Building
2. Hitachi Building

The San Francisco Chronicle stated "Aesthetically [the Darth Vader building] is no match for Luke Skywalker's happy white palace just a few hundred feet away, which has been an instant popular success. The newly completed building is headquarters for the R. Dakin cuddly toy company." According to the Chronicle article, "The differences between the two buildings go far beyond ... architectural good versus evil. They show the choice between prepackaged architecture, in which individuals or even businesses are regarded as interchangeable, and a custom built home for a family controlled company that has been in the Bay Area for years."

Hitachi relocated from the dark glass building to a site on North First Street in San Jose in 2007. The property was acquired by Meridian Property Company from TA Associates in 2016 for $29 million and sold to Phase 3 Real Estate Partners in 2018 for $39.5 million.

== Awards ==
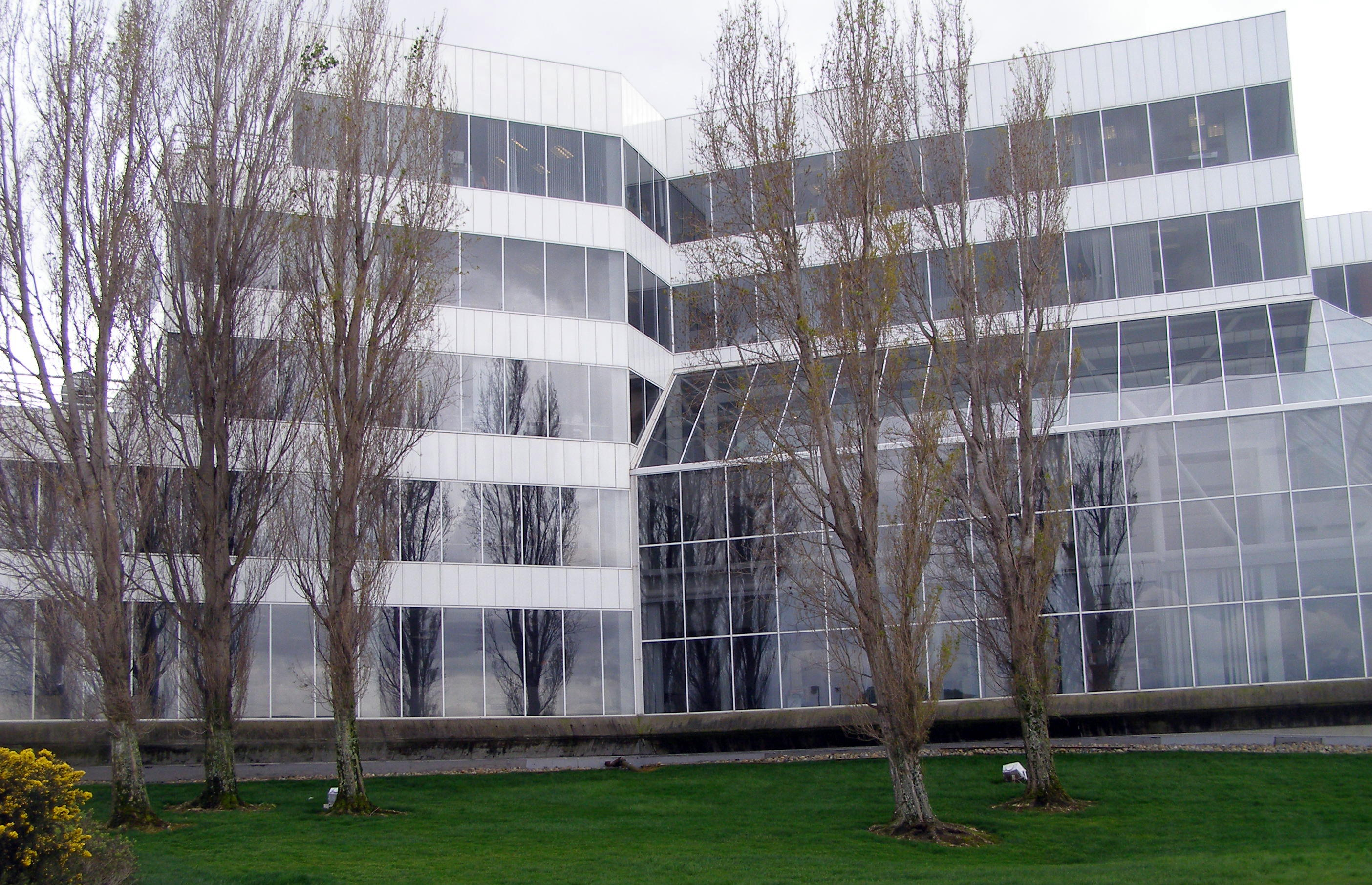
Northern facade of the Dakin Building, viewed from the San Francisco Bay Shoreline Trail. The large glass atrium is prominent on the right-hand side of the photograph.

The Dakin building has won a number of architectural awards including an American Institute of Architects Design Excellence Award in 1992. According to the San Francisco Examiner, the jury awarded this distinction to the Dakin building because "[i]ts chief strength is the atrium, with its views of the San Francisco Bay and asymmetrical skylight". The same article noted the building "houses executive offices, research and development facilities and product showrooms".

In international design competition the Dakin building was awarded semi-finalist standing in the 1990 Quaternario Award, an international award for innovative technology in architecture. The American Institute of Architects 1990 article states that one of the bases for the international recognition is: "The two north facing atrium walls are faced entirely in glass... Due to the expanse of glass, the projecting atrium gives the impression of a greenhouse, creating the effect of extending the interior to an adjacent park and to the bay beyond".

The Quaternario judges focused on the technological aspects of the fenestration design where window angles were calculated to minimize interior glare and reduce interior over-illumination, while at the same time reducing solar heat loading and subsequent demand for air conditioning as energy conservation techniques. The angled window projections effectively provide permanent sunscreens, obviating any need for interior blinds or shades.

== See also ==
- Fourth and Blanchard Building
- Efficient energy use
- Solar design
