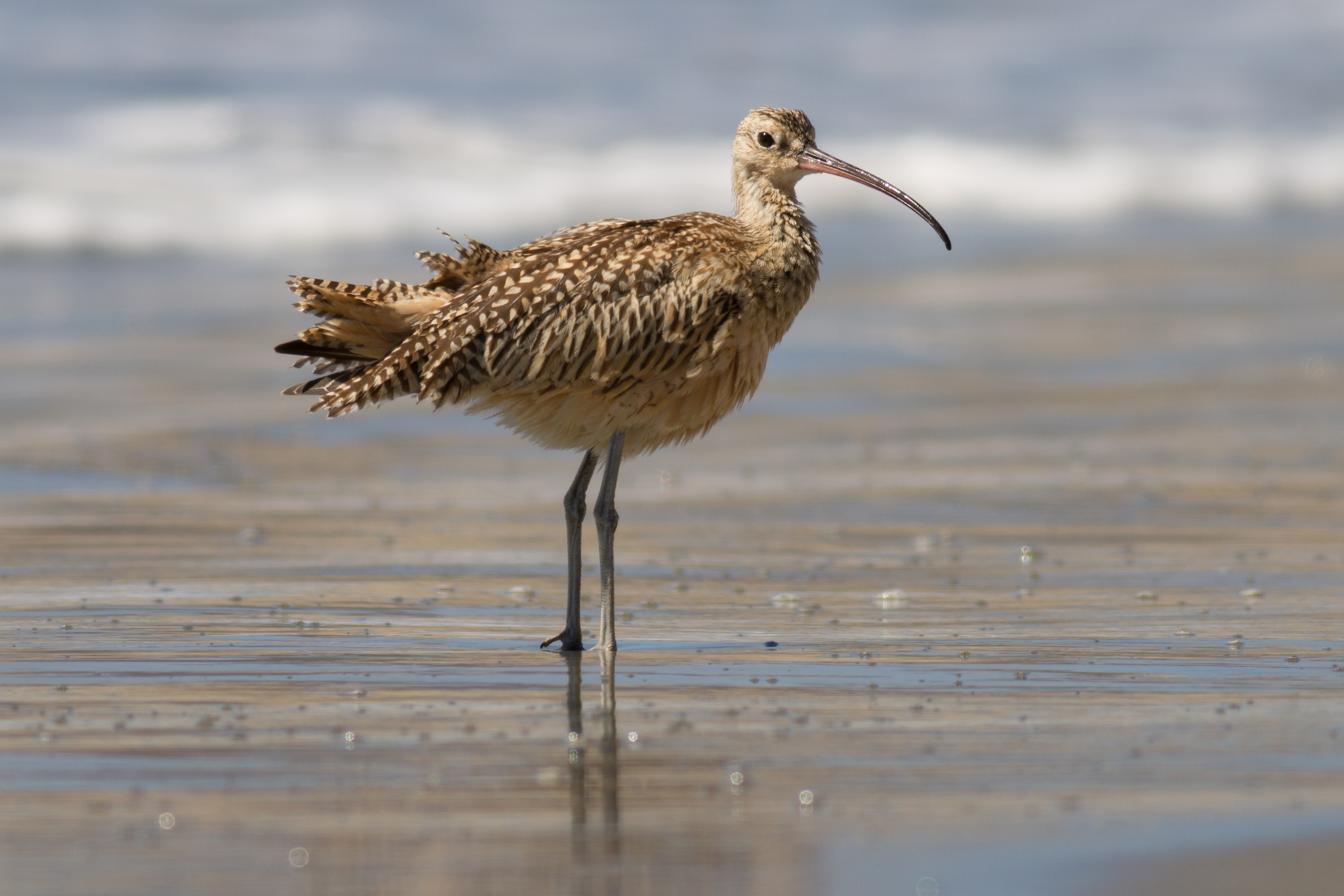
- Juvenile long-billed curlew in California

Conservation status
- Least Concern (IUCN 3.1)

Scientific classification
- Kingdom: Animalia
- Phylum: Chordata
- Class: Aves
- Order: Charadriiformes
- Family: Scolopacidae
- Genus: Numenius
- Species: N. americanus

Binomial name
- Numenius americanus Bechstein, 1812
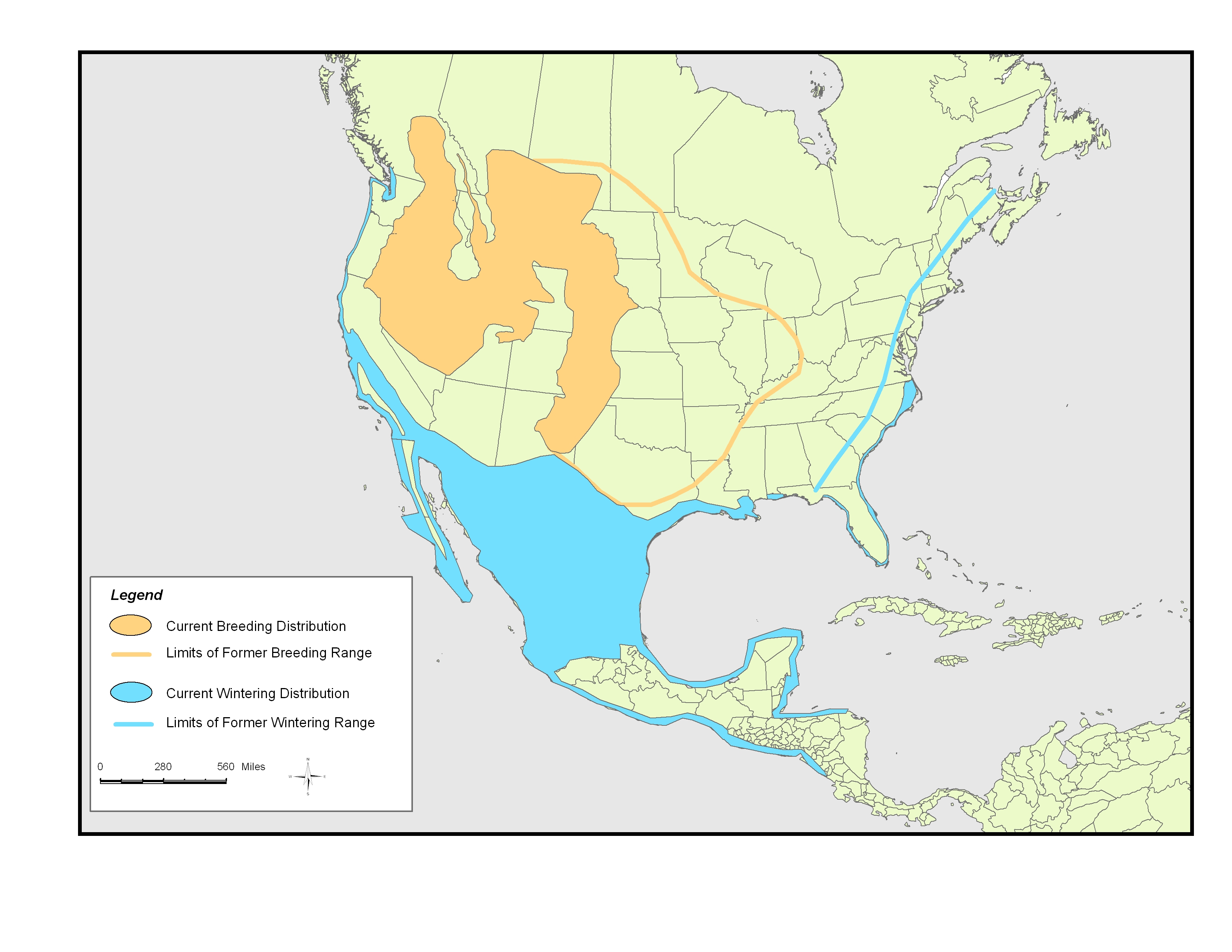
- Range of N. americanus

Synonyms
- Numenius longirostra(is)

= Long-billed curlew =

Species of bird

The long-billed curlew (Numenius americanus) is a large North American shorebird of the family Scolopacidae. This species was also called "sicklebird" and the "candlestick bird". The species breeds in central and western North America, migrating southward and coastward for the winter.

== Description ==
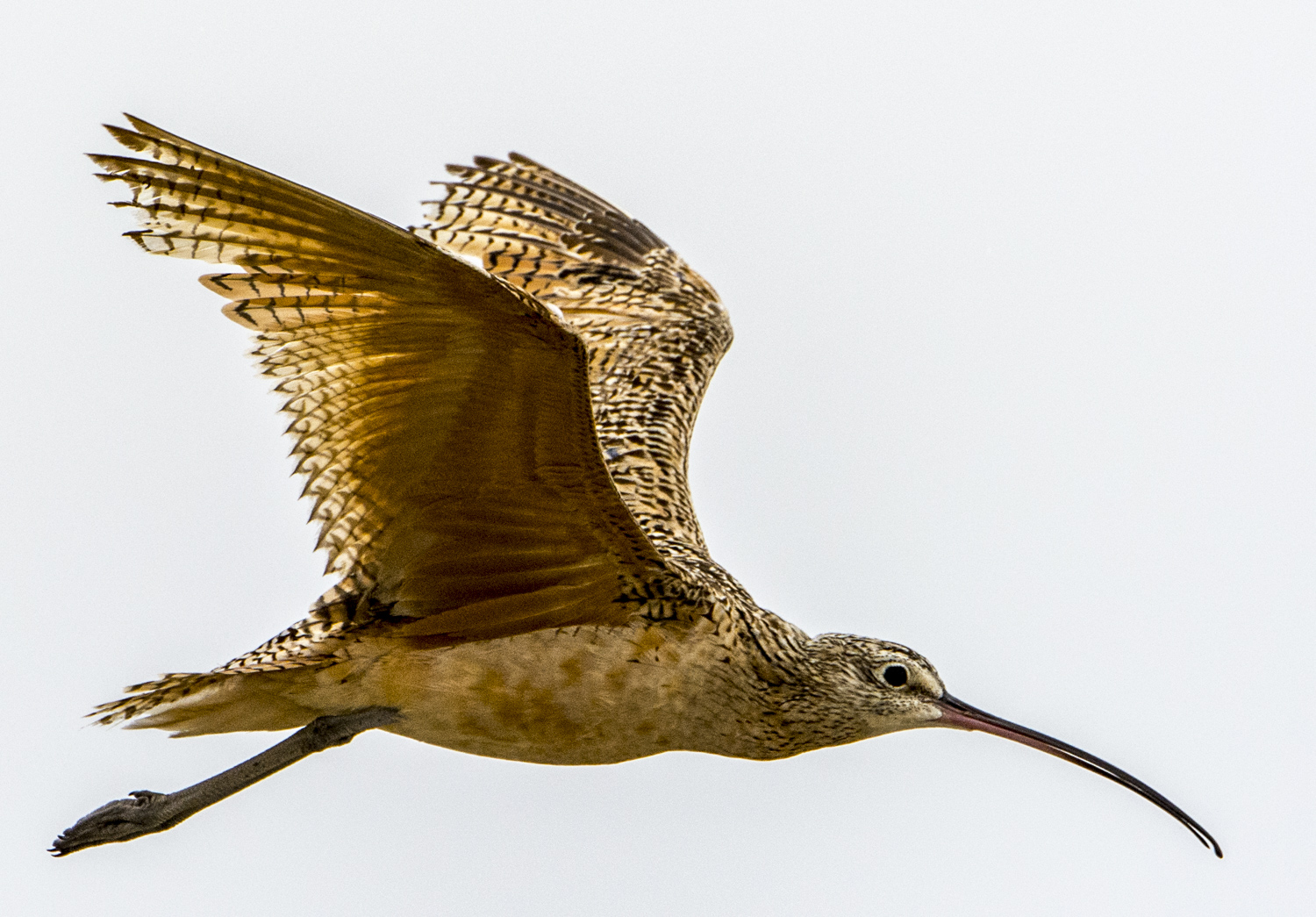
A male long-billed curlew in flight

The long-billed curlew is the largest sandpiper of regular occurrence in North America. It is 50–65 cm (20–26 in) long, 62–90 cm (24 1/2–35 1/2 in) across the wing and weighs 490–950 g (1 lb 1 1/2 oz – 2 lb 1 1/2 oz). Its disproportionally long bill curves downward and measures 11.3–21.9 cm (4 1/2–8 5/8 in), and rivals the bill of the larger-bodied Far Eastern curlew as the longest bill of any shorebird. Individuals have a long neck and a small head. The neck and underparts are a light cinnamon in color, while the crown is streaked with brown. This species exhibits reversed sexual dimorphism, as in many sandpipers, the female being larger and having a much longer bill than the male's.

== Breeding ==
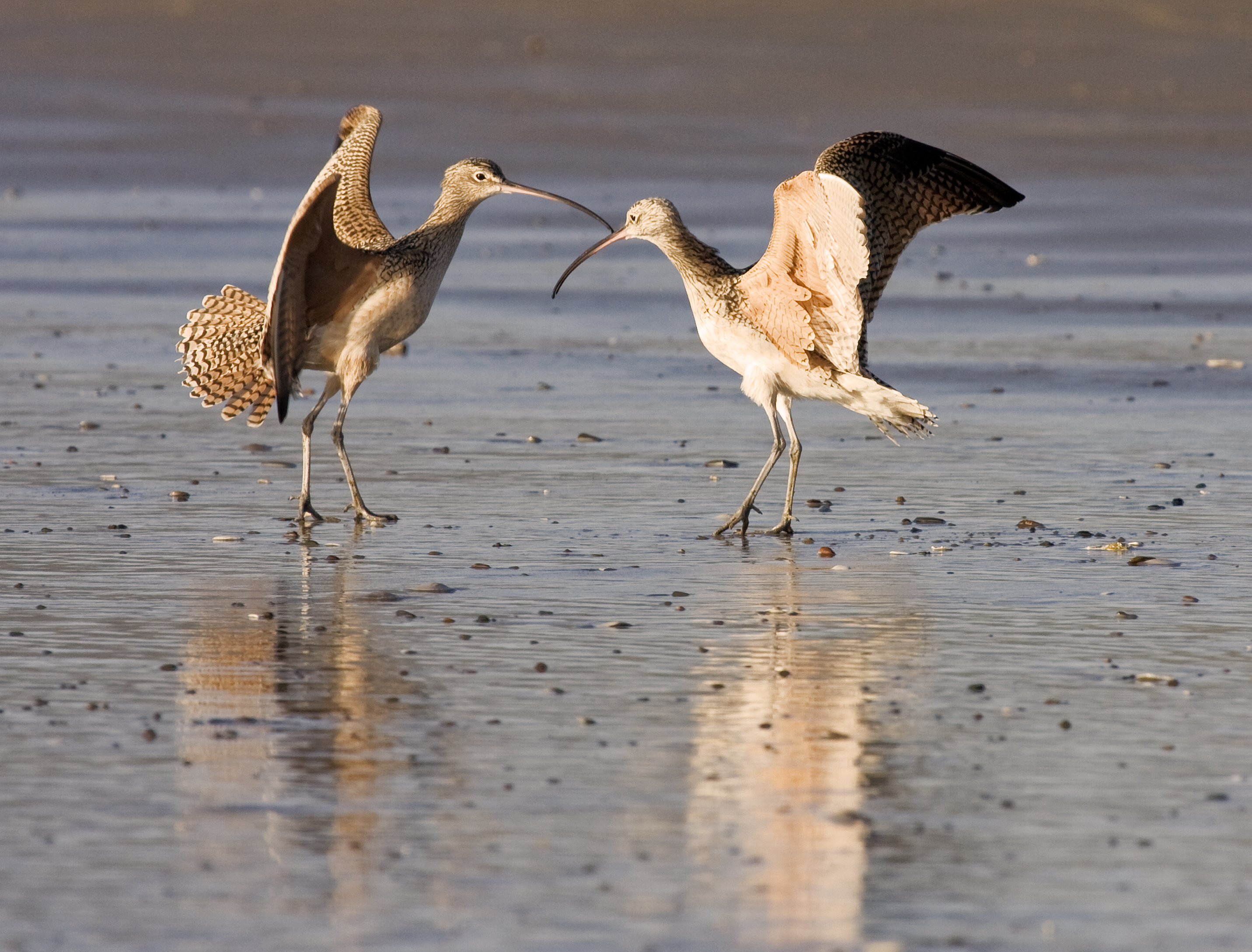
Long-billed curlews courting

The breeding habitat is grasslands in west-central North America. The species displays an elaborate courtship dance, with fast and looping display flights also being common. A small hollow is lined with various weeds and grasses to serve as the nest. The species is a determinant layer, a characteristic of shorebirds, laying four eggs, which vary in hue from white to olive. The young of the Long-billed curlew are precocial, the chicks leaving the nest soon after hatching. Though both parents look after the young, females usually abandon the brood to the male 1–3 weeks after hatching and depart for winter grounds. Adults whose nest fails often depart immediately (or nearly so) for winter grounds.

== Feeding ==
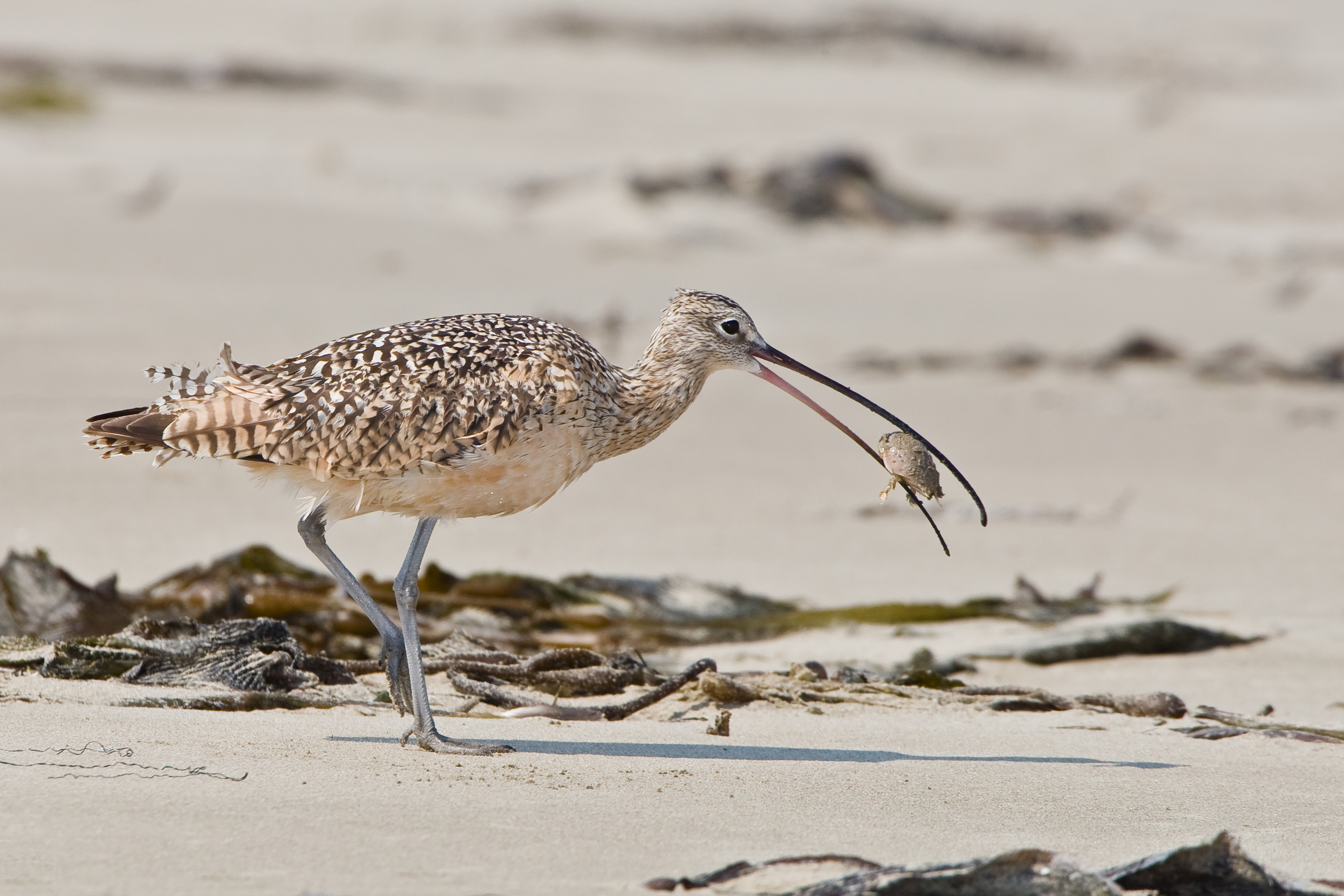
Eating a sand crab

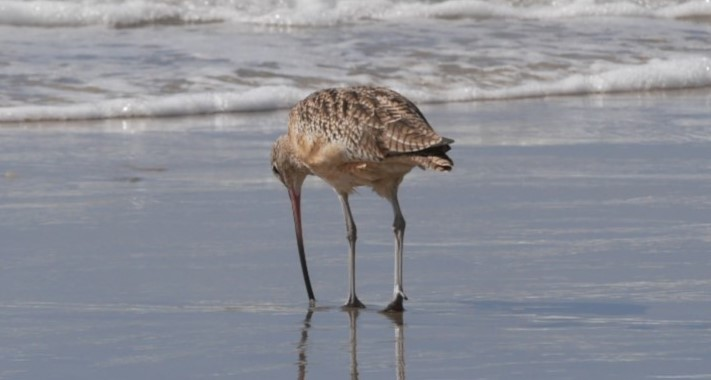
Foraging in the sand

Long-billed curlews often feed in flocks. Using the long bill, an individual probes the mud or other substrate for suitable food. The usual food consists of crabs and various other small invertebrates. The species also feeds on grasshoppers, beetles, and other insects. This bird has been known to occasionally eat the eggs of other birds.

== Conservation status ==
The population was significantly reduced at the end of the 19th century by hunting, though numbers have rebounded somewhat in more-recent times. The species was formerly classified as Near Threatened by the IUCN, but new research has confirmed that the long-billed curlew is again common and widespread. Consequently, it has been downlisted to Least Concern status in 2008.

Candlestick Point in San Francisco was named after this indigenous bird, and subsequently Candlestick Park stadium inherited the name. The species had dramatically declined in the San Francisco area by the early 20th century already, being "practically extinct" in San Mateo County in 1916. By the time the stadium was constructed in the 1950s, there was no remnant of the huge, local flocks of "candlestick birds" left.

The long-billed curlew was also formerly a plentiful wintering bird on the East Coast of the United States, and John James Audubon's painting of the species was in fact of individuals he sighted near Charleston, South Carolina. However, market hunting and breeding habitat loss nearly wiped out this population, and presently only a small "ghost" or relict population of less than a hundred birds still winters on the East Coast, and this population has yet to recover. It is possible that this wintering population may have consisted largely of now-extirpated birds that bred on the eastern Great Plains, and the disappearance of those birds may tie in to the near disappearance of the Atlantic wintering population, with the present Atlantic wintering population being the descendants of the last survivors of the eastern Great Plains breeders. In December 2015, one such "ghost bird" was successfully captured off the coast of Georgia and fitted with a satellite tag with plans to analyze its migration routes, with it taking flight in April 2016.
