= Blue Heron Lake Boathouse =

Recreational facility in San Francisco

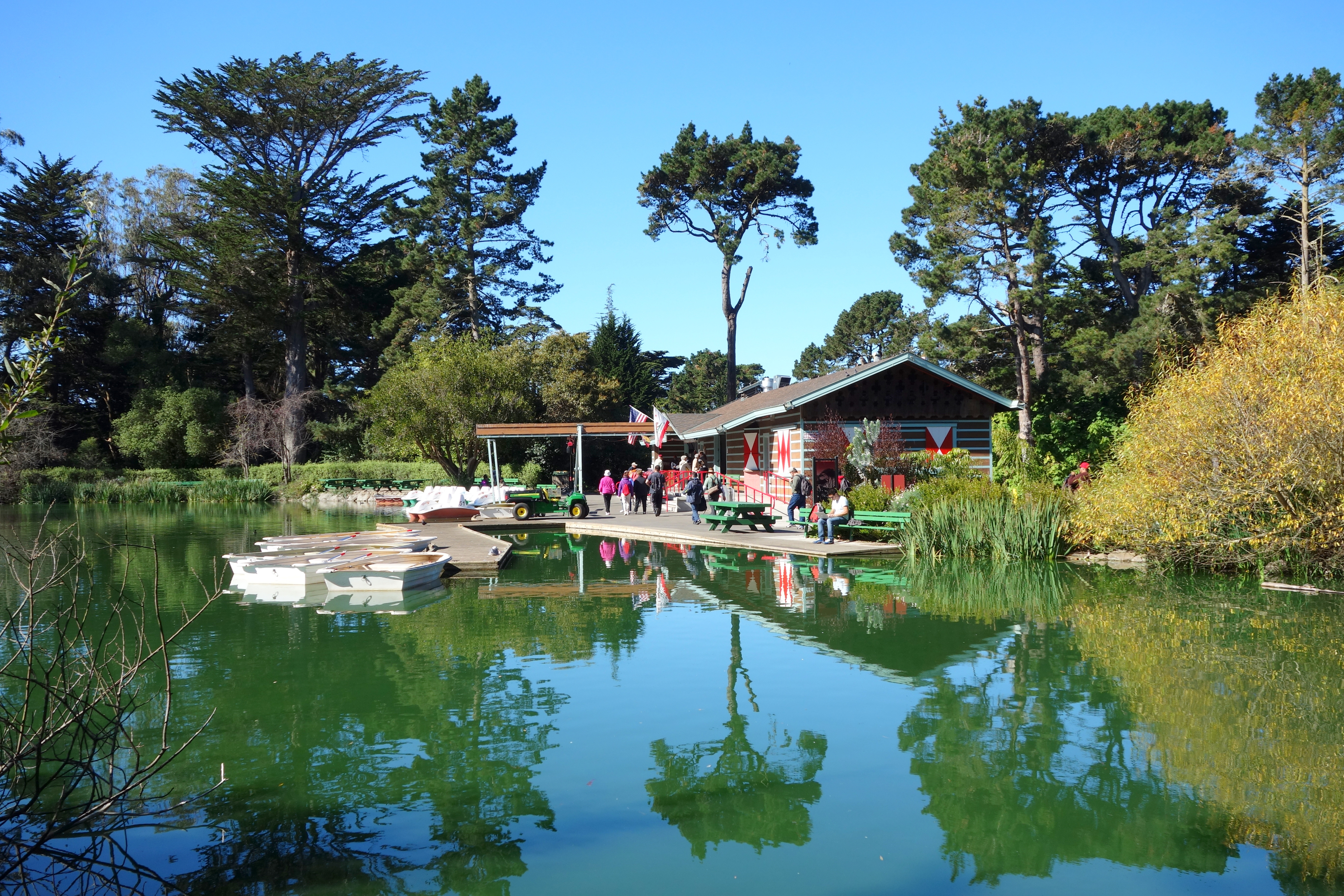
- Blue Heron Lake Boathouse (formerly known as Stow Lake Boathouse), replacement for original boathouse built in 1893.

Origin
- Coordinates: 37.7706°N 122.4771°W
- Operator: San Francisco Recreation & Parks Department
- Year built: 1946-1949

Information
- Purpose: Recreation & Boating

The Blue Heron Lake Boathouse, formerly known as the Stow Lake Boathouse, is a recreational facility in San Francisco.

== Location ==
The boathouse is located at Blue Heron Lake (formerly known as Stow Lake), which is on the easternmost side of Golden Gate Park. Frederick Law Olmsted laid the groundwork for the creation of Golden Gate Park in what was the Outside Lands in the western end of San Francisco. The park was built from east to west, with Strawberry Hill and Blue Heron Lake being among some of the first constructions.

== History and architecture ==
The original Strawberry Lake Boathouse was built in 1893 in preparation for the California Midwinter International Exposition of 1894 held in Golden Gate Park. The original rustic style boathouse was designed by Arthur Page Brown, an American architect who is best known for his design of the San Francisco Ferry Building. The first boathouse was much larger than the structure there today and had a gabled window above the roof and a wrap-around porch. After a fire destroyed the building in 1937, it was rebuilt in 1946 – 1949 from designs by architect Warren C. Perry who gave it an alpine chalet style look meant to integrate with the surrounding natural landscape. This was a style that was growing in popularity in San Francisco during the 1920s. The new boathouse was constructed by builders Wellnitz and DeNarde, who also did the rehabilitation of the Murphy Windmill in 1948. The new Stow Lake Boathouse was the first building constructed in Golden Gate Park after the end of World War II. The delay in construction was most likely caused by the depressed economy leftover from the 1930s and the start of World War II.

In 2024, Stow Lake Boathouse, alongside Stow Lake and Stow Lake Drive, were officially renamed to remove mention of their namesake, former Speaker of the California State Assembly William W. Stow, due to his anti-Semitic views. The new name, "Blue Heron Lake," references the indigenous birds often found nesting by the lake.

== Tenants and Operations ==
Blue Heron Lake Boathouse is owned by the San Francisco Recreation and Parks Department, who governs all San Francisco public parks. The boathouse has been offering boat rentals since it was constructed in 1893 when it was known as the Strawberry Lake Boathouse. It is unknown who ran the operation until Calvin V. Tilden first leased the property in 1943. In 1971, his son, Calvin B. Tilden, took over and it remained in the family until 2011 when San Francisco Recreation and Parks Department evicted them. There was a protest and controversy over the change in tenants that was led by Suzanne Renee Dumont, who created the Save Stow Lake Boathouse Coalition and authored the 2010 Historic Landmark Nomination for the Stow Lake Boathouse (Tim Frye link below). The concern was that if a corporation took over the operation they would remodel it and destroy the old-fashioned character of the boathouse. Dumont and the Save the Stow Lake Boathouse Coalition strongly influenced the city to maintain the historic character of the boathouse, when they proposed removing any trace of the original boathouse. In February 2011 the Board of Supervisors approved the lease to Ortega Family Enterprises, which operates a number of concessions in national parks. Ortega received assistance from lobbyist, Alex Tourk, who helped them campaign to get the lease. Ortega did remodel the building, adding a small indoor café, repainting the exterior, preserving the original look with guidance from the Historic Landmark Commission who realized the treasure the boathouse is.

== Landmarking ==
In 2011, the Historic Preservation Commission determined that the boathouse was eligible as a landmark but put the decision on hold for consideration until 2012, when they decided to consider the boathouse as part of Golden Gate Park landmarking.
