= Sierra Point (Yosemite) =

Point in Yosemite National Park at the eastern end of the valley

Coordinates: 37.727286°N 119.554494°W

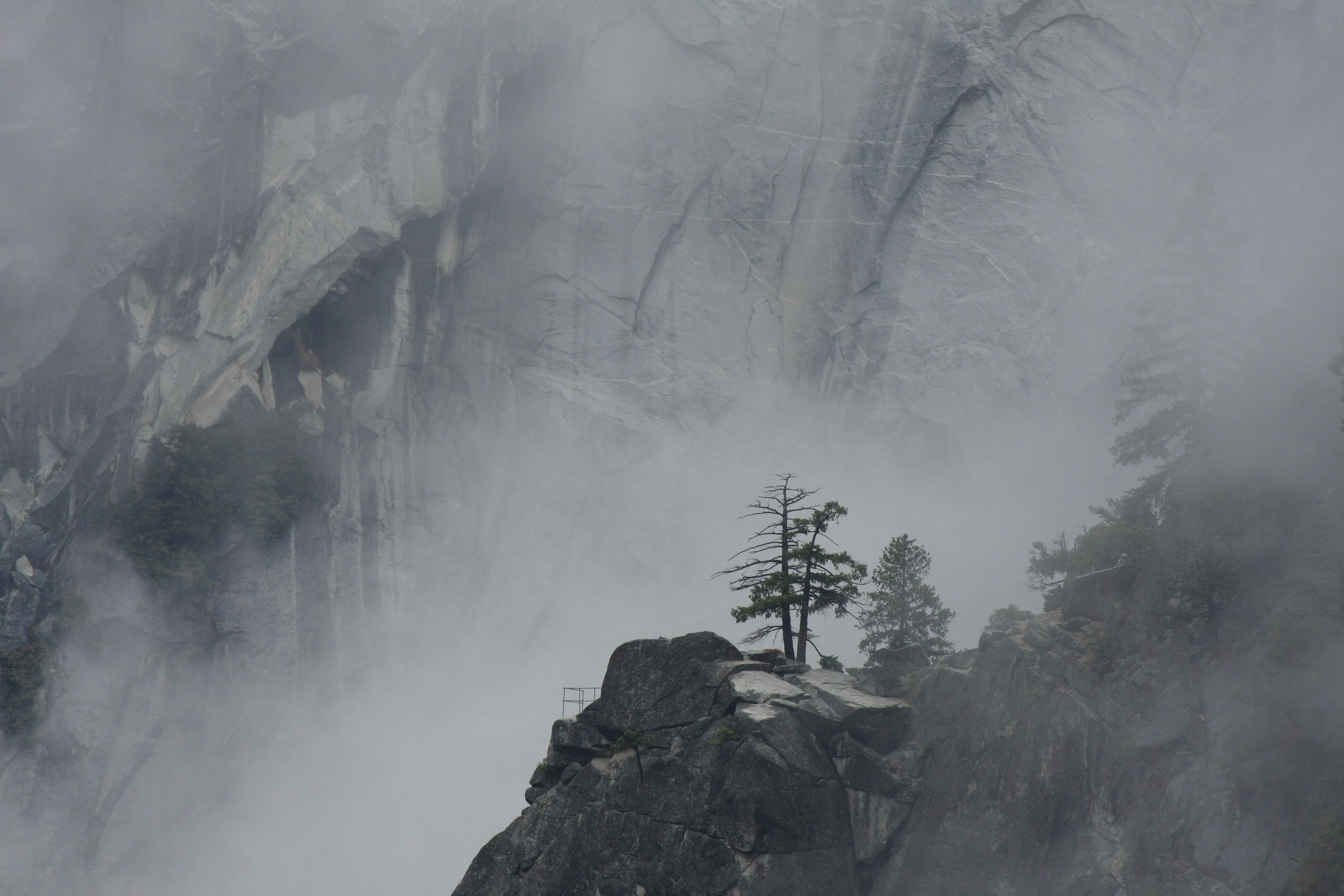
Sierra Point seen from the top of Vernal Fall

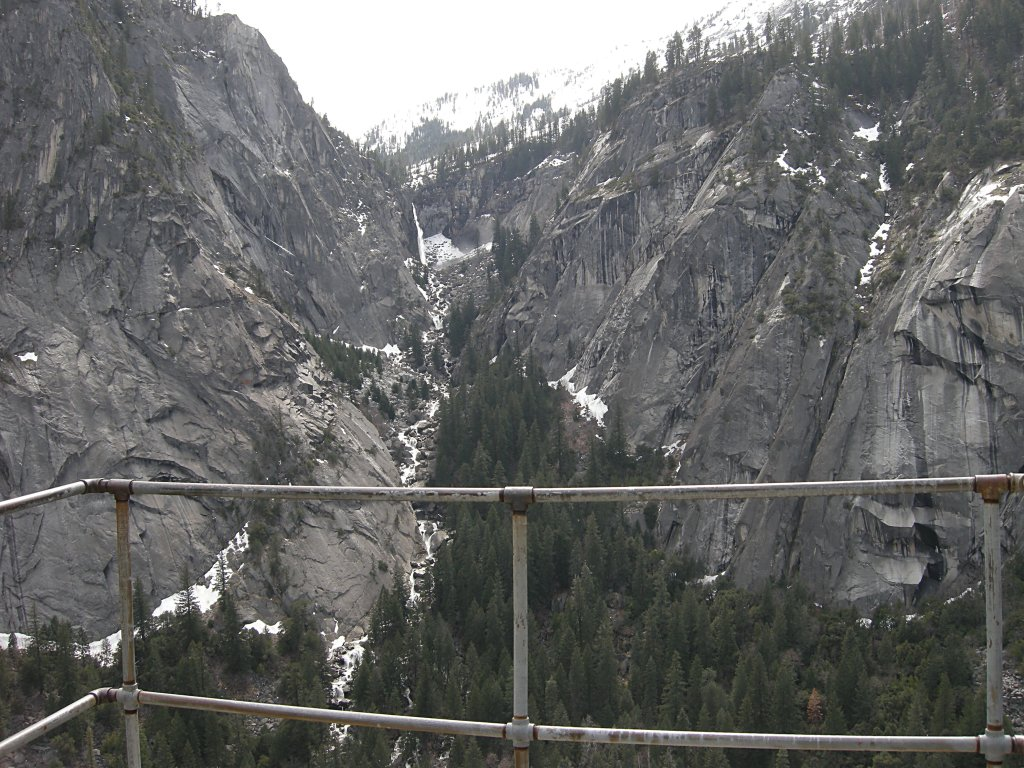
Illilouette Fall and Gorge from Sierra Point

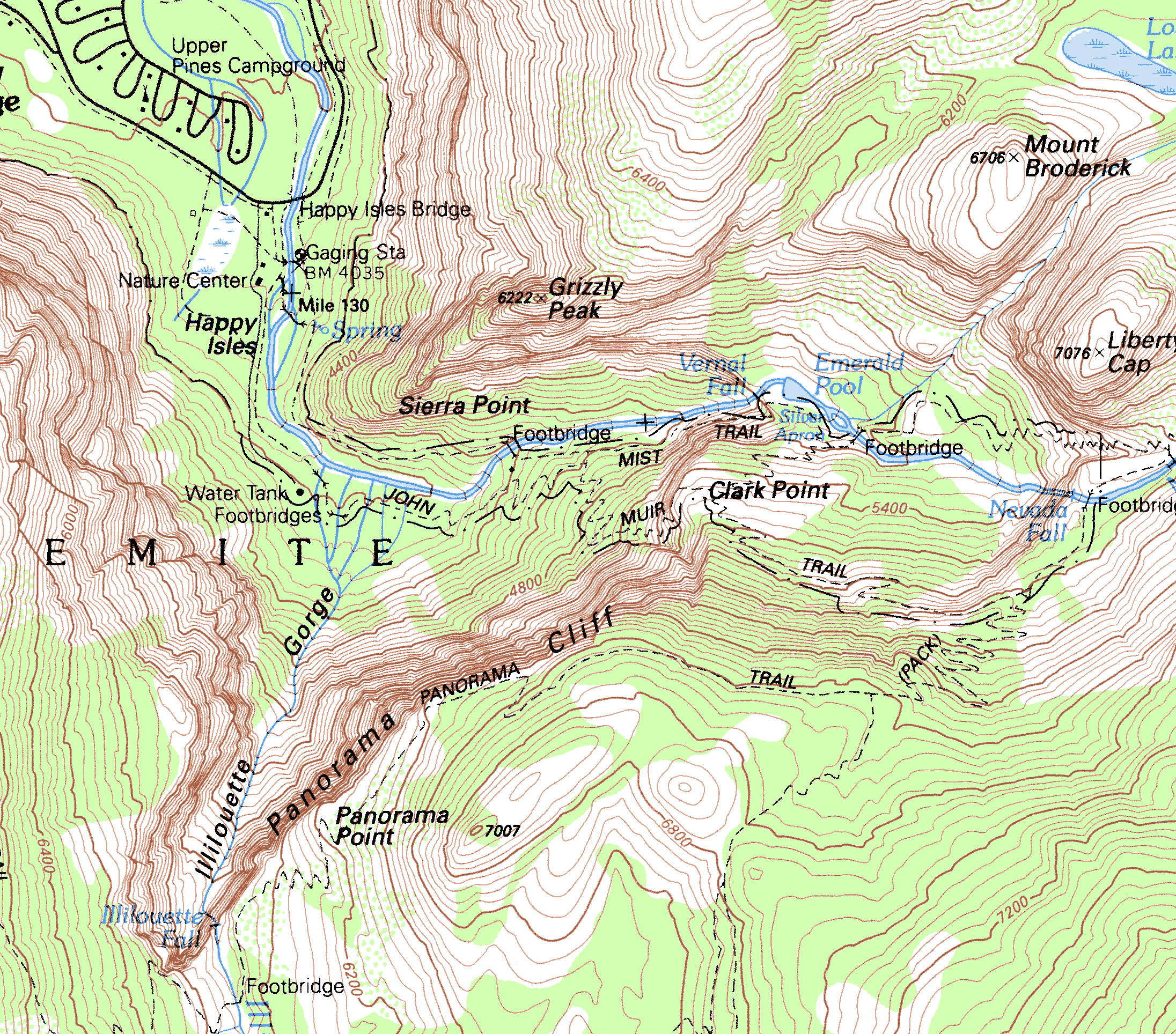
Map showing Sierra Point and the Mist Trail

Sierra Point is an elevated viewpoint on a rocky outcropping of Yosemite National Park, at the eastern end of the valley, below Grizzly Peak, which was accessible through a now-closed trail.

== History ==
The trail used to be quite popular, but was closed after a rock slide in the 1970s. It is popular in part because it is the only point in the valley from which four major waterfalls can be seen from one vantage point: Vernal Fall, Nevada Fall, Yosemite Falls, and Illilouette Fall.

Following the rock slide, a portion of the trail approximately mid-way to Sierra Point is missing, although it is still possible to reach the point by scrambling over loose ground. Although the trail is only 0.7 miles (1.1 km) long and about 1,000 feet (300 m) off the valley floor, this hike should not be attempted by beginning hikers due to the difficulty of the missing portions of the trail. In fact, the National Park Service does not recommend that anyone take this trail. Despite this warning, many people still reach the point each year as it is easily accessible from the Vernal Fall trail in Happy Isles, and still has the original railing at the top.
