= Sierra Point (Brisbane) =

Small artificial peninsula on San Francisco Bay

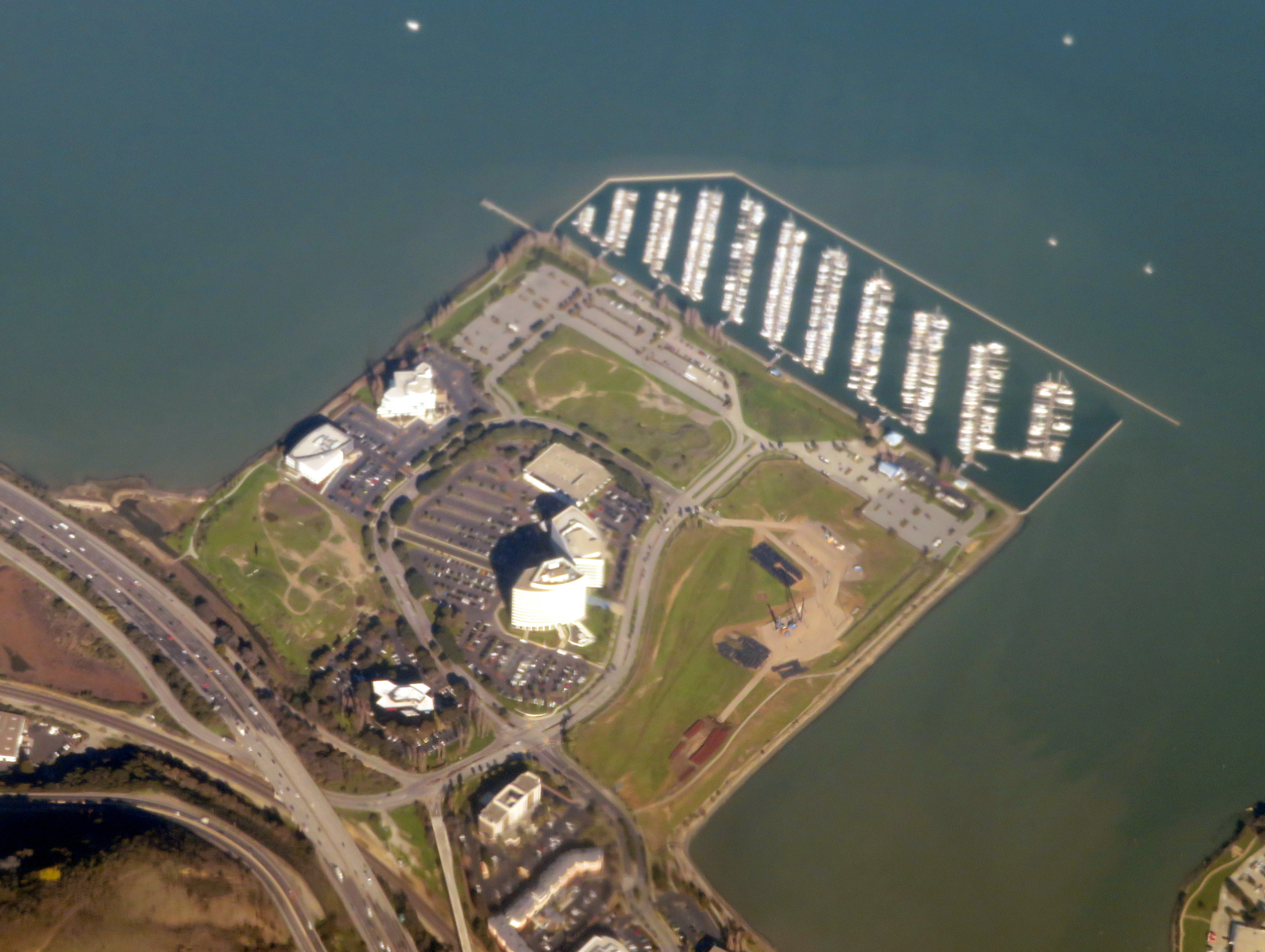
Aerial view of Sierra Point in 2018, facing approximately northeast.

Sierra Point is a small artificial peninsula that extends eastward into the San Francisco Bay from the eastern shore of the San Francisco Peninsula, located in Brisbane, San Mateo County, California (although the south part of the business park extends into South San Francisco). It lies entirely east of U.S. Route 101. There are several class A office buildings at Sierra Point including the Dakin Building and the former Hitachi building. The Brisbane Marina is on the eastern shore of Sierra Point. The San Francisco Bay Trail runs along the waterfront of the peninsula and continues south into the Oyster Point area of South San Francisco.

== History and characteristics ==
Sierra Point encompasses an area of 132 acres (53 ha), reclaimed from San Francisco Bay by landfill behind dikes. 102 acres (41 ha) are for the office park and 30 acres (12 ha) are for the Brisbane Marina. It is one of two large commercial districts in Brisbane; the older Crocker Industrial Park north of the residential area of Brisbane was developed during the 1960s.

The Sunset Scavenger Company let a contract to the Easley and Brassy Company, who constructed an earthen dike from 1965 to 1967 around the existing site perimeter, on the existing mud flat east of San Bruno Mountain. The area, then named the Sierra Point Solid Waste Disposal Site, was used as an unlined Class III landfill between 1965 and 1972, covered daily with soil taken from Candlestick Point. In total, 80 acres (32 ha) were used for the disposal of an estimated 1,900,000 to 2,600,000 cubic yards (1,500,000 to 2,000,000 m^{3}) of solid waste.

The entire site was purchased by Sierra Point Development Company (SPDC) from Sunset Scavenger in 1975. SPDC donated approximately 20 acres (8.1 ha) for a municipal marina to the City of Brisbane in 1980, in partial exchange for development rights to the site. After it was complete, the city would assume control of the marina and collect property taxes on the improved site. Development of the Sierra Point area was approved in 1979 and started in 1982. The San Francisco Regional Water Quality Control Board adopted Order 82-27 in June 1982 to provide landfill closure requirements; that was subsequently rescinded and superseded by Order 96-058 in 1996. SPDC subsequently sold the site to Sierra Point Associates Two (SPA2) in November 1983.

By 1996, 70 acres (28 ha) of the landfill site had been capped with a minimum of 3 feet (0.91 m) of clean soil and 1 foot (0.30 m) of compacted clay. In 2001, the elevation of Sierra Point was 15 feet (4.6 m) above sea level, with settlement expected to reduce the elevation to 12 feet (3.7 m) over the next 100 years.

== Development ==
Selected locations in Sierra Point:
1 7000 Marina Blvd (Dakin Building)
2 5000 Marina Blvd
3 3000–3500 Marina Blvd (under construction)
4 1000 Marina Blvd (former Hitachi Building)
5 2000 Sierra Point Pkwy
6 8000 Marina Blvd
7 9000 Marina Blvd (undeveloped)
8 5000 Sierra Point Pkwy (hotel)
9 2000 Shoreline Ct (hotel)
10 Future biotech campus
11 Future Sierra Point Plaza
12 4000 Shoreline Ct
13 5000 Shoreline Ct
14 6000 Shoreline Ct
15 7000 Shoreline Ct

As of 2008, Sierra Point has not been completely built out. Existing buildings include two office buildings north of the Marina loop (7000 Marina 1 and 5000 Marina 2 ), the oldest building at Sierra Point, an office building covered in dark glass just east of 101 and west of Marina (1000 Marina Blvd 4 ), two office buildings in the loop enclosed by Marina and Sierra Point (2000 Sierra Point Pkwy 5 and 8000 Marina Blvd 6 ), and two hotels in the southwest corner (near the western intersection of Marina and Sierra Point, 8 and 9 ). The parcel north of the oldest building is known as Parcel 3 3 [to become 3000–3500 Marina Blvd (under construction as of October 2022)], the area northeast of the eastern intersection of Marina and Sierra Point is zoned for another hotel 7 , the parcel south of Sierra Point Pkwy has been approved for the Sierra Point Biotech Project 10 , and the area east of the terminus of Sierra Point Pkwy is zoned for retail use and the planned Sierra Point Plaza 11 .

There are buildings at 4000, 5000, 6000, and 7000 Shoreline Court ( 12 – 15 ) in the southern portion of Sierra Point which lies within the City of South San Francisco.

=== Brisbane Marina ===
The Brisbane Marina was completed in 1983 along the eastern shore of Sierra Point and has slips for up to 580 boats. The Marina was built by a private developer at the city's expense in exchange for a long-term lease for the entire Sierra Point site; in addition, the developer would subsidize the loan payments for the money the city had borrowed to build the Marina.

The Sierra Point Yacht Club was established in 1984 to support boaters and boating activities at Brisbane Marina; initial meetings were held at local restaurants, and the first Club building was a maintenance building rented from the City of Brisbane starting from 1988. The Club moved into its present site at 500 Sierra Point Parkway, near the southeast corner of Sierra Point, in 2000.

=== 7000 Marina 1 and 5000 Marina 2 ===
This area, north of Marina Boulevard, was originally designated Parcel 4 and is 8.00 acres (3.24 ha). The Dakin Building was the first building to be developed at this site, at 7000 Marina.

=== 3000–3500 Marina 3 ===
The northwest corner of Sierra Point is also known as Parcel 3, which occupies approximately 8.867 acres (3.588 ha). The City of Brisbane approved the development of the Opus Office Center on Parcel 3 in 2009, which would include two office buildings and a five-story parking structure. In 2012, the City of Brisbane adopted development agreement DA-1-11; the project was largely unchanged except the development rights were extended to June 2022 and the buildings were required to be certified LEED Gold. An addendum was adopted in 2017 to further extend the development rights to 2027 in exchange for reverting control of Parcel R to the City of Brisbane.

Proposed buildings at Opus Office
Bldg	Levels	Total area	Footprint
1 (3500)	8	195,500 sq ft 18,160 m^{2}	?
2 (3000)	10	250,000 sq ft 23,000 m^{2}	?
Garage	5	377,515 sq ft 35,072.3 m^{2}	?

In 2018, the site was transferred to Phase 3 Real Estate Partners, who have proposed a biotech campus tentatively named Genesis Marina with approximately the same area in three buildings. The Planning Commission approved Design Permit DP-1-18 to modify the site plans in accordance with the Phase 3 design in November 2018.

Proposed buildings at Genesis Marina
Bldg	Levels	Total area	Footprint
1	5+2 (Note: Constructed above a 2-story parking podium)	138,115 sq ft 12,831.3 m^{2}	?
2	5+2	139,316 sq ft 12,942.9 m^{2}	?
3	6+2	133,046 sq ft 12,360.4 m^{2}	?
Parking	2	257,677 sq ft 23,939.0 m^{2} (Note: Excludes 35,922 square feet (3,337.3 m^{2}) of mechanical & storage space and 12,075 square feet (1,121.8 m^{2}) fitness center.)	?

=== 1000 Marina 4 ===
The 1000 Marina site consists of a parcel that is 4.516 acres (1.828 ha). The dark glass building at this site was built for Unisys. The 100,000 sq ft (9,300 m^{2}) building was sold to Spieker Properties for $10 million in 1997.

=== 2000 Sierra Point 5 & 8000 Marina 6 ===
This site, enclosed by the loop formed by Marina Boulevard and Sierra Point Parkway, consists of two parcels: Parcel 8 (western half), 10.199 acres (4.127 ha) and Parcel 9 (eastern half), 5.662 acres (2.291 ha). Parcel 8 was the first to be developed with Hitachi America's west coast headquarters.

=== Hotels 7 8 9 ===
Two hotels occupy Parcel 1, which is 6.849 acres (2.772 ha) in the southwest corner of Sierra Point. The undeveloped parcel in the northeast corner of Sierra Point is designated for a luxury/convention hotel and occupies 6.126 acres (2.479 ha).

=== Biotech Project 10 ===
The Sierra Point Biotech Project 10 consists of five buildings and one parking garage south of Sierra Point Parkway and east of Shoreline Court. The Biotech Project encompasses three separate parcels on the Sierra Point site, consisting of (from west to east) Parcel 7, 7.975 acres (3.227 ha); Parcel 6, 9.088 acres (3.678 ha); and Parcel 5, 5.793 acres (2.344 ha).

Proposed buildings at Biotech Project (Note: Listed in order from west to east)
Bldg	Levels	Total area	Footprint
A	3	90,005 sq ft 8,361.7 m^{2}	29,947 sq ft 2,782.2 m^{2}
B	4	120,225 sq ft 11,169.3 m^{2}	30,436 sq ft 2,827.6 m^{2}
C	4+1 (Note: +1 level for 136 sub-surface parking spaces)	120,225 sq ft 11,169.3 m^{2}	30,436 sq ft 2,827.6 m^{2}
D	3	90,078 sq ft 8,368.5 m^{2}	30,026 sq ft 2,789.5 m^{2}
E	4	119,652 sq ft 11,116.0 m^{2}	29,772 sq ft 2,765.9 m^{2}
Garage	5+1 (Note: 1 floor below grade, 4 floors above grade, and space on rooftop for 1,249 parking spaces)	337,587 sq ft 31,362.9 m^{2}	58,671 sq ft 5,450.7 m^{2}

Notes

It is anticipated there would be space for 1,800 employees at the Biotech Project campus. The project would also provide 2,500 square feet (230 m^{2}) of retail space on the first floor of the parking garage.

=== Sierra Point Plaza 11 ===
Parcel R is a 3.4-acre (1.4 ha) lot at the eastern terminus of Sierra Point Parkway, with an address of 400 Sierra Point Pkwy. It is owned by the City of Brisbane, but was leased in 1984 to a private developer to build up to 50,000 square feet (4,600 m^{2}) of commercial space. After the lease was signed, 12,500 square feet (1,160 m^{2}) were re-allocated to the Biotech Project site, reducing the developable area to 37,500 square feet (3,480 m^{2}). As of 2016, the site has not been developed beyond partial paving for a surface parking lot and a public park.

Under the 2016 Development Agreement DA-1-16, the lease for Parcel R was terminated and control of the site was returned to Brisbane; further development of Parcel R was frozen until the city decides what to do with the site.

=== 4000–7000 Shoreline 12 13 14 15 ===
Parcel 10 lies south of the hotels in Parcel 1, entirely in the City of South San Francisco, and occupies 26.78 acres (10.84 ha).

== Transportation ==
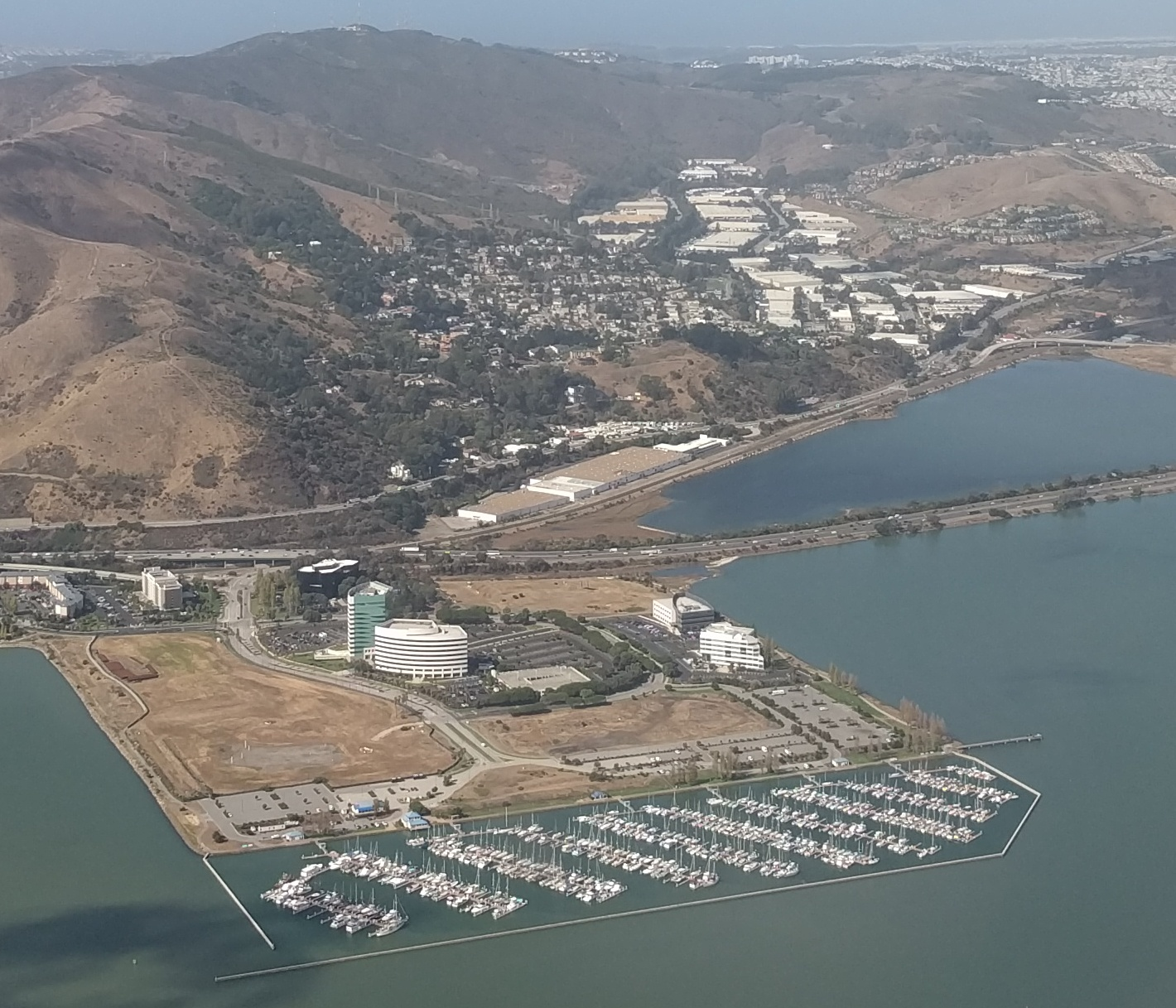
Aerial view of Sierra Point, looking west-northwest towards San Bruno Mountain in 2016. Bayshore Freeway runs north-south through the middle of the photograph.

Exits along the San Francisco Peninsula's principal highway, U.S. Highway 101 (the Bayshore Freeway), lead to Sierra Point Parkway. Sierra Point Parkway runs approximately east-west for its length east of 101, and crosses under the freeway and runs north-south along the west side of 101 and east of Brisbane Lagoon. The southbound exit from 101 leads to the northernmost end of Sierra Point Parkway, where it intersects with Lagoon Road. The northbound exit from 101 is near where Sierra Point Parkway crosses under the freeway. Sierra Point is connected to the rest of Brisbane via the northern end of Sierra Point Parkway.

Marina Boulevard is the other primary road in Sierra Point; it forms a loop north of Sierra Point Parkway. South of the Parkway from its western intersection, it becomes Shoreline Court.

Although the Caltrain Bayshore Cutoff line runs along the west side of Sierra Point, there are no stops. The nearest stops are Bayshore to the north and South San Francisco to the south; the former Butler Road stop at Oyster Point just to the south of Sierra Point was removed in 1983.

== Businesses ==
- Aimmune Therapeutics
- Ideaya Biosciences
- Myovant Sciences
- Sangamo Therapeutics
- Ultragenyx
- Kezar Life Sciences
- Tizona Therapeutics
- Nkarta

=== Former ===
- Hitachi America
- Sing Tao Daily
- Walmart eCommerce
