= List of AC Transit routes =

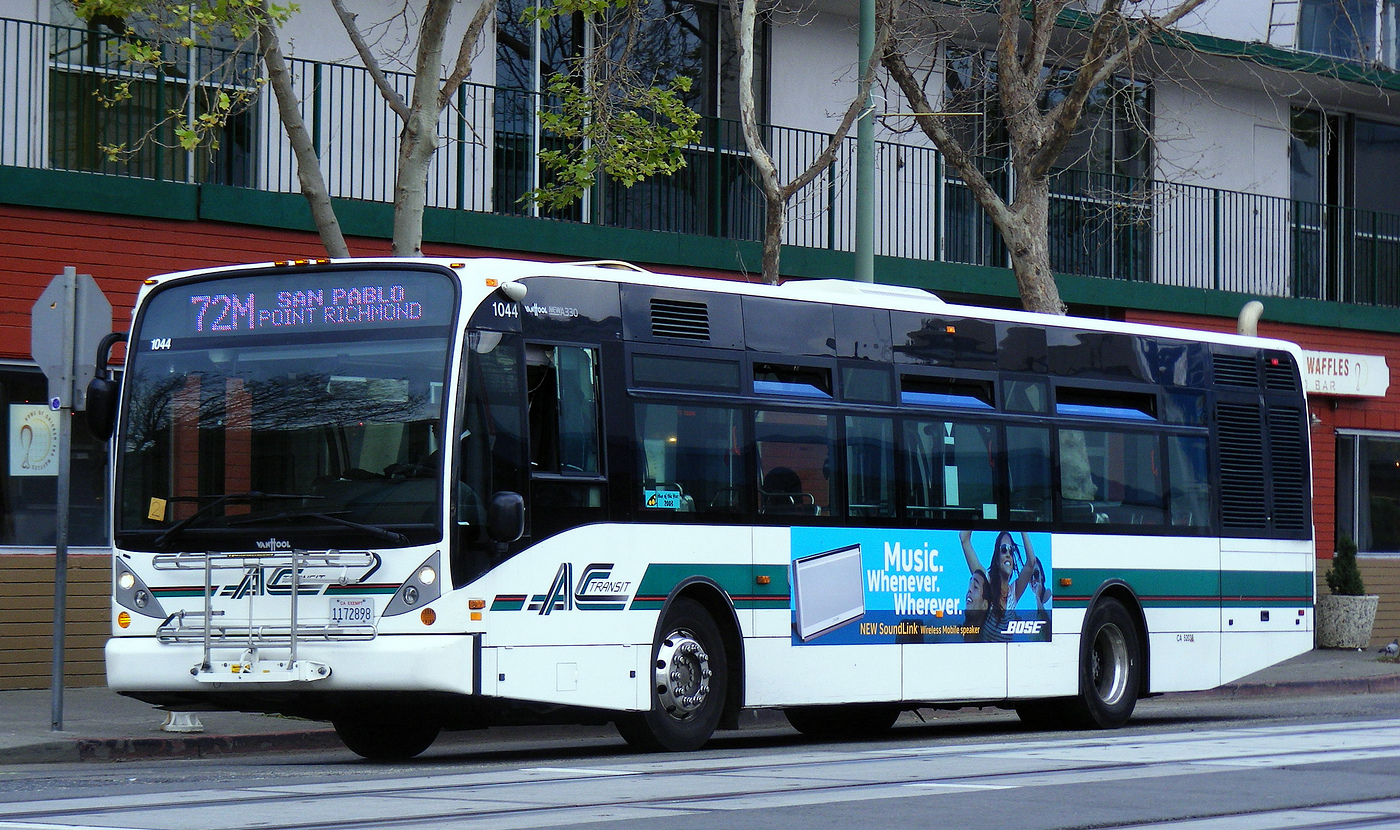
A Van Hool bus on Route 72M in Jack London Square, Oakland.

AC Transit is a public transit agency that operates 123 bus lines throughout the East Bay region of California. The agency also administers the Dumbarton Express lines, but operation of those lines was transferred to MV Transportation on December 19, 2011. AC Transit provides extensive local bus service to 17 cities in Alameda and Contra Costa counties and the city of Milpitas in Santa Clara County. Transbay bus service is also provided to San Francisco in San Francisco County and Palo Alto in Santa Clara County.

== Route summary ==
AC Transit bus routes are arranged in six categories (five numbered, one lettered). Since its inception in 1960, AC Transit has used both numbers and letters to distinguish routes. Many Transbay rail lines were inherited from the Key System and converted to bus routes, and AC Transit continued to use letters to identify the routes. Many Transbay routes continue to follow the original Key System alignments to some degree. The number and letter ranges listed below do not mean that all numbers or letters within a range are in use.

Numbered routes operate within the East Bay:

- 1-99 primarily serve the northwestern part of Contra Costa County and most of Alameda County.
- 200-299 serve the southern part of Alameda County and Milpitas.
- 600-699 operate primarily on school days only.
- 700-799 are Early Bird Express lines, which are replacing early-morning BART service during a seismic retrofit of the Transbay Tube
- 800-899 are part of the All Nighter network, which provides bus service during owl hours and at times when BART is not operating.

One- and two-digit route numbers are sometimes used as a "base" number for three-digit route numbers. For example, Route 840 is "based" on Route 40.

Lettered routes (A-Z) provide Transbay service (i.e., service across the San Francisco Bay by bridge) between the East Bay and San Francisco, San Mateo, and Santa Clara Counties.

Suffixes (also lettered) are used to distinguish variations in route alignments. Currently, A, B, L, M, S, and X are used. Some suffixes have specific meanings:

- L denotes Limited stop service, where not all local stops are served. Used on Routes 46L, 72L, and NL.
- X denotes Express service, where portions of the main route are skipped entirely. Used on Routes NX and NX3.

Supplemental numerical suffixes are used to differentiate route variations for lines that already use a lettered suffix. This is the case with the NX lines listed above.

Note: Routes listed below are current as of 14 June 2026.

== Local service ==
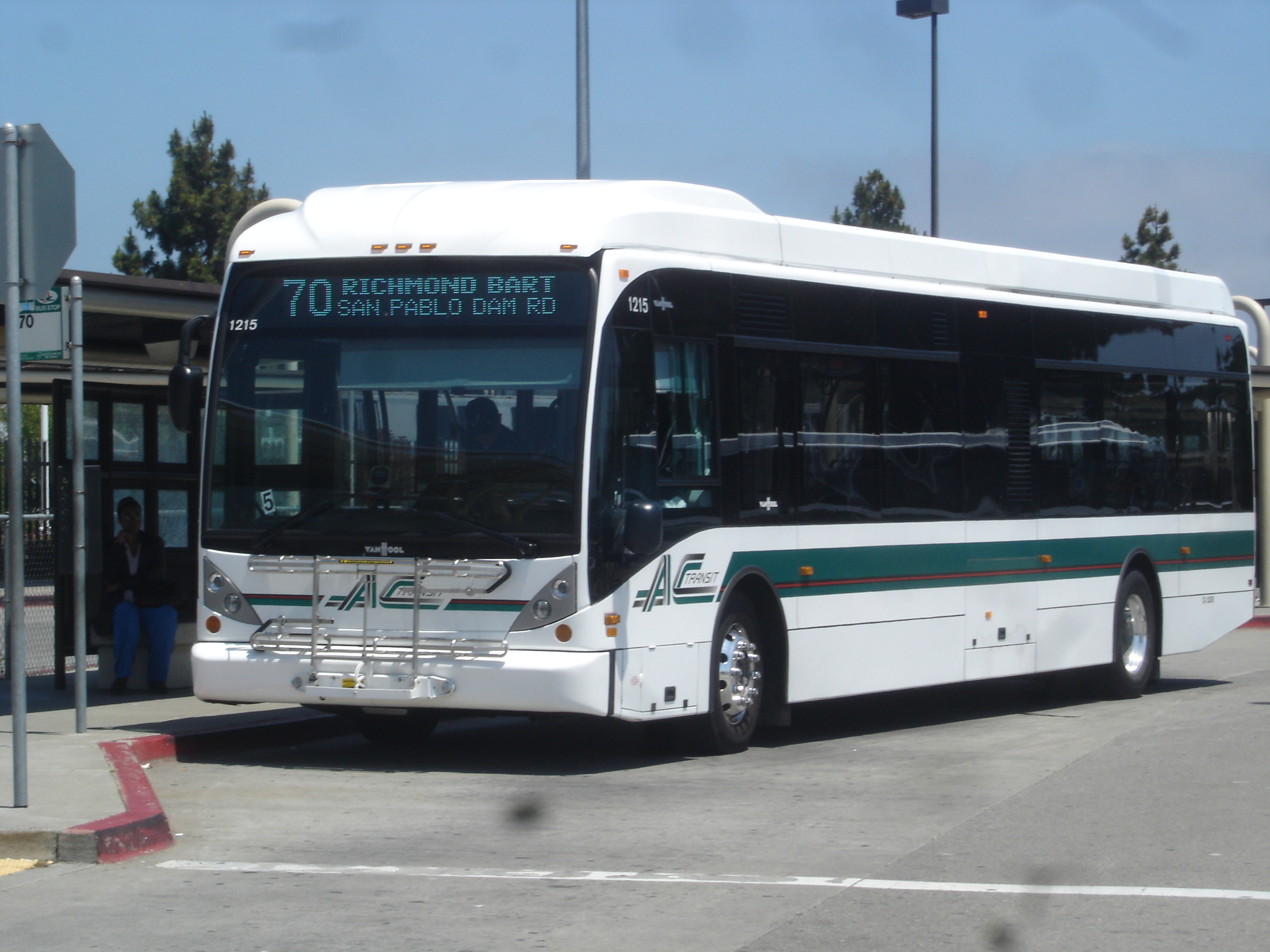
An AC Transit bus operating as Route 70 at the Richmond BART/Amtrak Station.

These routes serve various cities, towns, and attractions in Alameda and Contra Costa counties. One route also serves Milpitas in Santa Clara County. Several routes provide deviations on select trips, where a bus serves a particular business or school that is not on the regular route.

Historically, Route 51 has been considered the busiest bus route in the East Bay, connecting the cities of Berkeley, Oakland, and Alameda. However, this route was split into Routes 51A and 51B in March 2010.

In early 2015, following several rounds of community meetings, AC Transit announced a proposal for a radical rerouting and redesignation of many lines throughout their service area due to extra funds made available by the passage of Measure BB in November 2014. Called AC Go, the program looks at redesigning bus lines throughout the system to reflect the changing traveling habits of its residents by providing more frequent service on its busiest lines while rerouting others to better serve adjoining communities.

In August 2025, AC Transit launched Realign, a major overhaul of the bus network that aims to provide more reliable service in the East Bay by simplifying routes and connecting new destinations.

Route	Direction	Terminals		Days of Operation	Cities and Communities Served	Connecting Rail Station(s)	Average Weekday Frequency
Route	Direction	North/East Terminal	South/West Terminal	Days of Operation	Cities and Communities Served	Connecting Rail Station(s)	Average Weekday Frequency
6	North-south	Downtown Berkeley BART (Shattuck & Center)	Downtown Oakland (10th & Washington)	Daily	Berkeley, Oakland	Downtown Berkeley, MacArthur, 19th Street Oakland, 12th Street Oakland City Center	Every 12 minutes
7	North-south	El Cerrito del Norte BART	Public Market Emeryville (Christie & 64th)	Daily	El Cerrito, Kensington, Berkeley	El Cerrito del Norte, Downtown Berkeley, Ashby	Every 60 minutes
9	North-south	San Leandro BART	Union City BART	Daily	San Leandro, Hayward, Union City	San Leandro, Bay Fair, Hayward BART, South Hayward, Union City	Every 15 minutes
12	North-south	Berkeley (Gilman & 6th)	Oakland Amtrak (Jack London Square)	Daily	Berkeley, Oakland	Ashby, 19th Street Oakland, 12th Street Oakland City Center	Every 20 minutes
14	East-west	Fruitvale BART	West Oakland BART	Daily	Oakland	West Oakland, 12th Street Oakland City Center, Fruitvale	Every 20 minutes
18	North-south	Albany (10th & Monroe)	Montclair (Mountain & Antioch)	Daily	Albany, Berkeley, Oakland, Montclair	Downtown Berkeley, Ashby, MacArthur, 19th Street Oakland, 12th Street Oakland City Center	Every 15 minutes
19	North-south	Downtown Oakland (11th & Jefferson)	Fruitvale BART	Daily	Oakland, Alameda (Buena Vista)	12th Street Oakland City Center, Fruitvale	Every 65 minutes
22	North-south	Downtown Berkeley (Oxford & Addison)	Oakland (Mandana & Lakeshore)	Daily	Berkeley, Emeryville, Oakland	Downtown Berkeley, West Oakland, 12th St Oakland City Center	Every 30 minutes
27	North-south	El Cerrito Plaza BART	Emeryville Amtrak (Horton & 59th)	Daily	El Cerrito, Kensington, Berkeley, Emeryville	El Cerrito Plaza, Downtown Berkeley, Ashby, Emeryville Amtrak	Every 30 minutes
28	North-south	San Leandro BART	Hayward BART	Daily	San Leandro, Hayward, Castro Valley	San Leandro, Hayward BART, Castro Valley	Every 40 minutes
30	East-west	Dimond District (Fruitvale & MacArthur)	Daily until 10 PM: Downtown Oakland (11th & MLK Jr. Way)	Daily	Oakland, Alameda	Fruitvale, 12th Street Oakland City Center	Every 30 minutes
30	East-west	Dimond District (Fruitvale & MacArthur)	Daily after 10 PM: Alameda (South Shore Center)	Daily	Oakland, Alameda	Fruitvale, 12th Street Oakland City Center	Every 30 minutes
31	East-west	Select weekday trips before 9 PM & Weekends all-day: Chabot Space and Science Center	Alameda (Bay Farm Island)	Daily	Oakland, Alameda, Harbor Bay Ferry Terminal	Fruitvale	Every 30 minutes (south and west of Skyline & Joaquin Miller); Every 60 minutes (along Skyline Blvd, alternating between trips to Skyline High School and trips to Chabot Space and Science Center)
31	East-west	Select weekday trips before 9 PM: Skyline High School (Skyline & Balmoral)	Alameda (Bay Farm Island)	Daily	Oakland, Alameda, Harbor Bay Ferry Terminal	Fruitvale	Every 30 minutes (south and west of Skyline & Joaquin Miller); Every 60 minutes (along Skyline Blvd, alternating between trips to Skyline High School and trips to Chabot Space and Science Center)
31	East-west	Weekdays after 9 PM: Dimond District (Fruitvale & MacArthur)	Alameda (Bay Farm Island)	Daily	Oakland, Alameda, Harbor Bay Ferry Terminal	Fruitvale	Every 30 minutes (south and west of Skyline & Joaquin Miller); Every 60 minutes (along Skyline Blvd, alternating between trips to Skyline High School and trips to Chabot Space and Science Center)
34	North-South	Foothill Square (Foothill & 106th)	Hayward BART	Daily	Oakland, San Leandro, San Lorenzo, Cherryland, Hayward	San Leandro, Hayward BART, Hayward Amtrak	Every 40 minutes
35	North-South	Foothill Square (Foothill & 106th)	All trips: Bay Fair BART	Daily	Oakland, San Leandro	San Leandro, Bay Fair	Every 40 minutes
35	North-South	Foothill Square (Foothill & 106th)	Weekend & holiday extension: Alameda County Juvenile Justice Center	Daily	Oakland, San Leandro	San Leandro, Bay Fair	Every 40 minutes
36	North-south	Rockridge BART	West Oakland BART	Daily	Berkeley, Emeryville, Oakland	Rockridge, Downtown Berkeley (walking distance), West Oakland	Every 30 minutes
40	North-south	Downtown Oakland (11th & Jefferson)	All trips: Eastmont Transit Center	Daily	Oakland, San Leandro	12th Street Oakland City Center, Bay Fair	Every 10 minutes (north and west of Eastmont Transit Center); Every 20 minutes (south and east of Eastmont Transit Center)
40	North-south	Downtown Oakland (11th & Jefferson)	Select trips: Bay Fair BART	Daily	Oakland, San Leandro	12th Street Oakland City Center, Bay Fair	Every 10 minutes (north and west of Eastmont Transit Center); Every 20 minutes (south and east of Eastmont Transit Center)
41	North-South	Hayward BART	Union Landing Transit Center	Daily	Hayward, Union City	Hayward BART, South Hayward	Every 60 minutes
45	East-west	Foothill Square (MacArthur & 107th)	Eastmont Transit Center	Daily	Oakland	Coliseum	Every 20 minutes
46L	East-west	Grass Valley (Golf Links & Shetland)	Oakland Coliseum station	Weekdays	Oakland	Coliseum	Every 60 minutes
51A	North-south	Rockridge BART	Fruitvale BART	Daily	Oakland, Alameda	Rockridge, 19th Street Oakland, 12th Street Oakland City Center, Fruitvale	Every 12 minutes
51B	North-south	Most trips: Berkeley Amtrak	Rockridge BART	Daily	Berkeley, Oakland	Berkeley Amtrak, Downtown Berkeley, Rockridge	Every 12 minutes (east and south of University & 6th); Every 24 minutes (west of University & 6th, alternating between trips to Berkeley Marina and trips to Berkeley Amtrak)
51B	North-south	Select trips: Berkeley Marina	Rockridge BART	Daily	Berkeley, Oakland	Berkeley Amtrak, Downtown Berkeley, Rockridge	Every 12 minutes (east and south of University & 6th); Every 24 minutes (west of University & 6th, alternating between trips to Berkeley Marina and trips to Berkeley Amtrak)
52	North-south	UC Village (10th & Monroe)	UC Berkeley (Bancroft & Telegraph)	Daily	Albany, Berkeley	North Berkeley, Downtown Berkeley	Every 15 minutes
54	East-west	Merritt College	Daily until 7 PM: East Oakland (Seminary & San Leandro)	Daily	Oakland	Fruitvale	Every 20 minutes
54	East-west	Merritt College	Daily after 7 PM: Fruitvale BART	Daily	Oakland	Fruitvale	Every 20 minutes
56	North-South	Hayward BART	Union Landing Transit Center	Daily	Hayward, Union City	Hayward BART, Hayward Amtrak	Every 40 minutes
57	East-west	Foothill Square (MacArthur & 107th)	Emeryville Public Market	Daily	Emeryville, Oakland	MacArthur	Every 15 minutes
60	East-west	Hayward (Cal State East Bay)	All trips: Hayward BART	Daily	Hayward	Hayward BART, South Hayward	Every 45 minutes
60	East-west	Hayward (Cal State East Bay)	Most weekday trips & all weekend/holiday trips: South Hayward BART	Daily	Hayward	Hayward BART, South Hayward	Every 45 minutes
62	East-west	Fruitvale BART	West Oakland BART	Daily	Oakland	West Oakland, Lake Merritt, Fruitvale	Every 20 minutes
65	East-west	Select trips: UC Berkeley (Lawrence Hall of Science)	Downtown Berkeley BART	Weekdays	Berkeley	Downtown Berkeley	Every 45 minutes (combined, from Downtown Berkeley to Grizzly Peak & Senior); Every 90 minutes (alternating between trips to Lawrence Hall and trips via Senior Ave)
65	East-west	Select trips: Berkeley (Grizzly Peak & Senior)	Downtown Berkeley BART	Weekdays	Berkeley	Downtown Berkeley	Every 45 minutes (combined, from Downtown Berkeley to Grizzly Peak & Senior); Every 90 minutes (alternating between trips to Lawrence Hall and trips via Senior Ave)
67	North-south	Kensington (Kenyon & Trinity)	Downtown Berkeley BART	Weekdays	Kensington, Berkeley	Downtown Berkeley	Every 60 minutes
70	North-south	Richmond Parkway Transit Center	El Cerrito del Norte BART	Daily	Richmond, Pinole, El Sobrante, San Pablo	El Cerrito del Norte, Richmond	Every 30 minutes
71	North-south	Richmond Parkway Transit Center	El Cerrito Plaza BART	Daily	Richmond, El Cerrito	Richmond, El Cerrito Plaza	Every 30 minutes
72	North-south	Contra Costa College	Downtown Oakland (Jack London Square)	Daily	Richmond, San Pablo, El Cerrito, Albany, Berkeley, Emeryville, Oakland	El Cerrito del Norte, El Cerrito Plaza, 19th Street Oakland, 12th Street Oakland City Center	Every 30 minutes (combined 15 minutes with 72M south and east of Macdonald Ave)
72L	North-south	Contra Costa College	Downtown Oakland (Jack London Square)	Daily	San Pablo, Richmond, El Cerrito, Albany, Berkeley, Emeryville, Oakland	El Cerrito del Norte, 19th Street Oakland, 12th Street Oakland City Center	Every 30 minutes
72M	North-south	Point Richmond (Tewksbury & Castro)	Jack London Square	Daily	Richmond, El Cerrito, Albany, Berkeley, Emeryville, Oakland	Richmond, El Cerrito del Norte, El Cerrito Plaza, 19th Street Oakland, 12th Street Oakland City Center	Every 30 minutes (combined 15 minutes with 72 south and east of Macdonald Ave)
73	East-west	Eastmont Transit Center	Oakland International Airport	Daily	Oakland	Coliseum	Every 20 minutes
74	North-south	El Sobrante (Valley View & Jo Lin)	Richmond Marina (Ford Point)	Daily	El Sobrante, San Pablo, Richmond	Richmond	Every 30 minutes
76	East-west	El Cerrito del Norte BART	Richmond Parkway Transit Center	Daily	Richmond, San Pablo, North Richmond, El Cerrito	Richmond, El Cerrito del Norte	Every 30 minutes
86	North-south	Hayward BART	South Hayward BART	Daily	Hayward	Hayward BART, South Hayward	Every 40 minutes
88	North-south	Downtown Berkeley BART (Shattuck & Center)	Piedmont (Highland Ave & Highland Way)	Daily	Berkeley, Oakland	Downtown Berkeley, 12th Street Oakland City Center	Every 20 minutes
90	East-west	Oakland Coliseum station	Foothill Square (107th & Foothill)	Daily	Oakland	Coliseum	Every 20 minutes
93	East-west	Bay Fair BART	Castro Valley BART	Daily	San Leandro, Ashland, Cherryland, San Lorenzo, Hayward, Castro Valley	Bay Fair, Hayward Amtrak, Hayward BART, Castro Valley	Every 40 minutes
95	North-south	Fairview District (Kelly & Eddy)	Hayward BART	Daily	Hayward	Hayward BART	Every 40 minutes
96	East-west	Dimond District (Fruitvale & Montana)	Alameda Point (W. Midway & Monarch)	Daily	Oakland, Alameda	12th Street Oakland City Center	Every 30 minutes
97	North-south	Bay Fair BART	Union City BART	Daily	San Leandro, San Lorenzo, Hayward, Union City	Bay Fair, Union City	Every 15 minutes (peak hours); Every 20 minutes (other times)
98	East-west	Oakland Coliseum station	Eastmont Transit Center	Daily	Oakland	Coliseum	Every 20 minutes
200	North-South	Union City BART	Fremont BART	Daily	Union City, Newark, Fremont	Union City, Fremont BART	Every 30 minutes
210	North-south	Union Landing Transit Center	Fremont (Ohlone College)	Daily	Union City, Fremont	Fremont–Centerville	Every 30 minutes
211	North-south	Union City BART	All trips: Fremont BART	Daily	Union City, Fremont	Union City, Fremont–Centerville, Fremont BART, Warm Springs/South Fremont	Every 30 minutes
211	North-south	Union City BART	Morning to early night trips: Warm Springs/South Fremont BART	Daily	Union City, Fremont	Union City, Fremont–Centerville, Fremont BART, Warm Springs/South Fremont	Every 30 minutes
216	North-south	Union City BART	Newark (Silliman Recreation Center)	Daily	Union City, Fremont, Newark	Union City, Fremont BART	Every 60 minutes
231	North-south	Fremont BART	Milpitas BART	Daily	Fremont, Milpitas	Fremont BART, Warm Springs/South Fremont, Milpitas	Every 40 minutes
239	North-south	Fremont BART	Milpitas (Milpitas & Dixon Landing)	Daily	Fremont, Milpitas	Fremont BART, Warm Springs/South Fremont	Every 30 minutes
251	East-west	Fremont BART	Weekdays: Newark (Ohlone College Newark Campus)	Daily	Fremont, Newark	Fremont BART, Fremont–Centerville	Every 60 minutes
251	East-west	Fremont BART	Weekends & holidays: Newark (Silliman Recreation Center)	Daily	Fremont, Newark	Fremont BART, Fremont–Centerville	Every 60 minutes
281	North-south	Union City BART	Newark (NewPark Mall)	Daily	Union City, Fremont, Newark	Union City	Every 60 minutes

=== Tempo service ===
Tempo is the branded bus rapid transit service operated by AC Transit.

Route	Route Name	Direction	Terminals		Days of Operation	Cities and Communities Served	Connecting BART Station(s)
Route	Route Name	Direction	North Terminal	South Terminal	Days of Operation	Cities and Communities Served	Connecting BART Station(s)
1T	Tempo	North-south	Uptown Transit Center	San Leandro BART	Daily	Oakland, San Leandro	19th Street Oakland, 12th Street Oakland City Center, Fruitvale, San Leandro

This route provides the following amenities and features:

- Frequent service
- Stop spacing every 1/4–1/2 mile (0.4–0.8 km)
- Passenger shelters with Tempo branding
- Transit Signal Priority (TSP) so buses spend less time waiting at traffic signals

=== Broadway Shuttle ===
The Broadway Shuttle, also known as The Free B, is a free shuttle service operating along Broadway in downtown Oakland as part of the Meet Downtown Oakland program. Service is operated by AC Transit under contract with the City of Oakland. Funding is provided by the City of Oakland, Alameda County Transportation Commission, and Bay Area Air Quality Management District with additional sponsorships from Jack London Square, Jack London Improvement District, Downtown Oakland Association, and Lake Merritt-Uptown District Association.

The Broadway Shuttle began in August 2010 and was expanded twice, first in July 2011 and again in December 2014. Late-night Friday and all Saturday service was discontinued in August 2017. The B operates two routes:

Route	Map Color	Terminals		Days and Hours of Operation	Service Frequency
Route	Map Color	North Terminal	South Terminal	Days and Hours of Operation	Service Frequency
Day	Orange	Grand & Webster	Webster & Embarcadero	Weekdays, 7 AM - 7 PM	Every 10–15 minutes
Night	Blue	Broadway & 27th Street	Webster & Embarcadero	Weekdays, 7 PM - 10 PM	Every 12 minutes

=== FLEX service ===
In 2016, AC Transit started operating two FLEX services that provide on-demand van service to riders in Castro Valley and Newark. These services require passengers to book their trips online, using a smartphone app, or by telephone (up to three months in advance), and vans arrive within 30 minutes after the reservation is made. Customers boarding at a BART station do not need to reserve a trip and can just tell the operator their final destination. Fares are identical to the local fares, and Clipper cards are accepted. These services operate Mondays to Fridays from 6am to 8pm (except holidays).

Route	BART Terminal	Departure Times	Communities Served	Service Notes
Castro Valley	Castro Valley	Hourly at :30 past	Castro Valley	Operated alongside former Route 48, with expanded service to surrounding neighborhoods in northern Castro Valley
North Newark	Union City	Every 30 minutes, at :10 and :40 past	Newark	Operates around the general area of currently suspended Route 275, with additional service to Ardenwood Park & Ride and Newark Senior Center

== Early Bird Express ==
On February 11, 2019, the beginning of BART service on weekdays was changed from 4:00 am to 5:00 am for a three-year period to allow for overnight seismic retrofit work in the Transbay Tube. Out of the six Early Bird Express routes currently operated, three are operated by AC Transit, providing Transbay service between 3:50 am and 5:30 am to the Salesforce Transit Center.

Route	Terminals	
Route	Outer terminal	Inner terminal
701	Pittsburg/Bay Point station	Salesforce Transit Center
702	Pleasant Hill station	Salesforce Transit Center
703	Dublin/Pleasanton station	Salesforce Transit Center

== Transbay service ==
These routes cross San Francisco Bay and connect the East Bay with San Francisco, San Mateo, and Santa Clara Counties. All routes except Route 800 are lettered. (Route 800 is part of the All Nighter network and is listed in its respective section.) Most Transbay routes operate weekdays only during commute periods; three routes operate daily. Most commute-only routes operate westbound from the East Bay in the morning and eastbound to the East Bay in the afternoon, but some service is provided in the reverse commute direction.

=== Serving San Francisco ===
All bus routes serving San Francisco cross the San Francisco–Oakland Bay Bridge and terminate at the Salesforce Transit Center (at the third floor).

Route	Terminal	Days of Operation	Cities and Communities Served	Connecting BART Station(s)	Local Travel Permitted
E	Berkeley Hills (Parkwood Apartments)	Weekdays (commute only)	Oakland, Berkeley	N/A	Yes
F	UC Berkeley (Hearst & Oxford or Bancroft & Dana)	Daily	Emeryville, Oakland, Berkeley	Downtown Berkeley, Ashby	Yes
FS	Berkeley (Solano & Colusa)	Weekdays (commute only)	Berkeley	Downtown Berkeley	No
G	El Cerrito (El Cerrito Plaza BART)	Weekdays (commute only)	Berkeley, Albany, El Cerrito	El Cerrito Plaza	No
J	Berkeley (Sacramento & University)	Weekdays (commute only)	Emeryville, Berkeley	N/A	No
L	Richmond Parkway Transit Center	Weekdays (commute only)	Albany, El Cerrito, Richmond, San Pablo	El Cerrito del Norte	No
NL	East Oakland (Eastmont Transit Center)	Daily	Oakland	19th Street/Oakland	Yes
NX	East Oakland (Seminary & MacArthur)	Weekdays (commute only)	Oakland	N/A	No
NX3	San Leandro (Marlow & Foothill)	Weekdays (commute only)	Oakland, San Leandro	N/A	No
O	Oakland (Fruitvale BART)	Daily	Oakland, Alameda	Fruitvale	Yes
P	Piedmont (Highland Avenue & Highland Way)	Weekdays (commute only)	Oakland, Piedmont	N/A	No
V	Oakland (Broadway & College)	Weekdays (commute only)	Oakland	N/A	No
W	AM terminal: Bay Farm Island (Robert Davey Jr & Packet Landing)	Weekdays (commute only)	Oakland, Alameda	N/A	No
W	PM terminal: Bay Farm Island (Island Drive Park & Ride)	Weekdays (commute only)	Oakland, Alameda	N/A	No

=== Service via the Dumbarton Bridge ===
AC Transit operates one route between the East Bay and Santa Clara County via the Dumbarton Bridge. Additional bus service across the Dumbarton Bridge is provided by Dumbarton Express, which is a Transbay bus service provided under a consortium of five transit operators (AC Transit, BART, SamTrans, Union City Transit, and VTA). Dumbarton Express was operated by AC Transit through December 16, 2011 before being transferred to a contractor.

Route	Terminals		Days of Operation	Cities and Communities Served	Connecting Facilities	Local Travel Permitted
Route	East Bay Terminal	Peninsula Terminal	Days of Operation	Cities and Communities Served	Connecting Facilities	Local Travel Permitted
U	Fremont BART	AM terminal: Stanford Shopping Center (Quarry & Vineyard)	Weekdays (commute only)	Fremont, Newark, Palo Alto	Fremont BART, Fremont-Centerville Amtrak/ACE, Ardenwood Park & Ride	No
U	Fremont BART	PM terminal: Stanford Oval	Weekdays (commute only)	Fremont, Newark, Palo Alto	Fremont BART, Fremont-Centerville Amtrak/ACE, Ardenwood Park & Ride	No

== School service ==
A series of routes serve a variety of public and private middle, junior high, and high schools in Alameda and Contra Costa Counties. These routes generally operate only when school is in session. While these lines are open to all riders at regular fares, they do not operate during most school breaks and holidays. Some regular local bus routes also provide supplemental school service to nearby schools. These routes are usually timed to match the morning and afternoon bell schedules of all schools served.

There are 46 school routes numbered between 600 and 699: 604, 605, 606, 607, 617, 620, 621, 623, 624, 625, 627, 629, 631, 633, 638, 639, 641, 642, 646, 648, 649, 650, 651, 652, 653, 654, 655, 657, 658, 660, 662, 663, 667, 669, 675, 677, 678, 680, 681, 682, 683, 684, 687, 688, 689, and 696.

== All Nighter service ==
Several transit agencies in the Bay Area, including AC Transit, participate in the All Nighter program. All Nighter buses provide overnight bus service when BART and Caltrain are not operating. AC Transit Route 800 is the backbone of this network, serving eleven or thirteen BART and four Muni Metro stations en route.

All AC Transit All Nighter routes, except for Route 801, provide timed transfers at Broadway and 14th Street in downtown Oakland. All routes operate daily including holidays, generally from midnight to 5:00 AM. Weekend morning service on Routes 800 and 801 extends until 6 AM on Saturdays and 8 AM on Sundays, corresponding to the start of BART service for the day.

Route	Direction	Terminals		Cities and Communities Served	Connecting BART/Muni Station(s)
Route	Direction	North/East Terminal	South/West Terminal	Cities and Communities Served	Connecting BART/Muni Station(s)
800	East-west	Richmond BART	San Francisco (Van Ness Muni Metro)	San Francisco, Oakland, Berkeley, Albany, El Cerrito, Richmond	Van Ness Muni, Civic Center/UN Plaza†, Powell Street†, Montgomery Street†, West Oakland†, 12th Street/Oakland, 19th Street/Oakland, MacArthur, Ashby, Downtown Berkeley, El Cerrito del Norte, Richmond † Stops are only serviced in the eastbound direction.
801	North-south	San Leandro BART	Fremont BART	San Leandro, Hayward, Union City, Fremont	San Leandro, Bay Fair, Hayward, South Hayward, Union City, Fremont
802	North-south	Oakland (14th & Broadway)	Berkeley Amtrak (University & Third)	Oakland, Emeryville, Berkeley	12th Street/Oakland, 19th Street/Oakland
805	East-west	Oakland (14th & Broadway)	Oakland International Airport	Oakland	12th Street/Oakland, 19th Street/Oakland, Coliseum
840	North-south	Oakland (14th & Broadway)	East Oakland (Eastmont Transit Center)	Oakland	12th Street/Oakland, Lake Merritt (on 11th & 12th streets)
851	North-south	Downtown Berkeley BART (Shattuck & Center)	Fruitvale BART	Berkeley, Oakland, Alameda	Downtown Berkeley, Rockridge, 19th Street/Oakland, 12th Street/Oakland, Fruitvale
