= Dumbarton Express =

Bus service in the San Francisco Bay Area

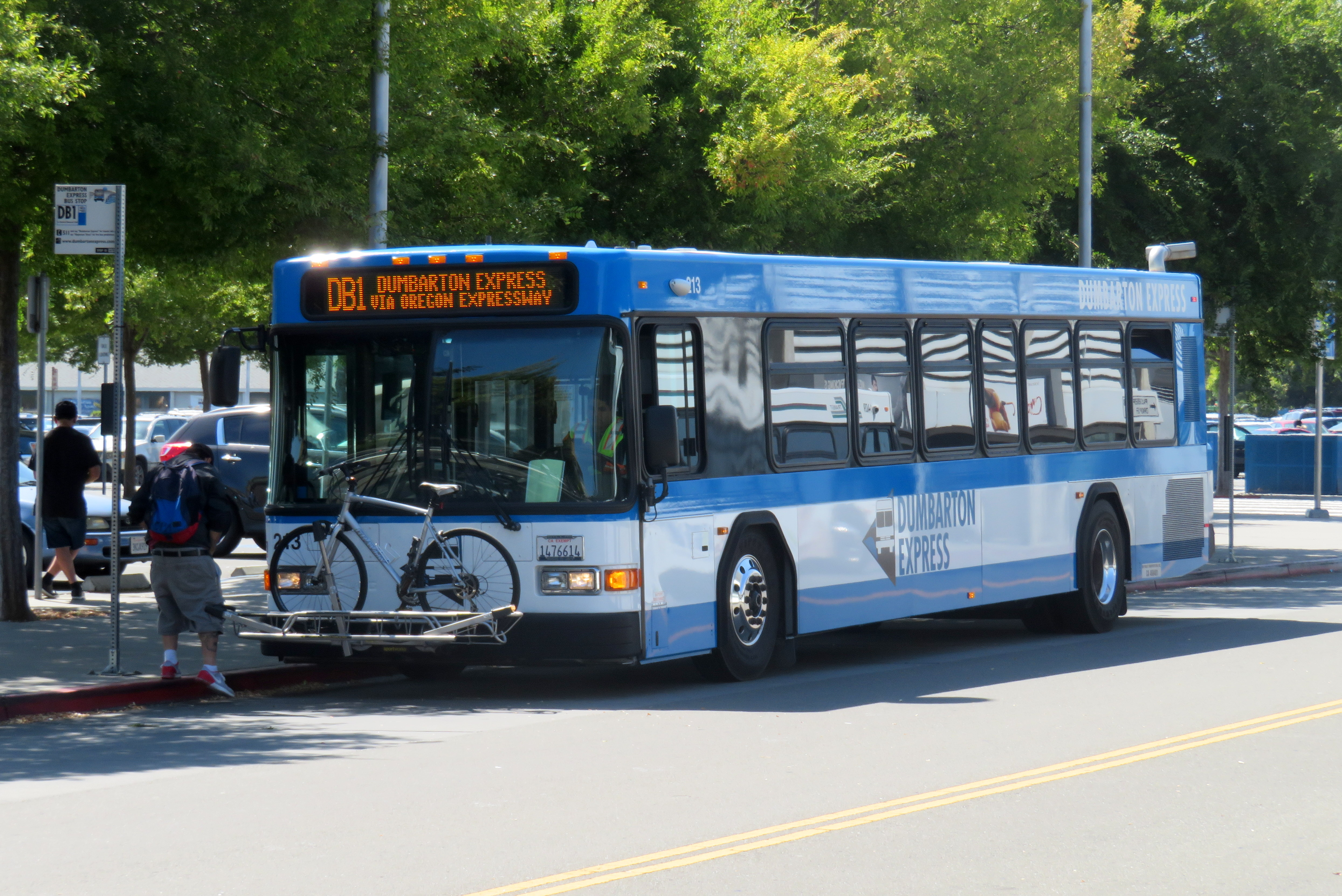
- Dumbarton Express bus at Union City station
- Founded: September 10, 1984
- Locale: San Francisco Bay Area
- Service area: Alameda, San Mateo, and Santa Clara Counties
- Service type: Bus service
- Routes: 2
- Operator: MV Transportation
- Website: dumbartonexpress.com

Dumbarton Express is a regional public transit service in the San Francisco Bay Area connecting Alameda, San Mateo, and Santa Clara Counties via the Dumbarton Bridge, the system's namesake. The bus service is funded by a consortium of five transit agencies (AC Transit, BART, SamTrans, Union City Transit, and VTA). Dumbarton Express is administered by AC Transit and operated under contract by MV Transportation.

== Service ==
Dumbarton Express operates two weekday-only routes:

- Route DB operates between Union City station and the Stanford University campus via Palo Alto station
- Route DB1 operates between Union City station and the Stanford Research Park

Dumbarton Express allows passengers to ride locally in the East Bay and Peninsula, without crossing the bridge.

== History ==
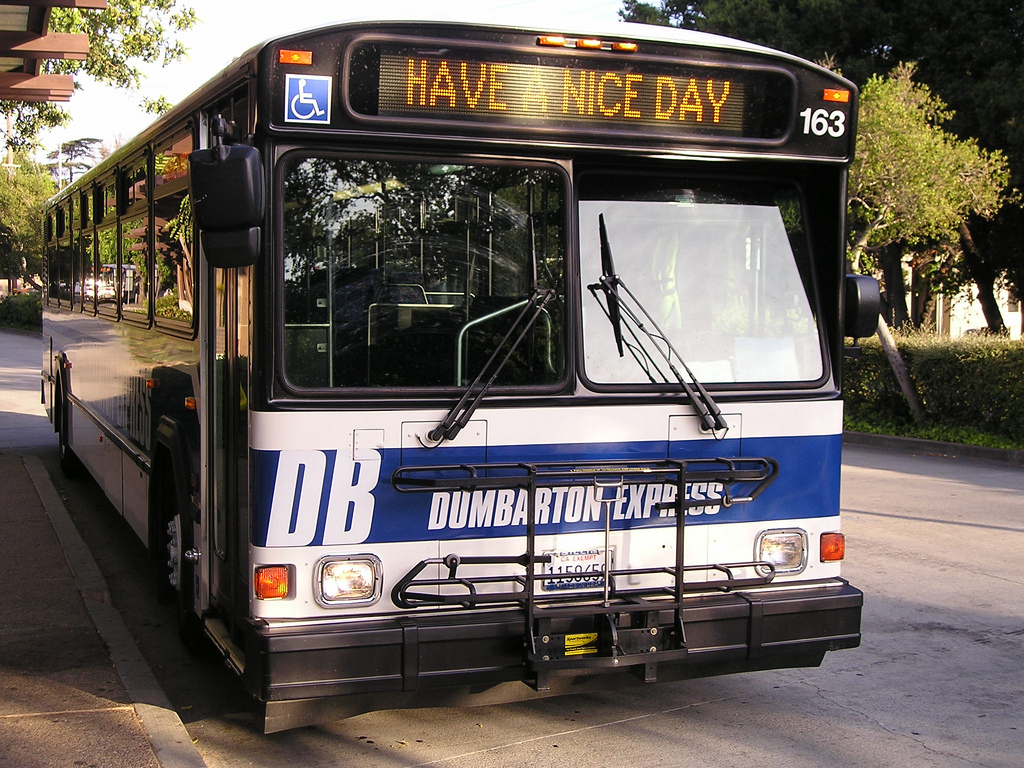
Dumbarton Express bus in 2004

AC Transit began operating peak-hour service between Union City station and Palo Alto station on September 10, 1984. The yearlong trial service was funded by the Metropolitan Transportation Commission. The DB1 route serving the Stanford Research Park was added within a year. By 1987, route DB was also extended to the industrial park via a different route. A private company took over operations in January 1989, with AC Transit continuing to administer the service.

In 1993, five transit agencies (AC Transit, BART, SamTrans, Union City Transit, and VTA) formed a consortium to fund the service. A third route, DB2, was introduced in October 1998. It operated between Union City station and the East Palo Alto area. The route saw low ridership and was discontinued on June 30, 2001. AC Transit again became the service operator in March 2005.

AC Transit introduced a separate Dumbarton Bridge transbay service, route U, on August 29, 2004. Not part of the Dumbarton Express brand, it serves Fremont station rather than Union City station. On December 23, 2007, AC Transit extended its route M over the Dumbarton Bridge to Union City station, replacing route MA (which operated via the San Mateo Bridge). The route M extension was discontinued on March 28, 2010. It was replaced with AC Transit route DA between Ardenwood and Redwood Shores, which operated until December 15, 2013.

By 2009, some reverse-peak trips (eastbound in the morning and westbound in the afternoon) were routed via East Palo Alto and designated DB3. On December 19, 2011, route DB3 was discontinued, and MV Transportation replaced AC Transit as the operator of Dumbarton Express service. At that time, the service cost $2.1 million annually to operate, of which fare revenues covered $0.5 million. Service was increased by 80% on July 2, 2012, with service on route DB1 tripled. Route DB was rerouted to terminate at The Oval on the Stanford University campus, while route DB1 was extended to cover part of the former DB route in the Stanford Research Park.

On August 2, 2017, SamTrans released a study that examined the feasibility of adding additional bus routes to the service. The study recommended two new bus routes: an express route traveling between Union City station and Redwood City Caltrain station, and a local route between the Union City BART station to job centers in northern Mountain View and Sunnyvale. The introduction of the two routes was expected to more than double Dumbarton Express ridership. Rail service between Redwood City and Union City on the Dumbarton Rail Corridor is also proposed.
