= Emery Go-Round =

Public bus system in Emeryville, California

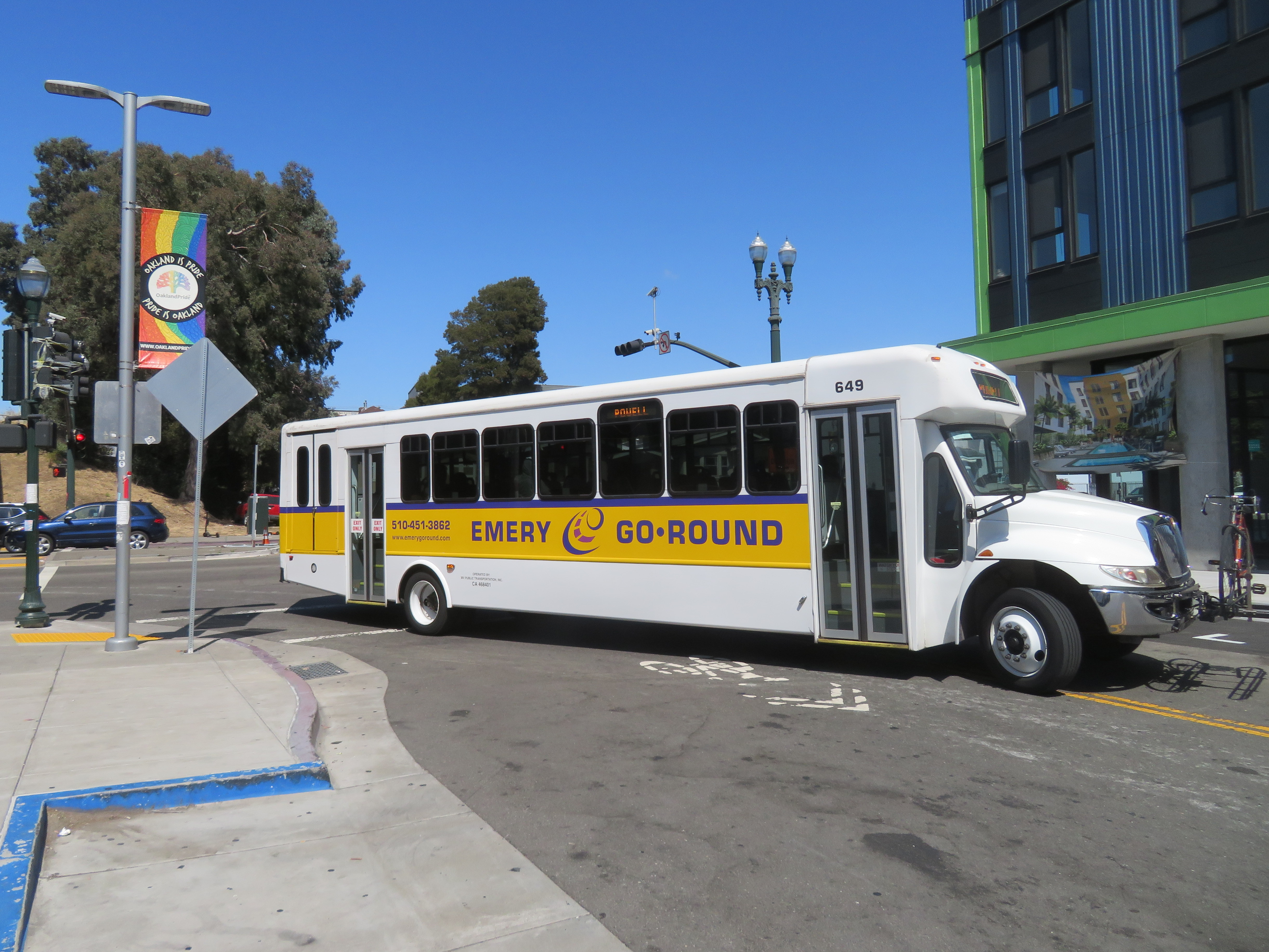
- An Emery Go-Round bus at MacArthur station
- Parent: Emeryville Transportation Management Association
- Headquarters: 1300 67th Street; Emeryville, California
- Service area: Emeryville, Oakland, Berkeley
- Service type: bus service
- Routes: 2
- Hubs: MacArthur BART Station
- Operator: MV Transportation
- Website: emerygoround.com

Emery Go-Round is a fare-free public bus system serving Emeryville, California, a city in the East Bay region of the San Francisco Bay Area. Service is funded primarily by commercial property owners through a citywide transportation business improvement district. The name, a play on the term merry-go-round, is a reference to both Emeryville founder Joseph Stickney Emery and the bus routes, which are loops beginning and ending at MacArthur BART Station in the adjacent city of Oakland.

== Services ==
As of 2024, Emery Go-Round operates two fixed routes: Shellmound-Powell and Hollis. Service operates daily with 15-minute frequency, except on selected holidays, with reduced service levels on weekends and selected additional holidays.

Both routes are loops, beginning and ending at MacArthur BART Station in Oakland. The Shellmound-Powell route runs concurrently with AC Transit's Line 57 (fare required) from Emeryville Public Market to MacArthur BART.

Route Name	Destinations Served	Days of Operation	Schedule Information
Hollis	MacArthur BART, Pixar offices, Hollis Street, Emeryville Amtrak Station, Berkeley Bowl West	Weekdays	Hollis Schedule
Shellmound/Powell	MacArthur BART, East Bay Bridge Shopping Center, 40th Street, Bay Street, Shellmound Street, Public Market, Christie Avenue, Watergate, Powell Shopping Plaza	Daily	Shellmound/Powell Schedule Weekend Schedule
