= Fremont station =

Train station in Fremont, California

Fremont, CA
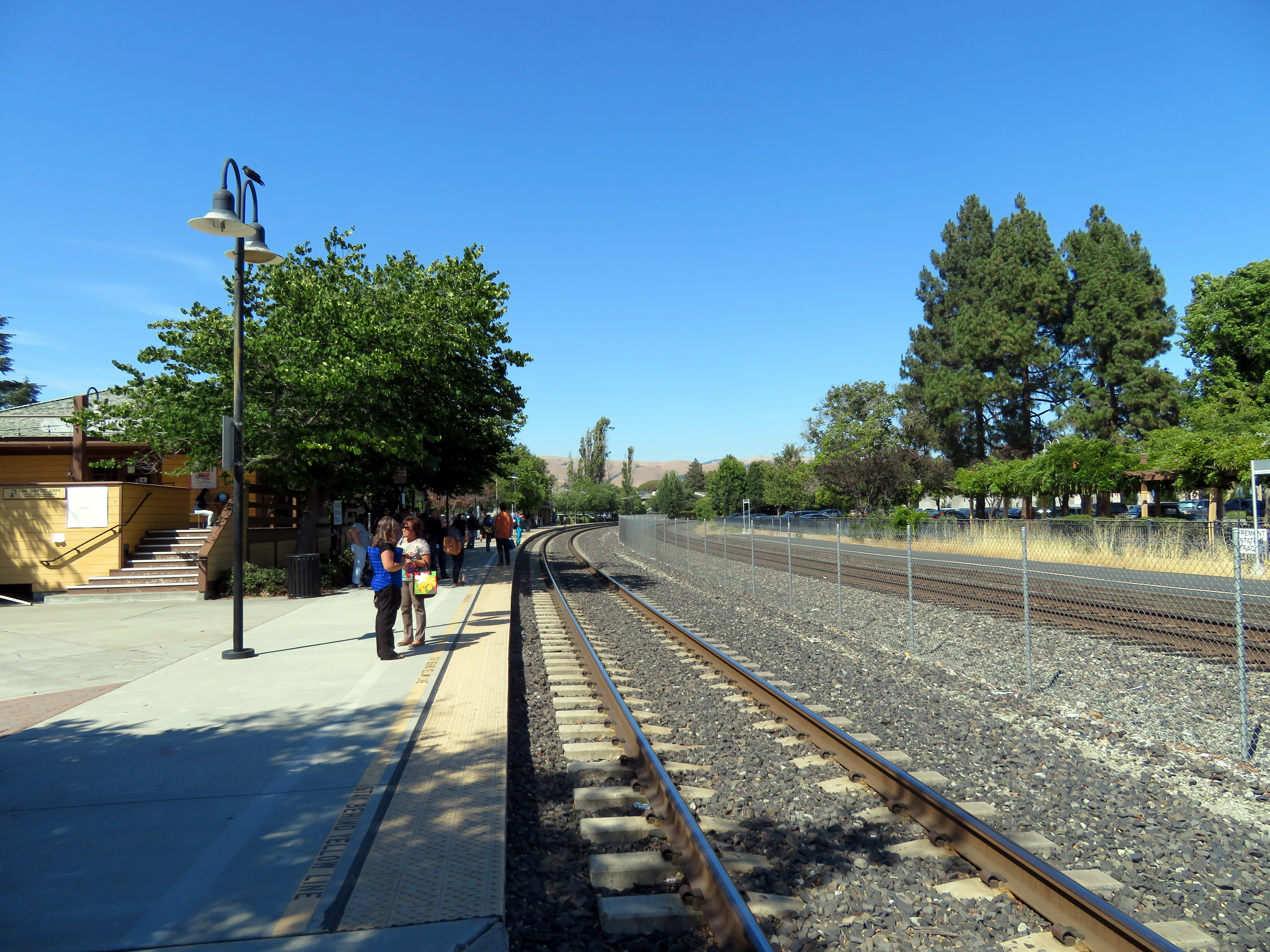
- The platforms at Fremont station in July 2018

General information
- Location: 37260 Fremont Boulevard; Fremont, California; United States
- Coordinates: 37.559097°N 122.007176°W
- Owner: City of Fremont
- Line: UP Niles Subdivision
- Platforms: 2 side platforms
- Tracks: 2
- Connections: AC Transit: 99, 210, 251, 801, U Stanford Marguerite Shuttle: AE‑F

Construction
- Parking: Yes
- Accessible: Yes

Other information
- Station code: Amtrak: FMT

History
- Opened: February 1882; June 4, 1993
- Closed: 1941
- Rebuilt: September 1910; June 1999
- Former names: Centerville, Fremont-Centerville
- Original company: South Pacific Coast Railroad

Passengers
- FY 2025: 32,781 (Amtrak)

Services
Preceding station	Amtrak	Following station
Hayward toward Auburn	Capitol Corridor	Santa Clara–Great America toward San Jose
Coast Starlight does not stop here
Preceding station	Altamont Corridor Express	Following station
Pleasanton toward Stockton	San Jose – Stockton	Great America toward San Jose
Location

Fremont station (also known as Fremont–Centerville station) is a train station located in the Centerville area of Fremont, California, United States. The station is served by Amtrak Capitol Corridor commuter rail/intercity rail service and the Altamont Corridor Express (ACE) commuter rail service. The station has two platforms serving the two tracks of the Niles Subdivision. Most trains use the longer west platform (Platform 1).

== History ==
Centerville's first railroad station opened as the terminus of the South Pacific Coast Railroad branch line from Newark in February 1882. Tracks terminated on the south side on Main Street (later Fremont Boulevard). Service was a mixed freight and passenger horsecar shuttle train with flag stops between the two termini. Steam service was initiated as the line was converted to standard gauge in 1909, with Southern Pacific Railroad also extending tracks further north to Niles.

A boxcar was moved to the site and functioned as the station building from May 1909 to September 1910. In that month the current wooden structure was opened. With a cost of under US$5,000, (Note: equivalent to $172,768 in 2025 adjusted for inflation) it was one of sixty Type 23 stations built by Southern Pacific (successor to the South Pacific Coast Railroad). The station was a busy one during its early years, handling both freight and passenger traffic, including two to three daily milk trains. By the mid-1920s, automobile traffic began to grow, and the milk trains were discontinued. Passenger service ended on March 29, 1940. The Railway Express Agency continued shipping to and from the station until 1958. The station was completely closed on September 30, 1961.

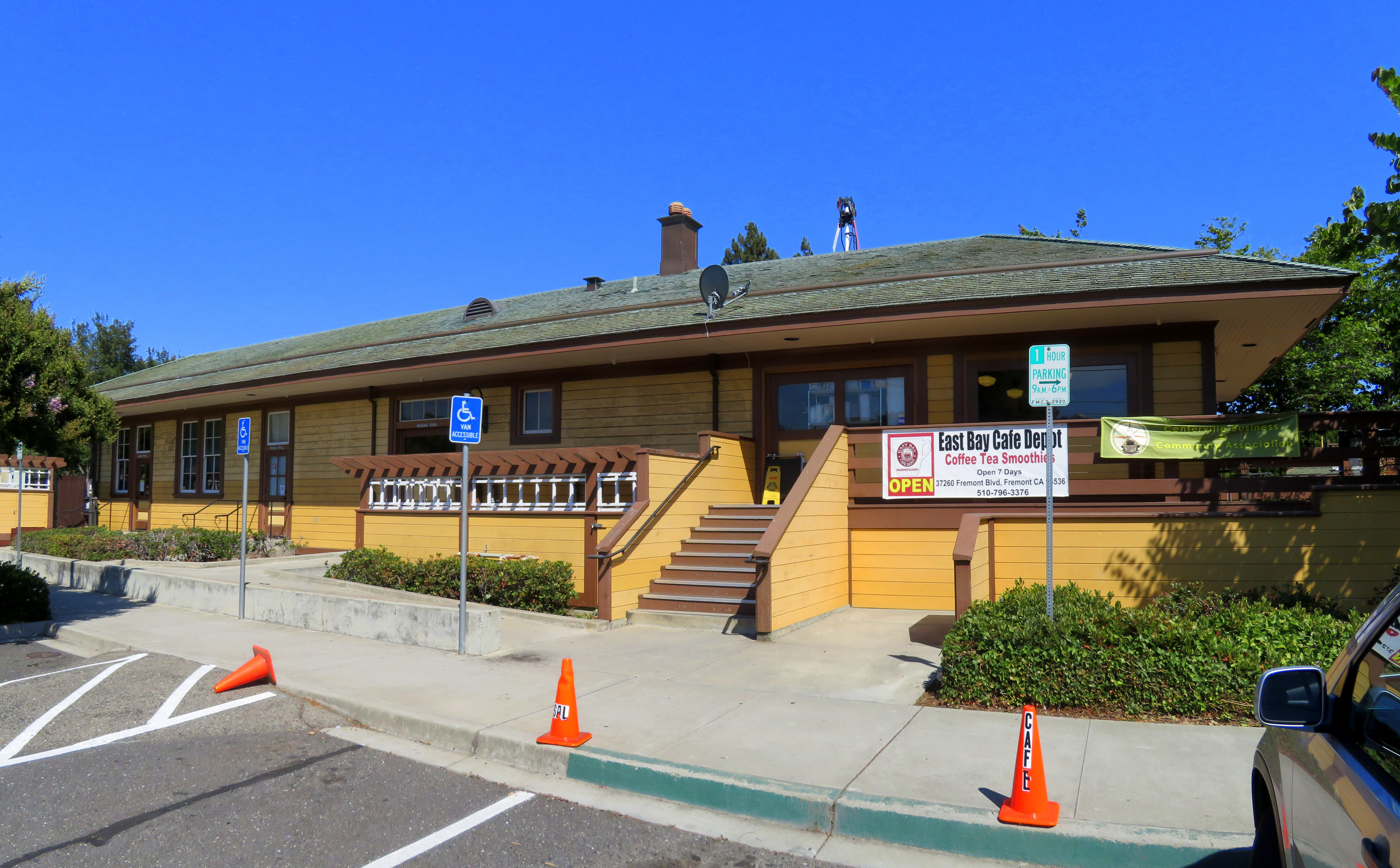
The station building in 2018

The station changed hands many times in the following decades, becoming a furniture store, a spice store, a toy store, and an electronics store at different times. Its condition deteriorated, however, and in 1991 it was abandoned. The Depot Diner, located at the west end of the depot, contains the historic "creamery" counter and chairs from Cloverdale Creamery (which closed in 2000). Fremont Flowers (which in 1956 opened in the depot) moved the original diner chairs and counter to the depot. The owner of the flower shop also owns the Depot Diner.

On June 4, 1993, Amtrak restored service to the depot. In December of that year, it was acquired by the city. On March 15, 1995, the station was moved from the south side of the tracks to the north side of the tracks; it was also rotated 180 degrees to allow for more parking space. The station was restored between October 1998 and June 12, 1999. The cost of these projects was over $900,000. The station now appears as it did in 1910. On November 23, 2002, a platform and shelter was built on the south side of the tracks. It is called the Bill Ball Plaza, named after a former mayor of Fremont.

In 2018, ACE was awarded $3.4 million (Note: equivalent to $4.36 million in 2025 adjusted for inflation) to extend one platform at Fremont to accommodate ten-car trains. The platforms were rebuilt in 2022–23 to improve accessibility as part of a 2020 Amtrak settlement. The work cost $4.2 million. (Note: equivalent to $4.44 million in 2025 adjusted for inflation)

The Dumbarton Rail Corridor project, which has been studied several times since the 1990s, would have Fremont as an intermediate station. A 2016-released Vision Plan called for Capitol Corridor trains to be rerouted over the Coast Subdivision, which is used by less freight service. Ardenwood Park & Ride would replace Fremont station for Amtrak service, though ACE service would still use Fremont.
