= Dumbarton Rail Corridor =

Proposed passenger rail line

- Dumbarton Rail logo (2014)

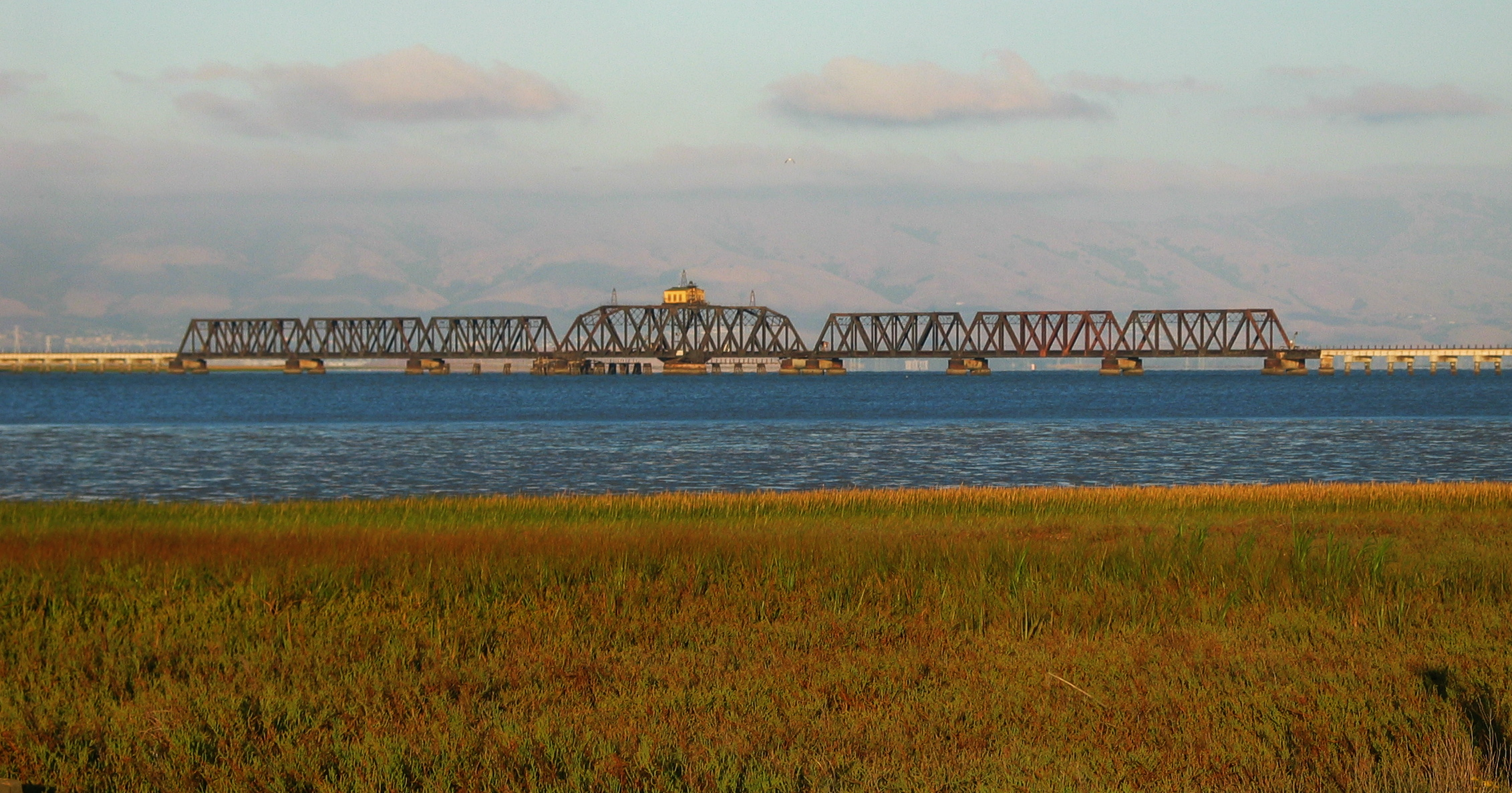
- DRC would reuse the right-of-way initially constructed in 1910, although the vintage Dumbarton Rail Bridge would likely be demolished and replaced.

Overview
- Owner: samTrans
- Locale: San Francisco Bay Area; Counties: Alameda and San Mateo
- Transit type: Commuter rail
- Number of lines: 1
- Number of stations: 4
- Daily ridership: 5,900 (anticipated, 2035)

Operation
- Number of vehicles: 6 trains (proposed)
- Train length: 500 feet (150 m) (proposed)

Technical
- System length: 20.5 mi (33.0 km)
- Track gauge: 4 ft 8 1/2 in (1,435 mm) (standard gauge)
- Top speed: 79 mph (127 km/h)

The Dumbarton Rail Corridor is a proposed transbay passenger rail line which would reuse the right-of-way that was initially constructed from 1907–1910 as the Dumbarton Cut-off. The Dumbarton Cut-off includes the first structure to span San Francisco Bay, the 1910 Dumbarton Rail Bridge, although the vintage Cut-off bridges would likely be replaced prior to activating new passenger service. Dumbarton Rail Corridor would provide service between Union City in the East Bay (where passengers could connect with BART, ACE and Capitol Corridor trains) and Menlo Park on the Peninsula, with train service continuing to both San Francisco and San José along the existing Caltrain tracks. It has been in the planning stages since 1988, and would be the first above-ground transbay rail line since Key System electric trains stopped running on the lower deck of the Bay Bridge in 1958, and the first new transbay crossing of any kind since the completion of the Transbay Tube in 1974.

== Route description ==
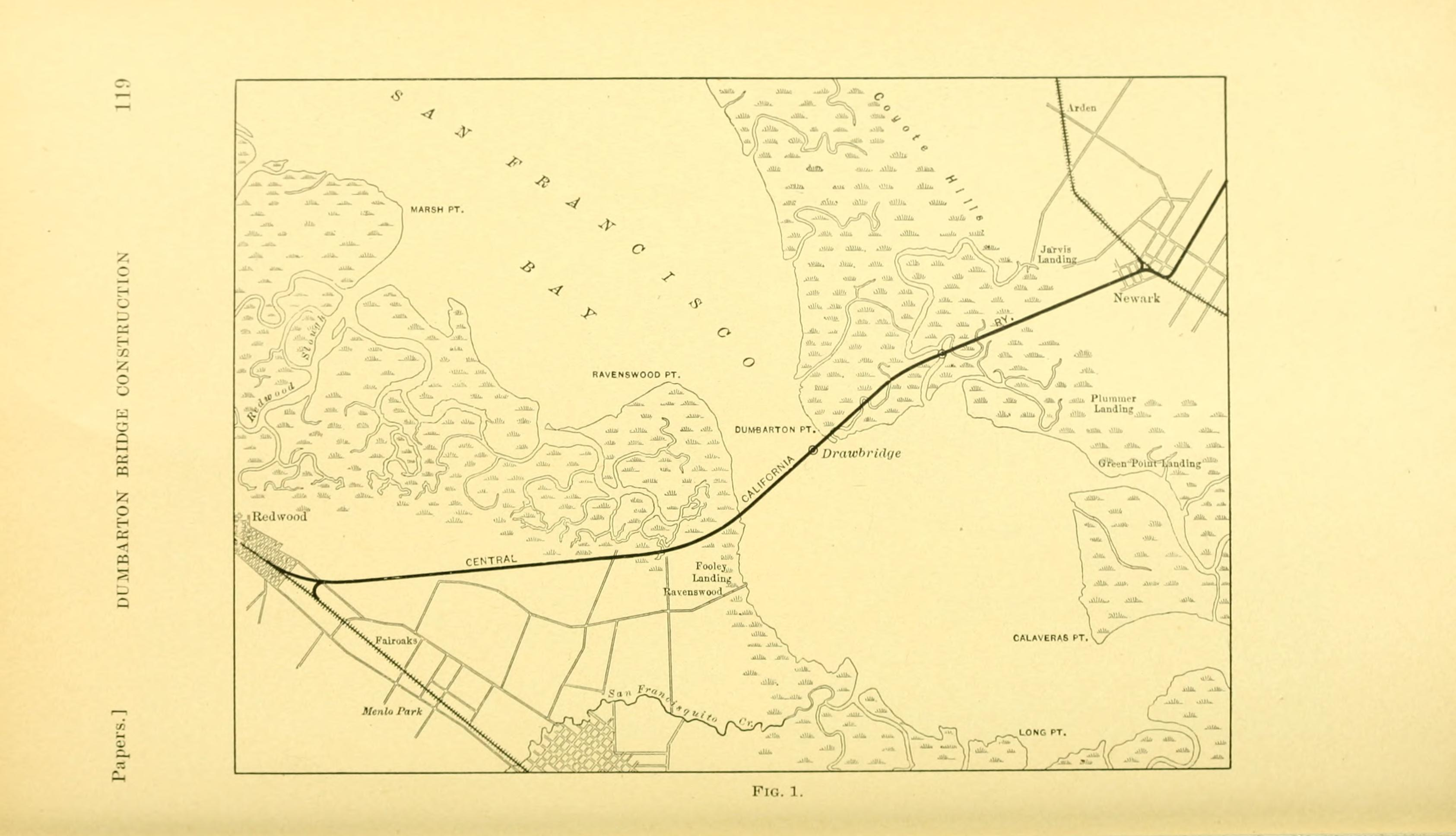
Central California Railway route (1910)

The Dumbarton Rail Corridor service, as proposed in 2006, would provide six westbound trains originating from the Union City BART station, rebuilt as an intermodal station; after crossing the rebuilt Dumbarton Cut-off bridges, the trains would join the existing Peninsula Corridor (Caltrain) line south of the existing Redwood City station. Three trains would proceed north to San Francisco and three trains would proceed south to San Jose. In the afternoon, the six trains would return from San Francisco and San Jose to Union City. The initial service offering would not include reverse commute (west-to-east in the mornings and east-to-west in the afternoons), mid-day, evening, or weekend trains.

=== Hayward to Centerville (Segments G/F) ===
Part of the Dumbarton Rail Corridor plans include a new connection between the Oakland subdivision (running generally north–south) and the Centerville line (running generally east–west) near Shinn Street, east of the Fremont–Centerville station. Trains originating in Union City would enter the Shinn connection, turning right from southbound to westbound, and pass under the BART tracks before joining the Centerville line. Freight traffic would be rerouted from the Oakland Subdivision to the parallel Niles Subdivision, slightly to the east. Other proposed improvements included a proposed fourteen-span bridge over Alameda Creek to separate freight and passenger traffic. Use of this segment would require acquisition of the right-of-way from Union Pacific. Capitol Corridor trains would be rerouted to the Oakland subdivision to share service at the Union City intermodal station.

A new layover yard would be required for overnight storage of trains. The layover yard was proposed to be north of Whipple Road in Hayward, and would provide overnight storage for trains entering the Union City station, rebuilt for intermodal service. Heavy maintenance activities (including refueling) would be performed at Caltrain yards on the Peninsula. A new segment, the Industrial Parkway connection, would be constructed to connect the Oakland subdivision and the Niles subdivision north of the layover yard.

=== Centerville to Newark (Segments E/D/C) ===
This segment would reuse the existing Dumbarton Cut-off line west of Newark Junction. Between Newark Junction and Fremont Centerville station, the segment would run on the Union Pacific Centerville line.

=== Newark to Menlo Park/East Palo Alto (Segment B) ===
This segment would reuse the existing line established for the Dumbarton Cut-off in 1910. It would be a single-track line with two sidings, one industrial siding to serve the Cargill Salt Plant and one future siding just east of the Dumbarton Rail Bridge. The industrial siding would be the existing line, with a new main line constructed around the salt loading facility.

The two swing bridges and their timber trestle approaches were known to be in poor shape since 1996, and a subsequent 2008 engineering investigation found the concrete foundations were also degraded, possibly since they were constructed in 1910. The 2003 Project Study Report proposed replacement of the Dumbarton Rail Bridge swing span with a bascule, replacement of the Newark Slough Bridge with a steel girder swing span, and new concrete trestles.

=== Menlo Park/East Palo Alto to Redwood City (Segment A) ===
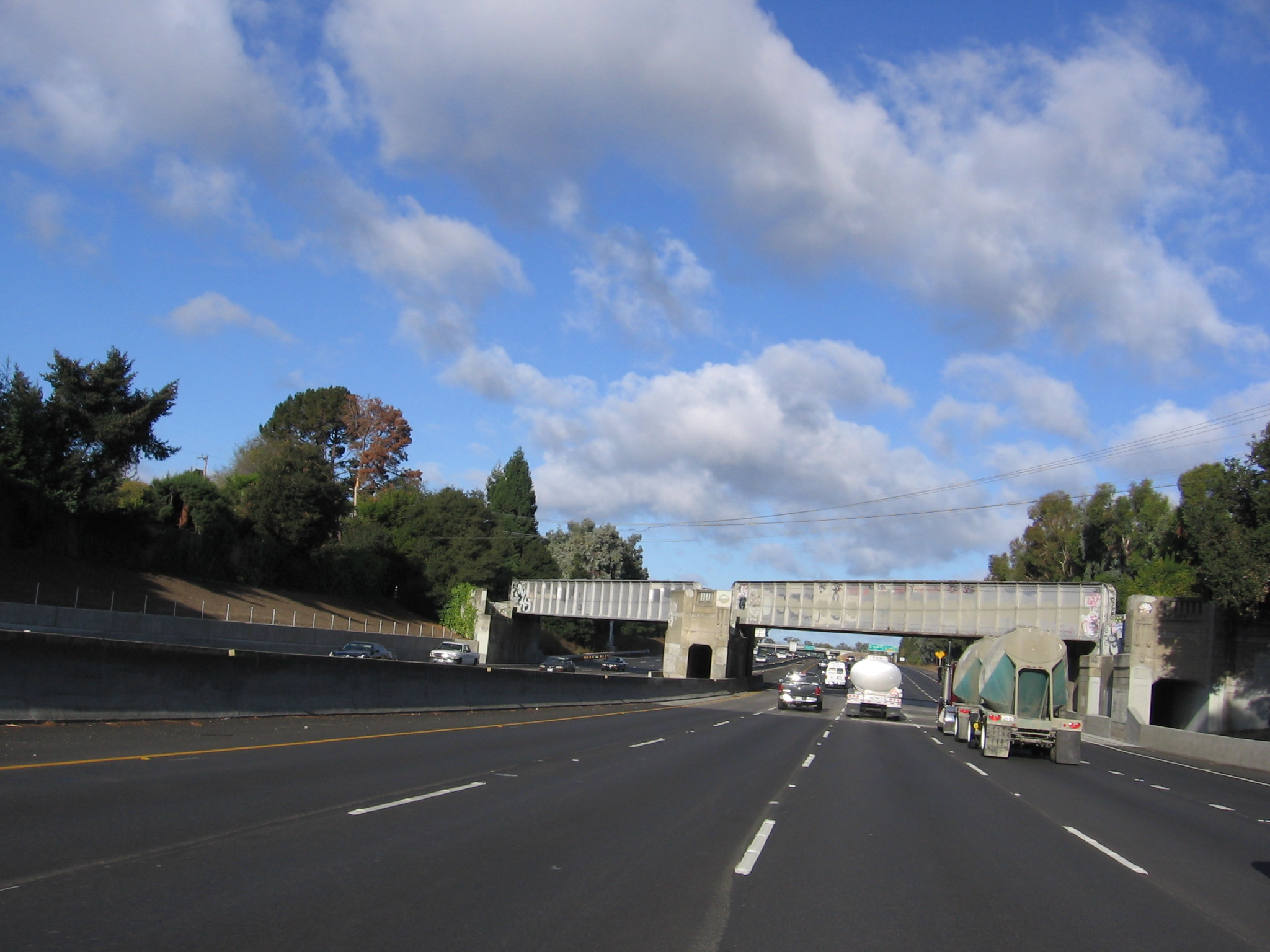
Dumbarton Rail Cut-off bridge over US 101 in Menlo Park. Note the bridge is built for a single track, but the concrete piers are sized to accommodate double-track service.

The existing two-track Dumbarton Cut-off line would be converted to a single track system with centralized traffic control; the second track would be retained as a siding in certain portions. This segment would include the proposed Willow Road and Redwood City (Second Avenue) stations. The Dumbarton Rail Corridor merges with the Peninsula Corridor in Redwood City at the Redwood Junction, which is a large wye roughly bounded by Middlefield Road, Woodside Road, El Camino Real, and Dumbarton Avenue.

=== Redwood City to San Francisco ===
Once on the Peninsula corridor, northbound morning trains would provide limited stop service at existing Caltrain stations in Redwood City, Hillsdale, San Mateo, Millbrae, South San Francisco, and San Francisco, with afternoon trains returning to Union City making the same stops, in reverse order.

=== Menlo Park to San Jose ===
Once on the Peninsula Corridor, southbound morning trains would stop at Menlo Park, Palo Alto, California Avenue, Mountain View, and San Jose, with afternoon trains returning to Union City making the same stops, in reverse order.

== Stations ==
- Dumbarton Rail Corridor proposed stations
- Existing stations rebuilt to add service
- New stations to be built
- Potential stations (expanded ridership)

From Union City, trains would stop at stations in Fremont (Fremont–Centerville station), Newark and Menlo Park/East Palo Alto before joining the main Caltrain line at Redwood City (northbound) or Menlo Park (southbound), with limited service to San Francisco or San Jose, respectively. Two more stations could be added in Redwood City (2nd Avenue) and Hayward (Hayward BART) if rider participation would justify the cost.

=== Hayward ===
The existing Hayward BART station could be rebuilt as an intermodal station and serve as the terminus for the Dumbarton Rail Corridor at a future date if ridership projections warrant. If Capitol Corridor trains are rerouted onto the Oakland subdivision, the existing Hayward stop would likely be moved to the new intermodal station.

Separately, Capitol Corridor has been considering moving trains on to the Mulford/Coast subdivision, the westernmost railroad in Alameda County, partially sharing the route for the Coast Starlight, which would discontinue service to Hayward and Fremont Centerville, and bypass Union City entirely.

=== Union City ===
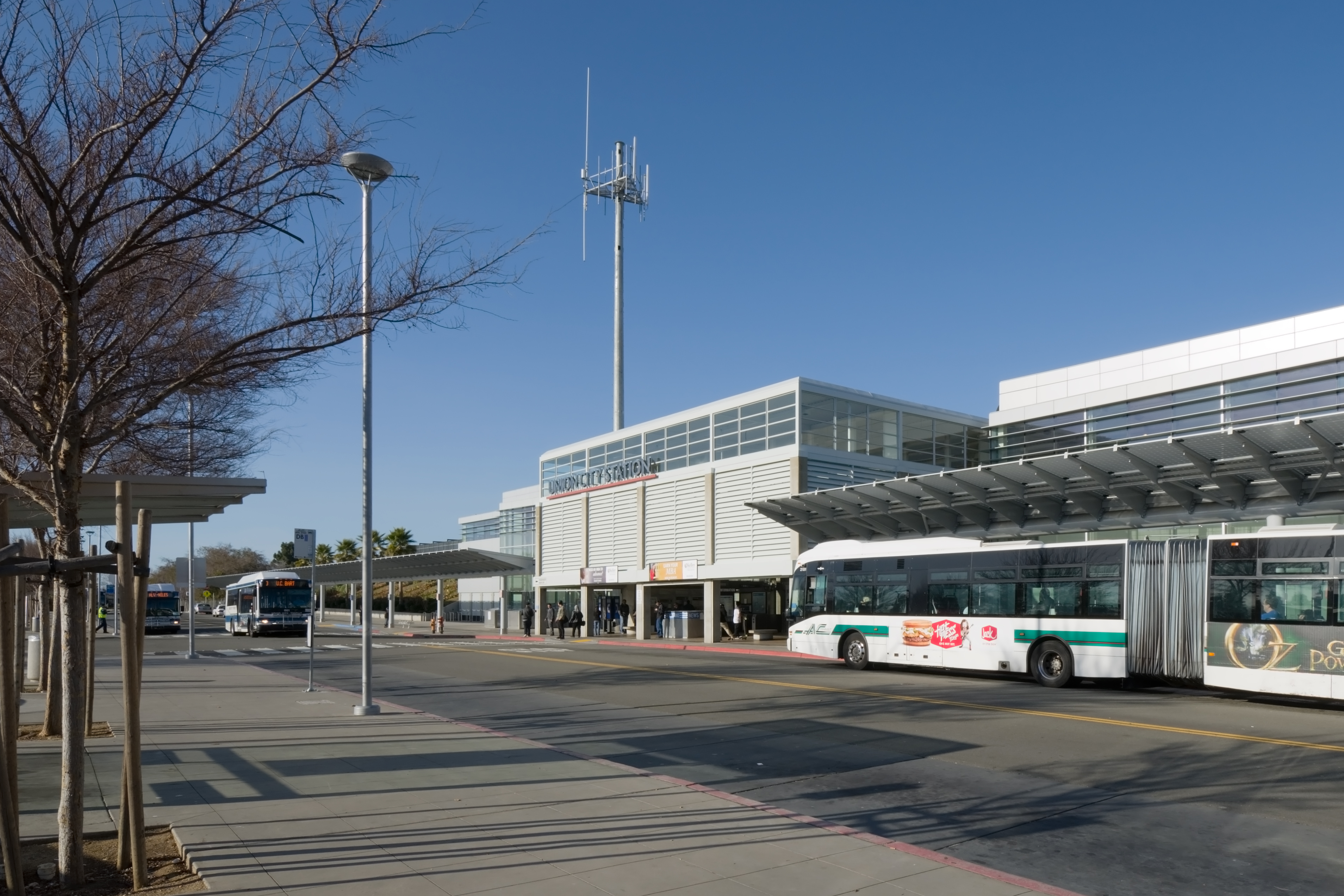
West side of Union City BART station

The existing Union City station was rebuilt as an intermodal station serving BART and AC Transit. Phase III of the intermodal station project would create a commuter rail station for Dumbarton Rail, ACE, and Capitol Corridor trains, linked to the BART station with a passenger bridge. The commuter rail station would be adjacent to the east side of the existing BART station.

Phase I of the Intermodal Station project was completed between 2007 and 2010, focusing on bus transit connections and west-side BART station improvements. Phase II focused on improving the east side of the BART station and preparing it for intermodal service with commuter rail.

=== Fremont Centerville ===
The existing Fremont Centerville station would add service for the Dumbarton Rail Corridor trains. The south platform would be rebuilt for Dumbarton Rail Corridor service, and new parking spaces would be added.

=== Newark ===
A new station would be constructed in Newark just west of Willow Street, south of Thornton Avenue. The Newark Station would feature a side platform south of the tracks, with space left for a future second main track.

=== Willow Road ===
A new station would be constructed in the Belle Haven neighborhood of Menlo Park, just west of Willow Road and south of State Route 84 (the Bayfront Expressway). Willow Road Station would feature one side platform south of the tracks.

=== Redwood City (2nd Ave) ===
A new station could be constructed just east of the Redwood Junction, again presuming ridership projections warrant another station.

== History ==
=== 1910–1982: Dumbarton Cut-off ===
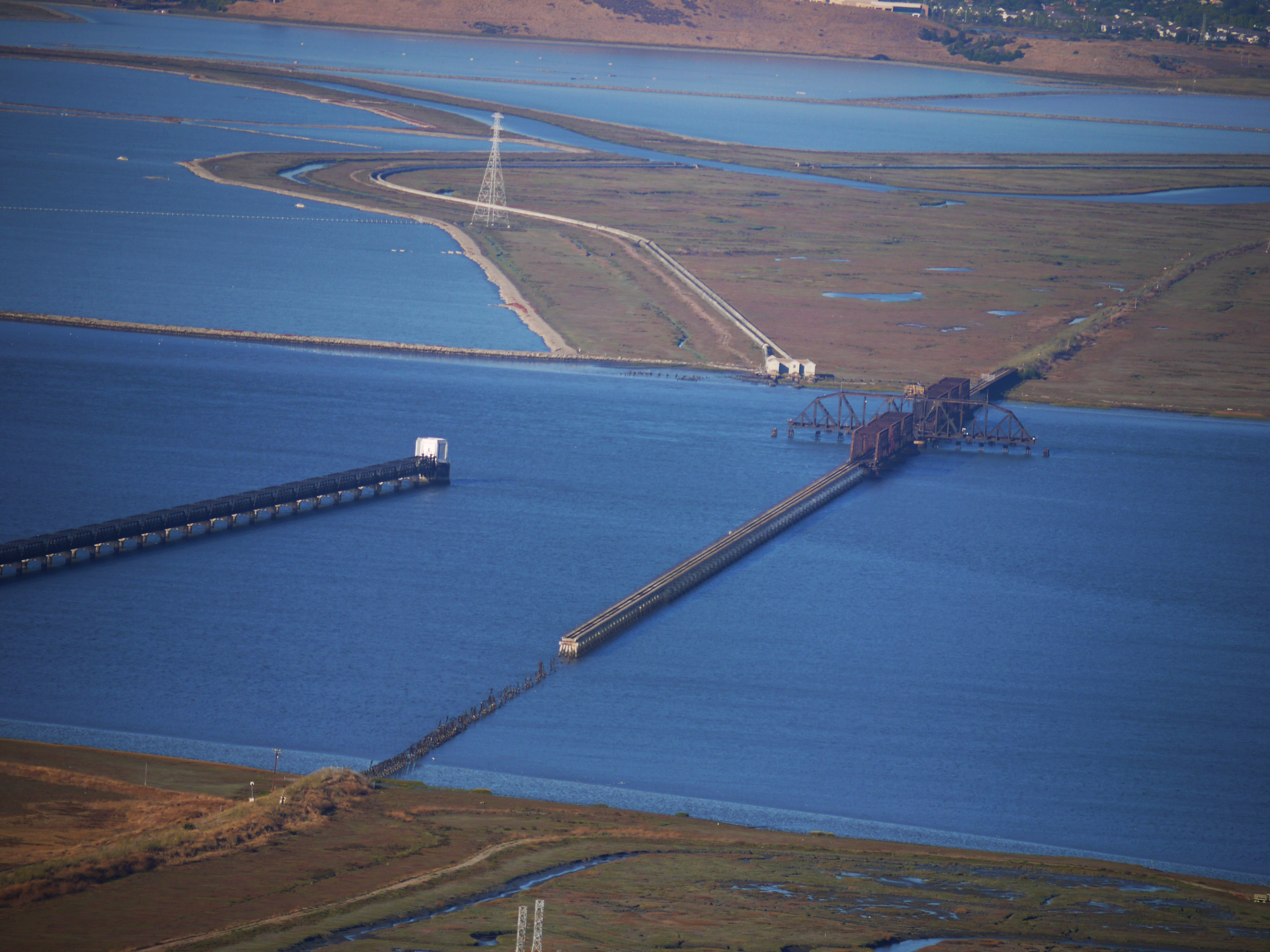
The Dumbarton Rail Bridge in 2010. View facing east; concrete trestle and burned timber trestle in the foreground. Hetch Hetchy Project water pipelines 1&2 on the left.

The Central California Railway Company, a subsidiary of Southern Pacific, completed the Dumbarton Cut-off in 1910, reducing the rail route distance between Oakland and San Francisco by 26.1 miles (42.0 km). Prior to the completion of the Cut-off, transcontinental freight destined for San Francisco was unloaded in Oakland and ferried across the Bay, or trains detoured through San Jose and Santa Clara, using the Peninsula Corridor to San Francisco. The Dumbarton Rail Bridge, a swing through-truss span, was the first structure built across San Francisco Bay. The Dumbarton Cut-off includes a second, smaller swing through-truss to the east of the Dumbarton Rail Bridge.

Some portions of the timber trestles had been replaced with concrete structures in the 1960s and 1970s. However, San Francisco gradually became a less important hub for rail transportation, and the Port of Oakland was better-suited to handle containerized shipping. The last freight train used the Dumbarton Cut-off in 1982.

=== 1988–2001: Initial studies ===
Proposed initial routing for DRC, including rerouted Capitol Corridor service and the (since-completed) extension of BART to Warm Springs

The San Mateo County Transit Authority (SMCTA) was created following the passage of 1988's Measure A, a half-cent sales tax increase in San Mateo County which set aside US$14,000,000 (equivalent to $38,100,000 in 2025) for the purchase of the "Dumbarton S.P. Spur from Redwood City to Fremont." A 1991 study sponsored by SMCTA, the Dumbarton Commuter Service Feasibility Study (Parsons Brinckerhoff) recommended a rail option along the former Dumbarton Cut-off as a long-term strategy. Pursuing this strategy, SamTrans purchased the entire right-of-way for US$6,900,000 (equivalent to $15,000,000 in 2025) in early 1994, with the help of a loan from Caltrans. More studies followed in 1996 (Dumbarton Rail Corridor Rehabilitation, Morrison Knudsen), 1997 (Dumbarton Corridor Study, Parsons Brinckerhoff), and 1998 (Dumbarton Corridor Transit Concept Plan), which concluded that trans-Bay rail was viable as a long-term strategy and expanded bus service could serve as a short-term strategy.

A suspected arson fire destroyed part of the western timber trestle approach to the Dumbarton Rail Bridge in January 1998, although the 1996 Dumbarton Rail Corridor Rehabilitation report (confirmed in a later 1999 study) had already concluded the timber trestles would need to be replaced. In 1998, the estimated cost for reactivating Dumbarton passenger rail service was US$50,000,000 (equivalent to $98,800,000 in 2025).

That 1999 study (the Dumbarton Rail Corridor Study, Parsons Transportation Group) put the Dumbarton rail project into the 2000 report Blueprint for the 21st Century, sponsored by the Metropolitan Transportation Commission (MTC). The 1999 report evaluated the cost estimates for rehabilitating the line from the 1996 report and concurred that the timber trestles should be replaced, the lower portion of the steel through-trusses should be replaced, and the two swing spans were severely corroded but operable in 1996. The 1999 Dumbarton Rail Corridor Study estimated the necessary improvements would cost a total of US$130,000,000 (equivalent to $251,200,000 in 2025).

In 2000, Santa Clara County voters approved Measure A, which set aside a portion of the funds generated from a half-cent sales tax increase for the Dumbarton Rail Corridor. A 2000 San Mateo County grand jury found that though the county of San Mateo would contribute the highest amount among the three funding counties (Alameda, San Mateo, and Santa Clara), the Dumbarton Rail service was projected to mainly aid Alameda County residents in reaching Santa Clara county destinations. California State Senator Jackie Speier introduced a bill in February 2000 that would devote US$90,000,000 (equivalent to $168,300,000 in 2025) to rehabilitating the Dumbarton Rail Bridge to add Altamont Corridor Express (ACE) service from Newark to San Jose; however, ACE officials rebuffed the offer, saying the bill added no money for purchasing new trains or funding operating costs.

By being included in the Blueprint for the 21st Century, MTC programmed funds for the Dumbarton Rail Corridor (DRC). DRC was identified as one of the nineteen high-priority rail and bus projects for transit expansion in the Bay Area as part of MTC's adoption of Resolution 3434 in December 2001. In 2001, MTC estimated the total capital cost for DRC was US$129,000,000 (equivalent to $234,600,000 in 2025); of that, 91% had been secured or was pending via local sales taxes in San Mateo, Alameda, and Santa Clara Counties.

=== 2003–2007: Scope and cost growth ===
In November 2004, MTC released a draft plan for spending over the next twenty-five years, entitled Transportation 2030, which included full funding to rehabilitate and reactivate the Dumbarton Rail Corridor. In 2004, the total capital cost had increased to an estimated US$277,600,000 (equivalent to $473,200,000 in 2025). However, Regional Measure 2, which had been passed by voters earlier in March 2004, set aside an additional US$135,000,000 (equivalent to $230,100,000 in 2025) for the Dumbarton Rail Corridor project from increased toll bridge revenues.

Much of the cost increase was driven by the 2003 Dumbarton Rail Corridor Project Study Report, which identified several deficiencies in the existing infrastructure. The 2003 Project Study Report proposed replacing the Dumbarton Rail Bridge swing span with a new bascule span, with the option for remote control from the Caltrain operations center or local control; the report also proposed replacing the Newark Slough Bridge swing span with a simpler steel girder swing span under local control, normally left closed to prioritize rail traffic over marine traffic. In addition, the Oakland subdivision would have to be purchased from Union Pacific, and UP indicated they were unwilling to sell only a portion, preferring to sell the entire right-of-way from Oakland to Fremont. The 2003 Project Study Report proposed constructing a new rail bridge across Alameda Creek for freight service over the Niles subdivision when Capitol Corridor passenger traffic was moved to the Oakland subdivision. However, this was seen as an illegal gift to Union Pacific from some citizens.

A May 2005 community meeting attracted overwhelming opposition from Fremont residents living near the proposed new routing of Capitol Corridor and Dumbarton Rail trains. Public meetings were held in November 2006, attracting mild support and residents echoing the same noise concerns from the May 2005 meeting. Menlo Park residents who had bought houses near the 1910 tracks (which had not seen rail service since 1982) were concerned about the possibility of train noise and potential freight use, despite Dumbarton Rail Corridor plans for the use of only passenger trains.

Dumbarton Rail Corridor logo (2006)

By March 2006, the estimated cost had increased again to US$313,000,000 (equivalent to $499,900,000 in 2025). The 2006 Environmental Phase 1 report studied four alternative rail alignments and two alternative bus services to determine the most feasible options. Costs nearly doubled to US$600,000,000 (equivalent to $958,200,000 in 2025) by October 2006, driven partly by inflation and partly by the increased cost of construction. Other sources cited the delayed environmental review process.

With the increase in costs, the Dumbarton Rail Corridor now faced a significant funding shortfall, since no new funds had been identified since the passage of Regional Measure 2 in 2004. In 2007, two more alternatives were studied for the DRC. Both called for the separation of freight and passenger traffic. Alternative 1 looked at a rehabilitated low-level single-track Dumbarton Rail Bridge, while Alternative 2 proposed a new high-level (fixed) double-track rail bridge. Based on projected ridership, a blend of both alternatives was proposed, retaining the low-level single-track drawbridge as marine traffic was expected to remain light.

=== 2004–2014: Regional Measure 2 funding ===
Regional Measure 2 (RM2) was approved by a majority of Bay Area voters in March 2004, raising toll rates by US$1 on the region's toll bridges. US$135,000,000 (equivalent to $230,100,000 in 2025) was allotted to the Dumbarton Rail Corridor project from the increased tolls as one of the headline projects cited by supporters of RM2. Construction on DRC was scheduled to start in 2006 with the passage of RM2.

MTC encountered cash flow issues for the BART Warm Springs Extension Project (WSX) in 2008; the expected US$145,000,000 (equivalent to $216,800,000 in 2025) surplus in fare revenue from the BART SFO extension was not available for the start of construction on the Warm Springs extension, and the funding shortfall was made up in part by proposing a shift of US$91,000,000 (equivalent to $136,100,000 in 2025) in RM2 funds from DRC to WSX. The draft Strategic Plan amending Resolution 3434 was presented in June 2008, placing projects in four tiers, depending on their state of readiness. WSX was deemed to be a "Tier 2" project, meaning it required more scope or cost refinement. DRC was a "Tier 4" project, meaning that its capital shortfall was greater than 50% of its total cost. The 2008 estimate for DRC capital costs was US$596,000,000 (equivalent to $891,200,000 in 2025), compared to the nearly US$300,000,000 (equivalent to $511,400,000 in 2025) in available funding that had been committed with the passage of RM2 in 2004. Since the recommended strategy going forward was to focus on delivering Tier 2 projects, MTC Staff recommended shifting the money from DRC to WSX. The proposal was met with considerable antipathy. DRC would be repaid in Alameda County Regional Transportation Improvement Program funds over eight years, from FY 2019–20 to 2026–27, without accounting for inflation. The majority of public speakers in a July 2008 argued against the funding transfer, saying that funds dedicated for transbay travel should remain dedicated to transbay projects.

In September 2008, MTC Vice Chair Scott Haggerty defended the shift, arguing that "The bottom line is that the Warm Springs BART extension is ready to go and the Dumbarton Rail project is not." Others questioned the need for DRC, as the expected growth in road traffic over the Dumbarton Bridge had failed to materialize. MTC was required to hold a public hearing to approve reassignment of funds, which occurred on 14 January 2009. The DRC to WSX funding shift was met with more public opposition, who questioned both the legal authority of MTC to reassign these funds and the strength of MTC's commitment to DRC. California Streets and Highways Code Section 30914(f) gives MTC the authority to reallocate funds "to another project within the same bridge corridor," and the WSX does not provide the same transbay service as DRC. Regardless, MTC unanimously approved the funding shift after the public hearing and withstood a subsequent legal challenge. A suit was filed seeking an injunction to block the transfer of funds, but the suit was rejected. MTC went on the offensive after the suit was rejected, threatening the plaintiffs with "any and all available remedies," and the plaintiffs dropped their lawsuit.

With the loan of $91 million to WSX, Dumbarton Rail retained $44 million in RM2 funds. Alameda County Measure B1, which would have restored US$120,000,000 (equivalent to $168,300,000 in 2025) via a half-cent sales tax increase, failed to pass in 2012. In February 2014, MTC's Programming and Allocations Committee advanced a recommendation to redirect the remaining money from Dumbarton Rail to other projects; $9 million had already been spent on environmental studies for DRC, leaving $35 million, which would be redistributed with $20 million going to Caltrain Electrification and $15 million going to replace Dumbarton Express buses. The February presentation also redefined the $91 million loan as an "investment in BART to Warm Springs" with "No future repayment from Alameda County" necessary. The $20 million for Caltrain electrification was predicated on Caltrain receiving local matching funds, which had not been previously requested of other RM2 reallocation projects.

A public hearing was held in April 2014, with the majority of comments directed towards the Dumbarton Rail proposals. In the response to public comments, the MTC staff response stated "the Dumbarton Rail Bridge connects north–south corridors on both sides of the San Francisco Bay [...] Therefore, staff considers the investment in the Warm Springs Extension (and the Caltrain Electrification Program) to be appropriate investments of these bridge toll funds." The staff response went on to mention Alameda County Transportation Commission and Santa Clara Valley Transportation Authority had already either reprogrammed DRC funds or failed to provide funds for DRC.

After 2014, RM2 funds (aside from the $9 million already spent on environmental studies) were completely deprogrammed from DRC, leaving it with an even larger funding gap than before the passage of RM2 in 2004.

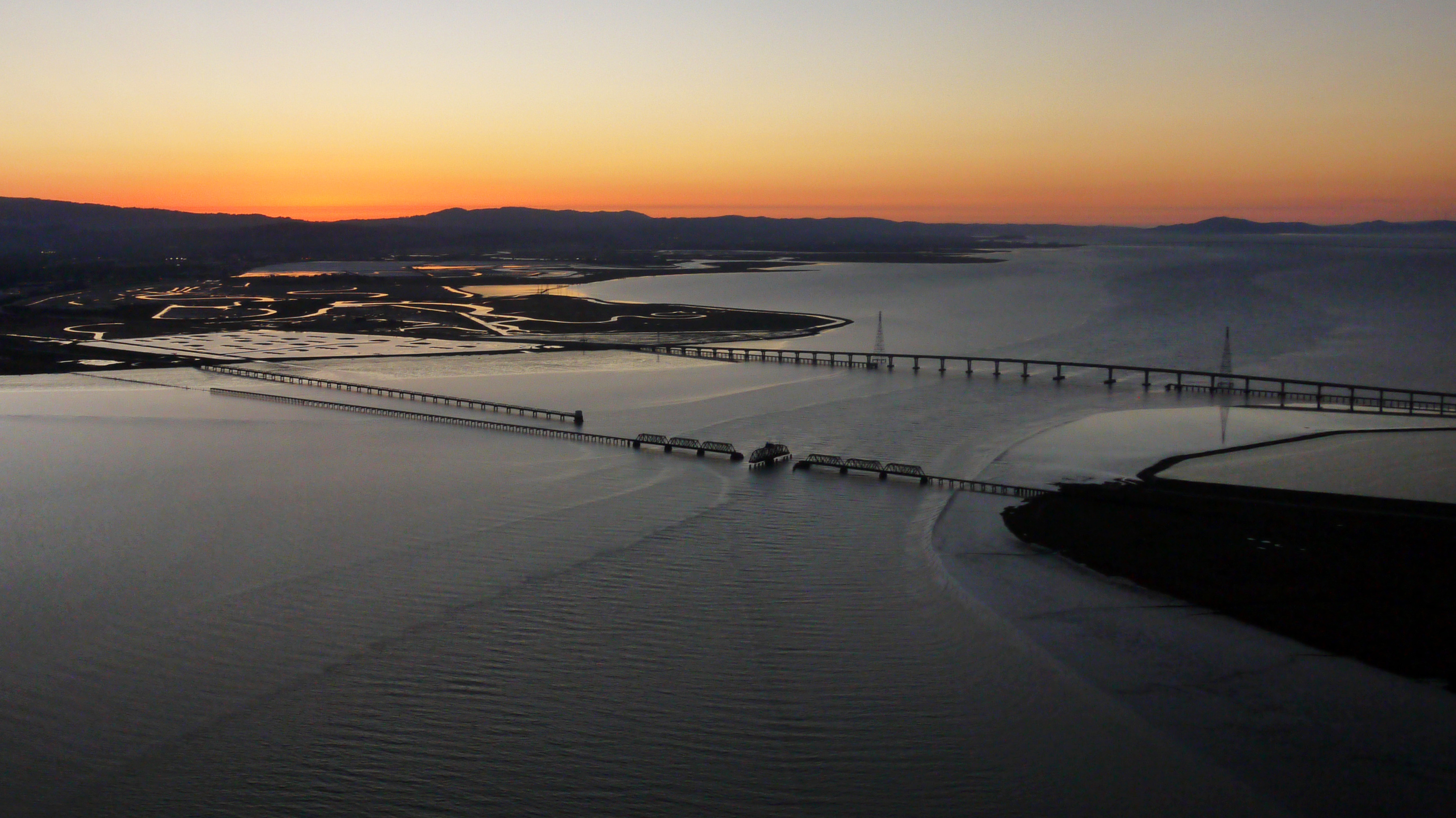
Aerial view (facing north) of Dumbarton Rail (foreground) and Road bridges (background), bracketing Hetch Hetchy pipelines 1 & 2 (2010)

=== 2012–2014: Alameda County Measures B1 and BB ===
The 2012 Alameda County ballot Measure B1 would have restored US$120,000,000 (equivalent to $168,300,000 in 2025) to the Dumbarton Rail Corridor project through a sales tax increase in Alameda County. Measure B1 failed to pass by a small margin, and a later study showed the measure's failure may have been due in part to the lack of a "sunset" clause for the expiration of the sales tax increase.

Two years later, Alameda County voters passed Measure BB, which was nearly identical in language to the 2012 Measure B1, with a few exceptions. Measure B1 now included a sunset clause and the money set aside for Dumbarton Rail was now directed towards improving bus service over the Dumbarton Bridge.

=== 2008–2016: Suspended ===
The loan (and eventual grant) of the majority of RM2 funds from DRC to WSX meant that construction would not start on DRC as scheduled. Although an administrative draft of the project draft environmental impact statement (DEIS) was completed in late 2009, the detailed engineering studies kept forecasting increased cost and decreased projected ridership. By 2010, the estimated cost of DRC had increased again to US$700,000,000 (equivalent to $1,033,500,000 in 2025). Besides the increased cost estimates, other issues had emerged, including negotiations with Union Pacific to reroute freight traffic onto the Niles subdivision and purchase of the Oakland subdivision for DRC service. In addition, the alignment of the proposed California High-Speed Rail service was still wavering between the Altamont Pass (which would route HSR over the Dumbarton Cut-off) and the Pacheco Pass (which would route HSR through San Jose up the Peninsula Corridor to San Francisco).

Recognizing these issues, the March 2011 Dumbarton Rail Corridor Alternatives Study (Wilbur Smith Associates) set out to redefine the project to increase cost-effectiveness and boost ridership. Several alternative service proposals were studied, including modified rail service and bus rapid transit schemes. One alternate rail service would have created a rail shuttle between Union City and the existing Redwood City Caltrain station, dropping the limited stop service to San Francisco or San Jose. The rail shuttle would run four departures per hour during the three peak hours in the morning and the three peak afternoon hours, increasing the number of trips from six to forty-eight. Capital costs would also increase, as more rolling stock was required.

An updated methodology for projecting ridership was also used in the 2011 Alternatives Study. Under the original methodology and routing, there were approximately 5,900 daily passengers anticipated to use DRC service by 2035. With the revised methodology, there were approximately 8,600 projected daily passengers in 2035 instead with the original route. The rail shuttle alternative would have increased this to 15,500 daily passengers in 2035. In comparison, the most optimistic bus rapid transit scheme projected 6,000 daily passengers in 2035 with the updated methodology.

The draft environmental impact report was completed in 2013. The Federal Transit Administration (FTA) declined to review it, since "reasonable funding sources" were not available, and the project was placed on indefinite hold. The DEIR was never released for public review and comment.

A proposal was advanced to create a "Phase I" service between the Redwood City Caltrain station and a new Willow Road Dumbarton Rail station. In the same meeting, the Alameda County Transportation Commission announced (in a letter from Scott Haggerty) that "For the new Measure BB funds identified for the Dumbarton Corridor Area Transportation Improvements, a rail project and/or activities to support a rail project cannot be funded with these funds," effectively ending Alameda County's participation in DRC.

=== 2016–2020: Facebook revival ===
In 2016, Facebook announced they were providing SMCTA with $1 million to study different methods to improve traffic over the Dumbarton corridor, both short and long-term, including traffic light timing, HOV lanes, and possible bus rapid transit over the old Dumbarton Rail Bridge. Facebook headquarters are within walking distance of the proposed Willow Road station and could be a potential source of new ridership that was not accounted in the prior studies.

The draft final report for the Dumbarton Transportation Corridor Study (DTCS) was released in August 2017. DTCS proposes a phased approach, with improvements to bus service (over the Dumbarton [Road] Bridge) to be implemented by 2020, diesel trains over the Dumbarton Rail Bridge to Union City by 2030, and finally electrification of the rail line by 2035, at a total estimated cost of $1.6 billion. This combined phasing contrasts with earlier DRC studies, which assumed that enhanced bus or rail service as mutually exclusive alternatives.

In August 2018, SamTrans partnered with Cross Bay Transit Partners (CBTP), a limited liability corporation formed by Facebook and the Plenary Group, to perform full environmental impact analyses and a fiscal impact analysis for the project or explore possible alternatives. The public-private partnership began an environmental review process in 2019. Four public meetings were held in February and March 2019 to publicize the partnership's efforts and to gather input on the proposed concepts. On the Peninsula, three rail stations have been proposed: the western terminus at the existing Redwood City station, Marsh station (in North Fair Oaks, near the intersection of Spring/15th and Bay/Florence), and Willow station (near Facebook headquarters, close to Willow Road and CA-84); in the East Bay, the proposed station is Newark with potential extensions to Union City (at the existing BART station) via Fremont-Centerville and a spur line to Ardenwood (near CA-84 and Ardenwood Road).

In 2019, Facebook proposed investing $1 billion for the project. The plan was for construction to begin as early as 2022 and finish by 2029.

On June 2, 2019, a brush fire that authorities suspected was arson spread to the wooden trestle on the eastern approach near the Newark Slough Bridge. Like the prior 1998 fire, firefighters had difficulty reaching the relatively remote location.

After the coronavirus pandemic came to the United States in 2020, the vast majority of Facebook staff began working virtually, and Facebook announced it was reassessing its commitment to the project. In 2020–2021, Facebook wound down their involvement. Considering financial difficulties encountered in 2022 for Meta (the rebranded parent company of Facebook), it is considered unlikely that they will return to the project. Commuter automobile traffic across the Dumbarton Highway Bridge had exceeded its pre-pandemic levels by September 2022, suggesting that a need remains in the area for more commuter options.
