= Berkeley Bowl =

Independent grocery store known for produce

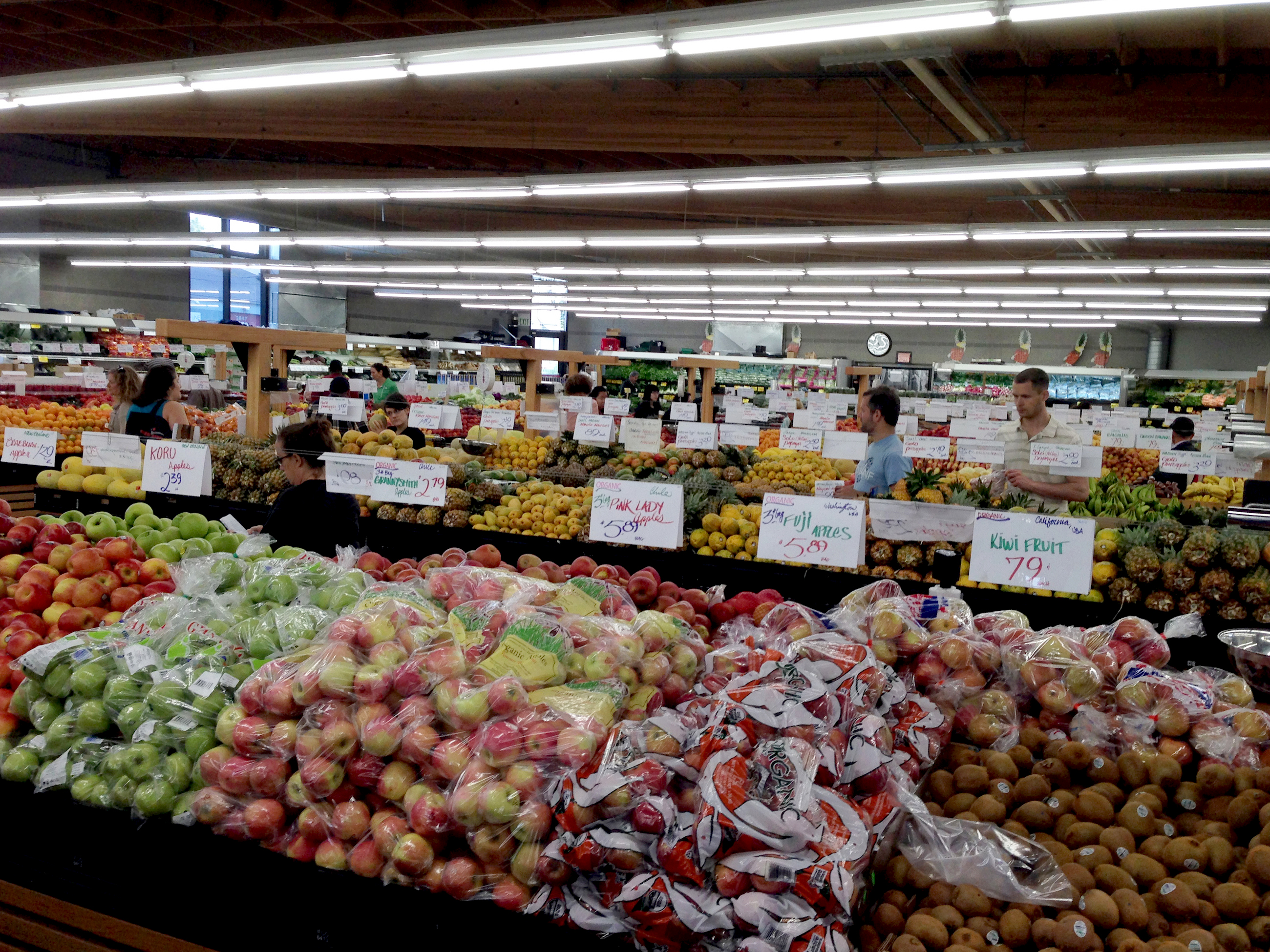
- The Berkeley Bowl produce section
- Industry: Grocery Store
- Founders: Glenn and Diane Yasuda
- Headquarters: Berkeley, California, United States
- Products: fruits and vegetables, groceries
- Website: Berkeley Bowl

Berkeley Bowl is an independent grocery store in Berkeley, California, United States. Founded by Glenn and Diane Yasuda, it sells organic and natural products and is known for its extensive produce section. In 2008, the Los Angeles Times wrote that it was "[Berkeley]'s most popular grocery store" and "one of the nation's most renowned retailers of exotic fruits and vegetables." It has two locations in the city.

The business name is a reference to the former bowling alley that became the store's first location.

== History ==
In 1977, Glenn and Diane Yasuda opened a small neighborhood market in a converted building that formerly housed a bowling alley at 2777 Shattuck Avenue. At the time, Glenn was teaching business education at a local college. By the late 1990s, the business had outgrown the building, and in 1999 it renovated and moved to a former Safeway supermarket, at 2020 Oregon Street.

In 2002, labor organizers pushed to unionize the store's 250 employees. Unionizing employees accused the store of intimidation, unfair treatment, low wages and benefits, and more. In 2004, after a series of disputes, the National Labor Relations Board accused the company of "pervasive and serious" labor issues that prevented a fair election. The company reached a settlement that year, recognizing the United Food and Commercial Workers as representatives of Berkeley Bowl workers, and paying but not reinstating two employees who claimed that they were unfairly fired.

In 2008 John Glionna, a staff writer for the Los Angeles Times, wrote an article with some negative comments about the store. In response, Glionna was banned for life from the business.

In 2009, the business opened a second location, Berkeley Bowl West. In 2010, the union was decertified after an employee vote. In 2011, the union was granted a re-run of the election after submitting charges of unfair labor practices to the National Labor Relations Board.

In 2018, The Berkeley Bowl Cookbook: Recipes Inspired by the Extraordinary Produce of California’s Most Iconic Market, a cookbook written by food blogger Laura McLively, was published. McLively had already started blogging about how they were using their Berkeley Bowl purchases in 2014 before writing and publishing the cookbook with the company's approval.

In 2020, Glenn Yasuda died at the age of 85. Yasuda’s son, Gen, took over the running of the two stores in Berkeley.
