= South Hayward station =

Metro station in Hayward, California, US

South Hayward
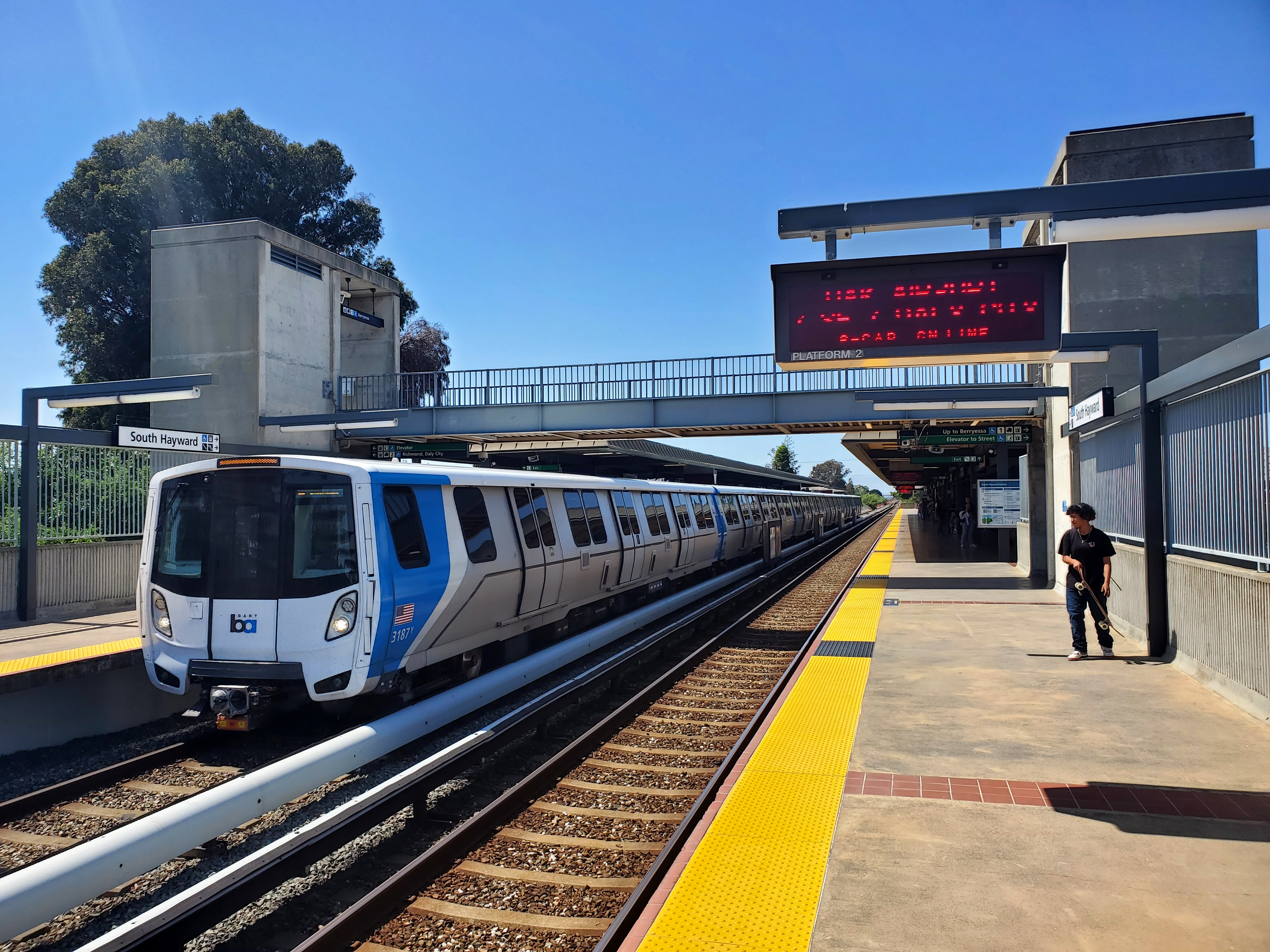
- An Orange Line train at the station in May 2024

General information
- Location: 28601 Dixon Street; Hayward, California
- Coordinates: 37.634362°N 122.057172°W
- Line: BART A-Line
- Platforms: 2 side platforms
- Connections: AC Transit: 9, 41, 60, 86, 801

Construction
- Structure type: Elevated
- Parking: 1,207 spaces
- Cycle facilities: 30 lockers
- Accessible: Yes
- Architect: Kitchen & Hunt

Other information
- Station code: BART: SHAY

History
- Opened: September 11, 1972

Passengers
- 2025: 1,491 (weekday average)

Services
Preceding station	Bay Area Rapid Transit	Following station
Hayward toward Daly City	Green Line	Union City toward Berryessa
Hayward toward Richmond	Orange Line	Union City toward Berryessa
Location

South Hayward station is a Bay Area Rapid Transit (BART) station located off the Tennyson Road arterial in Hayward, California. It is served by the Orange and Green lines.

== History ==
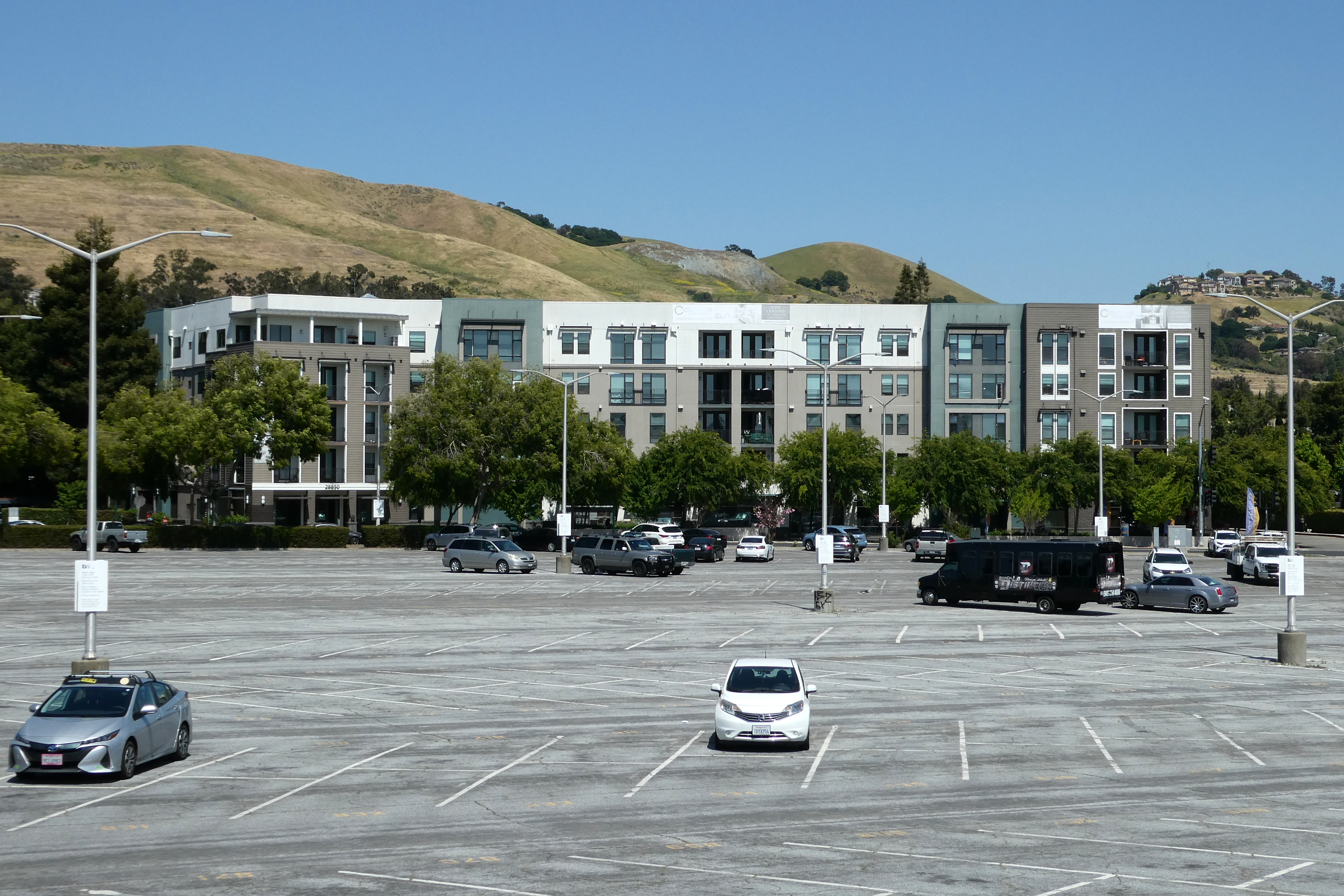
The 2017-completed adjacent development

The BART Board approved the name "South Hayward" in December 1965. The station opened as part of the first segment of the BART system on September 11, 1972. Due to a national strike that year by elevator constructors, elevator construction on the early stations was delayed. Elevators at most of the initial stations, including South Hayward, were completed in the months following the opening.

Construction of transit oriented development near the station began in 2015. Two buildings with a total of 357 residential units opened in 2017. As of 2024, BART anticipates soliciting a developer between 2029 and 2033 for a second phase of TOD.
