= Union City station =

Metro station in Union City, California, US

Union City
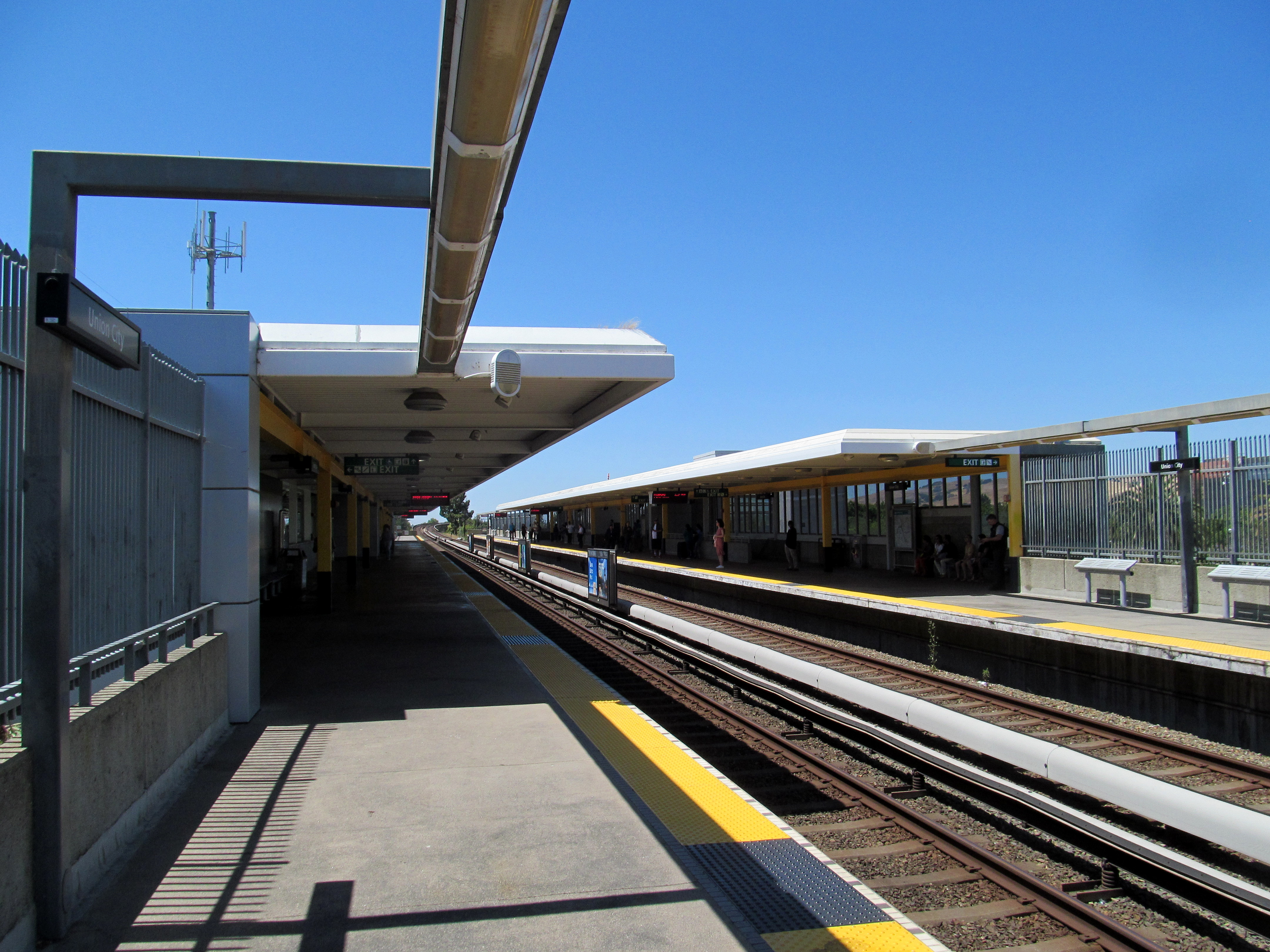
- Union City station platforms in 2017

General information
- Location: 10 Union Square; Union City, California
- Coordinates: 37.590746°N 122.017282°W
- Line: BART A-Line
- Platforms: 2 side platforms
- Connections: AC Transit: 97, 99, 200, 216, 232, 275 Flex, 801; Dumbarton Express: DB, DB1; Union City Transit: 1, 2, 3, 4, 5, 6, 7, 8, 9

Construction
- Structure type: Elevated
- Parking: 1,197 spaces
- Cycle facilities: 20 BikeLink lockers
- Accessible: Yes
- Architect: Kitchen & Hunt

Other information
- Station code: BART: UCTY

History
- Opened: September 11, 1972
- Rebuilt: February 12, 2014

Passengers
- 2025: 1,913 (weekday average)

Services
Preceding station	Bay Area Rapid Transit	Following station
South Hayward toward Daly City	Green Line	Fremont toward Berryessa
South Hayward toward Richmond	Orange Line	Fremont toward Berryessa

Proposed services (2030)
Preceding station	Altamont Corridor Express	Following station
Terminus	Union City – Merced	Pleasanton toward Merced
Terminus	Union City – Natomas	Pleasanton toward Natomas
Location

Union City station is a Bay Area Rapid Transit (BART) station in Union City, California. The station sits near Decoto Road east of Alvarado-Niles Road, directly behind the James Logan High School campus. The station is served by the Orange and Green lines. Local bus service is provided by Union City Transit and AC Transit.

== History ==
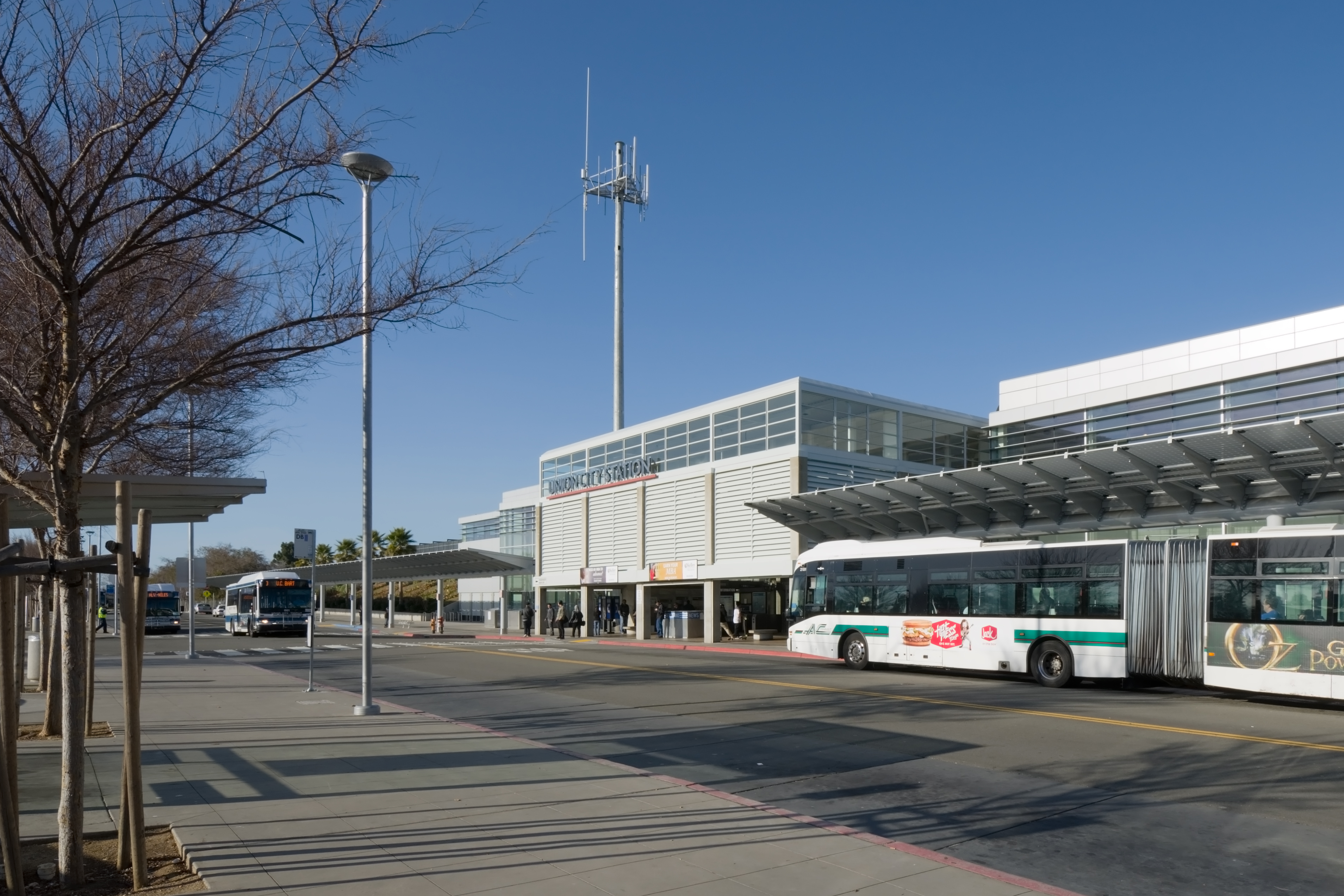
Main entrance and bus bays in 2013

The Western Pacific Railroad (WP) opened through Decoto in 1909. Passenger service began on August 22, 1910; both of the two daily round trips stopped at Decoto. A local train timed for commuting to Oakland and San Francisco was added on October 1. The commuter train was discontinued in 1914, leaving just two daily round trips. One of the two daily round trips ceased stopping at Decoto and other local stations in January 1919. The WP reduced service on the line to one daily train (the Scenic Limited) during the 1930s, but added the Exposition Flyer in 1939. Decoto continued to be a flag stop served by the daily Feather River Express until around 1942.

BART built its Fremont line using the Western Pacific alignment (Oakland Subdivision), with a station south of the former WP station site. The BART Board approved the name "Union City" for the station in December 1965. Service at the station began on September 11, 1972. Due to a national strike that year by elevator constructors, elevator construction on the early stations was delayed. Elevators at most of the initial stations, including Union City, were completed in the months following the opening. The fare lobby features tile mosaics designed by Jean Varda and constructed by Alfonso Pardiñas. The station was not originally served by buses. "The Flea" (now Union City Transit) began operating in Union City in 1974. AC Transit service was expanded to Fremont in November 1974, and to Newark that December, with some routes serving Union City station. AC Transit began operating service between Union City station and Palo Alto station over the Dumbarton Bridge – later branded Dumbarton Express – on September 10, 1984.

As built, the station only had access from Union Way. In 2008, construction started on a reconfiguration of the parking lots, which included a new station roadway connecting to Decoto Road. The work was intended to improve access to the station, particularly from new development on the east side of the tracks. A commuter rail platform for existing Capitol Corridor service and the proposed Dumbarton Rail Corridor was also proposed in 2008. (Later plans have called for the Capitol Corridor to be rerouted over the Coast Line to the west, which would not permit a Union City stop). The parking lot and roadway work was completed in March 2012, with buses using new stops adjacent to the station entrance.

The next round of changes to the station were made in anticipation of a future entrance on the east side of the station. This would allow direct access from transit-oriented development (TOD) of former industrial sites east of the station. An expanded ground-level fare lobby with provisions for future pedestrian pass-through outside the paid area was completed in 2017. That year, the California Public Utilities Commission approved plans for an at-grade pedestrian crossing of the Union Pacific Railroad Oakland Subdivision in lieu of a more expensive grade-separated crossing. Construction work on Phase 2A, which added two new escalators to the east (northbound) BART platform, took place from 2019 to December 2022. As of October 2023, construction on the pedestrian crossing is expected to be complete by 2025. As of 2024, BART anticipates soliciting a developer between 2029 and 2033 for TOD to replace existing surface parking lots at the station.

Some Altamont Corridor Express (ACE) services are planned to be expanded to Union City, with a new platform on the Oakland Subdivision adjacent to the BART station. Three daily ACE round-trips are proposed to serve the station by 2030: two Union City–Merced round trips and one Union City–Natomas round trip.
