= MV Transportation =

Passenger transport company in the United States

MV Transportation, Inc.
- Founded: 1975
- Headquarters: Dallas, Texas, US
- Service area: United States and Canada
- Service type: Transit bus, paratransit, shuttle, school bus
- Website: mvtransit.com

MV Transportation, Inc., based in Dallas, Texas, is the largest privately owned passenger transportation contracting services firm in the United States. The company provides paratransit, fixed-route, campus and corporate shuttles, and student transportation services, partnering with over 200 city and county government transit agencies, school districts, universities, and corporations. MV serves over 110 million passengers each year across 30 states and Canada with a team of more than 20,000 transit professionals.

== History ==
MV Transportation, Inc. was founded in 1975 in San Francisco, California, by Alex and Feysan Lodde, who continue to own the company. The Loddes realized the limited transportation options for the elderly and people with disabilities and began providing transportation services throughout the city. By 1990, the landmark Americans with Disabilities Act was passed, mandating comparable transportation for passengers with disabilities.

Since that time MV has grown, now generating over $1.3B in 2022 annual revenues and representing more than 200 public transit agencies and private companies in performing their passenger transportation service in both the U.S. and Canada. It is the largest privately owned transportation company in North America, providing paratransit, fixed route, shuttle and school transportation services. .

=== Company milestones ===
- 1978: incorporated in the state of California as MediVan
- 1984: the company won its first government contract
- 1990: name changed from MediVan to MV Transportation, Inc.
- 2001: MV won its first contract outside of its home state, California
- 2004: MV is named one of America's fastest growing companies by Inc. Magazine
- 2004: MV debuted on Black Enterprise Magazine's B.E. 100 list as the 16th largest Black-owned company in the United States
- 2004: MV was awarded Microsoft's employee shuttle contract
- 2005: MV was awarded $500+ million contract in Washington D.C., largest in company history
- 2008: MV won the TransLink paratransit contract in Vancouver, British Columbia, the company's first contract outside the United States.
- 2010: MV Transportation was celebrated by client, Bechtel Corporation for its work at Motiva Refinery in Port Arthur, Texas. The MV division drove one million miles and carried one million passengers at the site.
- 2012: MV Transportation relocated its global headquarters from Fairfield, California, to Dallas, Texas.

== Transit operations ==
- Anchor-Rides, Anchorage, AK
- Anchorage School District Anchorage, AK
- Austin, Texas, Capital Metro (MetroAccess)
- Antelope Valley Transit Authority
- Barrie Transit (Ontario, Canada)
- Barstow Area Transit
- Burbank Bus
- Butler Transit Authority
- Commute.org
- Cape Cod Regional Transit Authority
- City of Santa Clarita Transit
- Coastside Beach Shuttle, Half Moon Bay, CA
- Compton Renaissance Transit
- Dumbarton Express
- Durham Area Transit Authority
- Detroit Department of Transportation
- E-tran
- Emery Go-Round
- Foothill Transit
- Fresno Area Express (Contractor for Paratransit Operations)
- Glendale Beeline
- GoCary
- Hanford, CA KART
- Indianapolis Public Transportation Corporation (Contractor for Paratransit Operations)
- Los Angeles County Metropolitan Transportation Authority Los Angeles, CA
- LADOT (Los Angeles)
- Lawrence Transit
- Lawrence Berkeley National Laboratory
- Marin Transit
  - Contractor for West Marin Stagecoach
- MTA Maryland
- Mid-Mon Valley Transit Authority
- Monterey Park Spirit Bus
- Monterey-Salinas Transit
  - Contractor for paratransit, minibus, and tourist-trolley routes
- NYC MTA (Subcontractor for Access-A-Ride program in Brooklyn, Staten Island and Harlem)
- Orange County Transportation Authority (ACCESS Only)
- Pueblo Transit CitiLift
- Petaluma Transit
- Putnam Transit
- RTC Transit Simmons "Lot A" Yard
- Roseville Transit
- Regional Transportation Commission of Washoe County
  - Contractor for RTC RIDE buses in Reno and Sparks NV.
- SamTrans
  - Contractor for San Francisco Services, Paratransit Operations and Route SKY
- San Benito County Transit
- Santa Clarita Transit
- San Joaquin RTD County Services
- Santa Maria Area Transit
- Santa Rosa CityBus
  - Contractor for Santa Rosa Paratransit
- SEPTA CCT Connect (Philadelphia County)
- South Coast British Columbia Transportation Authority (TransLink)
- St. John's, Newfoundland
- Thousand Oaks Transit
- TCaT (Tulare County Area Transit)
- Tulare Intermodal Express (TIME) Tulare, CA
- West Hollywood CityLine
- Union City Transit
- Valley Metro
  - Contractor for Phoenix Dial-A-Ride
- Valley Regional Transit
- WestCAT (Western Contra Costa County Transit)
- WHEELS (California)
