= Union City Transit =

Public transit service in Union City, California, US

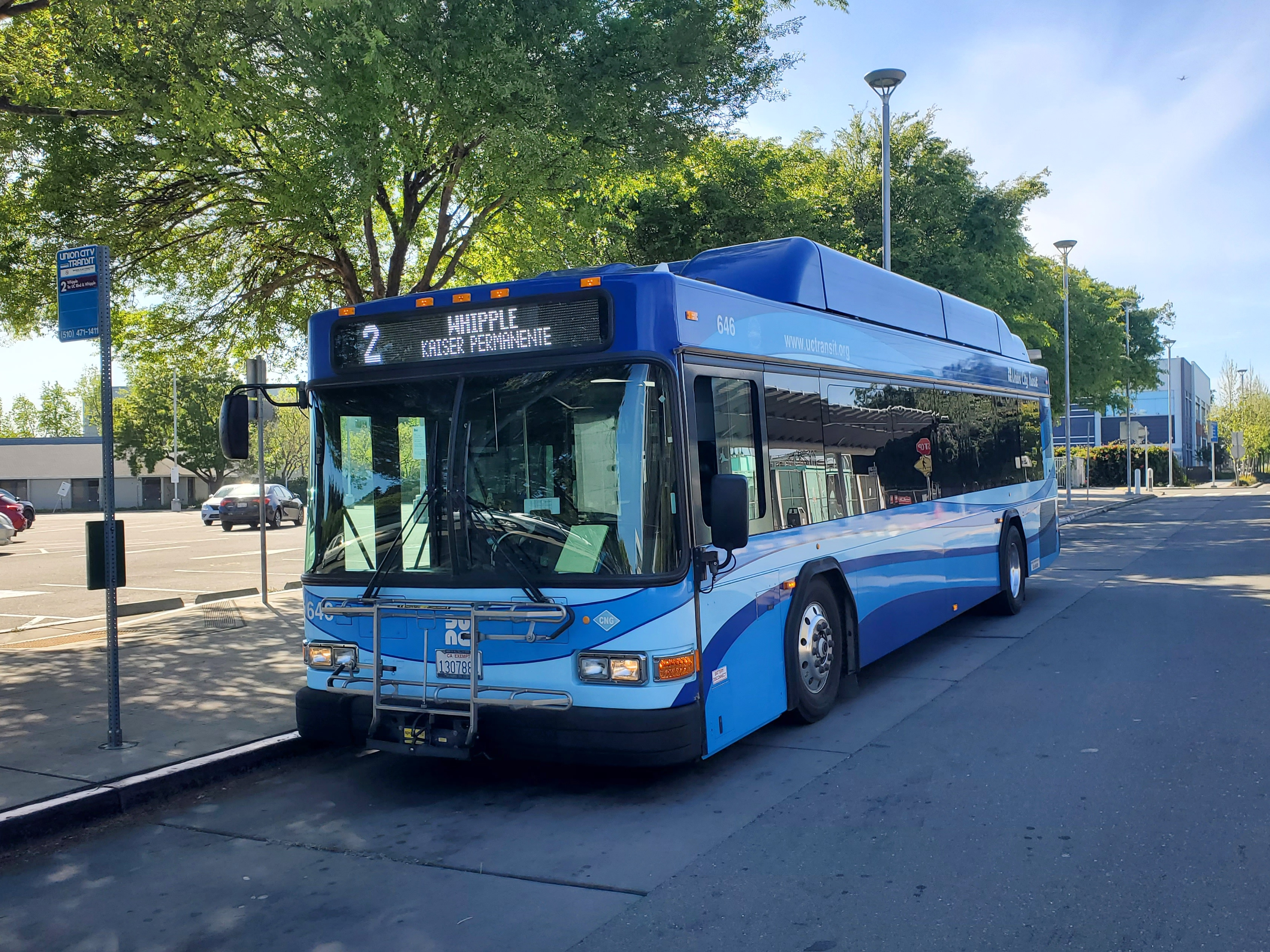
- Union City Transit bus at Union City station
- Founded: 1974
- Headquarters: 34650 Seventh Street
- Locale: Union City, California
- Service type: bus service, paratransit
- Routes: 5
- Hubs: Union City station, Union Landing
- Annual ridership: 259,096
- Fuel type: CNG
- Operator: MV Transportation
- Website: uctransit.org

Union City Transit is a public transit service in Union City, California, in the San Francisco Bay Area. Union City Transit operates five local bus lines, with hubs at Union City station and the Union Landing shopping center. The service had an annual ridership of 289,542 in 2024.

Local bus service in Union City began in 1974 as "The Flea". It was originally operated by Patterson Transit, which was renamed Union City Transit in 1975. Another operator took over in 1982, but the bus service kept the name Union City Transit. Due to the COVID-19 pandemic, Union City Transit was reduced from eight routes to five in March 2021. The name "Flea" was revived for a demand responsive transit service added in September 2023.
