= Emeryville Public Market =

International food hall

Coordinates: 37°50′28″N 122°17′37″W

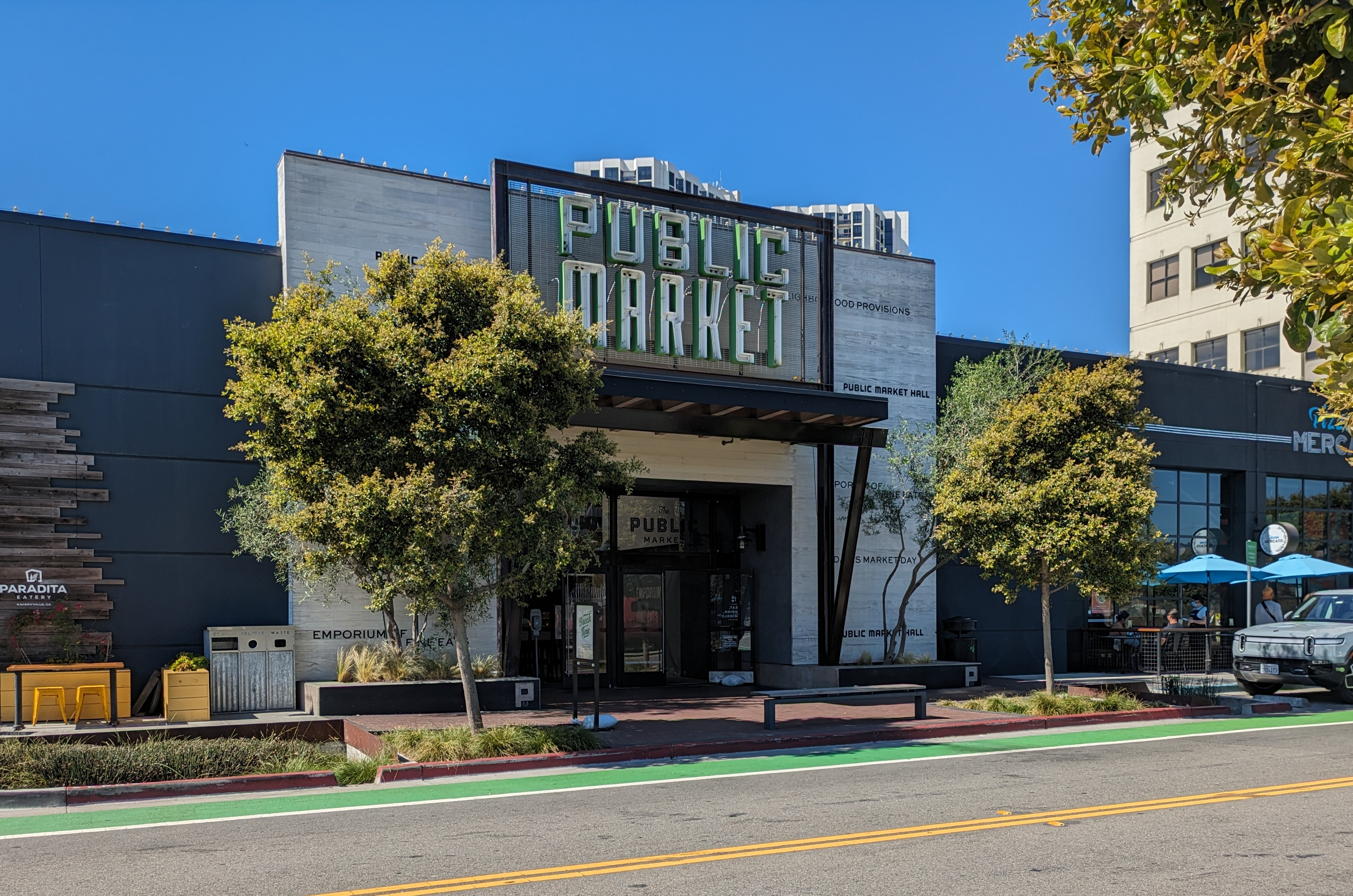
Emeryville Public Market

The Emeryville Public Market is an international food hall located in Emeryville, California

== History ==
The public market opened in the late 1980s during Emeryville's massive transformation from industrial wasteland to retail, art, educational, dense residential, and research and development hub. Situated at 5959 Shellmound street alongside Christie Park the public market featured 17 restaurants, a dentist, gym, nail salon, a Guitar Center, and Urban Outfitters store. Super Duper Burger, a local San Francisco Bay Area chain, became the market's 18th eatery in 2018. A downside to the market was identified in that of the empty grocery store venue and the abandonment of development of "parcel B" by CCRP which would have added more retail space and a parking structure that will now be a simple surface lot. The plan was met with debate at the city council level. Reasons for abandoning the project ranged from an impending retail apocalypse, sky high construction costs, and the immigration and tariff policies of the Trump administration according to the Evilleeye, a local news outlet.
