= Ardenwood Park & Ride =

Bus station in Fremont, California, United States

Ardenwood
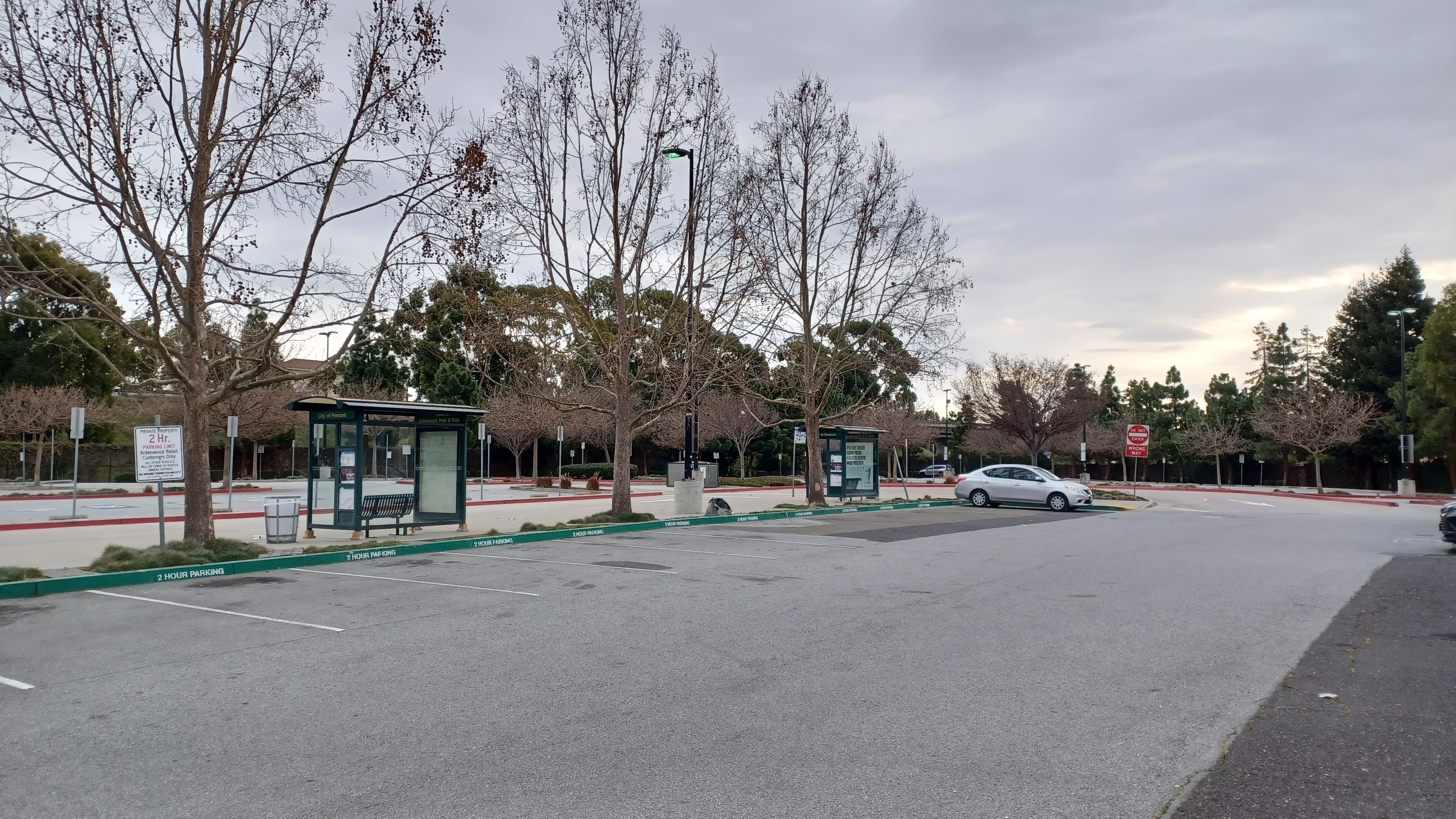
- Ardenwood Park & Ride

General information
- Location: 34805 Ardenwood Boulevard; Fremont, California
- Coordinates: 37.551399°N 122.054841°W
- Bus routes: AC Transit U, SB, 232; Dumbarton Express DB, DB1

Construction
- Parking: 351 spaces
- Cycle facilities: 2 lockers

History
- Rebuilt: August 2009

Proposed services
Preceding station	Amtrak	Following station
Oakland Coliseum toward Auburn	Capitol Corridor	Santa Clara–Great America toward San Jose
Location

Ardenwood is a park and ride bus station in Fremont, California. It is located off California State Route 84, adjacent to the Ardenwood Historic Farm. It is served by AC Transit and Dumbarton Express transbay buses.

An expanded bus shelter opened in August 2009 at a cost of $8.3 million and was frequently filled within months of opening. A new parking lot had opened prior in June, bringing the total number of spaces to 351. A railway platform is proposed to be constructed along the bordering Union Pacific Railroad Coast Line to serve the rerouted Capitol Corridor in 2026. Such a station was previously proposed in 1990, when the service was being planned.
