= Orange Line (VTA) =

Light rail line in Santa Clara County, California

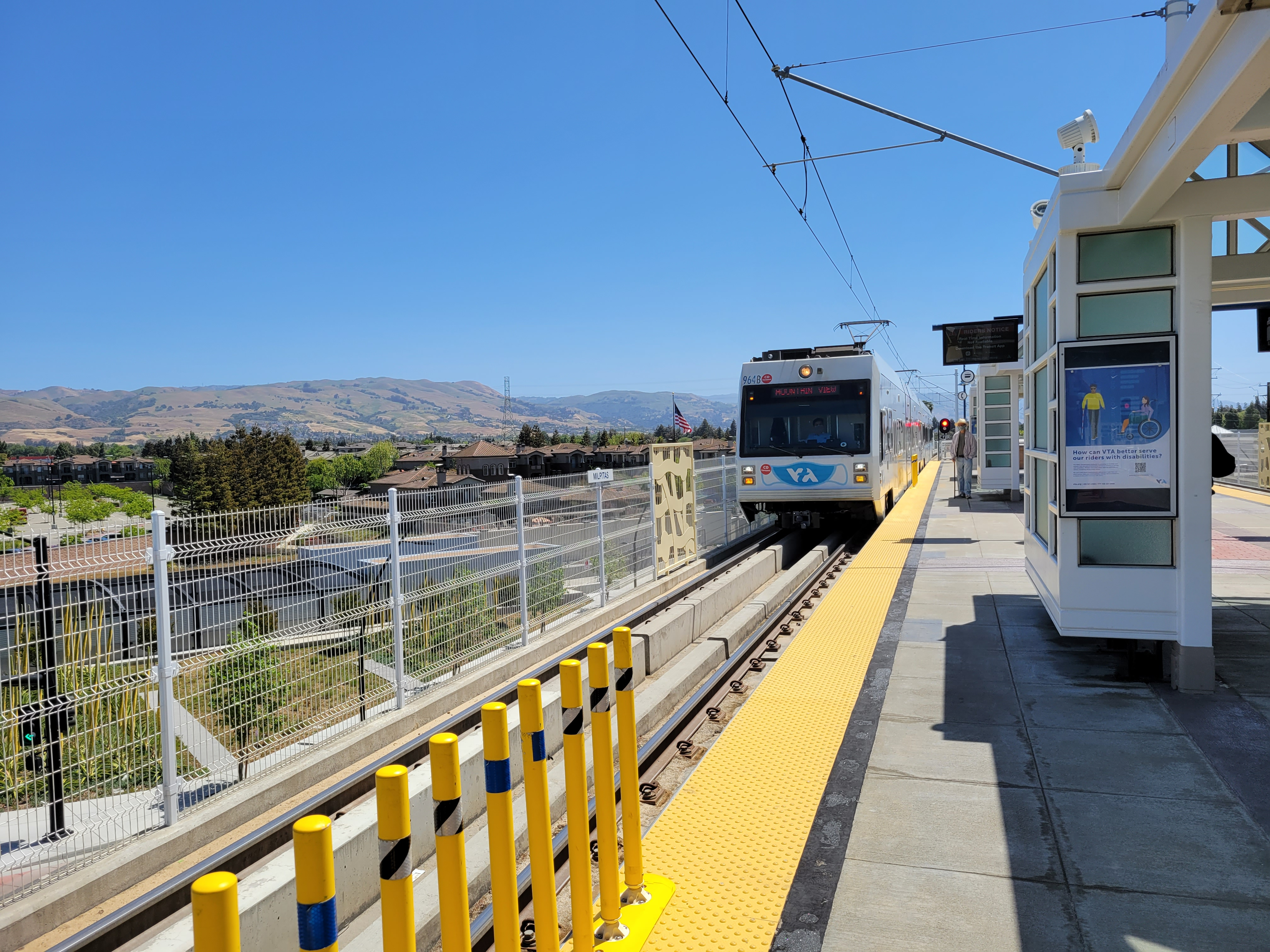
- A VTA light rail train at Milpitas station

Overview
- Locale: Santa Clara County, California; Cities: Mountain View, Sunnyvale, Santa Clara, San Jose, and Milpitas
- Termini: Mountain View; Alum Rock
- Stations: 26

Service
- Type: Light rail
- System: VTA light rail
- Operator(s): Valley Transportation Authority
- Rolling stock: Kinki Sharyo LRV

Technical
- Line length: 15.8 mi (25.4 km)
- Track gauge: 4 ft 8 1/2 in (1,435 mm) standard gauge
- Electrification: Overhead line, 750 V DC
Route map
Orange Line highlighted in orange

The Orange Line is a light rail line in Santa Clara County, California, and part of the VTA light rail system. It serves 26 stations in the cities of Mountain View, Sunnyvale, Santa Clara, Milpitas, and San Jose, traveling between Mountain View and Alum Rock stations, stopping at Ames Research Center, Great America, and Levi's Stadium along the way. The line connects to Caltrain at Mountain View and to the Bay Area Rapid Transit (BART) system at Milpitas station. The line runs for 20 hours per day on weekdays, with headways of 15 minutes for most of the day. On weekends, the train runs at 20-minute headways for most of the day. After around 8 pm on weekdays and weekends trains run at 30-minute headways.

== Route description ==
From west to east, the Orange Line starts from Mountain View station, travels northeast, passing under U.S. Route 101 at Ellis Street, following Mathilda Avenue to Java Drive, briefly travels south crossing State Route 237 and turning east on Tasman Drive, traveling through Sunnyvale, Santa Clara, and North San Jose. Tasman Drive becomes Great Mall Parkway in Milpitas and eventually becomes Capitol Avenue in East San Jose. For the rest of the trip, the line follows Great Mall Parkway and Capitol Avenue until it reaches its eastern terminus at Alum Rock station.

== Construction history ==
The route that the Orange Line now runs on was constructed through three different expansion projects: the original Guadalupe line, the Tasman West extension, and the Tasman East extension.

=== Guadalupe line ===
The trackway between Old Ironsides station and First Street is part of the Guadalupe line, the first light rail line constructed in Santa Clara county. The Guadalupe line opened for revenue service on December 10, 1987, originally running from Old Ironsides station to Civic Center station in San Jose. Champion station was not part of the original line; it was added as intermediate stop as part of the Tasman West project.

=== Tasman West extension ===
The Tasman West extension project was constructed with funds from the 1996 Measure B sales tax measure. Champion station was the first to open as an infill stop along the existing Guadalupe line trackway, opening March 24, 1997. On December 17, 1999, 7.6 miles (12.2 km) of trackway and 12 new light rail stations added between the existing Old Ironsides station and the new Mountain View station. On the same day, Baypointe station opened just east of the intersection of 1st and Tasman.

=== Tasman East/Capitol extension ===
The first phase of the Tasman East extension opened in May 2001 between Baypointe and Alder stations.

On June 24, 2004, the 8.3-mile (13.4-km) Tasman East/Capitol extension was opened, incorporating 8 new stations. This extension runs from Alder station east along the Great Mall Parkway in Milpitas, then into East San Jose on Capitol Avenue to Alum Rock Transit Center on Alum Rock Avenue. This extension brings service to the Great Mall of the Bay Area in Milpitas. The total cost of this extension was $432.9 million.

=== Light Rail Efficiency Project ===
In 2014, a new storage track and crossover was constructed between Old Ironsides and Reamwood as part of improvements to support events at Levi's Stadium and the future Silicon Valley BART extension.

To provide better headways and service reliability, a second track was constructed between Whisman and Mountain View. Work began in summer 2014 and was completed in late 2015. Evelyn Station was permanently closed in mid-March 2015 as part of track construction.

=== 2019 reconfiguration ===
Ahead of the opening of the Silicon Valley BART extension to Milpitas station and Berryessa/North San José, the Orange Line was created. Starting in early 2019, station signage was changed reflect the new configuration, displaying line colors rather than terminus icons.

== Station stops ==
Station	Transfer to
Mountain View	Caltrain: Express, Local, Limited, Weekend Local; VTA Bus: 21, 40, 51, 52; MV Community Shuttle: Grey, Red; MVgo: A, B, C, D; Park and ride
Evelyn	Closed in 2015
Whisman	Park and ride
Middlefield	VTA Bus: 21; MVgo: A
Bayshore/NASA	
Moffett Park	Park and ride
Lockheed Martin	VTA Bus: 56, Rapid 523; ACE Shuttle: Red
Borregas	VTA Bus: 56; ACE Shuttle: Red
Crossman	VTA Bus: 56; ACE Shuttle: Red
Fair Oaks	VTA Bus: 56
Vienna	
Reamwood	VTA Bus: 55
Old Ironsides	Green Line; VTA Bus: 55, 57, 59
Great America	Green Line
Lick Mill	Green Line; Altamont Corridor Express (at Great America); Capitol Corridor (at Great America)
Champion	Green Line; ACE Shuttle: Brown, Purple
Baypointe	Blue Line; VTA Bus: 59; ACE Shuttle: Brown, Purple
Cisco Way	ACE Shuttle: Purple
Alder	VTA Bus: 47; ACE Shuttle: Purple; Park and ride
Great Mall	VTA Bus: 66; Park and ride
Milpitas	BART: VTA Bus: 20, 47, 60, 66, 70, 71, 77, Express 104; AC Transit: 231; Park and ride
Cropley	
Hostetter	VTA Bus: 70; Park and ride
Berryessa	VTA Bus: 61
Penitencia Creek	Park and ride
McKee	VTA Bus: 64A, 64B
Alum Rock	VTA Bus: 23, 25, Rapid 522; Park and ride

== Capitol Expressway extension ==
Proposed stations for Capitol Expressway Light Rail Extension
- Existing stations
- Stations under construction
- Proposed new stations
- Proposed infill station
1 Alum Rock
2 Story
3 Ocala/Cunningham
4 Eastridge Transit Center
5 Nieman
6 Silver Creek
7 McLaughlin
8 Senter
9 Monterey (transfer to Caltrain Capitol station)
10 Vista Park
11 Capitol

VTA has proposed a future extension to this line which would extend the line 2.4 miles (3.9 km) south along the median of the Capitol Expressway from its current eastern terminus at the Alum Rock Transit Center to the Eastridge Transit Center with one intermediate stop at Story Road. The project has been under study since the early 2000s and is part of a larger project to transform the Capitol Expressway into a major transit corridor. The Eastridge Transit Center, which was completed in 2015, was designed to accommodate a future light rail station. Bus Rapid Transit stations were also added along Capitol Expressway in 2017 for the Rapid 522 route which parallels this corridor. The extension will have elevated crossings at Capitol Avenue, Story Road, and Tully Road. Major construction is expected to begin in Fall 2021 and projected to be complete in Summer 2026. The $468 million project will be primarily funded by local sales taxes.

An earlier version of the project also included a station at Ocala, but it was eliminated in 2014. However, Ocala is served by a Bus Rapid Transit station along the parallel Rapid 522 route.

The final approved and funded project is a small portion of a much more ambitious project studied in 2005 that would have extended the line in a hook shape, along the Capitol Expressway, past the Caltrain Capitol station to connect with the Blue Line's Capitol Station at Route 87. As seen in the map, the originally proposed extension would have also included stations at Nieman Boulevard, McLaughlin Avenue, Senter Road, Monterey Road, and Vista Park Drive, with potential infill station at Silver Creek Road.
