= McKee station =

VTA light rail station in San Jose, California

McKee
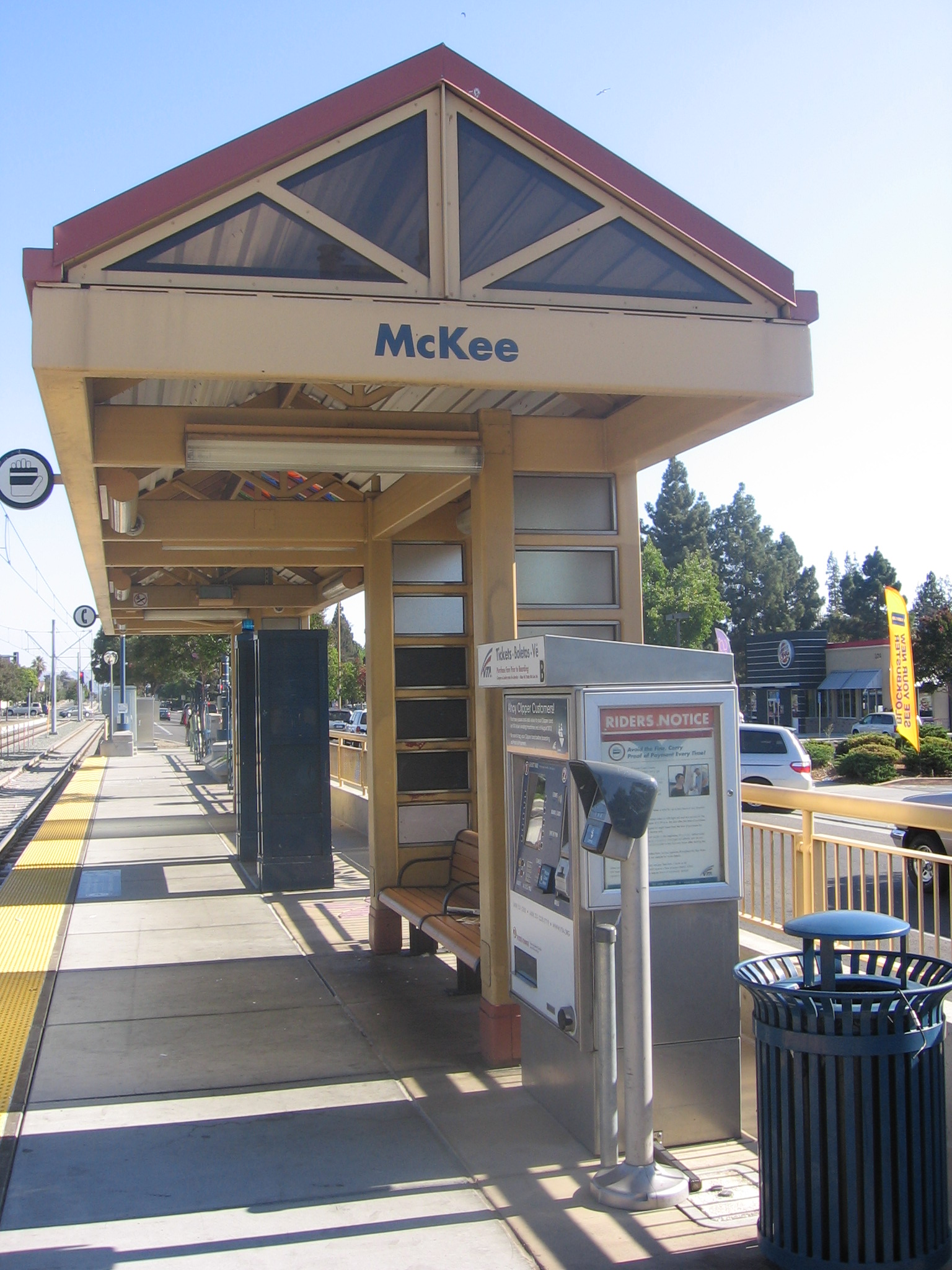
- McKee station platform, 2012

General information
- Location: Capitol Avenue and McKee Road; San Jose, California
- Coordinates: 37°22′15″N 121°50′38″W
- Owner: Santa Clara Valley Transportation Authority
- Line: Tasman East/Capitol
- Platforms: 2 side platforms
- Tracks: 2
- Connections: VTA Bus: 64A, 64B

Construction
- Structure type: At-grade
- Accessible: Yes

History
- Opened: June 24, 2004; 22 years ago

Services
Preceding station	VTA	Following station
Penitencia Creek toward Mountain View	Orange Line	Alum Rock Terminus
Location

McKee station is a light rail station operated by Santa Clara Valley Transportation Authority (VTA), located in the median of North Capitol Avenue, just north of McKee Road in San Jose, California. This station is served by VTA's Orange Line.

The station was opened on June 24, 2004, as part of VTA's Capitol light rail extension.
