= Champion station =

VTA light rail station in San Jose, California

Champion
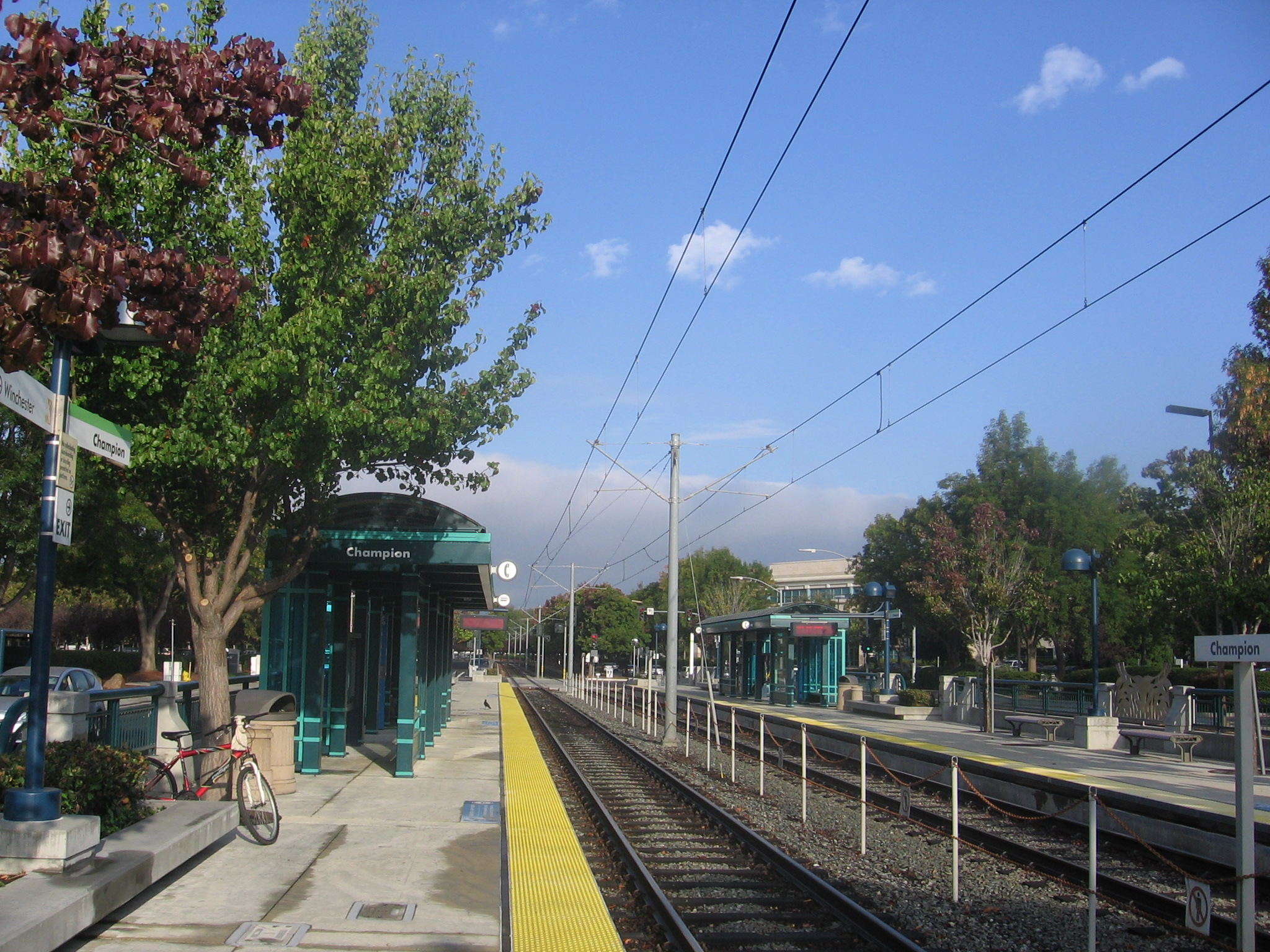
- Champion station platform in 2012

General information
- Location: 175 Tasman Drive; San Jose, California
- Coordinates: 37°24′33″N 121°57′08″W
- Owner: Santa Clara Valley Transportation Authority
- Platforms: 2 side platforms
- Tracks: 2
- Connections: ACE Shuttle: Brown, Purple

Construction
- Structure type: At-grade
- Accessible: Yes

History
- Opened: March 24, 1997; 29 years ago

Services
Preceding station	VTA	Following station
Lick Mill toward Old Ironsides	Green Line	Tasman toward Winchester
Lick Mill toward Mountain View	Orange Line	Baypointe toward Alum Rock
Location

Champion station is an at-grade light rail station on the Green Line and the Orange Line of the VTA light rail system. The station is located in the center median of Tasman Drive just east of its intersection with Champion Court, after which the station is named. This station is the furthest east on the section of track shared by the Green and Orange lines.

Champion was built as part of the Tasman West extension project as an infill station on the original Guadeloupe Corridor. The station opened on March 24, 1997, a couple of years before the rest of the Tasman West stations.

== Station artwork ==
The station features public artworks, including the sculpture EcoTech completed in 1997 by eco-artist Deborah Kennedy for the city of San Jose. The station is decorated with a number of icons commonly used to depict routers, switches and other networking devices on network maps as a nod to Cisco Systems, whose San Jose campus surrounds the station.
