= Deborah Kennedy (artist) =

American author, educator and artist

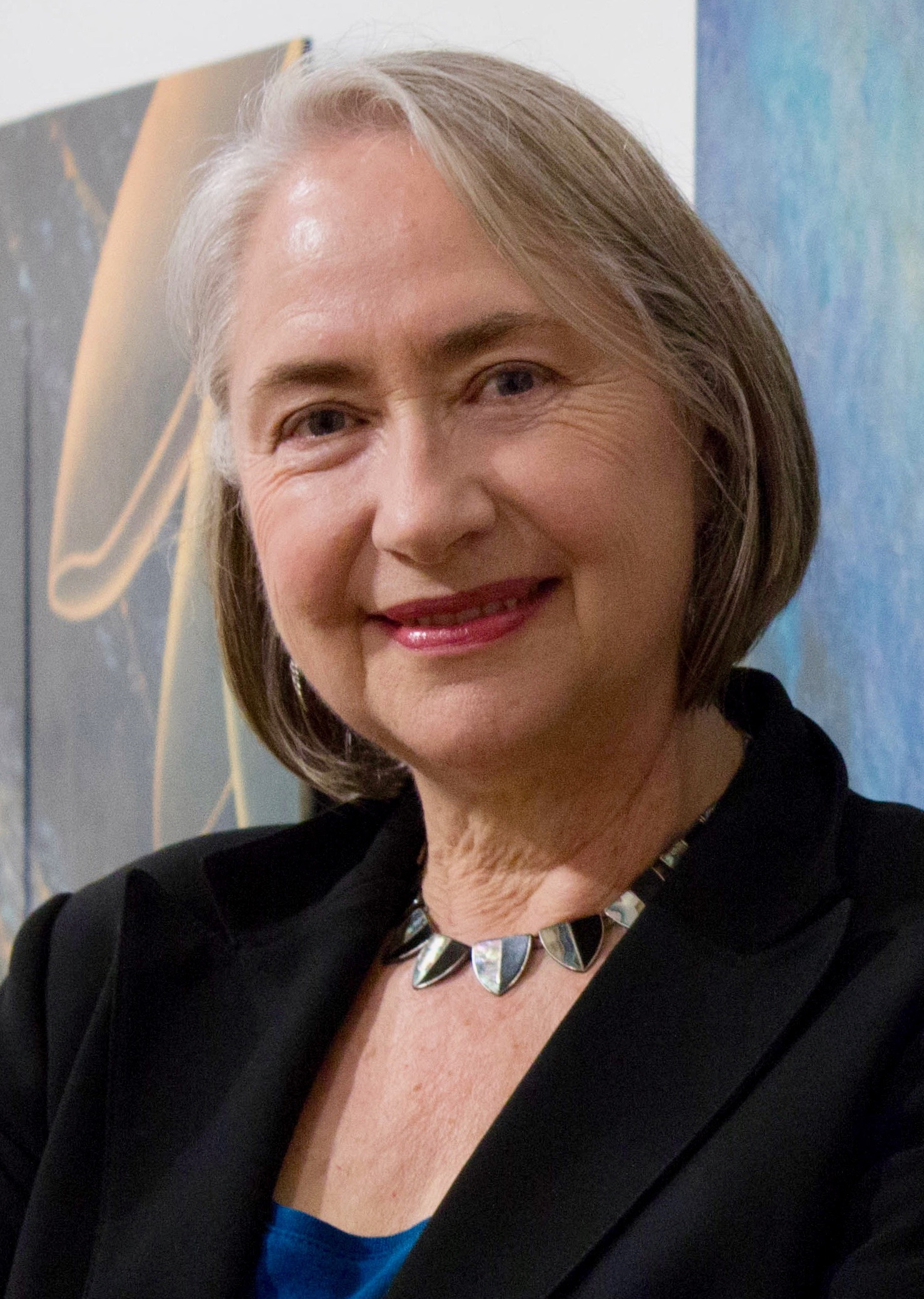
Deborah Kennedy

This is an article about the author and artist. For the Australian character actress, see Deborah Kennedy.

Deborah Kennedy (born 1953) is an American author, educator and artist whose work has focused primarily on environmental advocacy and ecological concerns. She has also lectured on art and art history at Santa Clara University and San Jose City College. She has received attention in media for her art projects, most notably along the Berlin Wall before its fall in November 1989.

== Personal life ==
Deborah Kennedy was born in Connecticut in 1953. She received her BA in the Practice of Art in 1983 from the University of California, Berkeley and her MFA in Plastic Arts in 1987 from the San Jose State University. She lives in San Jose, California.

== Career ==
Kennedy's project at the Berlin Wall was installed in April 1989. It consisted of over 100 copper and brass plaques with inscriptions sharing hopes and fears of Americans and people from East and West German. Kennedy's project was featured in a 1989 article for the San Jose Mercury News about its impact on the local community and how it allowed communication between East and West Berliners. Kennedy was assisted by the Checkpoint Charlie Museum along with political activist Ranier Hildebrant in mounting her work on the wall under the scrutiny of East German patrol guards. With the fall of the Berlin Wall in November 1989, Kennedy's art was also taken down and collected at least in part as souvenirs by locals.

During the mid-1990s, Kennedy received a California Arts Council grant for a project working with young people at a continuation high school to produce graffiti murals. In 1997 she was awarded an Artist's Fellowship for Installation Arts from the Arts Council Silicon Valley. In that same year she completed work on the public sculpture entitled EcoTech featured at the Champion Light Rail Station in San Jose. From September 1999 to March 2000, Kennedy's artworks were featured at the De Saisset Museum of the Santa Clara University for her exhibition titled Nature Speaks. Kennedy has also taught art and art history at Santa Clara University and also taught art history, drawing and design courses at San Jose City College.

Kennedy was commissioned by the San Jose Public Art Program to work alongside sculptor Diana Pumpelly Bates in 2004 on completion of a community project for the Coyote Creek Trail recreational area of San Jose and Santa Clara County, California. Their public artworks, including Kennedy's 'Ripple Effect', are used to promote public awareness of a concrete landing pad and ramp leading to a levee where strollers, wheelchairs, and bicyclists have greater accessibility to the site.

Kennedy was included in the 2021 edition of The Billboard Creative, presenting a portrait from her 1989 Berlin Wall installation on a high-traffic commercial billboard in Los Angeles.

In 2024, Kennedy was named a Creative Ambassador by the City of San Jose's Office of Cultural Affairs, producing a creative project that invites active participation from residents and celebrates the diversity of San Jose's cultural communities. Her project, The Broadside Art and Poetry Project, offers public workshops where San Jose residents produce customized broadsides, giving voice to a wide variety of creative people in the San Jose community.

== Publications ==
In 2016 Kennedy published Nature Speaks: Art and Poetry for the Earth (White Cloud Press). It won the 2017 Eric Hoffer and Silver Nautilus poetry book awards for its use of combined visual art and poetry highlighting natural and ecological themes. Nature Speaks was also reviewed by Helen Dumont for the August 2017 edition of the Midwest Book Review. As featured in Gravel Magazine, her work includes projects such as "Plankton Follies", a cento, or a poem created from lines of existing writing. These poems and ink illustrations emphasize the impact of climate change on plankton while incorporating passages from Barbara W. Tuchman's The March of Folly as well as works by Richard R. Kirby and Christian Sardet.

Kennedy has also served as a contributor to other publications. Her satirical poem, Habeas Corpus, was featured in Birds Fall Silent in the Mechanical Sea, a 2019 anthology of poetry and fictional writing. "Canary: A Literary Journal of the Environmental Crisis," published her poems, First Words and Unseen in 2018. Another two of her poems, Another Day and Seven Springs were published in, "The Midwest Quarterly: A Journal of Contemporary Thought," published by Pittsburg State University in the Fall of 2020. Her poem, "Close as Blood," was published in Caesura, a journal of art and poetry printed by the Poetry Center San Jose. [Caesura, Poetry Center San Jose, Spring 2023, San Jose, CA.]

== See also ==
- Women Environmental Artists Directory
