= Lick Mill station =

VTA light rail station in Santa Clara, California

Lick Mill
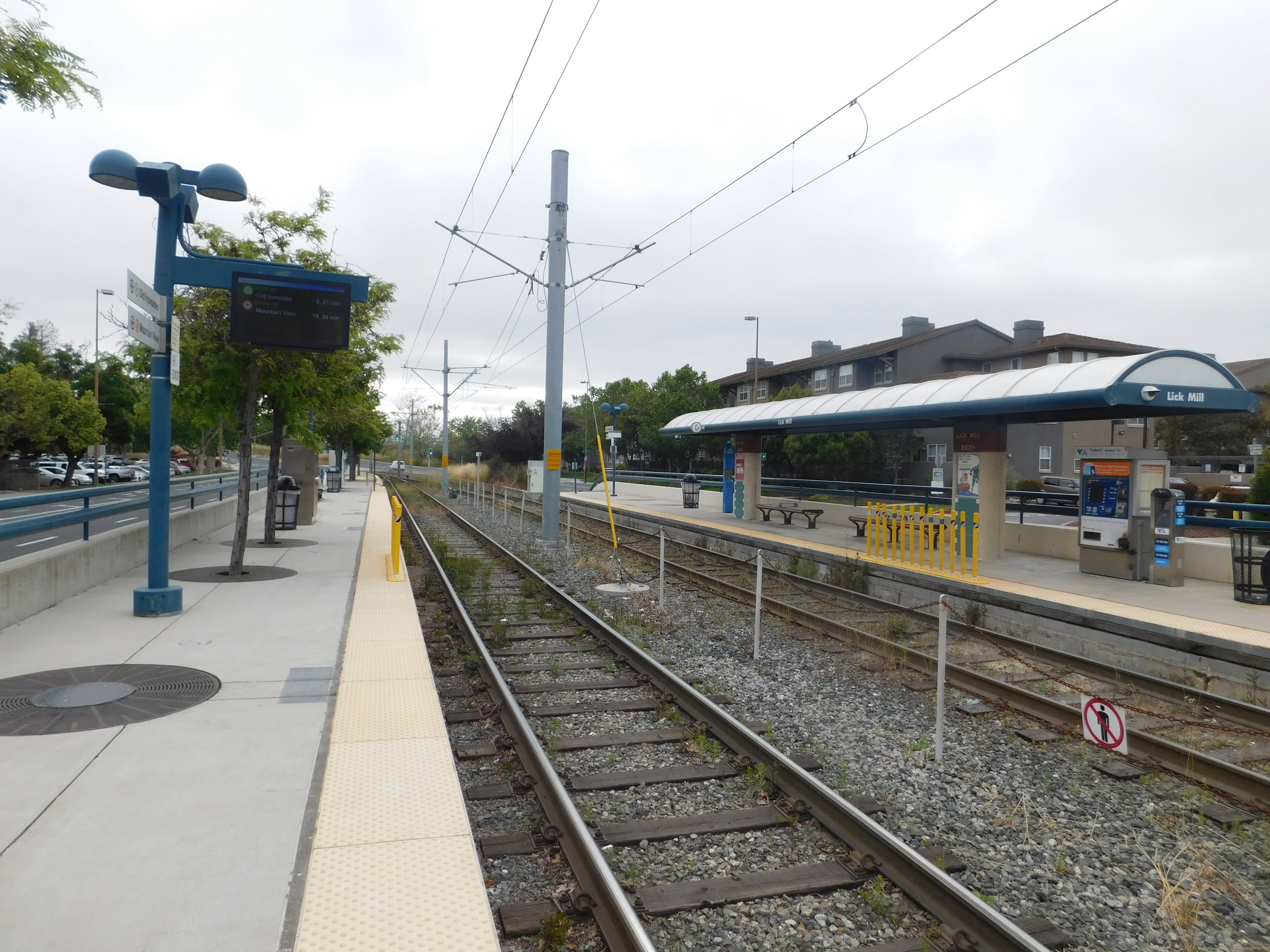
- Lick Mill station in May 2023.

General information
- Location: 2001 Tasman Drive; Santa Clara, California
- Coordinates: 37°24′28″N 121°57′48″W
- Owner: Santa Clara Valley Transportation Authority
- Line: Guadalupe Phase 1
- Platforms: 1 island platform
- Tracks: 2
- Connections: Altamont Corridor Express (at Great America); Capitol Corridor (at Great America)

Construction
- Structure type: At-grade
- Accessible: Yes

History
- Opened: December 11, 1987; 38 years ago

Services
Preceding station	VTA	Following station
Great America toward Old Ironsides	Green Line	Champion toward Winchester
Great America toward Mountain View	Orange Line	Champion toward Alum Rock
Location

Lick Mill station is a light rail station operated by Santa Clara Valley Transportation Authority (VTA). Located on Tasman Drive between Calle Del Sol and Lick Mill Road in Santa Clara, California, the station is served by the Orange and Green light rail lines.

Lick Mill is VTA's recommended transfer point for Altamont Corridor Express (ACE) commuter rail and Capitol Corridor inter-city rail trains at Santa Clara–Great America station. Despite the similar names, VTA's Great America station is not the connection point, because it is about 3/5 mile (0.97 km) away from the ACE/Capitol Corridor station, while Lick Mill station is only 1/5 mile (0.32 km) away. The path between the VTA station and the ACE/Capitol Corridor station is well signed but is not wheelchair accessible because of a staircase.

Lick Mill is closed for up to 60 minutes after the events at the nearby Levi's Stadium to prevent crowds from overwhelming the station. VTA's Great America station (which is located closer to the stadium) has additional facilities to handle large crowds.

== Location ==
The station is located in the median of Tasman Drive just east of Calle Del Sol. The northbound platform is located closer to Lick Mill Road while the southbound platform is located closer to Calle Del Sol.
