= Great America station (VTA) =

VTA light rail station in Santa Clara, California

Great America
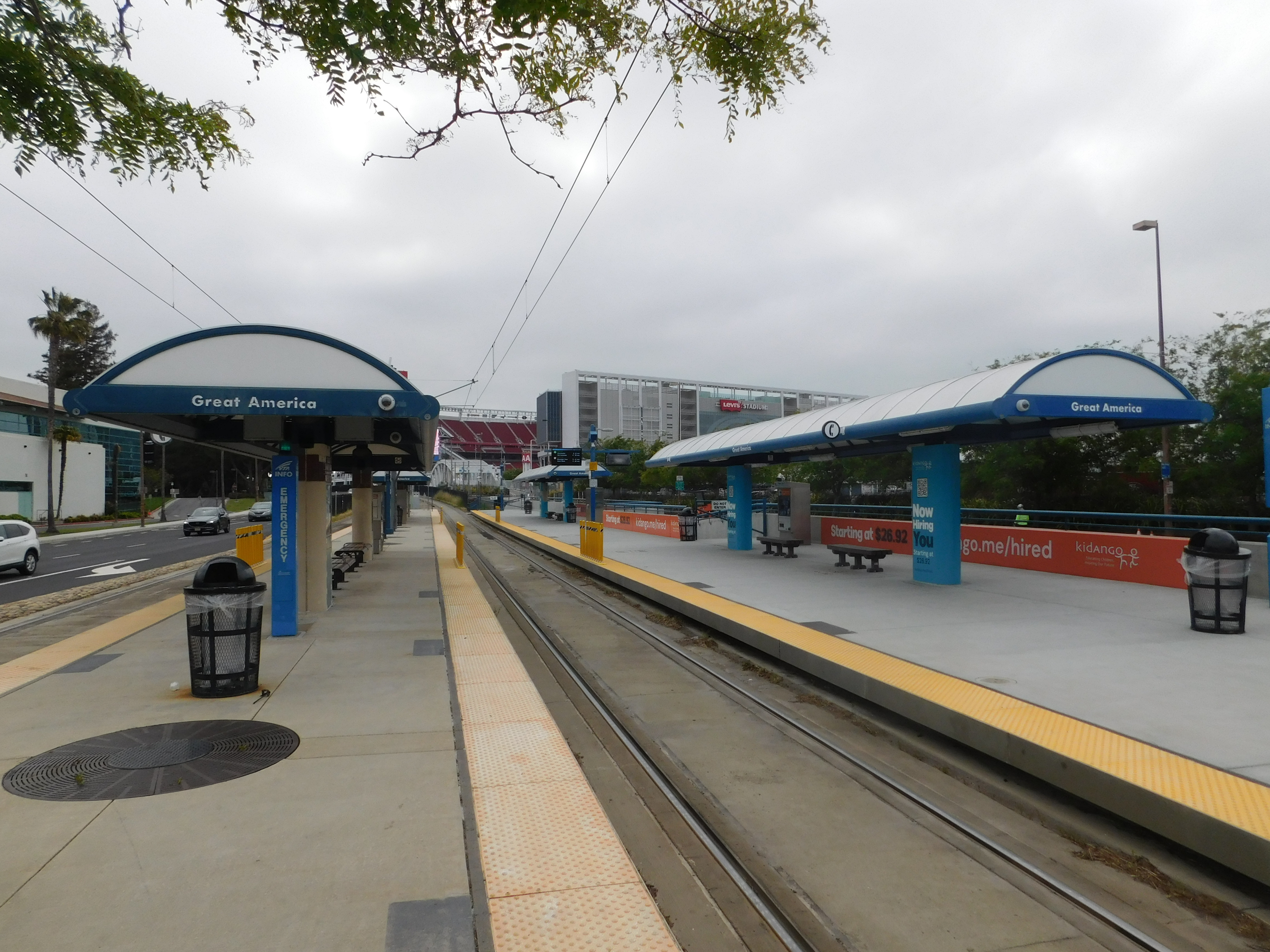
- Great America station in May 2023

General information
- Location: 2799 Tasman Drive; Santa Clara, California
- Coordinates: 37°24′13″N 121°58′28″W
- Owner: Santa Clara Valley Transportation Authority
- Line: Guadalupe Phase 1
- Platforms: 1 island platform 1 side platform
- Tracks: 2

Construction
- Structure type: At-grade
- Cycle facilities: Lockers
- Accessible: Yes

History
- Opened: December 11, 1987; 38 years ago
- Rebuilt: 2014

Services
Preceding station	VTA	Following station
Old Ironsides Terminus	Green Line	Lick Mill toward Winchester
Old Ironsides toward Mountain View	Orange Line	Lick Mill toward Alum Rock
Location

Great America station (officially Great America/Levi's Stadium station) is a light rail station operated by Santa Clara Valley Transportation Authority (VTA). Great America is served by the Orange and Green light rail lines. Great America is named for the nearby California's Great America theme park and is the closest station to Levi's Stadium, home of the San Francisco 49ers.

From the station platforms, the entrance to Levi's Stadium is a 1/5 mile (0.32 km) walk and the entrance to the Great America theme park is a 2/5 mile (0.64 km) walk.

The station underwent improvements ahead of the July 2014 opening of Levi's Stadium, including adding a side platform serving the eastbound track. The new platform has multiple gates and after events customers are asked to queue in different lines based on their destination to facilitate rapid loading of trains.

A pocket track was also added between the Reamwood and Old Ironsides stations, enabling the storage of three 3-car trains to mobilize trains quickly after the end of an event at Levi's Stadium.

Despite the similar names, this station is not the recommended transfer point for the Santa Clara–Great America station used by Altamont Corridor Express (ACE) commuter rail and Capitol Corridor inter-city rail trains as the walk between the stations is about 3/5 mile (0.97 km). VTA advises passengers to use Lick Mill station, which is only 1/5 mile (0.32 km) away from the ACE/Capitol Corridor station.

== Location ==
The station is located in the median of Tasman Drive between the Santa Clara Convention Center and California's Great America. It is also across the street from Levi's Stadium, home of the San Francisco 49ers. This station is a short 0.2-mile (0.32 km) walk from Old Ironsides station.
