= Levi's Stadium =

Stadium in Santa Clara, California

- Field of Jeans

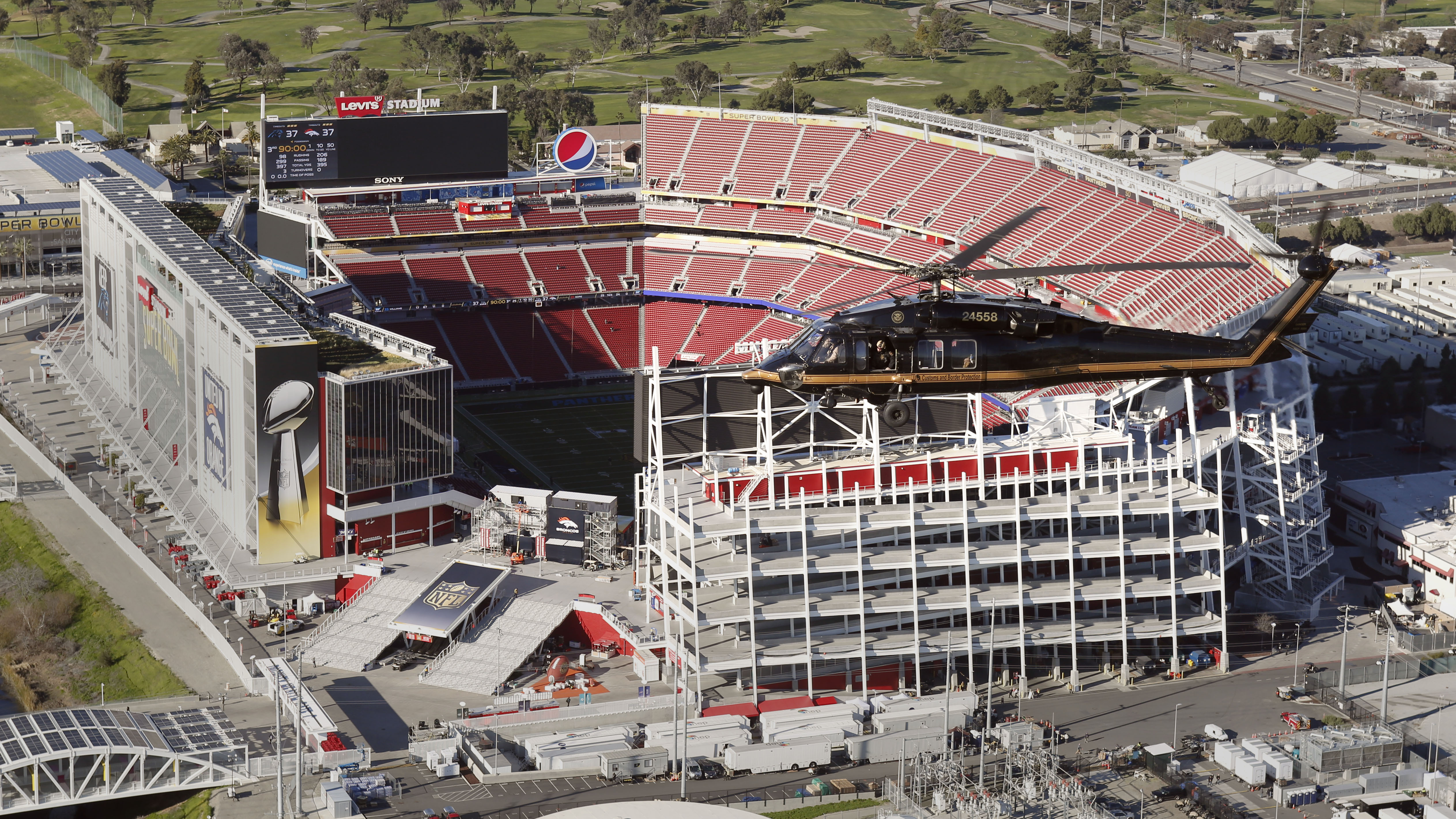
- Prior to Super Bowl 50 in February 2016

- Location near San Jose Location in California Location in the United States
- Former names: San Francisco Bay Area Stadium (2026 FIFA World Cup)
- Address: 4900 Marie P DeBartolo Way
- Location: Santa Clara, California, U.S.
- Coordinates: 37.403°N 121.970°W
- Elevation: 16 feet (5 m) AMSL
- Owner: Santa Clara Stadium Authority
- Operator: Forty Niners Football Company LLC
- Capacity: 68,500; 68,827 (2026 FIFA World Cup)
- Executive suites: 174
- Surface: Bermuda grass
- Scoreboard: Yes
- Record attendance: 80,058 ( Ed Sheeran +–=÷× Tour, September 16, 2023)
- Public transit: Santa Clara–Great America; Great America

Construction
- Groundbreaking: April 19, 2012
- Opened: July 14, 2014; 12 years ago
- Cost: $1.3 billion (est) ($1.77 billion in 2025 dollars)
- Architect: HNTB
- Project manager: Hatheway Consulting LLC.
- Structural engineer: Magnusson Klemencic Associates
- Services engineers: Electrical: Cupertino Electric; Mechanical: M–E Engineers
- General contractor: Turner/Devcon JV

Tenants
- San Francisco 49ers (NFL) 2014–present San Francisco Bowl (NCAA) 2014–2019

Website
- levisstadium.com

Levi's Stadium is an outdoor stadium near the West Coast of the United States, located in Santa Clara, California, just west of San Jose in the San Francisco Bay Area. It has served as the home venue for the San Francisco 49ers of the National Football League (NFL) since 2014. Located approximately forty miles (65 km) south of San Francisco, it is named after Levi Strauss & Co., which purchased naming rights in 2013.

In 2006, the 49ers proposed constructing a new stadium at Candlestick Point in San Francisco, the site of Candlestick Park, their home since 1971. The project, which included plans for retail space and housing improvements, was claimed to be of great potential benefit to the nearby historically blighted neighborhood of Hunters Point. After negotiations with the city of San Francisco fell through, the 49ers focused their attention on a site adjacent to their administrative offices and training facility in Santa Clara.

In June 2010, Santa Clara voters approved a measure authorizing the creation of the tax-exempt Santa Clara Stadium Authority to build and own the new football stadium and for the city to lease land to the authority. A construction loan raised from private investors was secured in December 2011, allowing construction to start in April 2012. Levi's Stadium opened on July 17, 2014.

Levi's Stadium was the site of the Pac-12 Football Championship Game from 2014 through 2019, before moving to Allegiant Stadium in Paradise, Nevada. Previously, that game was played on the home field of the division winner possessing the better record. The stadium hosted WWE's WrestleMania 31 on March 29, 2015, Super Bowl 50 on February 7, 2016, and Super Bowl LX on February 8, 2026. The stadium also hosted the 2019 College Football Playoff National Championship, and hosted six matches during the 2026 FIFA World Cup.

== Stadium design ==
The stadium was designed by architectural firm HNTB, with a focus on creating a multi-purpose venue and with the fan experience and green technology as top priorities. Civil engineering work was performed by Winzler & Kelly, which was acquired by GHD Group in 2011. Commissioning services were provided by Glumac.

=== Basic stadium features ===
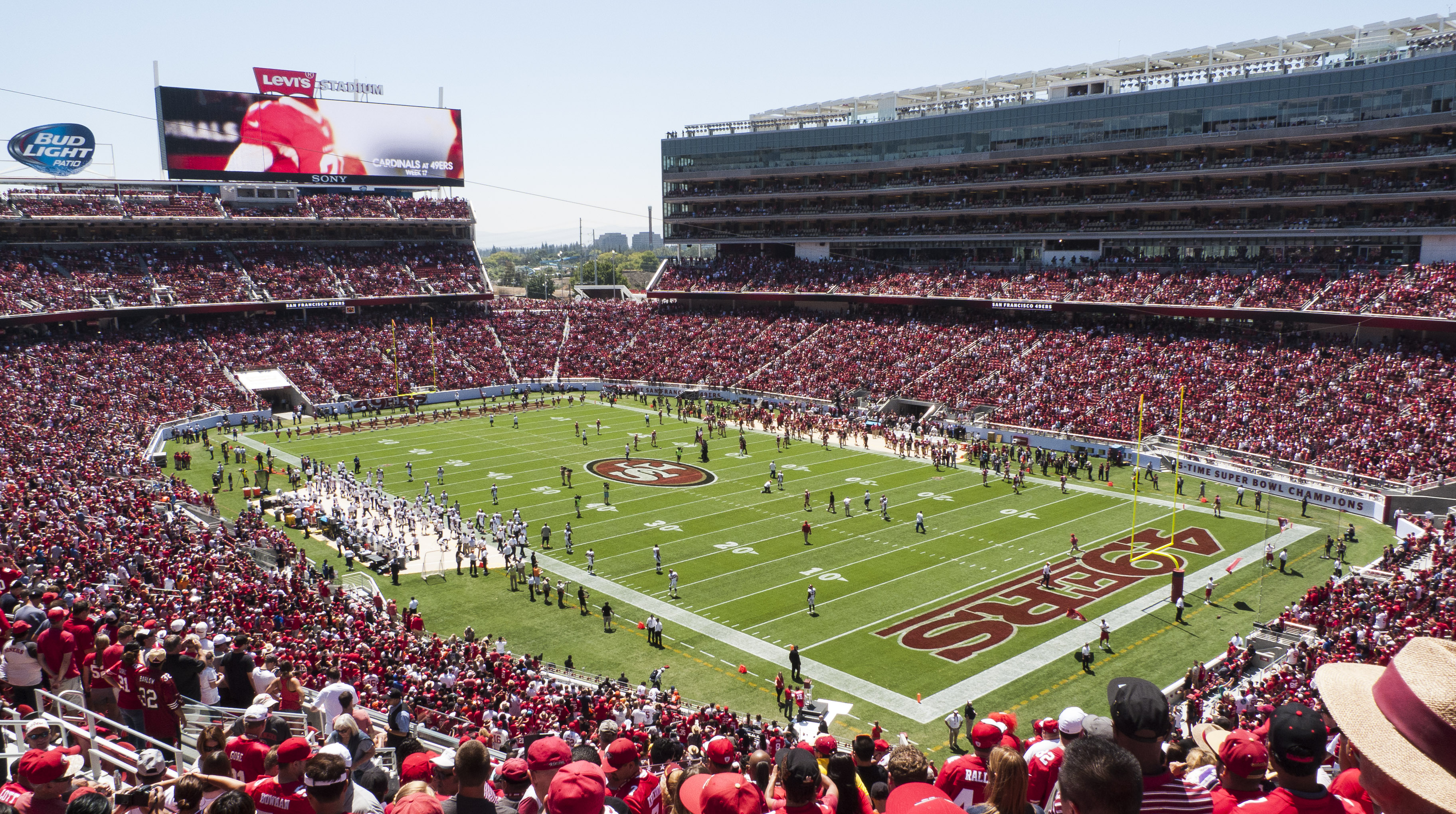
Levi's Stadium in August 2014 during a 49ers preseason game

Levi's Stadium is designed as an open stadium with a natural grass field. It has a seating capacity of 68,500, expandable to approximately 75,000 to host major events like the Super Bowl, WrestleMania, and the FIFA World Cup. On June 27, 2015, The Grateful Dead's Fare Thee Well Tour made history by extending the stadium seating capacity to 83,000, although only 77,000 attended the event over two nights. To date, the record attendance for a single day event was almost 80,000 for an Ed Sheeran concert on September 16, 2023.

The seating design of the stadium places approximately two-thirds of the fans in the lower bowl, which is one of the largest of its kind in the NFL. The design features significantly improved accessibility and seating options for fans with special needs and disabilities when compared to the 49ers former home, the now-demolished Candlestick Park. The configuration is similar to Ford Field, home of the NFL's Detroit Lions, with the majority of the luxury suites on one side of the field, which puts the fans in the upper deck closer to the action.

Opposite sides of Levi's Stadium

View toward the stadium's multi-level luxury suites.

View toward the opposite grandstand, showing its tiers of spectator seating.

As a multi-use facility, the stadium can be configured for special touring events including concerts, motocross events, indoor/outdoor conferences, and other community events. The stadium is also designed to meet the FIFA field geometry requirements for international soccer, which allow it to host international friendly matches and major tournaments such as the FIFA World Cup. The stadium also features over 109,000 square feet (10,100 m^{2}) of flexible premium meeting space in the club areas.

==== Issues with the turf ====
The stadium had repeated problems with the grass surface, including the grass collapsing under Baltimore Ravens kicker Justin Tucker during a week 6 game in 2015. This led to concern that the stadium wasn't of a high enough caliber to host a high stakes game such as the Super Bowl. The problems with the turf were mentioned the day after the Super Bowl by Denver Broncos cornerback Aqib Talib who said "The footing on the field was terrible. San Fran (the 49ers) has to play eight games on that field, so they better do something to get it fixed. It was terrible."

=== Environmental sustainability ===
Stadium proponents claim that the stadium is currently one of the largest buildings registered with the U.S. Green Building Council. It is also believed to be the first stadium that will have both a green roof and solar panels. The 49ers are exploring collaborative opportunities with the Environmental Protection Agency to explore environmentally friendly components including:

- Use of an outside commissioning agent to verify that energy‐related systems are installed, calibrated, and performing in compliance with the project requirements
- Use of public transit nearby including VTA, ACE, Amtrak, with connection to a proposed future BART extension
- Construction of a green roof (27,000± sf) and photovoltaic panels (20,000± sf)
- Use of paving materials and roofing materials with a high solar reflectance index
- Use of recycled water for landscape irrigation, toilets, and urinals along with water‐conserving fixtures
- No use of CFC‐based refrigerants in the HVAC systems. Systems will instead use refrigerants that minimize compounds that contribute to ozone depletion
- Installation of permanent monitoring systems that provide feedback on ventilation system performance
- Diversion, recycling, and/or salvaging 75% of non‐hazardous construction waste
- Use of controllable and programmable lighting control systems and thermal comfort control systems

Levi's Stadium received a Gold LEED (Leadership in Energy and Environmental Design) Certificate. It is the first professional football stadium in the United States to receive this certification as new construction.

=== Rooftop farm ===
In July 2016, Levi's Stadium converted 6,500 square feet (600 m^{2}) of the green roof to an organically maintained rooftop farm. The vision for this quarter-acre—named the Faithful Farm after the 49ers' loyal following—came from team CEO Jed York and his wife. Danielle York, a former science teacher, was particularly interested in a dedicated space that could help the building achieve some of its goals for sustainability. Lara Hermanson and Matt Sandoval of Farmscape worked with the San Francisco 49ers to create the Faithful Farm, the first rooftop farm on an NFL stadium. Herbs, tomatoes, peppers, zucchini, leafy greens and edible flowers are among the 40 rotational crops which are harvested for use in dishes served at Levi's Stadium in club spaces during games and at the more than 200 private events hosted at the stadium each year. As of 2019 the farm was undergoing expansion to add another 6,500 square feet (600 m^{2}).

=== Transportation ===
==== Public transit ====
Station name	Agency name
Great America	VTA Light Rail
Santa Clara - Great America	ACE
Santa Clara - Great America	Amtrak

Stadium patrons have the option of riding VTA light rail (Valley Transportation Authority) to the stadium. The closest light rail station is Great America station, which is located just west of the stadium in the median of Tasman Drive.

To the east, other transit options include the VTA Lick Mill station (also in the Tasman median) as well as the Amtrak and ACE Santa Clara–Great America station near California's Great America. VTA also offers dedicated shuttle bus service to the stadium from the Warm Springs BART station.

==== Walking and bicycling ====
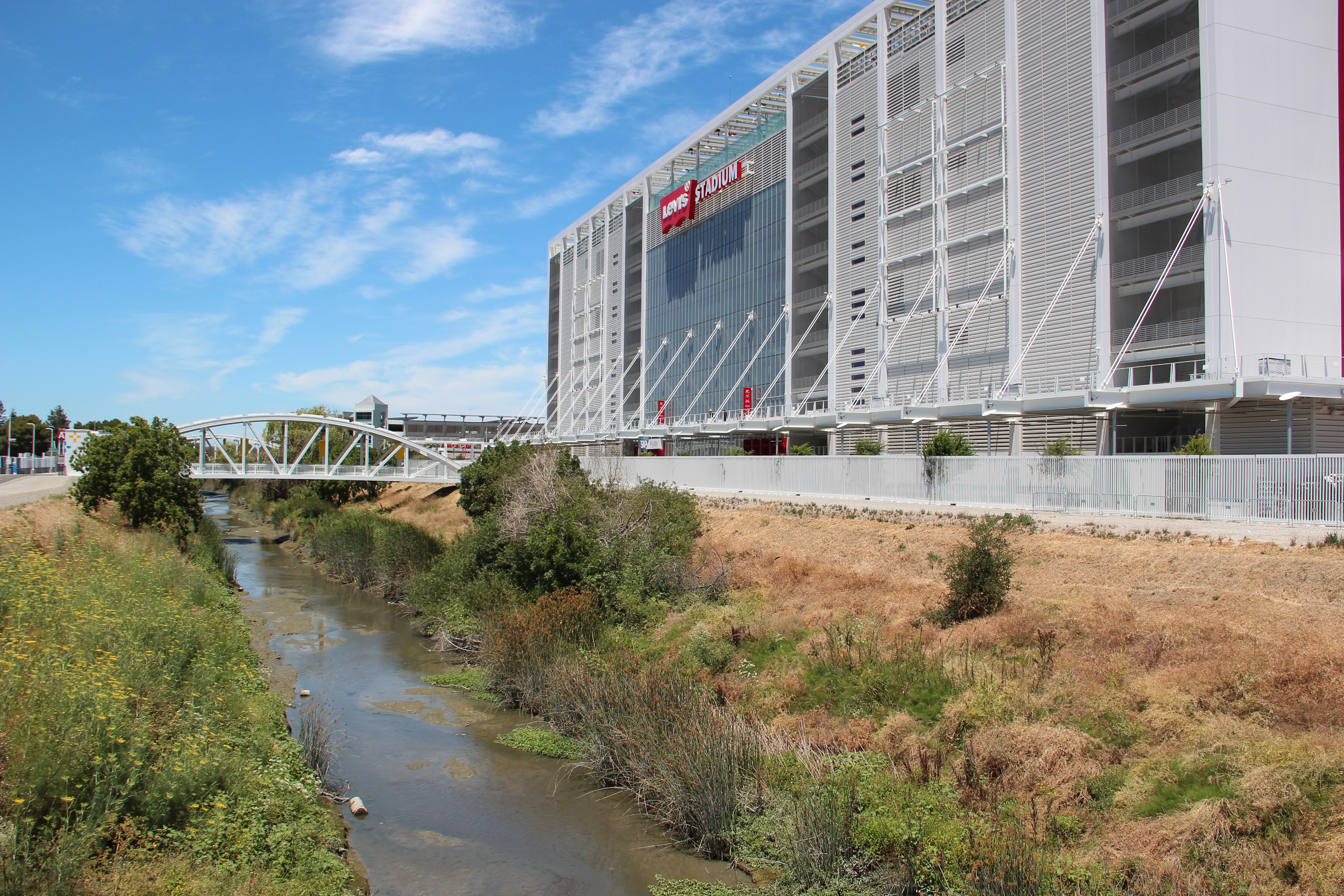
San Tomas Aquino Creek next to Levi's Stadium

Levi's Stadium was constructed immediately east of the San Tomas Aquino Trail, a paved multi-use path installed by the City of Santa Clara in 2004 that connects to a continuous 100-mile (160 km) network of off-street paths including the regional San Francisco Bay Trail. The city announced in March 2013 that the San Tomas Aquino Trail would be "temporarily detoured between Agnew Road and Tasman Drive for approximately one year starting April 15 and ending when the Stadium is open," but this one-mile section of the trail remained closed to the public before and during stadium events since they began in August 2014, requiring the continued use of the two-mile on-street detour.

The stadium project's Final Environmental Impact Report (EIR) disclosed no such ongoing temporary closures of the trail, but stated instead that "While there will likely be a sizeable increase in pedestrians on the San Tomas Aquino Creek trail before and after NFL events, the creek trail is open to both pedestrians and cyclists and there are no restrictions on use. Anyone at anytime can access and use the trail."

==== Vehicular access ====
The stadium's official mailing address is on Marie P DeBartolo Way (formerly Centennial Boulevard), which is actually a cul-de-sac on the east side of the stadium. The primary access route to the stadium is Tasman Drive, which runs along its northern side. Tasman is a major east–west arterial road which connects to Interstate 880 several miles to the east. Both west and east of the stadium, Tasman intersects with various north–south arterial roads which connect to several important freeways, such as California State Route 87, U.S. Route 101, California State Route 237, and Interstate 680. The closest and most important of those north–south roads is Great America Parkway to the west of the stadium, which is named after the theme park to the south.

===== Parking =====
In November 2013, stadium and 49ers' officials initially requested the NFL to not schedule any Monday or Thursday night home games during Levi's Stadium's inaugural season due to parking issues in the area surrounding the stadium during weekdays. Two months later, in January 2014, the Santa Clara city government was able to secure more than the 21,000 necessary parking spots by approving use of the fairways at the city-owned Santa Clara Golf and Tennis Club (which is located to the north of the stadium across Tasman Drive). This arrangement is similar to and was modeled upon a longstanding arrangement between the Rose Bowl in Pasadena and the adjacent Brookside Golf Course, where the golf course was modified to allow for vehicular access to the fairways; they are used for parking only when dry to minimize damage, and any damage that does occur is repaired afterward.

With access to the golf course fairways, Levi's Stadium now had 31,600 potential parking spaces, meaning that tailgating and weeknight games were now a possibility. However, the NFL decided not to schedule any weeknight home games at Levi's Stadium in 2014 until traffic flow within the area is figured out, with the exception of a Thanksgiving game between the 49ers and the Seattle Seahawks on November 27, 2014. Parking prices, which averaged $30 in the 49ers' final season at Candlestick Park, will increase to $40 at Levi's Stadium.

Anticipating significant traffic from Levi's Stadium visitors, the nearby city of Mountain View instituted a three-hour parking limit on downtown streets during game days. While residents received exemptions via permit tags, stadium-goers must park in paid lots or far from Mountain View's Caltrain/VTA light rail station. This station is the closest VTA light rail station to San Francisco and receives transferring passengers heading south to San Jose via light rail (including people using the light rail to go directly to the Levi's Stadium station).

In Spring 2015, 49ers' officials offered the city of Santa Clara $15 million to take over the adjacent Santa Clara Youth Soccer Park and convert these soccer fields into additional parking lots. This money, along with a large percentage of parking fees, would have then been used for the city to build a new youth sports complex elsewhere. The plan was opposed by the youth soccer leagues that use the fields, and critics calling it a "land grab". After many youth soccer players attended a city council meeting on April 29 to protest the proposal, the 49ers withdrew the $15 million offer. The team then gave the city an unsolicited offer of $3 million to help improve various youth athletic fields and facilities, which was cited as a peace offering by San Francisco Chronicle columnists Phil Matier and Andrew Ross, and other Bay Area media, but the city council turned the offer down.

=== Naming rights ===
On May 8, 2013, the 49ers announced that San Francisco-based Levi Strauss & Co. purchased the naming rights to the new stadium. The deal calls for Levi's to pay $220.3 million to the city of Santa Clara and the 49ers over 20 years, with an option to extend the deal for another five years for around $75 million. On September 14, 2015, ESPN's Chris Berman coined the name "The Big Bellbottom" in reference to the stadium. In a Deadspin article covering the 49ers on August 18, 2015, article writer Drew Magary coined the nickname "the Jeanhole" for the stadium.

== Reception ==
Levi's Stadium has been praised for its excellent sightlines, beautiful architecture, plentiful amenities, technological advancements, convenient public transportation access, and environmental sustainability. However, the stadium has been heavily criticized for its highly corporate atmosphere and lack of a football atmosphere that Candlestick Park had. With the stadium having the most expensive ticket prices in the league during its inaugural season, many long-tenured and loyal fans that had contributed to the football atmosphere at Candlestick Park could not afford to buy season tickets with the added cost of the Stadium Builders License. Additionally, with the distractions inside the stadium that include multiple bars and lounges, fans would often hang out in those places while the game is going on rather than watching the game from their seats.

Levi's Stadium has received some backlash from season ticket holders, who are unhappy regarding rules that won't allow them to print their tickets until 72 hours before the game, making re-sale very difficult. In addition, older 49ers fans say that people are more segmented at Levi's Stadium in comparison to Candlestick Park, leaving tailgaters with large expanses of empty parking stalls and a more desolate tailgating experience.

Pilots flying into San Jose International Airport have frequently complained of being blinded or disoriented by the lights from the light towers and scoreboards. The stadium is directly in the flight path of one of the airport's runways. According to Bay Area NBC affiliate KNTV in 2016, there had been at least 43 complaints about the lights since the stadium opened.

Levi's Stadium has also received heavy criticism for the way fans are treated on hot days during early-season afternoon games. The majority of fans are seated on the east side of the stadium and during these afternoon games, this side of the stadium is fully exposed to the elements due to the lack of overhangs. With the climate of Santa Clara being much warmer than San Francisco, it makes watching games on hot days uncomfortable for fans as they are less accommodated for exposure to the sun than are patrons at other stadiums in hot-weather climates. Several fans suffered heat exhaustion during preseason and early season afternoon games. This has led to the eastern stands being largely empty on hot days. The stadium had been designed with the Candlestick Point site in mind and when the team decided to build it in Santa Clara instead, they kept the design intact in order to quickly get started on construction without taking the differences in climate into account. Due to its close proximity to the airport, Federal Aviation Administration regulations do not allow the 49ers to add any more height to the stadium, while any additional overhangs would have to be structures, making it very difficult to fix the problem.

== History ==
=== Previous plans ===
The 49ers pursued a new stadium since 1997, when a plan for a stadium and a mall at Candlestick Point passed a public vote. When the plans failed to move forward, the San Francisco 49ers presented an alternative plan on July 18, 2006, to construct a new 68,500-seat, open air stadium as part of a mixed use development featuring housing, commercial and retail space. In November 2006, the team announced that plans for a new stadium at Candlestick Point were not feasible, "citing extensive costs for infrastructure, parking accommodations and other changes that would cost more than the stadium itself". The 49ers turned their focus to making Santa Clara the home to their new stadium.

==== The 1997 plan ====
San Francisco voters in 1997 approved $100 million in city spending to build a new stadium and an attached shopping mall at Candlestick Point. However, even after voter approval to grant economic help for the project, the stadium was not constructed. This was because owner Eddie DeBartolo Jr. was facing legal troubles, which led him to surrender ownership of the team to his sister Denise DeBartolo York and brother-in-law John York. Mills Corporation, the company chosen by the 49ers, was unable to put together a plan to successfully construct a new stadium for the team. NFL owners had gone as far as awarding the new stadium the rights to host Super Bowl XXXVII. When stadium plans stalled, the game went to San Diego's Qualcomm Stadium instead.

For years, the city and team ownership were embattled over attempts to gain funding and a green-light for construction of a new stadium. None of these attempts proved to be successful.

==== The 2006 plan ====
The city of San Francisco received a new incentive to get a new stadium built. Mayor Gavin Newsom wanted to bring the 2016 Summer Olympics to the city, and a new stadium would sweeten the city's proposal for selection by the United States Olympic Committee as the official US submission to the IOC. The announcement came in November 2006. It called for a new stadium that would be converted into a 68,600-seat stadium for the 49ers after the Olympics. The Olympic Village would be converted into low-income housing after the games were over.

The new stadium was to be built at Candlestick Point on land just southeast of Candlestick Park. The cost of the stadium would be $916 million. Lennar would build housing, retail, and office space around the stadium area. Originally, part of the area surrounding Candlestick Park was to be zoned for retail space and housing; the new 49ers stadium was to be combined with such elements, bringing much-needed attractions to the historically blighted neighborhood of Hunters Point.

The stadium would be stocked with 150 luxury suites, 7,500 premium club seats, and an increased number of seats lower and closer to the field, called "bowl seating", potentially raising the 49ers franchise value up as much as $250 million and offering at least $300 million in advertising and concession deals, the majority of which from paid corporate naming. The architectural design would be reminiscent of San Francisco buildings.

The project planning did not get off to a good start, however, with contention between the 49ers and the city of San Francisco over viable locations for the new stadium. Initially, the idea was to build a stadium in the parking lot of Candlestick Park and later demolish the aging stadium. Team ownership feared that construction of the village and the stadium would severely limit the amount of land available in Candlestick Point, creating a parking problem for fans and increasing traffic along the roads that link the stadium to the freeway. Moreover, with residents in the low-income housing by 2016, traffic would be permanently increased, further damaging the already-limited methods of transportation to the park.

With San Francisco slow to come up with better locations for the stadium, or ways to circumvent the problems posed by construction at Candlestick Point, team owners Denise DeBartolo York and John York announced on November 9, 2006, that the 49ers were shifting their efforts to create a new stadium to the city of Santa Clara, home to the team offices and training facility since 1987, approximately 40 miles (64 km) south of San Francisco.

The sudden removal of the planned stadium forced the San Francisco Olympics bid group to cancel its proposal, which engendered great anger not only from Mayor Newsom, but also from such 49ers legends as Joe Montana and Ronnie Lott, who were part of the effort to bring the Olympics to the Bay Area. In addition, many fans were outraged at the suggestion to move the 49ers out of the city that it had shared history with for decades. The Yorks insisted that the legacy of the franchise would be respected in the sense that the 49ers would not be renamed nor moved out of the Bay Area. This was met with much opposition from Mayor Newsom and Senator Dianne Feinstein (who was mayor of San Francisco between 1978 and 1988); the senator stated that the team should be unable to use the San Francisco name if its operations were not based in the city. On January 3, 2007, California State Senator Carole Migden introduced a bill, entitled SB49, that would bar the 49ers from building a new stadium within a 100-mile (160 km) radius of San Francisco, if they were to leave the city. The 49ers organization announced its strong opposition to the legislation and retorted that passing such a bill would only encourage the team to move out of the Bay Area altogether. The bill died without being acted upon.

=== Santa Clara negotiations ===
The Santa Clara stadium project had been in the works since 2007, with negotiations beginning in 2008. A term sheet was released for the stadium project in June 2010 and included an agreement between the city and 49ers that covered the financing, construction, operation, and eventual demolition of the stadium. The project would require no new or increased city taxes or costs to residents and the 49ers were to be responsible for construction and operation cost overruns. The city would own the land and receive rent payments back to its general fund from the stadium.

Most city council members in Santa Clara were extremely receptive to the possibility of a new stadium being constructed there for the 49ers. In 2009, the Santa Clara City Council, led by Mayor Patricia Mahan, along with city employees began negotiating in earnest with the team, who presented the city with stadium plans. On June 2, 2009, by a 5–2 vote, the Santa Clara city council agreed to preliminary terms (as detailed in a term sheet). The official term sheet stated that the team's name would not change; the team would continue to be called the San Francisco 49ers even when the move to Santa Clara was complete.

=== The campaign ===
==== Santa Clara stadium campaign ====
In December 2009, Cedar Fair Entertainment Company, the then-owner of the California's Great America theme park, filed a lawsuit to stop the project from proceeding. However, the lawsuit was dismissed in court.

On December 15, 2009, the Santa Clara City Council voted 5–2 to withdraw their city-sponsored ballot measure on the stadium issue in favor of a ballot initiative, Measure J. The ballot initiative was voted on on June 8, 2010, and passed by 58% of Santa Clara voters. Santa Clara City Council members William Kennedy and Jamie McLeod had opposed the stadium project and worked (unsuccessfully) to get Measure J defeated.

==== Measure J: June 8, 2010 ====
Measure J is a binding, voter-initiated measure that was approved by voters in the City of Santa Clara. All documents cited below are publicly available on the City of Santa Clara's official website.

- Ballot Question: This is the question that was presented to voters:
  - Shall the City of Santa Clara adopt Ordinance 17.20 leasing City property for a professional football stadium and other events; no use of City General or Enterprise funds for construction; no new taxes for residents for stadium; Redevelopment Agency funds capped for construction; private party pays all construction cost overruns; no City/Agency obligation for stadium operating/maintenance; private party payment of projected fair market rent; and additional funds for senior/youth/library/recreation to City's General Fund?
- Voter Ordinance: This city ordinance becomes law if Santa Clara voters approve Measure J.

==== Election results ====
Choice	Votes	%
For	14,782	58.46
Against	10,505	41.54
Total	25,287	100.00

=== Oakland Raiders as possible co-tenants ===
There was a possibility that the Oakland Raiders might share the stadium, allowing its costs to be split between the two teams. The stadium is designed to accommodate two teams, with the exterior LEDs being programmable for alternate colors and two home-team locker rooms. The 49ers and Raiders publicly said it would be an option if possible, while NFL commissioner Roger Goodell was strongly in favor of the two sharing a stadium. Fans of both teams reacted negatively to the idea. The arrangement would have been similar to the New York Giants and New York Jets, who shared Giants Stadium from 1984 to 2009 and currently share its successor, MetLife Stadium.

The 49ers and Raiders sharing a stadium would not have been a first, as the two shared Kezar Stadium for part of 1960. It would have also fulfilled the late Raiders owner Al Davis' goal of a new stadium, something he had strongly desired since the late 1980s although Davis was against sharing a new stadium with another NFL team in Los Angeles when the idea was proposed to him, prompting his move back to Oakland in 1995.

In the wake of Davis' death, the possibility of the 49ers and Raiders sharing the stadium became a stronger possibility. However, by October 2011, the 49ers were far enough along on the stadium to have reportedly already sold over a quarter of the luxury suites, meaning the Raiders would be forced to be secondary tenants. In October 2012, Oakland Raiders owner Mark Davis told reporters he had no plans to share the Santa Clara stadium with the 49ers. According to the report, discussions remained open, although Davis wanted to keep the team in Oakland, or a nearby site in Dublin.

When the stadium had its grand opening on July 17, 2014, Goodell mentioned to the live crowd that it would make a great home for the Raiders and that it was up for the team to decide whether or not it wanted to play there or build a stadium on the site of the Oakland Coliseum. While the 49ers remained open to sharing the stadium with the Raiders, the Raiders said that their personal preference was the Coliseum site.

On February 20, 2015, the Raiders announced that they would be seeking a joint stadium in Carson, with the San Diego Chargers should they not receive public funding to replace the Oakland Coliseum, reducing the likelihood of the Raiders sharing Levi's Stadium with the 49ers. In January 2016, after losing their bid to relocate to Los Angeles to the Los Angeles Rams, the Raiders withdrew their request to move to Los Angeles, and joint tenancy at Levi's again surfaced in general discussion. However, in March 2017, the Raiders were approved for a move to Las Vegas for the 2020 season, with the new Allegiant Stadium under construction as their future home.

Levi's Stadium was mentioned as a possible temporary home for the Oakland Raiders for the 2019 season before they relocate to Las Vegas. Santa Clara officials drew up plans for this possibility. However, the Raiders signed a one-year lease extension for the Oakland Coliseum, with an option for a second year of construction if Las Vegas were to be delayed, ending any possibility of them playing at Levi's Stadium.

== Financing ==
In December 2011, the Santa Clara City Council voted for an agreement that calls for the city's Stadium Authority to borrow $850 million from Goldman Sachs, Bank of America and U.S. Bank. This will cover most of the construction costs, with the remainder to be made up via funding from the NFL, a hotel tax and city redevelopment funds. Interest, fees and terms for this loan have not been disclosed. The $850 million building loan, plus interest and fees will be assumed by the city's Stadium Authority, where additional interest and fees will be applied. On February 2, 2012, NFL owners approved a loan to the 49ers of $200 million for use in constructing the new stadium, and to be taken from a new G-4 stadium loan fund. Terms of the loan were not specified, but under the previous G-3 plan, money was repaid directly into the league's account from the borrowing team's share of gate receipts from road games.

== Construction ==
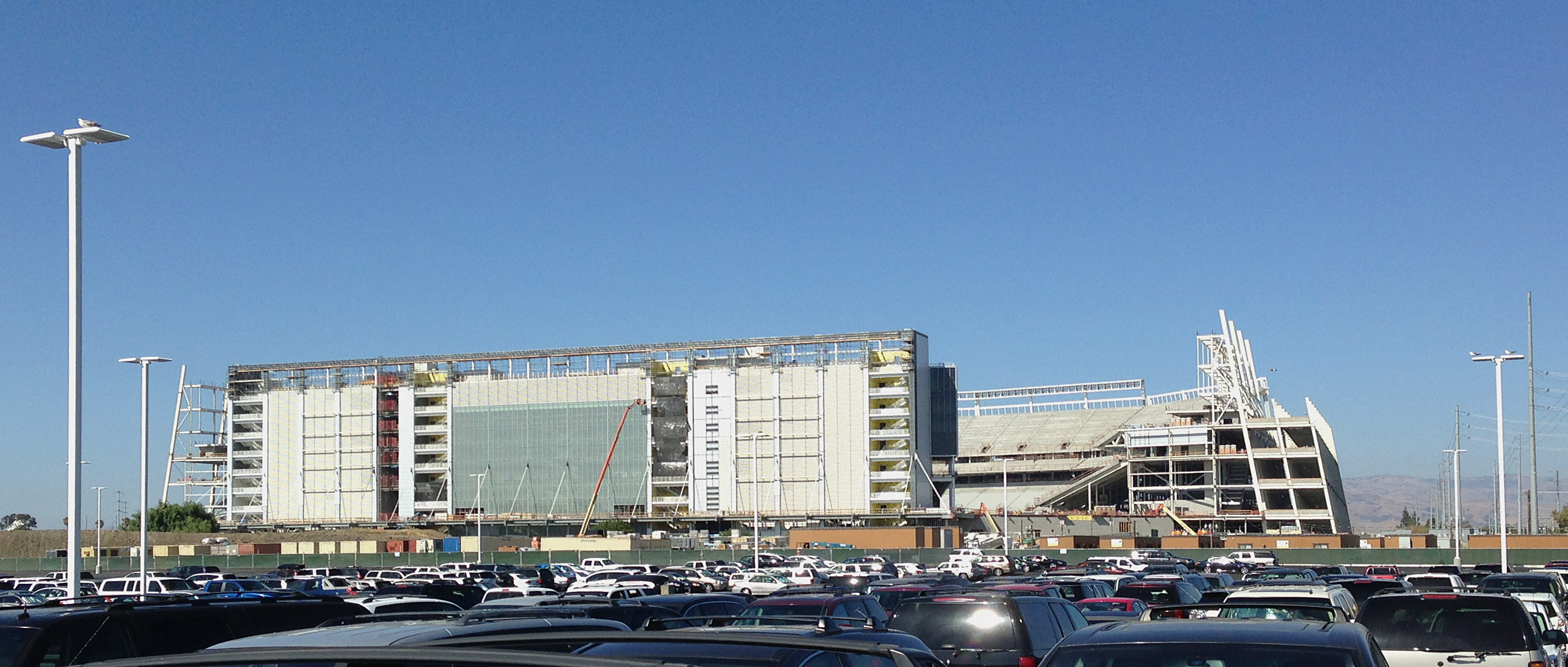
Levi's Stadium under construction, July 11, 2013

Construction began soon after funding for the stadium had been confirmed. The official groundbreaking took place on April 19, 2012. On July 30, 2012, the first steel beams for the stadium were laid down. The first seats in Levi's Stadium were installed on October 1, 2013.

Construction was halted on June 11, 2013, after a mechanic working on an elevator was struck by a counterweight and then fell down the shaft to his death. Work resumed two days later after officials from the California Occupational Safety and Health Administration (Cal/OSHA) declared the site safe, but as of October 2013, the accident remained under investigation.

The Santa Clara stadium was constructed on a city-owned parking lot on Tasman Drive, located adjacent to the north of California's Great America theme park and leased to Great America for overflow parking. As with Candlestick Park, there are relatively few amenities in the stadium's immediate vicinity for sports fans, besides the 49ers headquarters and training facility. The Santa Clara Convention Center is northwest of the stadium site and there are two hotels on Tasman Drive next to the convention center, but the closest significant concentration of hotels and restaurants is on the Mission College Boulevard corridor almost a mile to the south, on the other side of Great America.

== Opening ==
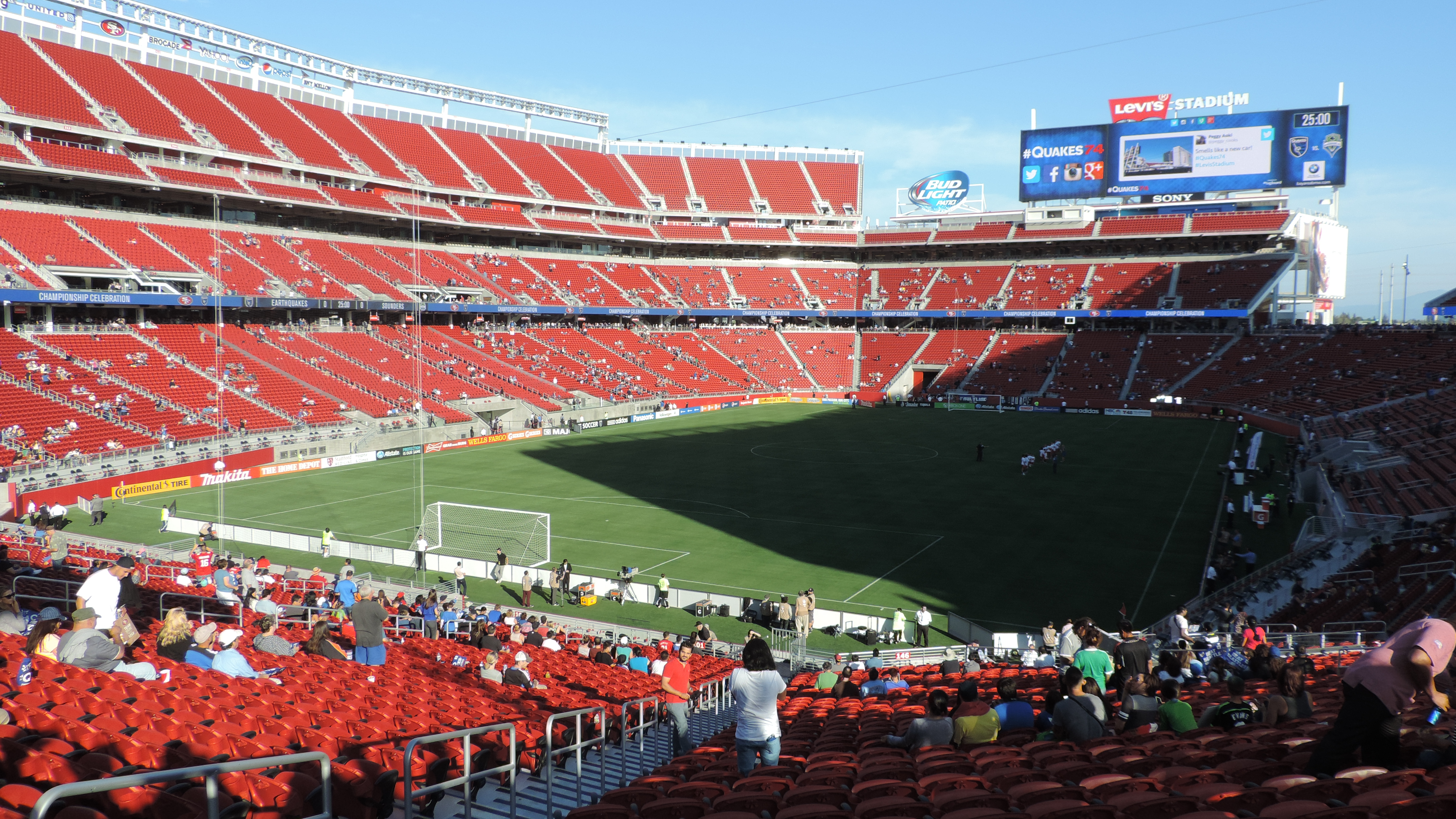
Levi's Stadium on August 2, 2014, hosting its first-ever game, a soccer match featuring the San Jose Earthquakes and Seattle Sounders FC.

The stadium opened on July 17, 2014. It was originally scheduled to open on July 11, but was pushed back due to construction delays. The first game played at the new stadium was a Major League Soccer match on August 2, 2014, where the San Jose Earthquakes defeated Seattle Sounders FC 1–0 before a crowd of 48,765. The inaugural goal was scored in the 42nd minute by Yannick Djaló.

On August 17, 2014, the 49ers lost their first preseason game, 34–0, against the Denver Broncos at Levi's Stadium. One fan at the game collapsed due to the heat and had to be rushed to a local hospital, where he died.

The first 49ers' regular-season game at the stadium was held during Week 2 on September 14, 2014, when the team hosted the Chicago Bears on Sunday Night Football. The Bears won the game 28–20 in front of a 49ers home record attendance of 70,799.

== Notable events ==
=== Super Bowls ===
==== Super Bowl 50 ====
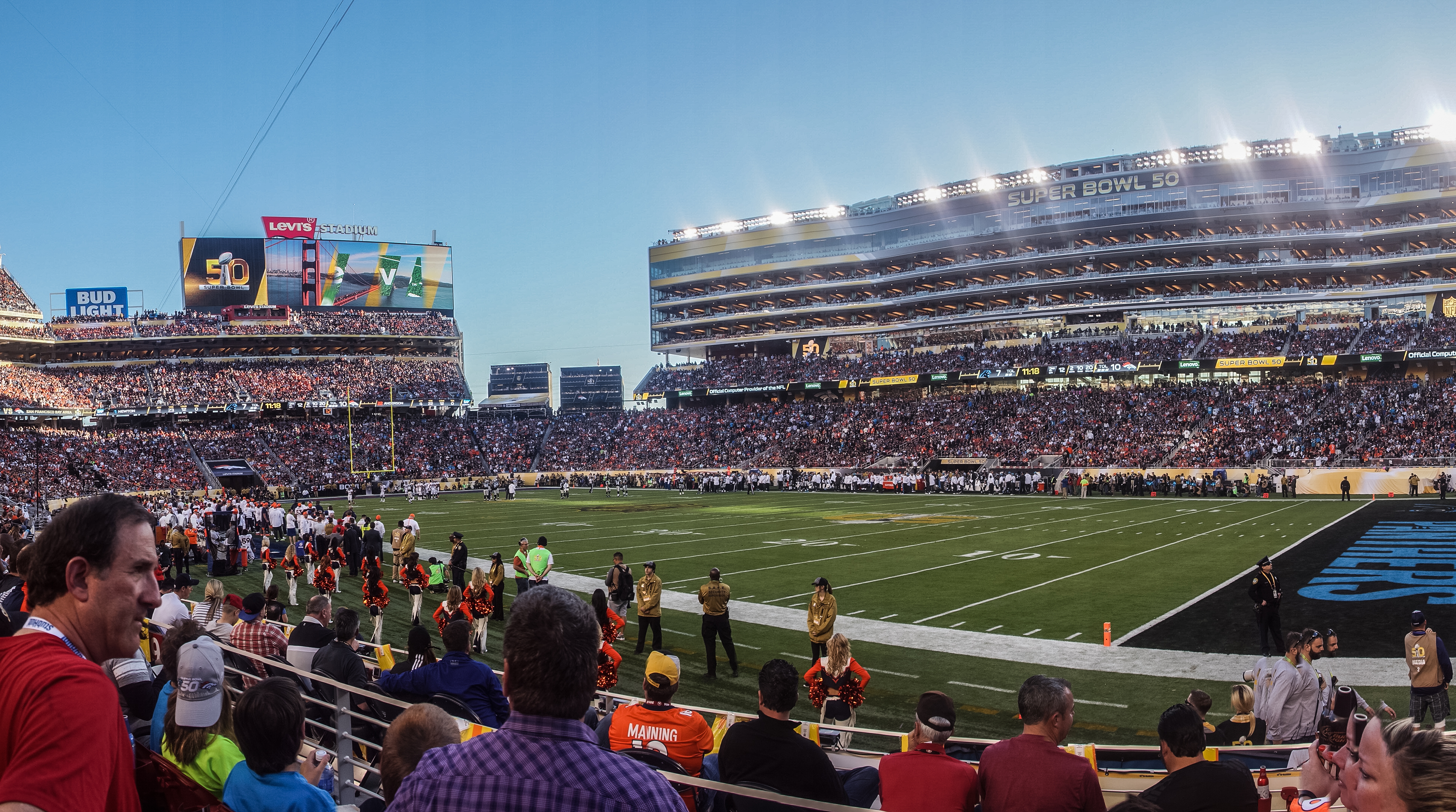
Super Bowl 50 in February 2016

Super Bowl 50 was held at the stadium on February 7, 2016; the Denver Broncos defeated the Carolina Panthers 24–10. Lady Gaga performed the national anthem, and Coldplay performed with Beyoncé and Bruno Mars at halftime.

==== Super Bowl LX ====
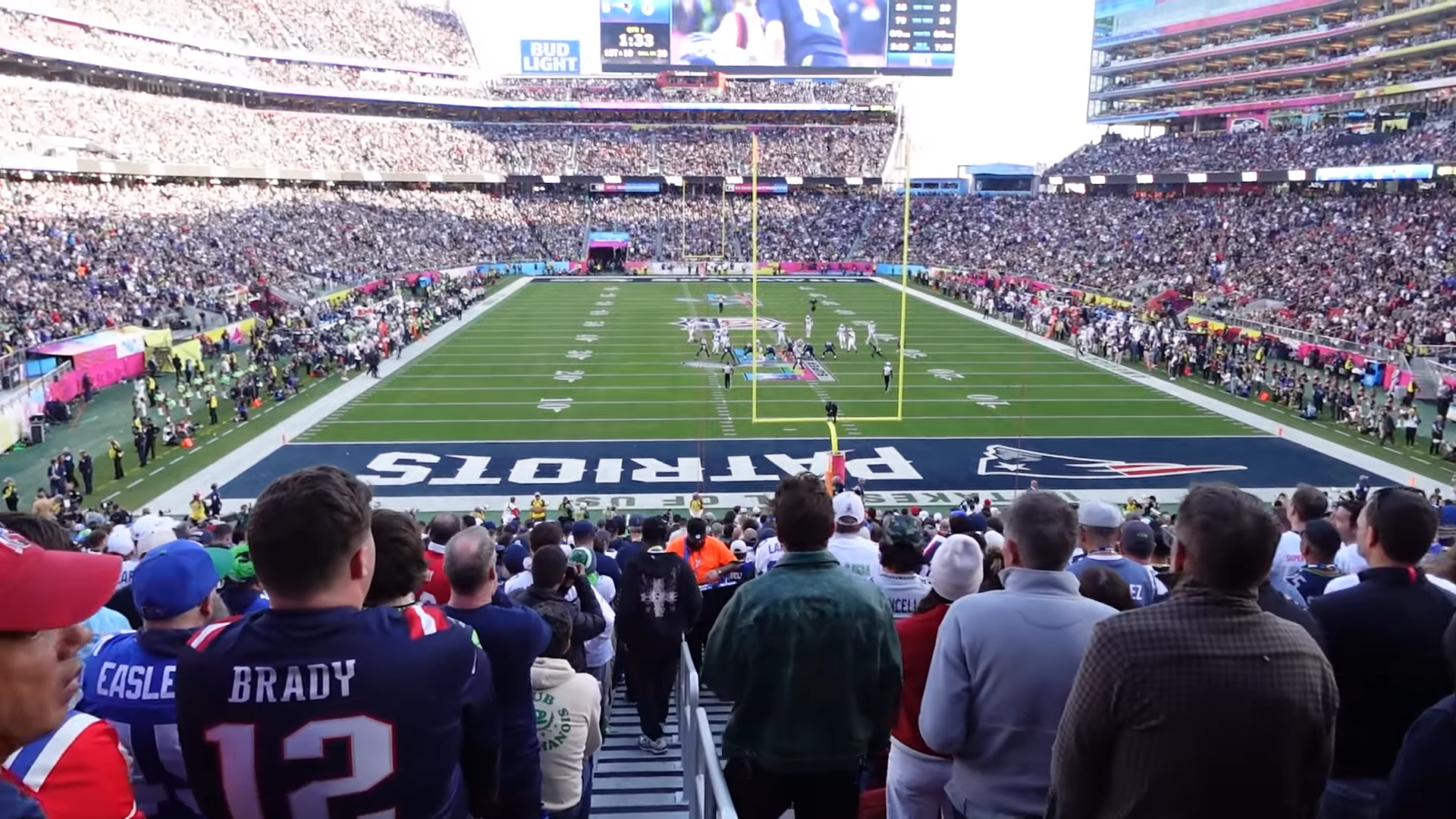
Super Bowl LX in February 2026

The venue hosted Super Bowl LX on February 8, 2026; the Seattle Seahawks defeated the New England Patriots 29–13 in a rematch of Super Bowl XLIX. Charlie Puth performed the national anthem, and Bad Bunny performed with Lady Gaga and Ricky Martin at halftime.

=== WrestleMania 31 ===
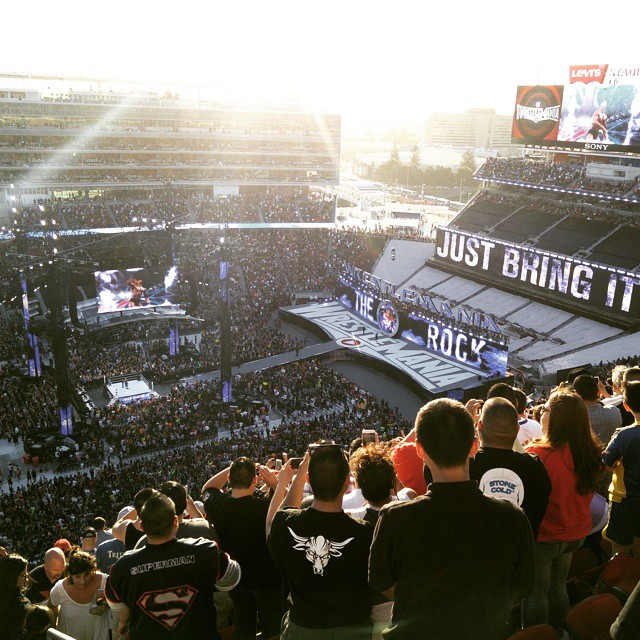
WrestleMania 31

The stadium hosted WWE's WrestleMania 31 on March 29, 2015, the first WrestleMania in Northern California and the sixth in the state. The area also hosted various activities in the week-long celebration leading up to the primary event. The show set a Levi's Stadium attendance record of 76,976, with $12.6 million in gate receipts.

=== Ice hockey ===
Levi's Stadium hosted the 2015 NHL Stadium Series' February 21 game between the Los Angeles Kings and San Jose Sharks; the Kings won 2–1 in front of 70,205.

=== Concerts ===
Date	Artist	Opening act(s)	Tour / Concert name	Attendance	Revenue	Notes
May 2, 2015	Kenny Chesney; Jason Aldean	Jake Owen; Cole Swindell; Old Dominion	The Big Revival Tour; The Burn It Down Tour	46,549 / 47,498	$4,765,582	
June 27, 2015	Grateful Dead	—N/a	Fare Thee Well: Celebrating 50 Years of the Grateful Dead	151,650 / 151,650	$21,549,139	50th Anniversary concerts
June 28, 2015	Grateful Dead	—N/a	Fare Thee Well: Celebrating 50 Years of the Grateful Dead	151,650 / 151,650	$21,549,139	50th Anniversary concerts
July 11, 2015	One Direction	Icona Pop	On the Road Again Tour	47,617 / 47,617	$4,531,686	
August 14, 2015	Taylor Swift	Vance Joy; Shawn Mendes	The 1989 World Tour	102,139 / 102,139	$13,031,146	Fifth Harmony were special guests on the August 14 show.
August 15, 2015	Taylor Swift	Vance Joy; Shawn Mendes	The 1989 World Tour	102,139 / 102,139	$13,031,146	Little Mix, Joan Baez, and Julia Roberts were special guests on the August 15 show.
August 29, 2015	Luke Bryan	Florida Georgia Line; Randy Houser; Thomas Rhett; Dustin Lynch; DJ Rock	Kick the Dust Up Tour	46,919 / 46,919	$3,819,758	
May 16, 2016	Beyoncé	DJ Khaled	The Formation World Tour	44,252 / 44,252	$6,201,845	
September 3, 2016	Coldplay	Alessia Cara; Bishop Briggs	A Head Full of Dreams Tour	52,404 / 52,404	$5,990,660	
August 6, 2016	Kenny Chesney	Miranda Lambert; Sam Hunt; Old Dominion	Spread the Love Tour	45,530 / 47,998	$3,728,449	
September 17, 2016	Beyoncé	DJ Drama	The Formation World Tour	44,015 / 44,015	$4,898,690	
May 17, 2017	U2	Mumford & Sons	The Joshua Tree Tour 2017	50,072 / 50,072	$6,268,805	
October 4, 2017	Coldplay	Tove Lo; Alina Baraz	A Head Full of Dreams Tour	48,341 / 48,341	$5,265,835	
May 11, 2018	Taylor Swift	Camila Cabello; Charli XCX	Taylor Swift's Reputation Stadium Tour	107,550 / 107,550	$14,006,963	With a $14 million take from 107,550 sold tickets at the venue, Swift topped her own gross and attendance counts set during The 1989 World Tour in 2015
May 12, 2018	Taylor Swift	Camila Cabello; Charli XCX	Taylor Swift's Reputation Stadium Tour	107,550 / 107,550	$14,006,963	With a $14 million take from 107,550 sold tickets at the venue, Swift topped her own gross and attendance counts set during The 1989 World Tour in 2015
September 29, 2018	Beyoncé; Jay-Z	Chloe X Halle and DJ Khaled	On the Run II Tour	47,235 / 47,235	$7,548,208	
August 18, 2019	The Rolling Stones	Vista Kicks	No Filter Tour	47,578 / 47,578	$11,496,719	This concert was originally scheduled to take place on May 18, 2019, but was postponed due to Mick Jagger recovering from a heart procedure.
May 15, 2022	Coldplay	H.E.R.	Music of the Spheres World Tour	50,791 / 50,791	$5,861,025	This concert was originally scheduled for April 23, 2022, but it was rescheduled due to logistical reasons.
July 29, 2022	Red Hot Chili Peppers	Beck; Thundercat	Global Stadium Tour	45,743 / 45,743	$6,402,979	
August 27, 2022	The Weeknd	Mike Dean; Snoh Aalegra	After Hours til Dawn Tour	49,227 / 49,227	$9,599,671	
October 8, 2022	Elton John	—N/a	Farewell Yellow Brick Road	77,554 / 77,554	$13,424,470	
October 9, 2022	Elton John	—N/a	Farewell Yellow Brick Road	77,554 / 77,554	$13,424,470	
July 28, 2023	Taylor Swift	Haim; Gracie Abrams	The Eras Tour			
July 29, 2023	Taylor Swift	Haim; Gracie Abrams	The Eras Tour			
August 14, 2023	Karol G	Agudelo	Mañana Será Bonito Tour	43,363 / 43,363	$6,988,710	
August 30, 2023	Beyoncé		Renaissance World Tour	49,613 / 49,613	$15,402,846	
September 16, 2023	Ed Sheeran	Russ; Maisie Peters	+–=÷× Tour	80,058 / 80,058		The show set an attendance record for the stadium.
May 17, 2024	Luke Combs		Growin’ Up And Gettin’ Old Tour			
May 18, 2024	Luke Combs		Growin’ Up And Gettin’ Old Tour			
July 17, 2024	The Rolling Stones	The Beaches	Hackney Diamonds Tour			
June 20, 2025	Metallica	Limp Bizkit; Ice Nine Kills	M72 World Tour			
June 22, 2025	Metallica	Pantera; Suicidal Tendencies	M72 World Tour			
July 8, 2025	The Weeknd	Playboi Carti; Mike Dean	After Hours til Dawn Tour	100,230 / 100,230	$17,087,714	
July 9, 2025	The Weeknd	Playboi Carti; Mike Dean	After Hours til Dawn Tour	100,230 / 100,230	$17,087,714	
August 1, 2025	Morgan Wallen	Miranda Lambert; Anne Wilson	I'm the Problem Tour			
August 2, 2025	Morgan Wallen	Brooks & Dunn; Anne Wilson	I'm the Problem Tour			
July 25, 2026	Ed Sheeran	Myles Smith; Sigrid; Aaron Rowe	Loop Tour			
August 5, 2026	AC/DC	The Pretty Reckless	Power Up Tour			
August 21, 2026	Karol G		Viajando Por El Mundo Tropitour			
August 22, 2026	Karol G		Viajando Por El Mundo Tropitour			
August 28, 2026	Usher; Chris Brown		The R&B Tour			
August 29, 2026	Usher; Chris Brown		The R&B Tour			
October 10, 2026	Bruno Mars	DJ Pee .Wee; Raye	The Romantic Tour			
October 11, 2026	Bruno Mars	DJ Pee .Wee; Raye	The Romantic Tour			
May 19, 2027	Noah Kahan		The Last of the Bugs World Tour			Upcoming Event
May 22, 2027	Stray Kids		Run It World Tour			

=== Soccer ===
On July 31, 2014, the San Jose Earthquakes agreed to play one match per year for five years at Levi's Stadium. On September 6, 2014, an international friendly between Mexico and Chile was held. The stadium also hosted a 2015 International Champions Cup match between Barcelona and Manchester United on July 25, 2015, when United won 3–1. A 2016 International Champions Cup match featured Milan and Liverpool on July 30, 2016, with Liverpool winning 2–0.

In June 2016, Levi's Stadium hosted four games at the Copa América Centenario; the opening match between United States and Colombia, two other group stage matches, and a quarterfinal where Chile defeated Mexico.

A 2017 International Champions Cup game was held on July 23, 2017, when Manchester United defeated Real Madrid 1–1 (2–1 in a penalty shoot-out).

On July 26, 2017, the United States defeated Jamaica 2–1 to win their sixth CONCACAF Gold Cup title.

On March 23, 2018, Mexico won 3–0 against Iceland in a friendly in both teams' preparation for the 2018 FIFA World Cup.

A 2018 International Champions Cup game was held on August 4, 2018, when Milan defeated Barcelona 1–0 with a last second goal by André Silva.

On May 12, 2019, the United States women's national soccer team played its first send-off series match ahead of the 2019 FIFA Women's World Cup, defeating South Africa 3–0.

Date	Winning Team	Result	Losing Team	Tournament	Spectators
August 2, 2014	(United States) San Jose Earthquakes	1–0	(United States) Seattle Sounders FC	MLS Regular Season	48,765
September 6, 2014	Mexico	0–0	Chile	International Friendly	67,175
May 24, 2015	(United States) San Jose Earthquakes	1–1	(United States) Orlando City SC	MLS Regular Season	36,224
July 25, 2015	(England) Manchester United	3–1	(Spain) Barcelona	2015 International Champions Cup	68,416
June 3, 2016	Colombia	2–0	United States	Copa América Centenario Group A	67,439
June 6, 2016	Argentina	2–1	Chile	Copa América Centenario Group D	69,451
June 13, 2016	Uruguay	3–0	Jamaica	Copa América Centenario Group C	40,166
June 18, 2016	Chile	7–0	Mexico	Copa América Centenario quarterfinals	70,547
July 30, 2016	(England) Liverpool	2–0	(Italy) Milan	2016 International Champions Cup	30,758
July 23, 2017	(England) Manchester United	1–1 (2–1 pen.)	(Spain) Real Madrid	2017 International Champions Cup	65,109
July 26, 2017	United States	2–1	Jamaica	2017 CONCACAF Gold Cup Final	63,032
March 23, 2018	Mexico	3–0	Iceland	International Friendly	68,917
July 22, 2018	(United States) San Jose Earthquakes	0–0	(England) Manchester United	Club Friendly	32,549
August 4, 2018	(Italy) Milan	1–0	(Spain) Barcelona	2018 International Champions Cup	51,391
March 26, 2019	Mexico	4–2	Paraguay	International Friendly	50,317
May 12, 2019	United States	3–0	South Africa	Women's International Friendly	22,788
July 20, 2019	(Portugal) Benfica	3–0	(Mexico) Guadalajara	2019 International Champions Cup	15,724
September 27, 2022	Colombia	3–2	Mexico	International Friendly	67,311
May 6, 2023	(United States) San Jose Earthquakes	2–1	(United States) Los Angeles FC	MLS Regular Season	45,112
July 2, 2023	Jamaica	5–0	Saint Kitts and Nevis	2023 CONCACAF Gold Cup Group A	60,347
July 2, 2023	Qatar	1–0	Mexico	2023 CONCACAF Gold Cup Group B	60,347
May 4, 2024	(United States) San Jose Earthquakes	3–1	(United States) Los Angeles FC	MLS Regular Season	43,774
June 22, 2024	Venezuela	2–1	Ecuador	2024 Copa América Group B	29,864
July 2, 2024	Brazil	1–1	Colombia	2024 Copa América Group D	70,971
July 24, 2024	(England) Chelsea	2–2	(Wales) Wrexham	Friendly	32,724
July 27, 2024	(United States) San Jose Earthquakes	1–1 (4–3 pen.)	(Mexico) Guadalajara	2024 Leagues Cup	50,675
July 2, 2025	Mexico	1–0	Honduras	2025 CONCACAF Gold Cup semifinal	70,975
September 13, 2025	(United States) Los Angeles FC	4–2	(United States) San Jose Earthquakes	MLS Regular Season	50,978
September 19, 2026	(United States) San Jose Earthquakes	2–2	(United States) Los Angeles FC	MLS Regular Season	40,518

==== 2026 FIFA World Cup ====
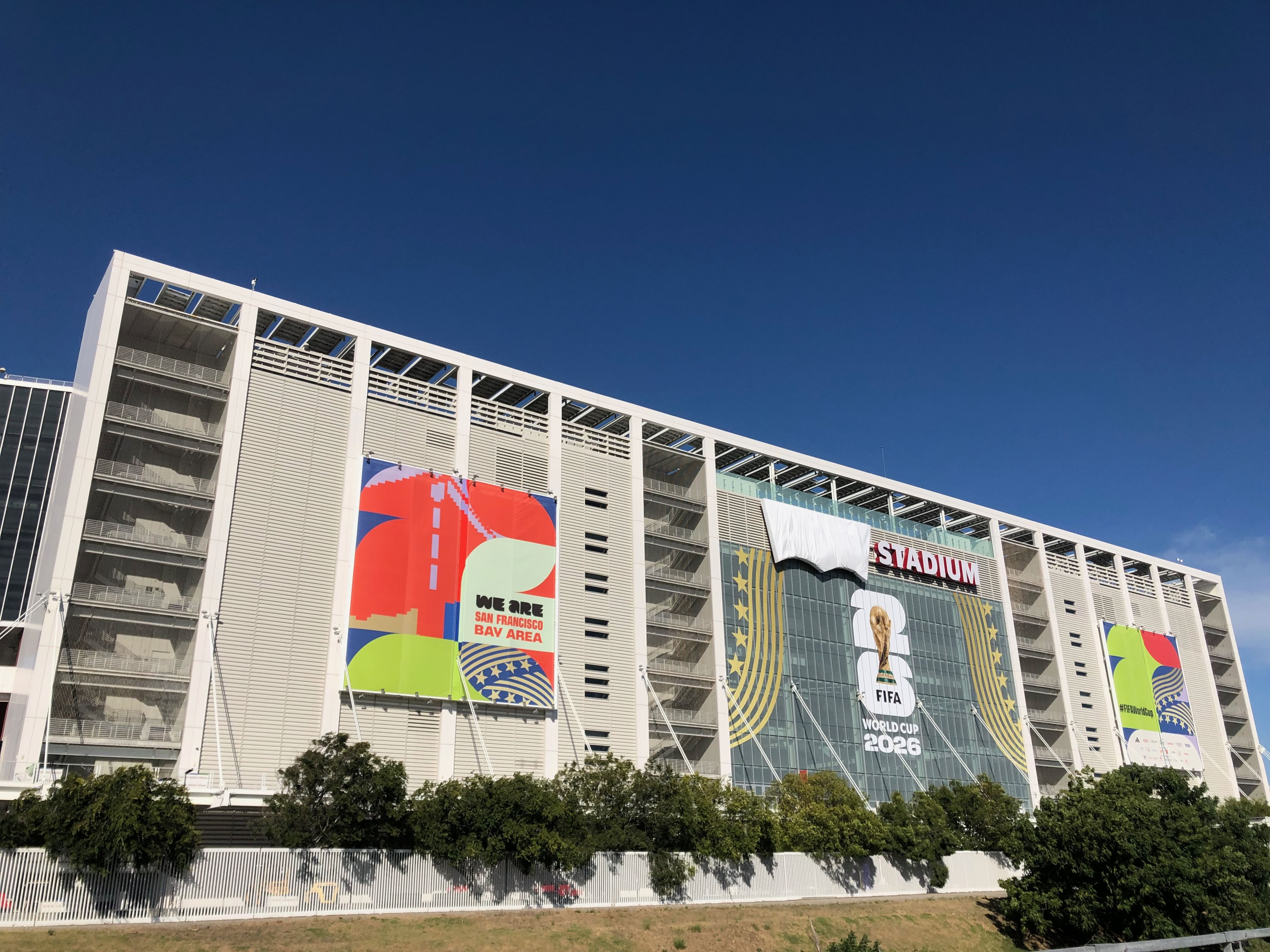
Levi’s Stadium during the 2026 FIFA World Cup. The stadium’s name was temporarily covered and was known as San Francisco Bay Arena Stadium for the duration of the tournament.

Levi's Stadium was one of 16 venues which hosted matches during the 2026 FIFA World Cup. It was one of eleven US venues for the tournament and was also one of two venues in California which was hosting matches, the other being SoFi Stadium in Los Angeles. During the event, the stadium was temporarily renamed to San Francisco Bay Area Stadium in accordance with FIFA's policy on corporate-sponsored names and the Levi's branding and logos throughout the venue were covered or removed for the duration of the tournament. The stadium hosted six matches: five group stage matches and one round of 32 match, which saw the United States advance to the Round of 16.

Date	Time (UTC−7)	Team #1	Res.	Team #2	Round	Attendance
June 13, 2026	12:00	Qatar	1–1	Switzerland	Group B	67,966
June 16, 2026	21:00	Austria	3–1	Jordan	Group J	68,527
June 19, 2026	20:00	Turkey	0–1	Paraguay	Group D	68,827
June 22, 2026	20:00	Jordan	1–2	Algeria	Group J	68,371
June 25, 2026	19:00	Paraguay	0–0	Australia	Group D	68,827
July 1, 2026	17:00	United States	2–0	Bosnia and Herzegovina	Round of 32	68,827

=== College football ===
Levi's Stadium has hosted numerous college football games. The first college game played there was an October 2014 regular season game between the Oregon Ducks and the California Golden Bears, in which Oregon won. The stadium was the home of the Redbox Bowl (formerly the Foster Farms Bowl) and it served as the host for the Pac-12 Championship Game from 2014 through 2019. In January 2019, Levi's Stadium hosted the 2019 College Football Playoff National Championship, marking the first time the College Football Playoff title game was played there.

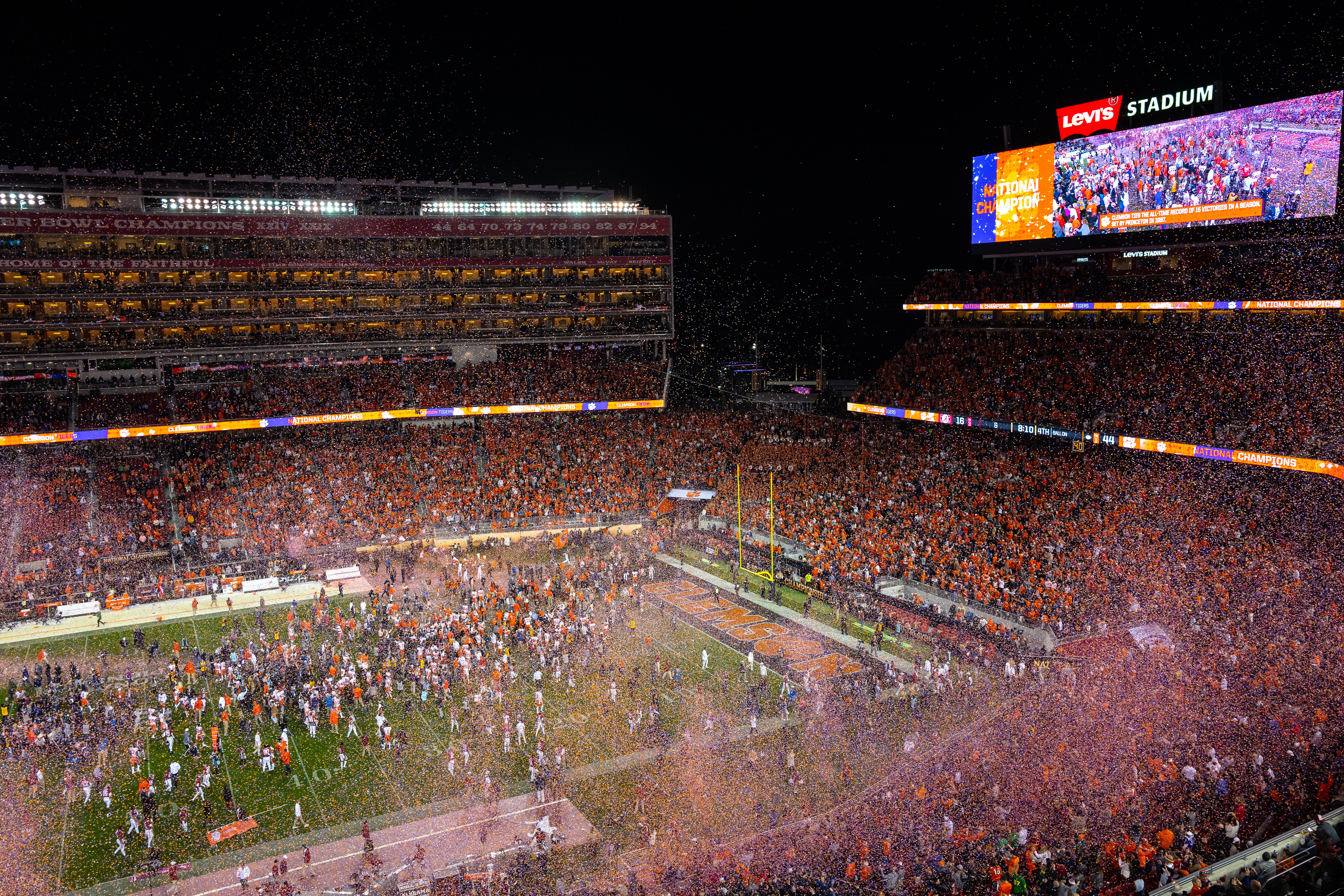
The 2019 CFP National Championship on January 7, 2019.

Date	Winning Team	Result	Losing Team	Game	Spectators
October 24, 2014	6 Oregon Ducks	59–41	California Golden Bears		55,575
December 5, 2014	2 Oregon Ducks	51–13	7 Arizona Wildcats	Pac-12 Championship Game	45,618
December 30, 2014	Stanford Cardinal	45–21	Maryland Terrapins	Foster Farms Bowl	34,780
December 5, 2015	7 Stanford Cardinal	41–22	20 USC Trojans	Pac-12 Championship Game	58,476
December 26, 2015	Nebraska Cornhuskers	37–28	UCLA Bruins	Foster Farms Bowl	33,527
December 2, 2016	4 Washington Huskies	41–10	8 Colorado Buffaloes	Pac-12 Championship Game	47,118
December 28, 2016	19 Utah Utes	26–24	Indiana Hoosiers	Foster Farms Bowl	27,608
December 1, 2017	10 USC Trojans	31–28	12 Stanford Cardinal	Pac-12 Championship Game	48,031
December 27, 2017	Purdue Boilermakers	38–35	Arizona Wildcats	Foster Farms Bowl	28,426
October 13, 2018	Army Black Knights	52–3	San Jose State Spartans		15,627
November 30, 2018	11 Washington Huskies	10–3	17 Utah Utes	Pac-12 Championship Game	35,134
December 30, 2018	Oregon Ducks	7–6	Michigan State Spartans	Redbox Bowl	30,212
January 7, 2019	2 Clemson Tigers	44–16	1 Alabama Crimson Tide	CFP National Championship Game	74,814
December 6, 2019	13 Oregon Ducks	37–15	5 Utah Utes	Pac-12 Championship Game	38,679
December 30, 2019	California Golden Bears	35–20	Illinois Fighting Illini	Redbox Bowl	30,212

=== 2031 and 2033 Rugby World Cups ===
The San Francisco Bay Area is amongst the candidates being considered for hosting matches during the 2031 Rugby World Cup and 2033 Women's Rugby World Cup.

=== Mass vaccination site ===
A mass COVID-19 vaccination site opened Tuesday February 9, 2021, at Levi's Stadium, with California Governor Gavin Newsom, representatives of the San Francisco 49ers, and Santa Clara County officials on hand.

== See also ==
- Candlestick Park
- Kezar Stadium
- Lists of stadiums

Events and tenants
Preceded by Candlestick Park; 1971 – 2013	Home of the San Francisco 49ers 2014 – present	Succeeded by current
Preceded by University of Phoenix Stadium; Caesars Superdome	Host of the Super Bowl; 50 2016; LX 2026	Succeeded by NRG Stadium; SoFi Stadium
Preceded by Mercedes-Benz Stadium	Home of the College Football Playoff National Championship; 2019	Succeeded by Mercedes-Benz Superdome
Preceded by AT&T Park	Home of the Foster Farms Bowl; 2014–present	Succeeded by current
Preceded by Sun Devil Stadium	Home of the Pac-12 Football Championship Game; 2015–2019	Succeeded by Allegiant Stadium
Preceded by Mercedes-Benz Superdome; Lincoln Financial Field	Host of NFC Championship Game; 2020; 2024	Succeeded by Lambeau Field; Lincoln Financial Field
Preceded by Mercedes-Benz Superdome	Host of WrestleMania; 2015 (31)	Succeeded by AT&T Stadium
