= Santa Clara–Great America station =

Railway station in Santa Clara, California

Santa Clara, CA/Great America
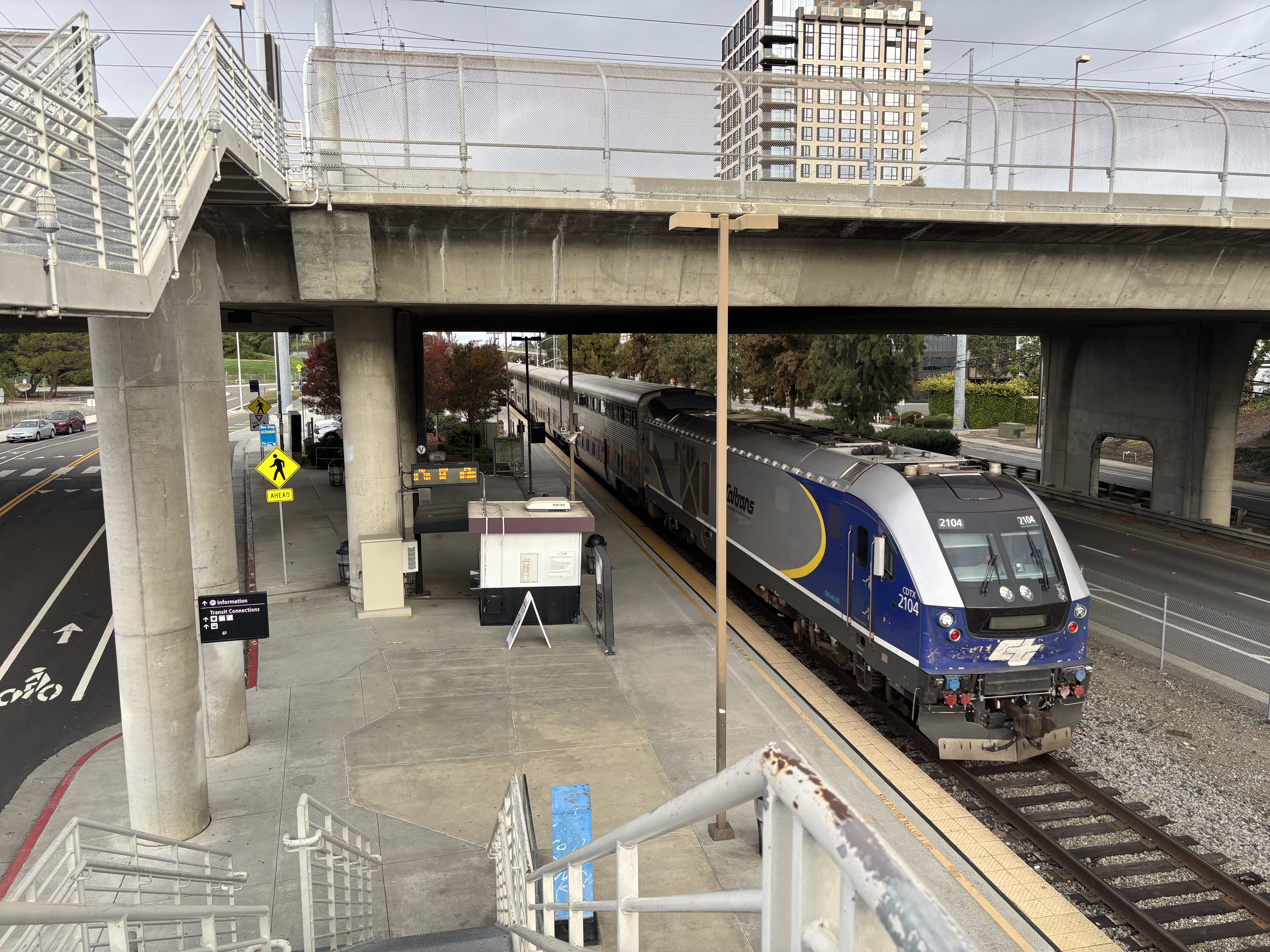
- Santa Clara – Great America station in 2025

General information
- Location: 5099 Stars & Stripes Drive; Santa Clara, California; United States
- Coordinates: 37.406645°N 121.96688°W
- Owner: City of Santa Clara and Union Pacific Railroad
- Line: UP Coast Subdivision
- Platforms: 1 side platform
- Tracks: 1
- Connections: (at Lick Mill station); ACE Shuttle: Brown, Green, Grey, Orange, Purple, Red, Violet, Yellow

Construction
- Parking: 189 spaces
- Cycle facilities: 12 lockers
- Accessible: Yes

Other information
- Station code: Amtrak: GAC

History
- Opened: May 21, 1993

Passengers
- FY 2025: 83,287 (Amtrak)

Services
Preceding station	Amtrak	Following station
Fremont toward Auburn	Capitol Corridor	Santa Clara–University toward San Jose
Coast Starlight does not stop here
Preceding station	Altamont Corridor Express	Following station
Fremont toward Stockton	San Jose – Stockton	Santa Clara toward San Jose
Location

Santa Clara–Great America station (called Great America station by ACE) is a train station in Santa Clara, California. It hosts Amtrak's Capitol Corridor trains and Altamont Corridor Express (ACE) trains. The station is close to Levi's Stadium and California's Great America. Of the 75 California stations served by Amtrak, Great America was the 20th-busiest in FY2019, boarding or detraining an average of about 533 passengers daily.

Great America was proposed as a station for the new Capitols service in 1990. The Capitols began operation in 1991; Santa Clara–Great America station opened as an infill station on May 21, 1993.

== Transit connections ==
Santa Clara Valley Transportation Authority (VTA) provides connecting shuttles to employers in Sunnyvale, Santa Clara, Milpitas, and North San Jose.

The station does not offer a direct connection to the VTA light rail, but the system's Lick Mill station is located 1/5 mile (0.32 km) to the east and Great America station (located at the California's Great America theme park) is 3/5 mile (0.97 km) to the west.
