= List of VTA bus routes =

The following is a list of Santa Clara Valley Transportation Authority bus routes. Route numbers are classified as follows:

- Lines 1-99 are standard local bus routes, which feature many, closely spaced stops. These lines serve a smaller area, such as connecting transit centers to the surrounding community or Downtown San Jose to nearby neighborhoods.
- Lines 100-199 are express services and primarily operate during peak periods only. These lines operate express mainly on freeways and provide fewer stops than local services, mainly at train stations and major transfer points in Santa Clara County. These also charge higher fares than standard bus routes.
- Lines 200-203 are late-night routes that substitute portions of light rail lines.
- Lines 246-299 are school services that operate limited service to several area high schools in conjunction with their bell schedules.
- Lines 500-599 are limited stop "Rapid" branded routes.
- Lines 800-899 are commuter rail shuttles that operate mainly during peak periods. These lines operate from the Great America ACE/Amtrak station and serve nearby high-tech businesses and industrial parks.
- Lines 900-999 are intercity routes operated in conjunction with other agencies.

VTA embarked on a large network redesign that was implemented on December 28, 2019. This eliminated the DASH shuttle, Almaden Light Rail shuttle, limited-branded bus service, community bus service, and many express routes but established a core frequent network and increased service on numerous local bus routes.

In 2025, VTA's bus system had a ridership of 22,700,800, or about 76,100 per weekday as of the first quarter of 2026.

== Regular bus service ==
Santa Clara VTA operates numerous bus lines that operate on most major thoroughfares throughout Santa Clara County. Several of these lines converge at key transfer points, including Downtown San Jose, several Caltrain stations between Palo Alto and Gilroy, the Milpitas and Berryessa BART stations, and most light rail stations. Some lines also provide connecting services to other transit agencies, including AC Transit, Dumbarton Express, Monterey-Salinas Transit, and SamTrans.

Included in this listing are VTA's limited-stop Rapid services, as those levy the same cash fares as regular local buses.

Line Number	Direction	Terminals		Days of Operation	Schedule Information	Major Destinations	Notes
20	East-West	Sunnyvale; Sunnyvale station	Milpitas; Milpitas station	Weekdays	Line 20	Downtown Sunnyvale, North Santa Clara, Mission College, Orchard station	
21	East-West	Palo Alto; Stanford Shopping Center	Santa Clara; Santa Clara Transit Center	Daily	Line 21	Palo Alto Transit Center, San Antonio station, San Antonio Center, Downtown Mountain View, Middlefield station, Downtown Sunnyvale, Santa Clara University	
22	East-West	Palo Alto; Palo Alto station	San Jose; Eastridge Transit Center	Daily	Line 22	Stanford University, San Antonio Center, Santa Clara Transit Center, Santa Clara University, SAP Center, Downtown San Jose, San Jose State University, Eastridge Mall	Part of the Frequent Network; For a limited-stop version of this service, see Rapid 522.
23	East-West	Cupertino; De Anza College	San Jose; Alum Rock Transit Center	Daily	Line 23	Westfield Valley Fair, Santana Row, Downtown San Jose, San Jose State University	Part of the Frequent Network; For a limited-stop version of this service, see Rapid 523.
25	East-West	San Jose; Valley Medical Center (short turn)	San Jose; Alum Rock Transit Center	Daily	Line 25	San Jose City College, Fruitdale station, Tamien station	Part of the Frequent Network; Service west of Valley Medical Center operates at half frequency
25	East-West	Cupertino; De Anza College	San Jose; Alum Rock Transit Center	Daily	Line 25	San Jose City College, Fruitdale station, Tamien station	Part of the Frequent Network; Service west of Valley Medical Center operates at half frequency
26	East-West	San Jose; Westgate Center (Weekday short turn & all weekend/holiday trips)	San Jose; Eastridge Transit Center	Daily	Line 26	Downtown Campbell, Pruneyard Shopping Center, Curtner station	Part of the Frequent Network; Weekday service between Westgate and West Valley College operates at half frequency
26	East-West	Saratoga; West Valley College (Select weekday trips)	San Jose; Eastridge Transit Center	Daily	Line 26	Downtown Campbell, Pruneyard Shopping Center, Curtner station	Part of the Frequent Network; Weekday service between Westgate and West Valley College operates at half frequency
27	East-West	Campbell; Winchester Transit Center	San Jose; Santa Teresa station	Daily	Line 27	Downtown Los Gatos, Good Samaritan Hospital, Princeton Plaza, Westfield Oakridge, Blossom Hill station (light rail), Cottle station, Kaiser San Jose	Weekend and holiday service bypasses Los Gatos Civic Center via Los Gatos-Saratoga Rd
31	North-South	San Jose; Eastridge Transit Center	San Jose; Evergreen Valley College	Weekdays, Saturdays	Line 31	Eastridge Mall	
37	East-West	Saratoga; West Valley College	San Jose; Capitol station (light rail)	Weekdays	Line 37	Winchester Transit Center	
39	North-South	San Jose; Eastridge Transit Center	San Jose; The Villages	Daily	Line 39	Eastridge Mall, Evergreen Village Square, Evergreen Valley College	
40	North-South	Mountain View; Mountain View station	Los Altos Hills; Foothill College (Weekdays & Saturdays)	Daily	Line 40	San Antonio Center, Googleplex, Shoreline Amphitheatre, Downtown Mountain View	
40	North-South	Mountain View; Mountain View station	Los Altos; San Antonio Rd & Lyell St (Sundays & holidays)	Daily	Line 40	San Antonio Center, Googleplex, Shoreline Amphitheatre, Downtown Mountain View	
42	North-South	San Jose; Evergreen Valley College	San Jose; Santa Teresa station	Weekdays	Line 42		
47	East-West	Milpitas; McCarthy Ranch (Weekends & holidays)	Milpitas; Milpitas station	Daily	Line 47	Kaiser Milpitas, Downtown Milpitas, Milpitas Square Shopping Center	Weekday service to Alder Station operates in a one-way clockwise loop south of SR-237 via Bellew Dr, Barber Ln, Alder Dr, and McCarthy Blvd
47	East-West	Milpitas; Alder station (Weekdays)	Milpitas; Milpitas station	Daily	Line 47	Kaiser Milpitas, Downtown Milpitas, Milpitas Square Shopping Center	Weekday service to Alder Station operates in a one-way clockwise loop south of SR-237 via Bellew Dr, Barber Ln, Alder Dr, and McCarthy Blvd
51	North-South	Mountain View; Moffett Field	Cupertino; De Anza College (short turn)	Weekdays	Line 51	Downtown Mountain View, El Camino Hospital	Service between De Anza College and West Valley College operates at half frequency
51	North-South	Mountain View; Moffett Field	Saratoga; West Valley College	Weekdays	Line 51	Downtown Mountain View, El Camino Hospital	Service between De Anza College and West Valley College operates at half frequency
52	North-South	Mountain View; Mountain View station	Los Altos Hills; Foothill College	Weekdays	Line 52	Downtown Mountain View	
53	East-West	Sunnyvale; Sunnyvale station	Santa Clara; Santa Clara Transit Center	Weekdays	Line 53	Downtown Sunnyvale, Kaiser Santa Clara, Santa Clara University	
55	North-South	Santa Clara; Old Ironsides station	Cupertino; De Anza College	Daily	Line 55	Downtown Sunnyvale, Reamwood station	Select weekday northbound trips deviate from Sunnyvale-Saratoga Rd to serve Fremont High School via Fremont Ave, Hollenbeck Ave, and Remington Dr; For a limited-stop version of this service, see Rapid 523.
56	North-South	Sunnyvale; Lockheed Martin Transit Center (Weekdays)	San Jose; Monterey Rd & Old Tully Rd	Daily	Line 56	Borregas station (weekdays only), Crossman station (weekdays only), Fair Oaks station, Apple Park, Westgate Center, Hamilton station, Tamien station	
56	North-South	Sunnyvale; Fair Oaks Ave & Tasman Dr (Weekends & holidays)	San Jose; Monterey Rd & Old Tully Rd	Daily	Line 56	Borregas station (weekdays only), Crossman station (weekdays only), Fair Oaks station, Apple Park, Westgate Center, Hamilton station, Tamien station	
57	North-South	Santa Clara; Old Ironsides station	Saratoga; West Valley College	Daily	Line 57	California's Great America, Levi's Stadium, Mission College (weekdays only), Westgate Center	Part of the Frequent Network
59	North-South	San Jose; Baypointe station	San Jose; Valley Medical Center	Daily	Line 59	Alviso, Old Ironsides station, California's Great America, Levi's Stadium, Mission College (weekdays only), Santa Clara Transit Center, Santa Clara University, Westfield Valley Fair, Santana Row	
60	North-South	Milpitas; Milpitas station	Campbell; Winchester Transit Center	Daily	Line 60	Metro/Airport station, San Jose International Airport, PayPal Park, Santa Clara Transit Center, Santa Clara University, Westfield Valley Fair, Santana Row, Downtown Campbell	Part of the Frequent Network; Serves San Jose International Airport, boardings free at airport terminals
61	North-South	San Jose; Sierra Rd & Piedmont Rd	San Jose; Good Samaritan Hospital	Daily	Line 61	Berryessa station (light rail), Berryessa/North San José station, San Jose Civic Center, Valley Medical Center, San Jose City College, Bascom station, Pruneyard Shopping Center	Part of the Frequent Network; Bidirectional loop around Bascom Ave & Union Ave to Good Samaritan Hospital, alternating between clockwise and counterclockwise at half frequency
64A	North-South	San Jose; McKee Rd & White Rd	San Jose; Ohlone/Chynoweth station	Daily	Line 64A	McKee station, San Jose State University, Downtown San Jose, SAP Center, San Jose Diridon station, Willow Glen, Almaden Valley, Westfield Oakridge	Combines with 64B to provide Frequent service north and east of San Jose Diridon; Replaces discontinued Almaden Shuttle light rail line
64B	North-South	San Jose; McKee Rd & White Rd	San Jose; Almaden Expwy & Camden Ave	Daily	Line 64B	McKee station, San Jose State University, Downtown San Jose, SAP Center, San Jose Diridon station, Princeton Plaza, South San Jose, Almaden Valley	Combines with 64A to provide Frequent service north and east of San Jose Diridon; Evening and weekend/holiday trips operate between Almaden & Camden and San Jose State
66	North-South	Milpitas; Dixon Rd & Milpitas Blvd	San Jose; Santa Teresa station	Daily	Line 66	Milpitas station, Great Mall, San Jose State University, Downtown San Jose, Capitol station (Caltrain), Snell station, Kaiser San Jose	Part of the Frequent Network
68	North-South	San Jose; Diridon station	Gilroy; Gilroy station	Daily	Line 68	Downtown San Jose, San Jose State University, Capitol station (Caltrain), Cottle station, Kaiser San Jose, Santa Teresa station, Morgan Hill station, San Martin station	Part of the Frequent Network; For a limited-stop version of this service, see Rapid 568.
70	North-South	San Jose; Berryessa/North San José station (short turn)	San Jose; Capitol station (light rail)	Daily	Line 70	Hostetter station, Eastridge Mall	Part of the Frequent Network; Service north of Berryessa/North San José station operates at half frequency
70	North-South	Milpitas; Milpitas station	San Jose; Capitol station (light rail)	Daily	Line 70	Hostetter station, Eastridge Mall	Part of the Frequent Network; Service north of Berryessa/North San José station operates at half frequency
71	North-South	Milpitas; Milpitas station	San Jose; Eastridge Transit Center	Daily	Line 71	Eastridge Mall	Part of the Frequent Network
72	North-South	San Jose; 2nd St & Bassett St	San Jose; Monterey Rd & Senter Rd	Daily	Line 72	Downtown San Jose, San Jose State University, South San Jose	Part of the Frequent Network; Route 72 operates via McLaughlin Ave; Route 73 operates via Senter Rd
73	North-South	San Jose; 2nd St & Bassett St	San Jose; Monterey Rd & Senter Rd	Daily	Line 73	Downtown San Jose, San Jose State University, South San Jose	Part of the Frequent Network; Route 72 operates via McLaughlin Ave; Route 73 operates via Senter Rd
77	North-South	Milpitas; Milpitas station	San Jose; Eastridge Transit Center	Daily	Line 77	Berryessa/North San José station, Eastridge Mall	Part of the Frequent Network
83	North-South	San Jose; Ohlone/Chynoweth station	San Jose; Almaden Expwy & Via Valiente	Weekdays	Line 83	Westfield Oakridge, Almaden Valley	Operates in a one-way clockwise loop south of Almaden & Via Valiente to McKean Rd.
84	North-South	Gilroy; St. Louise Hospital	Gilroy; Gilroy station	Daily	Line 84	Gilroy Outlets, Valley Health Center Gilroy, Gilroy Crossing	Lines form a two way loop around Gilroy station.
85	North-South	Gilroy; St. Louise Hospital	Gilroy; Gilroy station	Daily	Line 85	West Gilroy	Lines form a two way loop around Gilroy station.
86	North-South	Gilroy; Gilroy station	Gilroy; Gavilan College	Weekdays	Line 86		
87	North-South	Morgan Hill; Burnett Ave at Sobrato High School	Morgan Hill; Civic Center	Weekday Peak Periods	Line 87	Morgan Hill station	
89	North-South	Palo Alto; California Avenue station	Palo Alto; V.A. Hospital	Weekdays	Line 89	Stanford Research Park	

=== Rapid bus service ===
The VTA operates four rapid bus routes, most notably the Rapid 522, which serves as a limited-stop service along El Camino Real between Palo Alto and east San Jose. The route serves 30 stops, substantially fewer than local Route 22, which operates along the same corridor. Rapid 522 provides connections to numerous bus and light rail services throughout Santa Clara County.

Rapid 522 incorporates features commonly associated with bus rapid transit systems, including queue-jump lanes, transit signal priority, and enhanced bus stops. On January 6, 2014, VTA expanded weekday and Saturday service hours and introduced Sunday service.

In March 2014, VTA began construction of the Santa Clara–Alum Rock Bus Rapid Transit project. The project upgraded part of the Rapid 522 corridor between Eastridge Transit Center and the SAP Center at San Jose to full BRT operation, including enhanced stations, transit signal priority, all-door boarding, off-board fare payment, and increased service frequencies. VTA has also studied extending BRT improvements to the remainder of the El Camino Real corridor through the El Camino Real Bus Rapid Transit Project.

In October 2021, VTA replaced Express Route 168 with Route 568 between Gilroy and San Jose. Route 568 operates on weekdays with fewer stops than Route 68, providing faster service between the two cities while primarily following Monterey Road.

Line Number	Direction	Terminals		Days of Operation	Schedule Information	Major Destinations	Notes
Rapid 500	North-South	San Jose; Berryessa/North San José station	San Jose; Diridon station	Daily	Line 500	Downtown San Jose, San Jose State University	Part of the Frequent Network.; Replaced the DASH downtown shuttle and Express 181.; For local service along Santa Clara St, see lines 22, 64A, 64B, or 68.; For local service along 10th St and 11th St, see line 66.; For local service along Taylor St, see line 61.
Rapid 522	East-West	Palo Alto; Palo Alto station	San Jose; Eastridge Transit Center	Daily	Line 522	Stanford University, San Antonio Center, Santa Clara Transit Center, Santa Clara University, SAP Center, Downtown San Jose, San Jose State University, Alum Rock station, Eastridge Mall	Part of the Frequent Network.; For service to other stops not served by this line, as well as for stops along King Rd, Tully Rd, and Capitol Expwy, see lines 22 and 23 above.
Rapid 523	East-West	Sunnyvale; Lockheed Martin Transit Center	San Jose; San Jose State University	Daily	Line 523	Lockheed Martin, Downtown Sunnyvale, De Anza College, Westfield Valley Fair, Santana Row, Downtown San Jose, San Jose State University	For local service along San Carlos St and Stevens Creek Blvd, see line 23.; For local service along Sunnyvale-Saratoga Rd, see line 55.
Rapid 568	North-South	San Jose; Diridon station	Gilroy; Gilroy station	Weekdays	Line 568	San Jose State University, Downtown San Jose, Downtown Morgan Hill, San Martin, Downtown Gilroy	Serves all Caltrain stops between Gilroy and San Jose Diridon (except Morgan Hill and Tamien), and uses Monterey Rd/S First St for almost all of its route.; For the local route including stops along Main Av, Hale Av/Santa Teresa Bl, and Cottle Rd, as well as both the Santa Teresa and Cottle light rail stations, see line 68.

== Special bus services ==
=== Express routes ===
VTA's Express Bus routes operate along many of Santa Clara County's freeways, including Highway 85, Highway 237, Interstate 280 and U.S. Route 101. These routes use suburban-style Gillig low-floor buses with unique color schemes and onboard Wi-Fi.

These services mainly operate during weekday peak periods only, operating in the typical commute direction.

Due to the large subsidy per rider to operate express bus routes, VTA eliminated most express bus routes in the December 28, 2019 network redesign, except for those serving the Stanford Research Park, which funded the cost of operating the service. Fares are higher than standard bus fares.

Line Number	Direction	Terminals		Days of Operation	Schedule Information	Roads Used	Additional destinations
Express 101	North-South	San Jose; Camden Av & SR 85 Park and Ride	Palo Alto; Stanford Research Park (Hansen Wy & Page Mill Rd)	Weekdays	Line 101	Camden Av, Winchester Bl, Hamilton Av, Lawrence Expwy, Stevens Creek Bl, Vallco Pkwy, I-280	Winchester Transit Center, Westgate Center
Express 102	North-South	San Jose; Santa Teresa station	Palo Alto; Stanford Research Park (Hansen Wy & Page Mill Rd)	Weekdays	Line 102	Santa Teresa Bl, Snell Ave, SR-85, I-280	Snell station, Ohlone/Chynoweth station
Express 103	East-West	San Jose; Eastridge Transit Center	Palo Alto; Stanford Research Park (Hansen Wy & Page Mill Rd)	Weekdays	Line 103	Capitol Expwy, I-680, Southwest Expwy, Fruitdale Av, Meridian Av, I-280	Capitol Expwy & Story Rd, Fruitdale station
Express 104	East-West	Milpitas; Milpitas station	Palo Alto; Stanford Research Park (Deer Creek Rd & Arastradero Rd)	Weekdays	Line 104	Great Mall Pkwy, Main St, Calaveras Blvd, SR-237, US-101, Oregon Expwy, Page Mill Rd	Downtown Milpitas, Palo Alto V.A. Hospital

=== School tripper routes ===
VTA operates a collection of routes timed specifically to serve students at local high schools. These services only operate around bell times when schools are in session.

Line Number	Hours of Operation	School Served	Other Destinations	Schedule Information	Notes
School 246	AM & PM	Milpitas; Milpitas High School	Central Milpitas	School Trippers	
School 247	AM & PM	Milpitas; Milpitas High School	Central Milpitas	School Trippers	
School 255	AM & PM	Sunnyvale; Fremont High School	North Sunnyvale	School Trippers	Operates via Fair Oaks Ave; Bypasses Downtown Sunnyvale
School 256	AM & PM	San Jose; Willow Glen High School	Central San Jose, Tamien station	School Trippers	
School 287	PM	Morgan Hill; Live Oak High School	Morgan Hill, San Martin	School Trippers	
School 288	AM & PM	Palo Alto; Gunn High School	Central Palo Alto	School Trippers	Afternoon trips start at Palo Alto V.A. Hospital; 288 operates via Charleston Rd, Middlefield Rd, and Loma Verde Ave; 288L operates via Meadow Dr and Louis Rd
School 288L	AM & PM	Palo Alto; Gunn High School	Central Palo Alto	School Trippers	Afternoon trips start at Palo Alto V.A. Hospital; 288 operates via Charleston Rd, Middlefield Rd, and Loma Verde Ave; 288L operates via Meadow Dr and Louis Rd

=== ACE (Altamont Corridor Express) shuttles ===
The VTA operates a network of free shuttle routes serving employment centers in Sunnyvale, Mountain View, Milpitas, Santa Clara, and San Jose in coordination with the Altamont Corridor Express (ACE) train service and private-sector partners. Funding is provided by participating employers and business associations in Santa Clara County, along with grants from the Bay Area Air Quality Management District.

All shuttles listed below originate at Santa Clara–Great America station and are scheduled to connect with ACE train arrivals in the morning and departures in the afternoon. The shuttles operate on weekdays, excluding holidays, and may be used free of charge by passengers.

Line	Direction	Origin/Destination	Companies served	Schedule Information	Notes
Gray South Sunnyvale	North-South	Sunnyvale; Kifer Rd & Uranium Dr	Nortel; Brocade; Yahoo!; EMC Corporation; Applied Materials; Fujitsu; AMD; Trimble; Maxim; Texas Industries; Qualcomm	Gray	Known internally as Line 822; First PM peak trip bypasses Evelyn & Wolfe stop
Green North Santa Clara	East-West	Santa Clara; America Center Dr	America Center; Oracle; Marvell; Abbott; FileMaker; Coherent	Green	Known internally as Line 823
Orange Mountain View/Palo Alto	East-West	Palo Alto; E Meadow Dr & Meadow Cir	Microsoft; Google; Intuit; Space Systems/Loral	Orange	Known internally as Line 824; Operates via SR 237, US 101, Shoreline Bl, and Charleston Rd
Purple West Milpitas	East-West	Milpitas; McCarthy Ranch	Cisco; Avaya	Purple	Known internally as Line 825; Operates via Tasman Dr, Alder Dr, McCarthy Blvd, and Ranch Dr
Red North Sunnyvale	East-West	Sunnyvale; Lockheed Martin Transit Center	Harmonic; Aruba Networks; NetApp; Juniper Networks; Yahoo!; Lockheed Martin	Red	Known internally as Line 826; A portion of this line operates through restricted areas inside Moffett Federal Airfield. A Lockheed Martin Commuter Badge is required to access the restricted areas
Yellow South Santa Clara	North-South	Santa Clara; Scott Blvd at Intel	Nortel; Brocade; AMD; Yahoo!; Data Domain; Intel; General Dynamics; Synaptics; NEC; Nvidia	Yellow	Known internally as Line 827; Operates in a one-way loop to and from Scott Blvd & San Tomas Expwy via Walsh Av, Kifer Rd, and Great America Pkwy
Brown North San Jose/Light Rail	North-South	San Jose; N First St & Montague Expwy	Cisco; KLA Tencor; Altera; Cadence; VTA Headquarters	Brown	Known internally as Line 828; Serves light rail stations along Tasman Dr and N First St; Operates in a one-way loop to and from N First St & River Oaks Pkwy via Seely Av and Montague Expwy
Violet South Milpitas	North-South	San Jose; Lundy Ave & Commerce Dr	Cisco; KLA Tencor; Sandisk; Avaya; Optoma; LSI Linear Tech; Propel Software; Abbott; Olympus; Oncore Manufacturing; DeVry University	Violet	Known internally as Line 831

=== Light Rail Substitution ===
VTA operates a series of bus routes daily during late nights in coordination with the last trips of light rail service. Buses serve stops at or near all light rail stations on the route unless stated otherwise. All valid light rail tickets and passes are accepted on these routes.

Line Number	Direction	Terminals		Schedule Information	Notes
200	West	San Jose; Baypointe station	Mountain View; Mountain View station	Line 200	Late night substitution for the last three westbound Orange Line trips; Operates non stop service between Fair Oaks station and Mountain View station
201	South	San Jose; Santa Clara light rail station	San Jose; Santa Teresa station	Line 201	Late night substitution for the last southbound Blue Line trip
202	South	San Jose; Santa Clara light rail station	Campbell; Winchester Transit Center	Line 202	Late night substitution for the last southbound Green Line trip
203	North	San Jose; Civic Center station	San Jose; Alum Rock Transit Center	Line 203	Late night substitution for the last two northbound Blue Line trips; Also serves Orange Line stations between Baypointe and Alum Rock

== Regional services ==
The VTA collaborates with other regional agencies that operate into and out of Santa Clara County with inter-agency transfers and commuter benefits. However, these lines do not use VTA's own buses nor levy VTA's bus fares; instead, these are operated by a consortium of operators, in which the agency is a participant, and the consortium sets the fares for such services.

Line Name	Direction	Terminals		Days of Operation	Communities Served	Schedule Information	Notes
Line Name	Direction	Santa Clara County Terminal	Regional Terminal	Days of Operation	Communities Served	Schedule Information	Notes
Highway 17 Express	North-South	San Jose; San Jose State University (select weekday trips)	Santa Cruz; River Front Transit Center	Daily	San Jose, Scotts Valley, Santa Cruz	Highway 17 Express	Known internally as Line 970.; Operated by Santa Cruz Metro.; Jointly funded by VTA, Caltrans, Capitol Corridor Joint Powers Authority, and Santa Cruz Metro.; Select trips serve Cavallaro Transit Center in Scotts Valley.; Select Scotts Valley trips operate via Scotts Valley Dr on weekdays.; Some trips timed to connect with Amtrak trains at Diridon station.; Weekday service to San Jose State University begins and ends at San Fernando & 7th St.
Highway 17 Express	North-South	San Jose; Diridon station	Santa Cruz; River Front Transit Center	Daily	San Jose, Scotts Valley, Santa Cruz	Highway 17 Express	Known internally as Line 970.; Operated by Santa Cruz Metro.; Jointly funded by VTA, Caltrans, Capitol Corridor Joint Powers Authority, and Santa Cruz Metro.; Select trips serve Cavallaro Transit Center in Scotts Valley.; Select Scotts Valley trips operate via Scotts Valley Dr on weekdays.; Some trips timed to connect with Amtrak trains at Diridon station.; Weekday service to San Jose State University begins and ends at San Fernando & 7th St.
Dumbarton Express; Line DB	East-West	Palo Alto; Stanford University	Union City; Union City station	Weekdays	Palo Alto, Menlo Park, Newark, Union City	Line DB	Known internally as Line 971.; Jointly funded by VTA, AC Transit, BART, SamTrans, and Union City Transit. Administered by AC Transit and operated under contract by MV Transportation.; Also serves Palo Alto station, Menlo Park V.A. Hospital, and Ardenwood Park-and-Ride in Newark via Palm Av, Lytton Av, Middlefield Rd, Willow Rd, Dumbarton Bridge, and Decoto Rd.
Dumbarton Express; Line DB1	East-West	Palo Alto; Stanford Research Park (Deer Creek Rd)	Union City; Union City station	Weekdays	Palo Alto, Newark, Union City	Line DB1	Known internally as Line 974.; Jointly funded by VTA, AC Transit, BART, SamTrans, and Union City Transit. Administered by AC Transit and operated under contract by MV Transportation.; Also serves Palo Alto V.A. Hospital and Ardenwood Park-and-Ride in Newark via Oregon Expwy, Page Mill Rd, Deer Creek Rd, Hillview Av, Miranda Av, and Hanover St.
Monterey-Salinas Transit; Line 59	North-South	Gilroy; Gilroy station	Salinas; Salinas Intermodal Transportation Center	Weekdays	Salinas, Prunedale, Gilroy	MST Line 59	Jointly funded by VTA and Monterey-Salinas Transit. Operated by Monterey-Salinas Transit.; Offers timed connections to Caltrain's South County Connector, VTA's Rapid 568, and the County Express to Hollister.; Also serves Prunedale Park-and-Ride via US-101 and the Salinas Transit Center.
