= Bay Area Rapid Transit expansion =

Overview of the expansion of Bay Area Rapid Transit

Throughout the history of Bay Area Rapid Transit, there have been plans to extend service to other areas.

== History ==
The initial 1962 BART maps approved by voters included several lines beyond the core system marked as Possible Future Extensions. Some have since come to fruition as previous extensions of the system:

- The extension from Concord to Antioch was carried out in phases with service to North Concord / Martinez in 1995, Pittsburg / Bay Point in 1996, and the eBART spur which started service in 2018.
- A line to Livermore was completed as far as Dublin/Pleasanton by 1997, with final completion of the envisioned corridor to be carried out by Valley Link.
- Service south of Fremont is expected to reach San Jose and Santa Clara (partially via the Caltrain right of way) by 2030. It was extended to Warm Springs in 2017 and Berryessa in 2020.
- Extension from Daly City to the south was completed in phases as the Colma Station opened in 1996 and the line to Millbrae was completed in 2003 with a spur to San Francisco International Airport. The full Southern Pacific (now Caltrain) right of way has been electrified for frequent service with mainline trains, separate from BART.
- The Marin Line via Geary was initially cancelled due to the county exiting the planning district over funding and engineering issues. There were two possible routes: (1) via Geary to Park Presidio, then across the Golden Gate Bridge via rails that would have been built into the truss supports under the roadway, then after tunneling through the Waldo Grade to Marin City, would have emerged from underground and followed the old train tracks north through the county; (2) alternatively, to tunnel from Fort Mason/Aquatic Park to downtown Sausalito and follow the right-of-way from the old train tracks.

An additional corridor not part of the 1962 plan completed since the agency's inception is the automated guideway transit spur line that connects BART to Oakland International Airport which opened in 2014.

As of August 2021, the BART map has one route marked for Future Service: the second phase of the Silicon Valley BART extension into San Jose, shown as a thick, gray dashed line. The planned Irvington station is also shown.

== Extension under construction ==
=== San Jose subway extension (Phase 2) ===
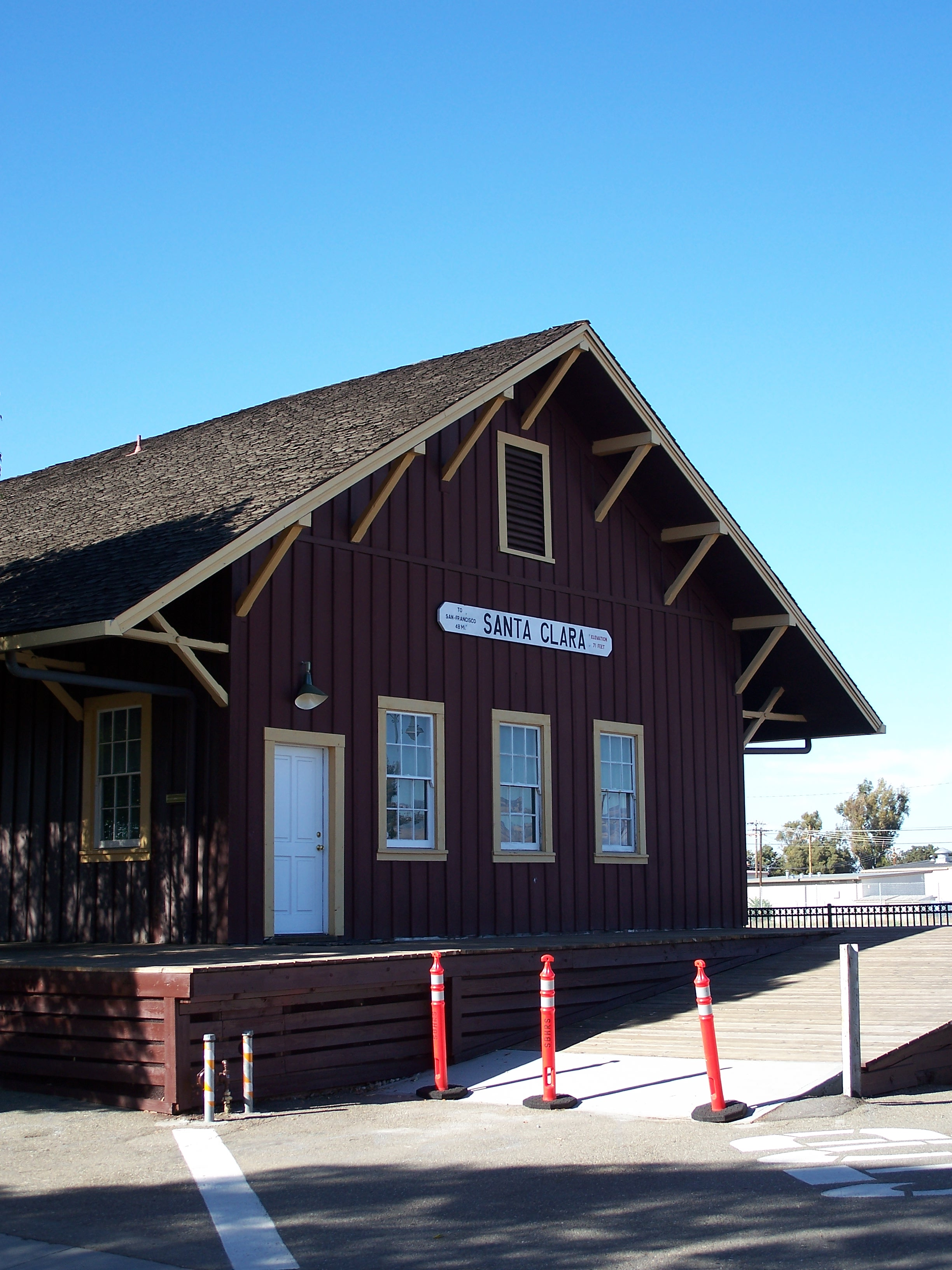
BART will eventually terminate at Santa Clara Transit Center.

The original plan for the Silicon Valley extension was to continue into downtown San Jose and Santa Clara via subway. However, in February 2009, projections of lower-than-expected sales-tax receipts from the funding measures forced the Santa Clara Valley Transportation Authority to scale back the extension, ending it at the Berryessa/North San José station and delaying tunneling under downtown San Jose to a future phase of construction (making it essentially a "Phase 2" of the project). The originally-planned complete extension from Fremont to Santa Clara had been projected to cost $6.1 billion, but the VTA estimates the extension to Berryessa (Phase 1 only) would cost just $2.3 billion.

The plans for the downtown subway start with a portal before crossing under US 101, with subway stations at 28th Street/Little Portugal, Downtown San Jose station (The Downtown San Jose station was combined in 2005 from earlier plans for separate subway stations at Civic Plaza/San Jose State University and Market Street.), and Diridon/Arena. The line would exit to the surface after crossing under I-880 and terminate at a Santa Clara BART station co-located at the existing Santa Clara Depot. Separate construction plans by San Jose International Airport would bring a people-mover train to either the Santa Clara Depot or to Diridon Station.

For the subway segment in San Jose, VTA plans to use a tunnel boring machine for most of the length in order to reduce disruptions to downtown during construction. Only the station locations would have cut and cover construction. This is different from how BART subways and stations were built in San Francisco and Oakland, which used the cut and cover method. The construction of the cut and cover stations in downtown San Jose would still cause major albeit temporary disruption, including closing several blocks of Santa Clara Street and severing the VTA light rail line at that street. The extension to downtown San Jose could open 2026, contingent on approval of funding. As of April 2018, the plan was to have a single-bore tunnel under Santa Clara Street with cut and cover construction at the station locations only. Utility relocation started and soil samples were taken in February 2019, with construction to begin in 2022.

==== Funding and electoral history (2000–2008) ====
Because Santa Clara County is not among the member counties of the BART District (having opted out at the district's inception, like neighboring San Mateo County), VTA is responsible for building the extension within Santa Clara County. VTA allocated initial funds for constructing BART using the proceeds from a sales tax referendum which was passed by Santa Clara County voters in 2000. In December 2002, VTA purchased a freight railroad corridor from Union Pacific Railroad which will serve as much of the necessary right-of-way for both the Warm Springs and San Jose extensions for $80 million.

In 2004, the Federal Transit Administration decided to wait to fund the project, citing worries that BART did not have enough money to operate the extension. In addition, the San Jose extension project received a "not recommended" rating from the Federal Transit Administration, placing the federal portion of the funding in jeopardy because of concerns about operation and maintenance funding.

Santa Clara County voters passed Measure B in 2008, a 1/8-cent sales tax raise. Projections by an independent consultant recommended by the Federal Transit Administration predicted that the 1/8-cent sales tax would more than cover operation and maintenance of the proposed extension.

San Jose voters passed Measure B in 2016, which allowed for final funding of the subway.

== Proposed extensions ==
=== Livermore extension: Tri-Valley Corridor (I-580 & I-680) ===
Service in the Tri-Valley area had previously been considered with diesel multiple unit service originating at Walnut Creek and running as far east as Tracy. A proposed extension will further service from Dublin/Pleasanton station east to Livermore, either via traditional BART infrastructure, diesel multiple unit technology similar to eBART, or enhanced bus service. It could possibly continue over the Altamont Pass into Tracy and the Central Valley along I-580 and I-205.

As part of BART's 50th anniversary and envisioning another fifty years of service, planners foresaw a new East Bay alignment originating at Warm Springs station and running via Interstate 680 to the Martinez Amtrak station. It would connect to the existing stations at Dublin / Pleasanton and go north through Dublin, San Ramon, Danville, and Alamo to the existing Walnut Creek station via the I-680 corridor.

An existing diesel commuter rail line, the Altamont Corridor Express (ACE), currently operates through Livermore. The two systems are linked, though not directly, by a free shuttle bus which transfers passengers between the ACE Pleasanton station and the BART Dublin/Pleasanton station.

A preferred alignment was selected July 1, 2010 and originally had the support of the Livermore City Council. This plan would have involved the construction of a station in downtown Livermore, and a second station on Vasco Road near Lawrence Livermore National Laboratory and Sandia National Laboratories. Both proposed stations would have provided nearby connections to Altamont Corridor Express service. However, in July 2011, the Livermore City Council reversed its position in response to a petition requesting that the alignment stay within or nearby the Interstate 580 right-of-way, and now favors stations be built at the Interstate 580 interchanges with Isabel Avenue and Greenville Road. BART's Environmental Impact Report Notice of Preparation, issued in September 2012, proposed a single station at I-580 and Isabel Avenue, with possible express bus services connecting to the Vasco Road ACE station and a park-and-ride lot at I-580 and Greenville Road. Land use plans and studies were being prepared by the city of Livermore in September 2015, with completion envisioned in 2026. Additional funding for consulting and planning were allocated in late 2016, against the wishes of then BART District President Tom Radulovich. On July 31, 2017, BART released the Draft Environmental Impact Report of the project. The direct BART to ACE connection was studied in preparation for ACEforward projects.

In 2017, citing lack of interest in the project from BART, the Livermore City Council proposed a newly established local entity to undertake planning and construction of the extension, which was also recommended by the California State Assembly Transportation Committee. The Tri-Valley–San Joaquin Valley Regional Rail Authority was established that year "for purposes of planning, developing, and delivering cost-effective and responsive transit connectivity between the Bay Area Rapid Transit District's rapid transit system and the Altamont Corridor Express commuter rail service in the Tri-Valley, that meets the goals and objectives of the community." On May 24, 2018, the BART board voted against a full rapid transit BART build or a bus rapid transit system to extend service east from Dublin/Pleasanton station, thus granting the new authority oversight and funding for constructing a new service called the Valley Link. Money previously allocated to BART to construct a Livermore extension were forfeited to the authority by July 1, 2018.

=== BART Metro Vision ===
Key components of the overall vision for BART's future, dubbed BART Metro Vision, include more capacity in stations, increased train frequency to allow for "show up and go" service at stations within the system's operational core, and increased performance reliability. The most recent report from BART Metro Vision also identifies improvements to its rolling stock, the Hayward Maintenance Complex, and the modernization of its train control system as key improvements for securing the system's long-term viability.

=== Second Transbay crossing ===
Part of BART's 50th anniversary service planning included a new separate Transbay Tube beneath San Francisco Bay running parallel to and south of the existing tube. This would emerge at the Salesforce Transit Center to provide connecting service to Caltrain and the planned California High-Speed Rail (CAHSR) system. The additional four-bore Transbay Tube would provide two additional tracks for BART trains, and two tracks for conventional/high-speed rail (the BART system and conventional U.S. rail use different and incompatible rail gauges, and operate under different sets of safety regulations).

Transit advocacy groups in the Bay Area, such as SPUR, have long promoted larger-scale expansion of the BART system through various capital projects - one identified as a long-term goal in the Metro Vision is the construction of a second, four-bore rail tunnel under San Francisco Bay, increasing connectivity and capacity of the system. The second crossing would likely route to the Salesforce Transit Center for connections with conventional mainline rail services. In 2018, BART announced that a feasibility study for installing a second transbay crossing would commence the following year. By 2019, the Capitol Corridor Joint Powers Authority had joined with BART to study a multi-modal crossing, which could also allow Capitol Corridor and San Joaquin routes to serve San Francisco directly.

In 2021, the Link21 program was announced, using funding from Regional Measure 3. The program initially proposed a 4-track transbay crossing for both BART and commuter rail; however, this was pared back to 2 tracks. In November 2024, Link21 staff recommended standard gauge commuter rail over BART's broad gauge for the tunnel. This would serve the electrified Caltrain service, with the potential to service both Capitol Corridor and California High-Speed Rail services.

=== eBART extension ===
Expansions of the DMU-serviced eBART system come at a lower cost-per-mile than conventional wide-gauge BART infrastructure. Service could extend to Oakley, Byron, or Brentwood.

=== Geary Subway ===
Part of the plan for the original system before Marin County's departure from the BART District was a line running under Geary Street and turning north to the Golden Gate Bridge. When Marin County pulled out of the transit district, some plans called for a subway only extending down Geary, but these too were soon scrapped. In 1995, the San Francisco Municipal Railway hired Merrill & Associates to study the possibility of building a new BART subway beneath Geary in conjunction with adding light rail on the surface. The estimated cost of construction as far as Park Presidio Boulevard was $1.4 billion in 1995 ($2.96 billion adjusted for inflation). Projections from this study put BART ridership at 18,000 daily boardings, and the alignment would allow for a further extension to Marin. These plans were dropped, according to former Senator Quentin L. Kopp, due to merchant and resident opposition, citing potential blight similar to that caused by Market Street Subway construction two decades earlier.

Ongoing studies will determine whether the corridor may one day be served by future BART service. It may be constructed as an extension of the second Transbay Tube.

=== wBART extension ===
The only branch of the original BART system that has not been extended since service commenced is the line ending at Richmond station. Possible alignments for an extension further north were examined in 1983, 1992, and 2017. Both newly constructed BART wide-gauge electrified rail and the use of existing freight rail rights of way and tracks with more readily available standard gauge trains were considered. Potential station locations include Hilltop Mall, Pinole, and Hercules Transit Center. The cost of an extension to Hercules Transit Center utilizing mainline BART technology was estimated at $3.6 billion in 2017 with a ridership of 21,980 by 2040. The extension to Hercules is controversial in that the main proponent wants to build it directly from the El Cerrito del Norte BART station while the city of Richmond is very opposed to this. Furthermore, the majority of the Hercules city council opposes the extension as they believe it will detract from their plan to develop Hercules station.

=== Menlo Park extension ===
In 1999, a short-lived proposal to extend BART from the Millbrae station (then under construction) to Menlo Park was advanced by the San Mateo County Economic Development Association (SAMCEDA). The proposed routing would have paralleled the Caltrain tracks to Broadway station in Burlingame, and then would run along the median of Bayshore Freeway to Menlo Park, with stations in San Mateo, Belmont/San Carlos, Redwood City, and Menlo Park. Cost estimates ranged up to US$2,500,000,000 (equivalent to $4,830,000,000 in 2025), drawing funding from a 1/2-cent sales tax increase in San Mateo County. BART leadership warned the timing was not appropriate for a push further south into San Mateo County, and SAMCEDA withdrew the proposal by the summer of 1999.

== Infill stations ==
Infill stations are stations constructed on existing line segments between two existing stations. The Embarcadero (1976) and West Dublin/Pleasanton (2011) stations are the only infill stations currently in the BART system. The Doolittle Maintenance and Storage Facility, initially slated to be opened as a full station along the Oakland Airport Connector, may be repurposed for passenger service at a later date.

Construction costs for a planned 30th Street Mission station in San Francisco, between the existing 24th Street Mission and Glen Park stations, were estimated at $500 million in 2003. A proposal for a Jack London Square station in Oakland was rejected in 2004 as being incompatible with existing track geometry; a one-station stub line at the foot of Broadway and the use of other transit modes also were studied. BART planners studied additional stations at four other sites within the system in 2007: Albany, Calaveras, Irvington, and 30th Street Mission. Other potential stations noted in 2014 included a station at 30th Street/Mission in San Francisco, an infill station between Richmond and El Cerrito del Norte, and four Oakland stations at Children's Hospital Oakland, San Antonio/Brooklyn Basin, Melrose and Elmhurst.

The City of Fremont re-evaluated the Irvington station's environmental impact report in 2017, and a station area plan was adopted by the Fremont City Council and approved by the BART Board of Directors in 2019. As of August 2023, estimates from the city anticipated construction to begin in 2026, with the Irvington station opening for service in 2031.
