= Bay Area Rapid Transit District =

Rapid transit district body

A map of California, with the Bay Area Rapid Transit District highlighted in blue, non-member counties served by BART in yellow, and the former (unserved) member county, Marin, in red.

The San Francisco Bay Area Rapid Transit District (abbreviated BART) is a special-purpose district body that governs the Bay Area Rapid Transit system in the California counties of Alameda, Contra Costa and San Francisco. The system itself also serves northern San Mateo County and Santa Clara County; however, these counties have bought into the system and have neither a voting stake nor any representatives in the district proper. The District currently operates 50 stations, 817 rail cars, 131 miles of track (33.5 miles on elevated railway, 65.1 miles of track at-grade and 32.8 miles of subway track.)

== History ==
The San Francisco Bay Area Rapid Transit District (occasionally abbreviated in early years to BARTD) was created in 1957 to provide a transit alternative between suburbs in the East Bay and job centers in San Francisco's Financial District as well as (to a lesser extent) those in Downtown Oakland and Downtown Berkeley.

Of the six Bay Area counties initially envisioned as participants—San Francisco, Marin, Contra Costa, Alameda, San Mateo, and Santa Clara—only Santa Clara County refused to join when the district was first set up. From 1957 to 1962, the district originally included the other five counties, including both San Mateo and Marin. San Mateo opted out in 1962, preferring to utilize funds to build its freeway and expressway system. Marin left a month after San Mateo, fearing that it would be unable to absorb its share of operating costs with San Mateo's withdrawal. Marin was also concerned by ongoing debate about the feasibility of running trains across a lower deck of the Golden Gate Bridge.

== Expansion ==
The Silicon Valley BART Extension, managed by the VTA, is a 6-mile extension of BART service to San Jose and Santa Clara in Santa Clara County. Phase I was completed with the opening of the Berryessa/North San José station in 2020, which is the first BART station in San Jose. Phase II includes the build-out to Little Portugal with the 28th Street/Little Portugal station, Downtown San Jose with the Downtown San José station, Diridon station, and into the City of Santa Clara with the Santa Clara station. Construction and testing is expected to be completed 2028–2030.

== Governance ==
The BART district is split into nine electorals districts, each of which elects one board member. The elections are staggered so that directors serve four year terms, with half the board up for election every two years. Odd-numbered districts (1, 3, 5, 7, and 9) vote in presidential election years, while even-numbered districts (2, 4, 6, and 8) vote in midterm election years.

One board member acts as president. The board members hire and fire five officers: the general manager, controller-treasurer, independent police auditor, general counsel, and district secretary.

=== Current board of directors ===
As of November 2024, the current board members are:

District No.	Board Member	County(s)	Stations
1	Matt Rinn	Contra Costa	Concord, Lafayette, Orinda Pleasant Hill/Contra Costa Centre, Walnut Creek
2	Mark Foley (President)	Contra Costa	Antioch, Concord, North Concord/Martinez, Pittsburg/Bay Point, Pittsburg Center
3	Barnali Ghosh	Alameda / Contra Costa	Ashby, Downtown Berkeley, El Cerrito del Norte, El Cerrito Plaza, North Berkeley, Richmond
4	Robert Raburn	Alameda	Bay Fair, Coliseum, Fruitvale, Hayward, Oakland International Airport, San Leandro, South Hayward
5	Melissa Hernandez (Vice President)	Alameda / Contra Costa	Castro Valley, Dublin/Pleasanton, Hayward, West Dublin/Pleasanton
6	Liz Ames	Alameda	Fremont, South Hayward, Union City, Warm Springs/South Fremont
7	Victor Flores	Alameda / San Francisco	12th St/Oakland City Center, 19th St/Oakland, Ashby, Lake Merritt, MacArthur, Rockridge, West Oakland
8	Janice Li	San Francisco	Balboa Park, Embarcadero, Glen Park, Montgomery, Powell Street
9	Edward Wright	San Francisco	16th Street Mission, 24th Street Mission, Embarcadero, Civic Center/UN Plaza, Glen Park, Montgomery, Powell Street
