= San Fernando station =

San Fernando station may refer to:

- San Fernando station (Pampanga), a defunct railway station in San Fernando City, Pampanga, Philippines
- San Fernando U station, a defunct PNR station in San Fernando City, La Union, Philippines (see references on talk page)
- San Fernando station (VTA), a light rail station in San Jose, California, United States
- Estación San Fernando, a railway station in Colchagua, Chile
- Sylmar/San Fernando station, a railway station in Los Angeles, California, United States
