= Irvington station =

Irvington station may refer to:

- Irvington station (BART), in Fremont, California
- Irvington station (Metro-North), in Irvington, New York
