= Highway 17 Express =

Bus route in California

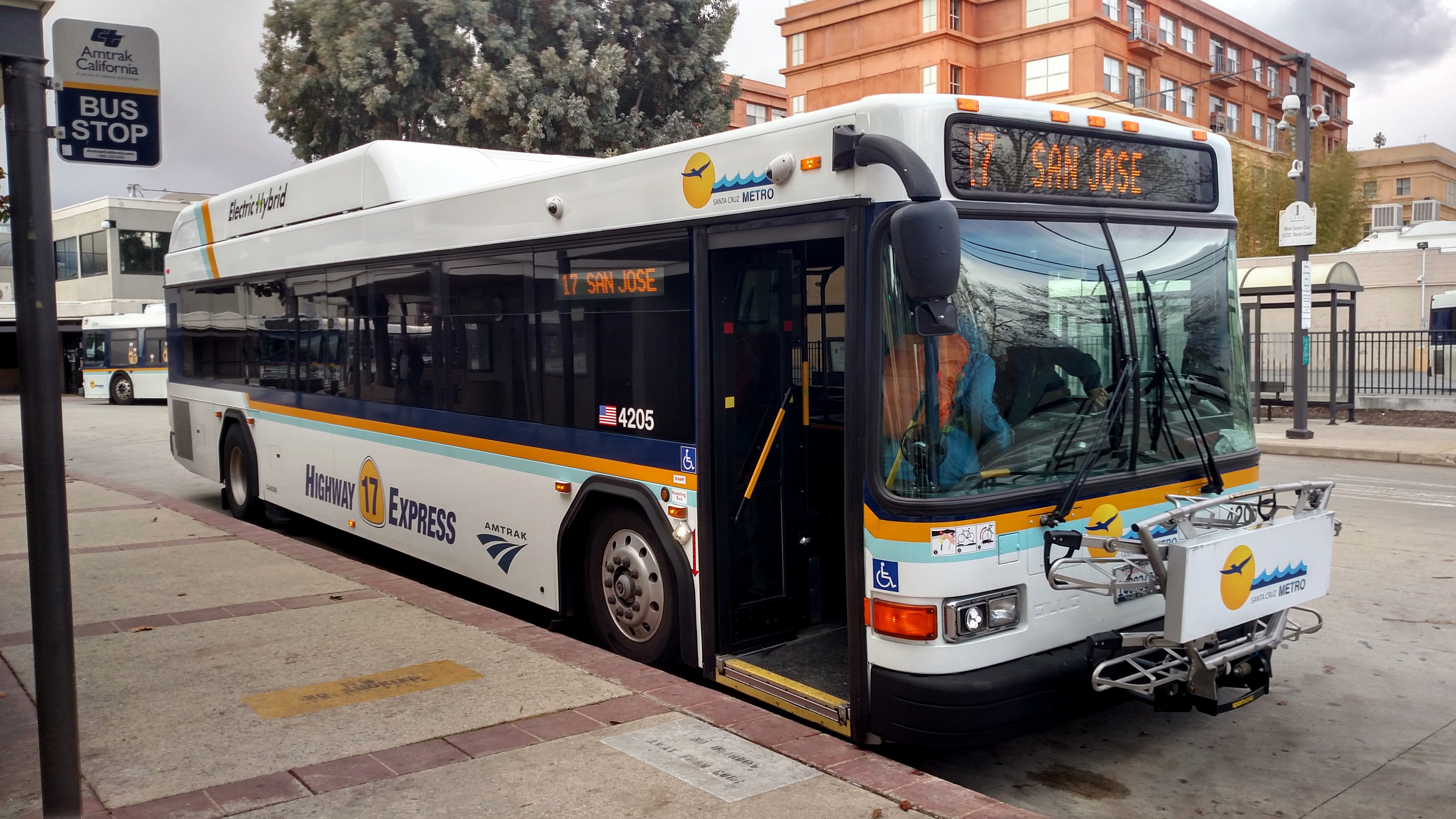
- Highway 17 Express bus in downtown Santa Cruz

Overview
- System: Amtrak Thruway
- Operator: Santa Cruz Metro
- Began service: 1989

Route
- Locale: Santa Cruz and Santa Clara Counties, California
- Start: Santa Cruz
- Via: Scotts Valley
- End: San Jose
Route map
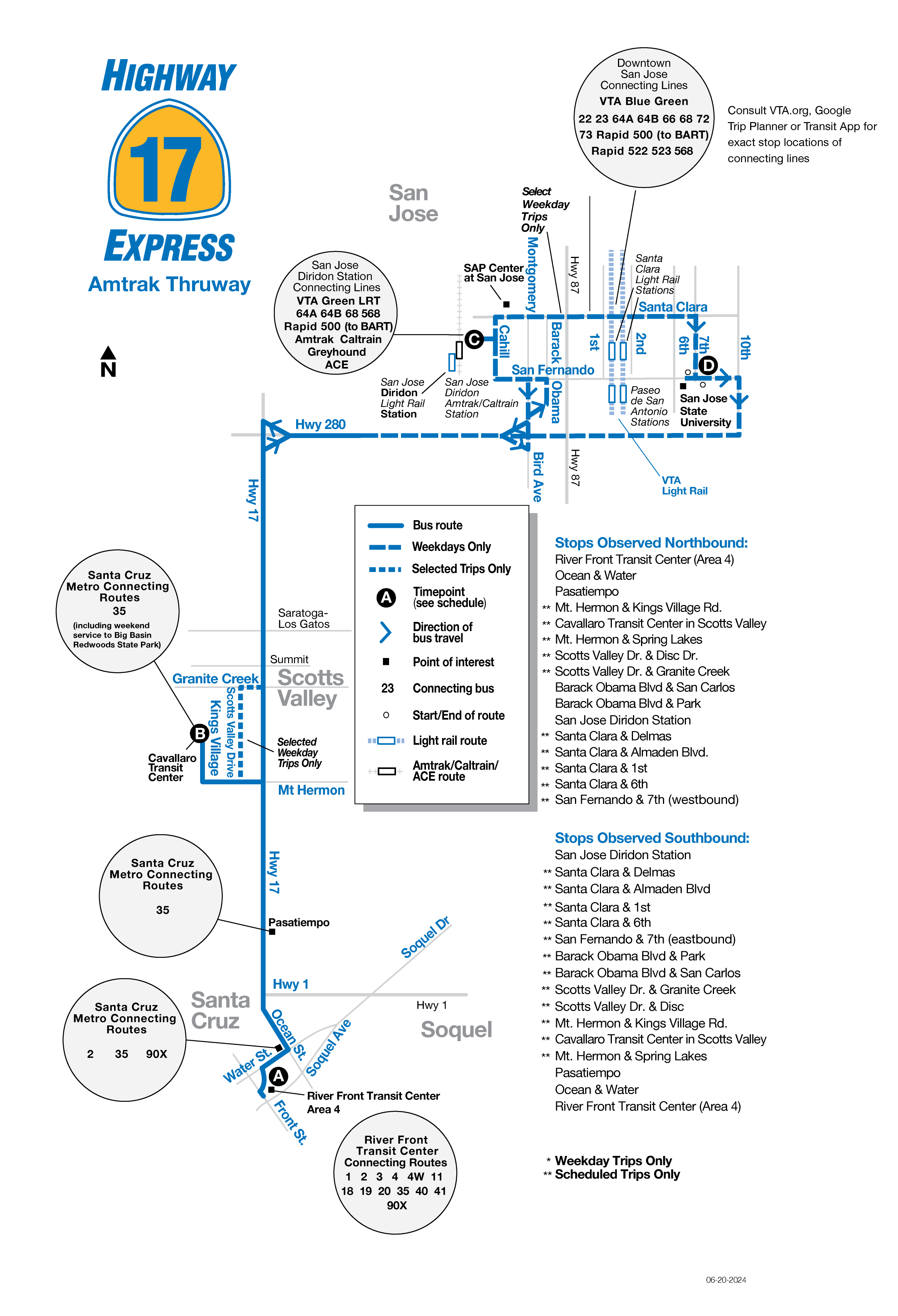

The Highway 17 Express is a regional bus service in the San Francisco Bay Area, operated by Santa Cruz Metro as part of the Amtrak Thruway network. The route connects Santa Cruz and San Jose via California State Route 17, with intermediate stops in Pasatiempo and Scotts Valley.

The Highway 17 Express service began in 1989 as a commuter bus service, and was merged with an Amtrak Thruway intercity bus service in 2004. As a result, the route's schedules and ticketing are integrated with both local and long-distance transport networks. The service is jointly funded by Santa Cruz Metro, Caltrans, and the Santa Clara Valley Transportation Authority.

== Service ==
Highway 17 Express buses operate between San Jose and Santa Cruz 365 days per year, with hourly departures on weekends and midday weekdays, and more frequent service during weekday rush hours. Schedules are coordinated with Capitol Corridor train schedules, and are adjusted seasonally based on travel demand to San Jose State University and UC Santa Cruz.

All trips serve the River Front Transit Center in downtown Santa Cruz and San Jose Diridon station, with an intermediate stop in Pasatiempo. Approximately half of all trips serve the Caballaro Transit Center in Scotts Valley. During weekday peak hours, the service's northern terminal is extended to San Jose State University.

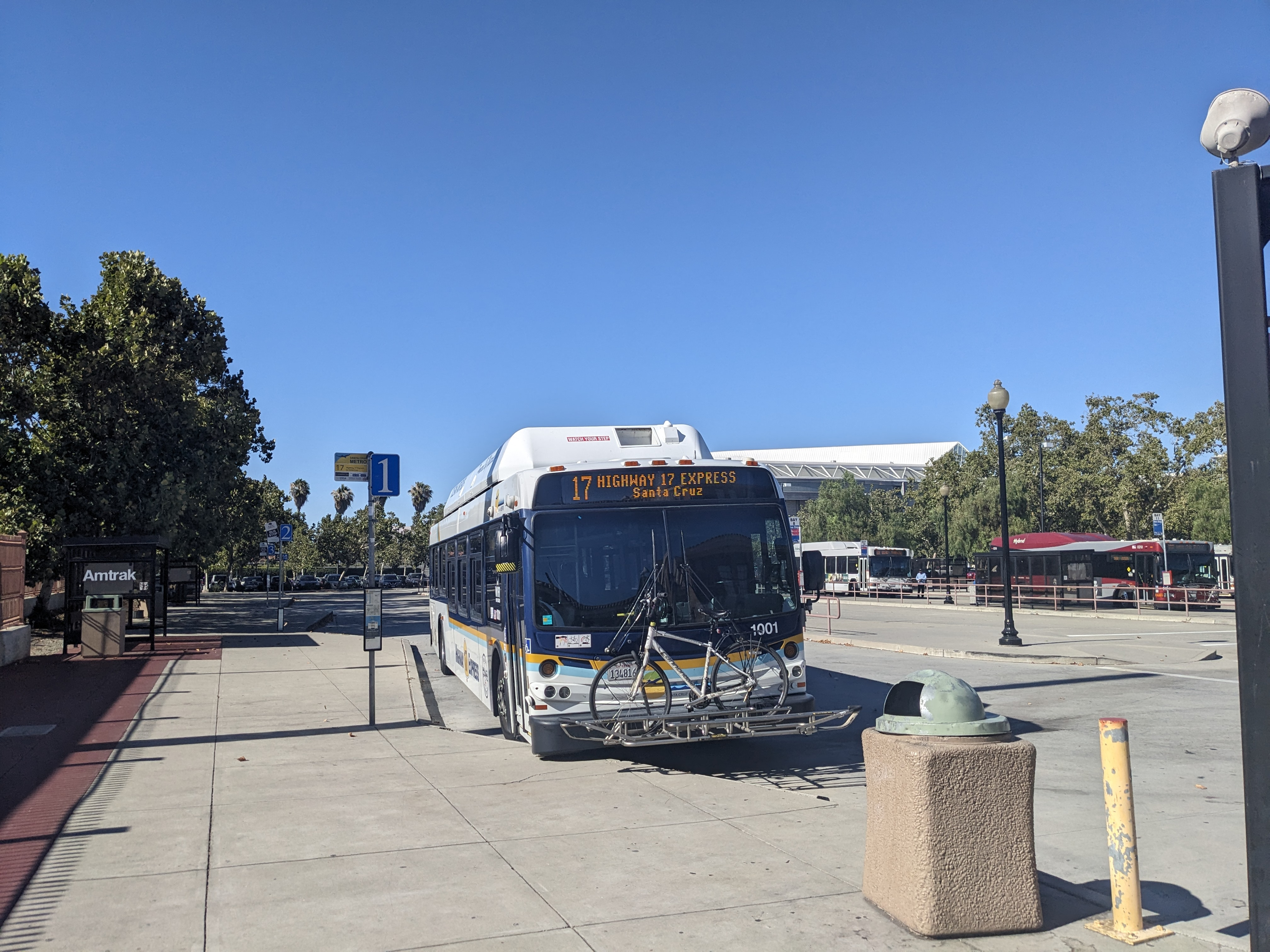
Highway 17 Express bus at Diridon Station

Highway 17 Express service is fully accessible to individuals with disabilities. Additionally, buses are equipped with bicycle racks, which are available free of charge.

=== Fares ===
The regular fare for the Highway 17 Express is $7.00. Daily and monthly unlimited passes and multiple-ride tickets are also available, and discounted fares are available for seniors and individuals with disabilities. Unlimited passes for the Highway 17 Express are also valid for local bus and light rail services in San Jose and Santa Cruz.

Amtrak and Greyhound sell tickets for the Highway 17 Express, for trips that connect to their national networks. Santa Cruz Metro services, including the Highway 17 Express, do not accept the Clipper card. Tickets are also sold through the METRO Splash Pass mobile app.

== History ==
=== Predecessors ===
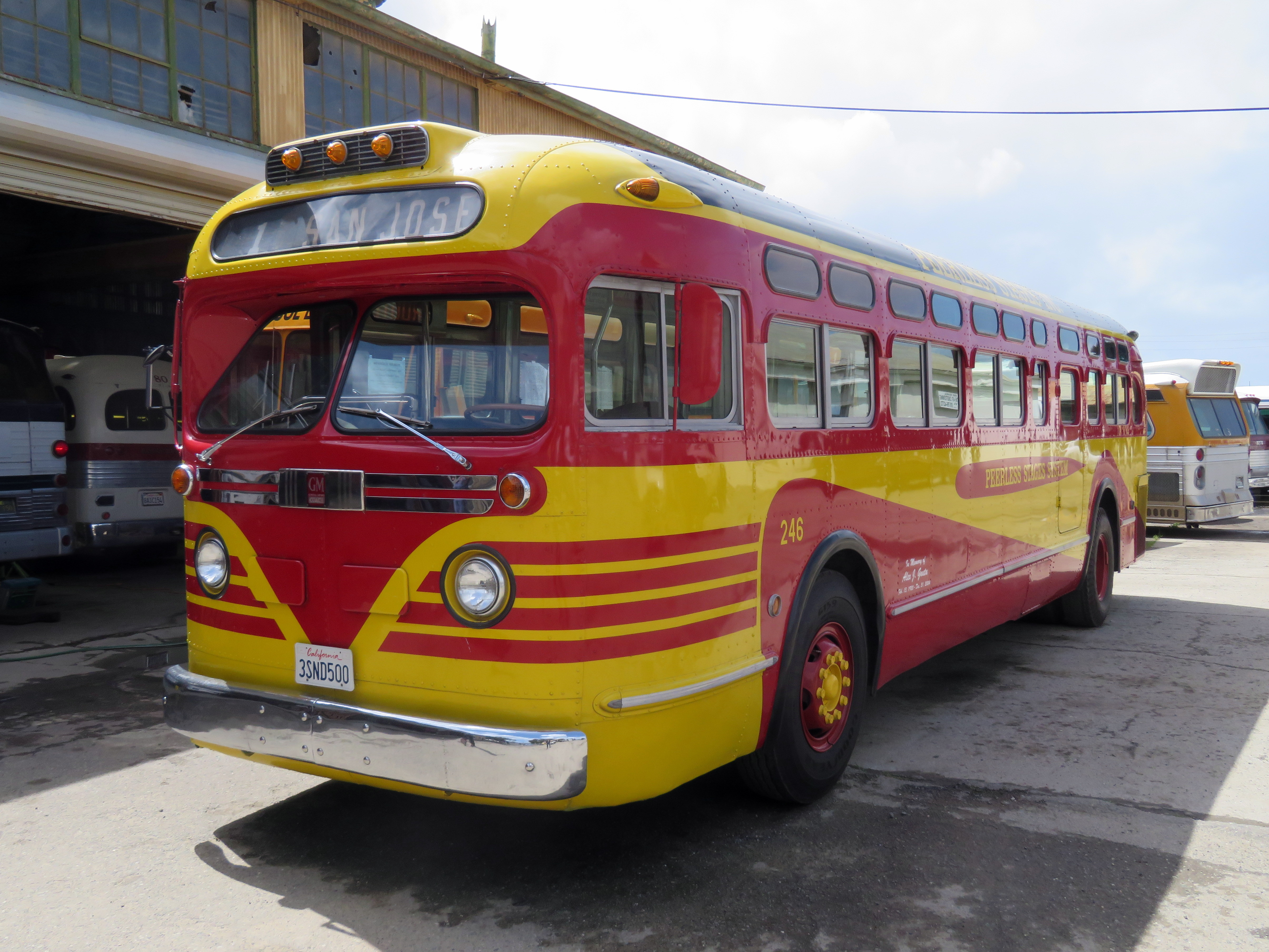
1950s-era Peerless Stages GM Old Look bus, preserved at the Pacific Bus Museum

Direct transportation services over the Santa Cruz Mountains from Santa Cruz to San Jose have operated since 1858, when stagecoach services began. The stagecoach route over the mountains represented a significant improvement over the former route via San Juan Bautista and Watsonville, which had been driven by Charley Parkhurst among others. Travel times were cut from three days to one, and one-way fares dropped from $4.00 ($145 in 2024) to $2.50 ($91).

Stagecoaches were made obsolete when the South Pacific Coast Railroad began service over the Santa Cruz Mountains in 1880, further reducing travel times. The SPC was bought by the Southern Pacific Railroad in 1887, and passenger service over the line continued until February 1940, when severe storms damaged the tracks. Parts of the SPC route continue in operation: the VTA light rail Green Line uses the northern end of the line's right-of-way, and the Santa Cruz, Big Trees and Pacific Railway operates tourist services from Santa Cruz to Felton.

The first bus services over the Santa Cruz Mountains began operation in the early 20th century, taking advantage of continuously improving roads. A direct predecessor of the Highway 17 Express service was an Oakland–San Jose–Santa Cruz bus line operated by Peerless Stages, which began operation in the 1910s or early 1920s. Road improvements culminated with the opening of the four-lane Highway 17 in 1940.

=== 1989 Loma Prieta earthquake ===
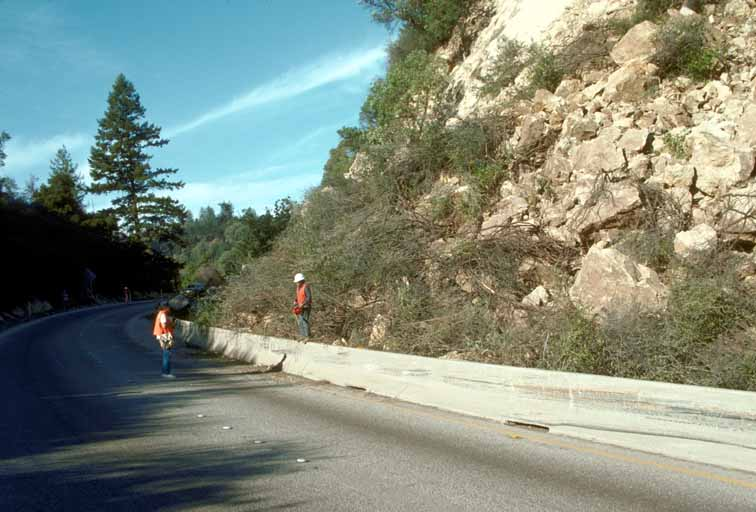
Landslide debris on Highway 17 following the 1989 Loma Prieta earthquake

On October 17, 1989, a major earthquake struck California, with its epicenter near Loma Prieta in the Santa Cruz Mountains. The earthquake had major impacts across Northern California, and caused severe mudslides that partially blocked Highway 17 for weeks. The highway partially reopened in late October, with only buses and carpools allowed.

The transportation authorities in Santa Clara County and Santa Cruz County began operating a joint bus service from Scotts Valley to San Jose on October 24. The service used 9 buses purchased with FEMA funds, and drivers from local tour bus company Discovery Charters. Highway 17 fully reopened to single-occupancy cars in late November, as approximately 200 people rode the service every day. 1,200 letters and petition signatures supported continuing the service after Highway 17 fully reopened, and transit officials made plans to expand it.

=== Permanent service ===
The Highway 17 Express service competed with the established bus service operated by intercity bus line Peerless Stages, which had operated the route without subsidy since the early 20th century. Peerless held exclusive rights to the line, and operated 7 trips per day in each direction in 1989. Peerless charged $3.80 ($9.64 in 2024) for a one-way ticket, nearly four times the $1 ($2.54 in 2024) charged by the emergency commuter service. Peerless objected to the new service, and predicted that it would be discontinued soon after Highway 17 reopened to single-occupancy cars.

The Highway 17 Express was made permanent in late 1990. The Highway 17 Express served over 900 passengers per day in March 1991 when Peerless sued the consortium, arguing that the service's subsidy violated multiple provisions of the California Public Utilities Code. In 1999, the two county transportation authorities formed a joint powers authority to operate the service, with drivers and buses provided by Santa Cruz Metro.

=== Expansion ===
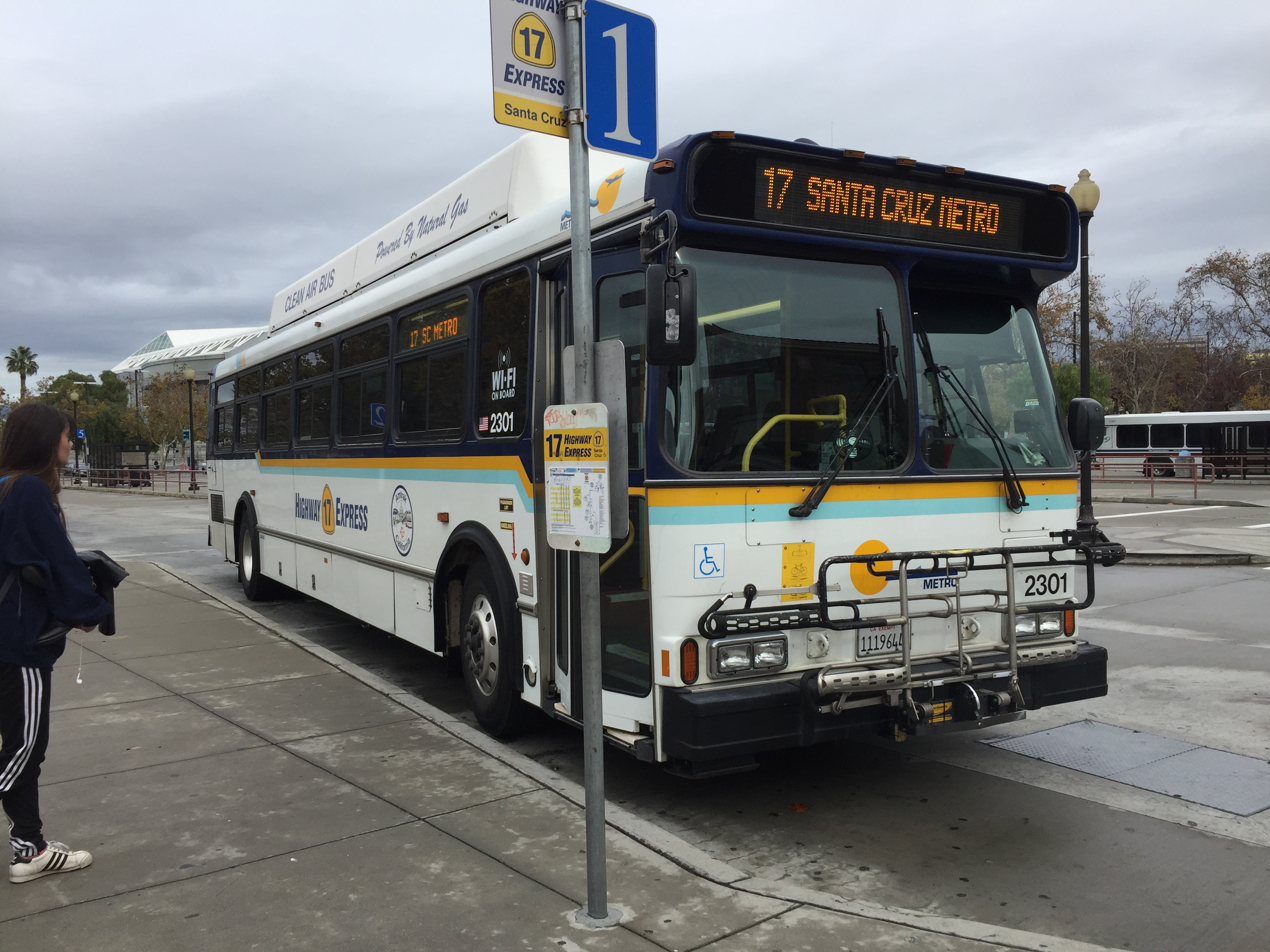
Highway 17 Express bus at San Jose Diridon station in 2016

The San Jose–Santa Cruz Amtrak Thruway bus service was merged with the Highway 17 Express in 2004. The Amtrak service was exclusively available for connecting passengers from Capitol Corridor trains, and served approximately 1200 passengers per month at the time of its discontinuation. When the services were merged, Highway 17 Express service was extended to downtown Santa Cruz, serving the Santa Cruz Metro Center. When the merged service began operation in early 2004, Caltrans anticipated a ridership of 7,000 riders per month by the end of the year. As part of the Amtrak Thruway network, Highway 17 Express tickets are sold through the Amtrak national ticketing network.

In February 2015, Santa Cruz Metro reported 31,102 total riders, 1,239 on the average weekday, for the Highway 17 Express. Greyhound discontinued its service to Santa Cruz in 2020, and entered into a ticketing agreement with Santa Cruz Metro in 2021. The ticketing agreement allows passengers to purchase Highway 17 Express tickets as part of Greyhound itineraries, through the Greyhound and FlixBus sales channels.
