= Santa Cruz Metropolitan Transit District =

Bus service provider in Santa Cruz County, California, United States

Santa Cruz METRO

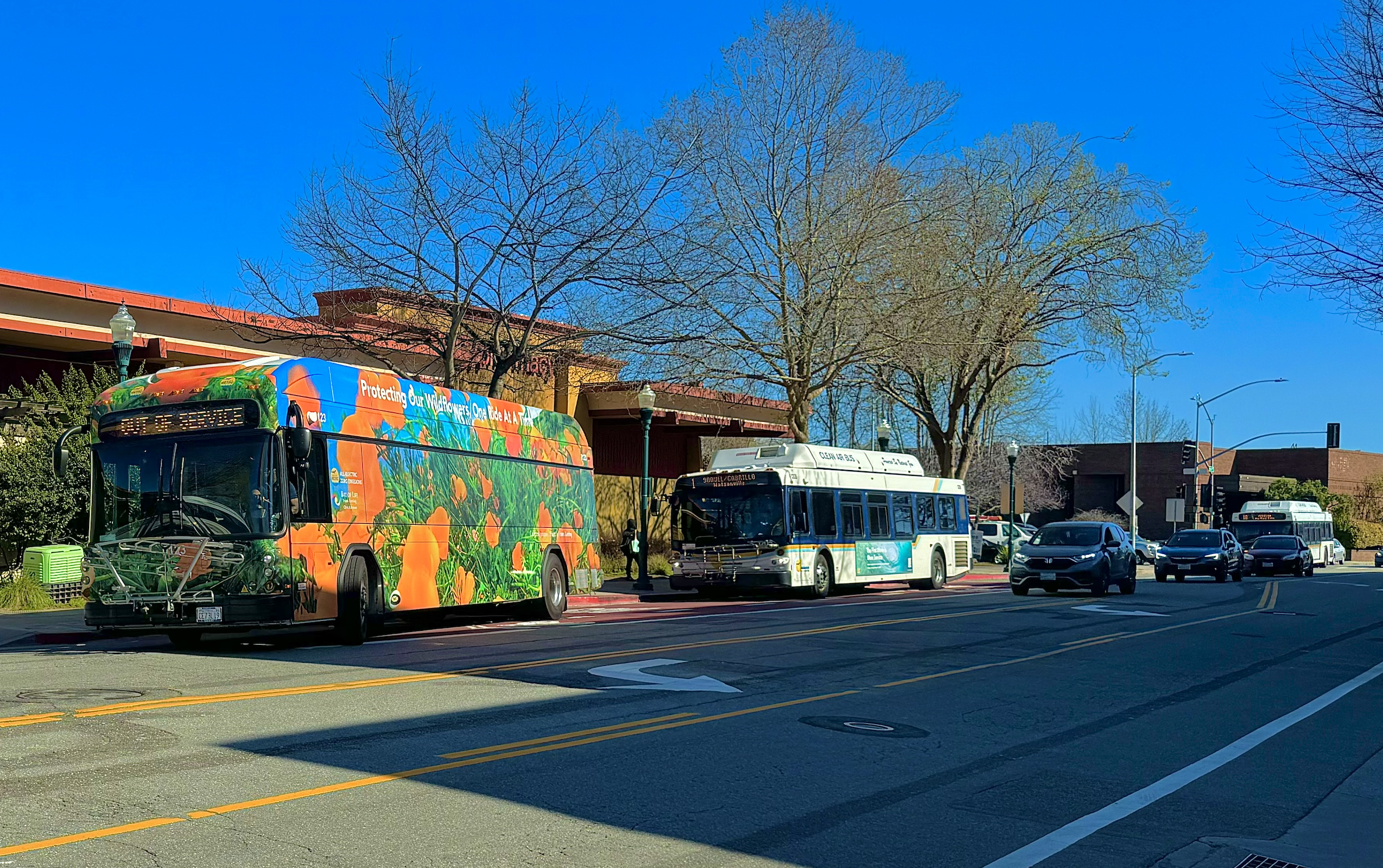
- Temporary River Front Transit Center in downtown Santa Cruz
- Headquarters: 110 Vernon Street; Santa Cruz, California
- Service area: Santa Cruz County
- Service type: bus service; paratransit; express bus service
- Stations: Temporary River Front Transit Center, 603 Front St., Santa Cruz Watsonville Transit Center, 475 Rodriguez St., Watsonville Cavallaro Transit Center (Scotts Valley), 246 Kings Village Rd., Scotts Valley Capitola Mall Transit Center, 1855 41st Ave., Capitola
- Daily ridership: 15,200 (weekdays, Q3 2025)
- Annual ridership: 4,110,800 (2024)
- Chief executive: Corey Aldridge
- Website: scmetro.org

Santa Cruz Metropolitan Transit District (SCMTD), or simply Santa Cruz METRO, provides bus service throughout Santa Cruz County, California. In 2024, the system had a ridership of 4,110,800, or about 15,200 per weekday as of the third quarter of 2025.

Santa Cruz METRO also operates the Highway 17 Express service for Amtrak Thruway between the city of Santa Cruz and San Jose Diridon station, in partnership with Amtrak California and the Santa Clara Valley Transportation Authority.

== History ==
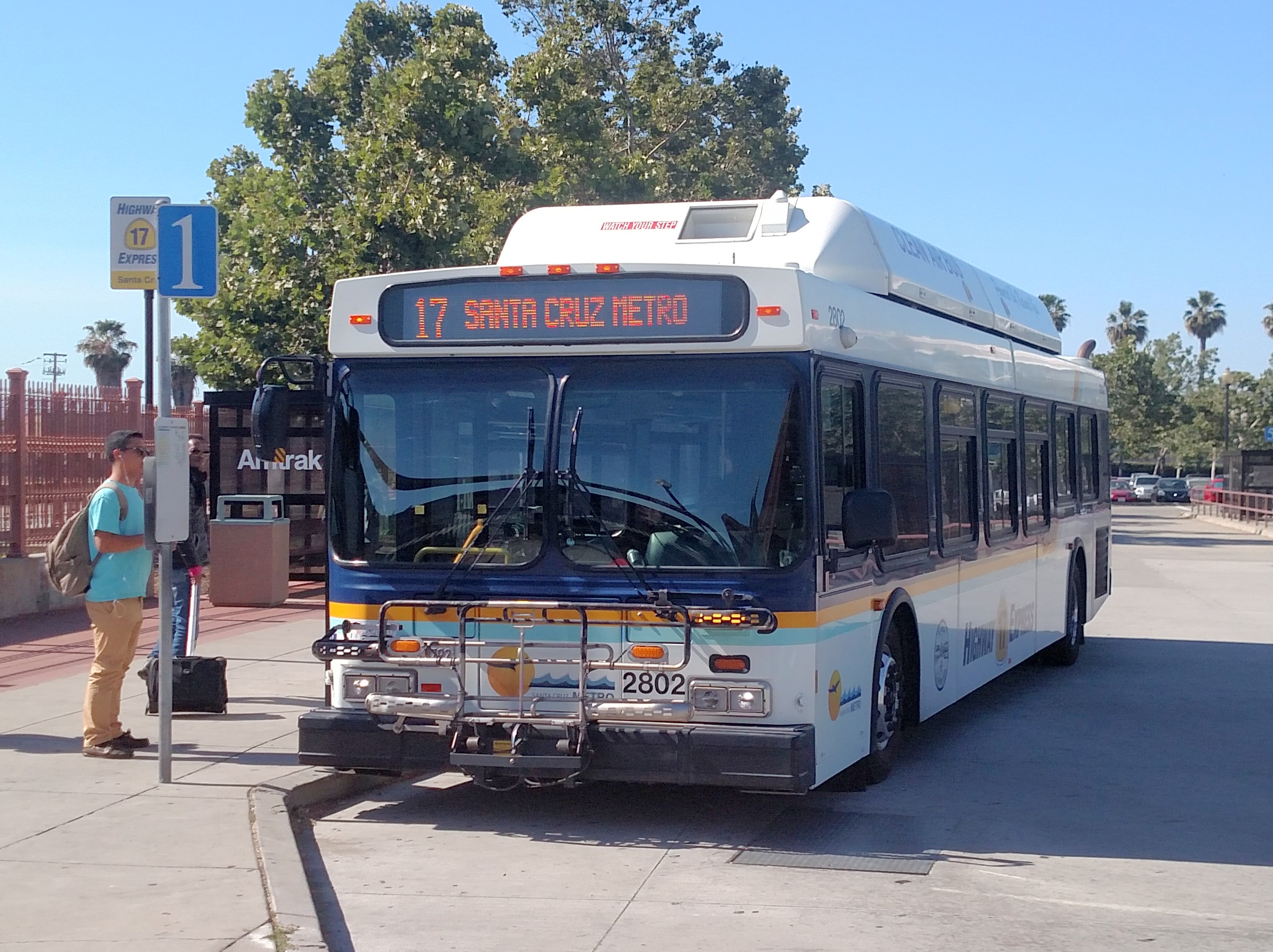
Highway 17 Express bus at San Jose Diridon

Santa Cruz METRO was created in 1968 as a special district within Santa Cruz County with taxing authority. Service was initially to the cities of Santa Cruz, Capitola and Live Oak. Santa Cruz METRO extended service to Watsonville, Scotts Valley and the San Lorenzo Valley in 1974.

In 1979, voters approved a measure to change the financing of Santa Cruz METRO from a property tax to a 1/2 cent sales tax.

The Amtrak Thruway Highway 17 Express service between Santa Cruz and San Jose started as an emergency bus service after the 1989 Loma Prieta earthquake closed Highway 17.

A strike in September 2005 lasted for 35 days and stranded up to 23,000 riders.

In 2011 fixed route service was severely cut then restored mere months later.

In 2012 Santa Cruz METRO received grant funding to construct the Judy K. Souza Operations Facility.

On February 12, 2024, METRO has relocated from the Pacific Metro Center to the new Riverfront Transit Center, which is serving as a temporary transit center until 2026. The existing transit center will be demolished and redeveloped into housing units with a new transit center underneath.

== Routes ==
- Route 1 – Soquel/ Cabrillo/ Airport
- Route 2/2N – Capitola/ Cabrillo/ Main
- Route 3A/3B – Capitola Mall/ Live Oak
- Route 4 – Harvey West
- Route 4W – River/ Harvey West (Weekends Only)
- Route 11 – UCSC via West Gate – High
- Route 16 – UCSC via Main Gate – Laurel/Bay (Mon-Fri Only)
- Route 17 – Highway 17 Express
- Route 18 – UCSC via Main Gate – Mission
- Route 18B – Base of UCSC via Mission (Weekends Only)
- Route 19 – UCSC via West Gate – Bay
- Route 19B – Base of UCSC via Bay (Weekends Only)
- Route 20 – UCSC via Main Gate – Delaware/Western
- Route 34 – Scotts Valley Drive/Emeline (Mon-Fri Only)
- Route 35 – Highway 9/Scotts Valley
- Route 35B – Highway 9/Scotts Valley to Big Basin State Park (Weekends Only)
- Route 35X – Santa Cruz/Boulder Creek Express (Mon-Fri Only)
- Route 40 – Highway 1 - Davenport
- Route 41 – Empire Grade - Bonny Doon
- Route 55 – Cabrillo – Rio Del Mar
- Route 72 – Green Valley – Hospital
- Route 72W – Green Valley – Corralitos (Weekends Only)
- Route 73 – Soquel/ Freedom/ Cabrillo
- Route 74S – Pajaro Valley High School/Hospital
- Route 75 – Green Valley – Wheelock
- Route 78 – Ohlone to Hospital / Freedom Centre
- Route 79 – East Lake
