= Silicon Valley BART extension =

Extension of the Bay Area Rapid Transit system into Santa Clara County

BART Silicon Valley

Overview
- Status: revenue service (to Berryessa); Tunnel boring machine testing and pit excavation at Santa Clara station site; design and engineering elsewhere (to Santa Clara)
- Locale: southern Alameda County and Santa Clara County
- Termini: Fremont; Santa Clara
- Stations: 7 + 2 potential infill
- Website: http://www.vta.org/bart/

Service
- System: BART
- Services: 2
- Depot(s): Newhall
- Rolling stock: Bay Area Rapid Transit rolling stock

History
- Commenced: October 1, 2009
- Planned opening: 2037 (to Santa Clara)
- Opened: March 25, 2017 (to Warm Springs); June 13, 2020 (to Berryessa)

Technical
- Track gauge: 5 ft 6 in (1,676 mm)
- Electrification: Third rail, 1 kV DC
Route map
Red: Warm Springs Extension
Green: BART Silicon Valley Phase I
Blue: BART Silicon Valley Phase II

The Silicon Valley BART extension (officially VTA's BART Silicon Valley Extension Program, commonly known as BART Silicon Valley) is an ongoing effort to expand the Green and Orange Line service by Bay Area Rapid Transit (BART) into Santa Clara County via the East Bay from its former terminus at the Fremont station in Alameda County. Planned since at least 1981, the project has seven stations in three sequential phases.

The first phase, known as the Warm Springs Extension, was built by BART at a cost of $790 million, terminating at the new Warm Springs/South Fremont station. Construction began in 2009, and the extension and new station opened in 2017.

The $2.3-billion second phase, known as BART Silicon Valley Phase I or the Berryessa Extension, includes two new stations, Milpitas and Berryessa/North San José. Construction began in 2012, and the extension and its two new stations were inaugurated on June 12, 2020, while service for the public began on the next day. Many credited the former Mayor of San Jose, Ron Gonzales, with bringing this project to fruition.

The $12.7 billion third phase to downtown San Jose, known as BART Silicon Valley Phase II, is undergoing the early stages of construction, but funding has not been fully finalized. Targeted for completion in 2037, it would add three new subway stations south of Berryessa: 28th Street/Little Portugal, Downtown San José, Diridon, and a surface station in Santa Clara. Initial testing and preliminary construction activities began in January 2019, with excavation of the tunnel boring machine entrance pit in progress as of late 2025.

The Santa Clara Valley Transportation Authority (VTA) built the Berryessa Extension and intends to build the final downtown San Jose extension, but BART operates and maintains the completed portion of the extension and will also do so for the final phase when completed.

== Funding ==
Santa Clara County was originally planned to be part of the BART system, but local governments did not approve. Minor service at Palo Alto near San Mateo County had also been planned originally.

In 2000, Santa Clara County voters approved a 30-year half-cent sales tax increase to fund BART, which took effect in April 2006. To make up for a shortfall in projected federal funding, an increase in the sales tax by 0.125 percent was proposed if additional federal funding were secured. In the process of obtaining the federal funding necessary to build the BART extension, the Federal Transit Administration issued a "Not Recommended" rating in January 2004. The FTA was concerned about the ability of VTA to operate BART and other bus services at the same time. VTA continued to design BART and prepare the required environmental documents.

In 2006, the Santa Clara County Board of Supervisors placed on the ballot for the upcoming primary election a half-cent general sales tax increase for unspecified transportation projects along with other county services. It was advocated for by supporters of the BART Silicon Valley extension and labor groups. The measure would have funded improvements to local hospitals, clinics, and transportation. On June 6, 2006, voters defeated the measure by a margin of 58% to 42%. In December 2006, the VTA board authorized $135 million in contract amendments to continue engineering work and environmental clearance on the extension, with a proposal to bring a tax increase to operate the BART extension before the voters for approval in 2008.

By a two-thirds majority, Santa Clara County voters approved Measure B in November 2008, implementing a 30-year, 1/8-cent local sales tax dedicated solely to funding the operating and maintenance costs associated with the BART Silicon Valley extension. The 2008 Measure B sales tax took effect in July 2012.

The economy worsened in 2009, and the 2000 sales tax was projected to generate $7 billion—short of the originally expected $11 billion. As a consequence, the number of planned stations was reduced. In addition, the line from Berryessa to downtown San Jose was delayed until 2026, pushed back from 2025.

VTA awarded $770 million to Skanska-Shimmick-Herzog in 2011 for the first phase of the Berryessa Extension (Milpitas and Berryessa/North San Jose Stations), and the federal government granted $900 million for the project in 2012. Construction began the same year. It was scheduled to open in 2016.

For phase II, VTA sought funding from the federal New Starts program in 2016. A half-cent 30-year sales tax passed in the 2016 elections, to raise $6.0 to $6.5 billion with up to 25% of this (or $1.6 billion) for BART. VTA also sought $1.5 billion from New Starts, and $750 million from the California Cap and Trade program.

In 2018, VTA was awarded $2.6 billion for the project from the state's Transit and Intercity Rail Capital Program funded by the 2017 gas tax bill. In August 2019, the VTA received $125 million from the FTA under a new accelerated funding program.

$140 million was included in the version of the American Rescue Plan Act of 2021 passed by the House of Representatives, but was dropped in the Senate.

In August 2024, the FTA made a commitment to grant $5 billion for Phase II. VTA plans to apply for a Full Funding Grant Agreement from the FTA after covering existing funding gaps.

== Phases ==
The project is broken into three phases.

Phase	Name	Length	Stations	Groundbreaking	Opening	Cost ($ billions)	Ref.
1	Warm Springs (WSX)	5.4 mi (8.7 km)	Irvington (Note: Future infill station)	Sep 30, 2009 (Note: Groundbreaking for the construction of the Fremont subway section occurred in 2009. Preliminary site preparation work for the Paseo Padre/Washington grade separation project began in June 2005.)	Mar 25, 2017	0.79	
1	Warm Springs (WSX)	5.4 mi (8.7 km)	Warm Springs	Sep 30, 2009	Mar 25, 2017	0.79	
2	Berryessa (SVX Phase 1)	10 mi (16 km)	Calaveras	Apr 12, 2012	Jun 13, 2020	2.3	
2	Berryessa (SVX Phase 1)	10 mi (16 km)	Milpitas	Apr 12, 2012	Jun 13, 2020	2.3	
2	Berryessa (SVX Phase 1)	10 mi (16 km)	Berryessa	Apr 12, 2012	Jun 13, 2020	2.3	
3	Downtown San Jose/ Santa Clara (SVX Phase 2)	6 mi (9.7 km)	28th Street/Little Portugal	Jun 14, 2024 (Note: Preliminary subsurface exploration started in late January 2019.)	2037 (planned)	12.7	
3	Downtown San Jose/ Santa Clara (SVX Phase 2)	6 mi (9.7 km)	Downtown San José	Jun 14, 2024	2037 (planned)	12.7	
3	Downtown San Jose/ Santa Clara (SVX Phase 2)	6 mi (9.7 km)	Diridon	Jun 14, 2024	2037 (planned)	12.7	
3	Downtown San Jose/ Santa Clara (SVX Phase 2)	6 mi (9.7 km)	Santa Clara	Jun 14, 2024	2037 (planned)	12.7	

=== Warm Springs extension ===
Map of the Warm Springs Extension

The 5.4-mile-long (8.7 km) extension to Warm Springs was constructed by BART south from the existing Fremont station (opened in 1972) to the new Warm Springs/South Fremont station; revenue service began in March 2017. The original estimate was $890 million, but the cost of the subway segment under Lake Elizabeth was reduced by 45% from the original estimate of $249 million to $136 million, bringing the total cost to $790 million.

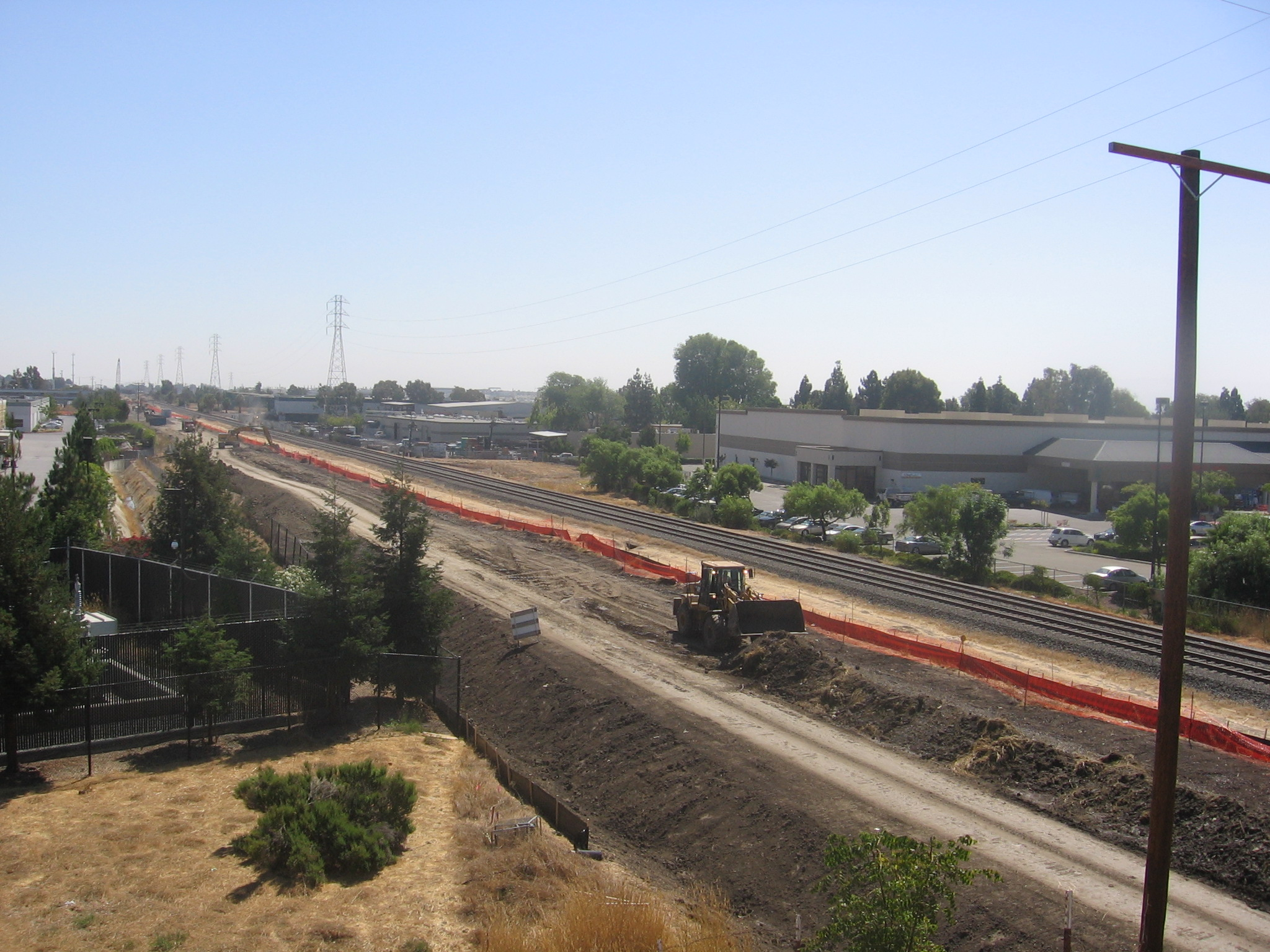
Construction on the Warm Springs extension underway in Fremont, September 12, 2012

The Warm Springs/South Fremont station opened on March 25, 2017. The extension broke ground in 2009, and was originally scheduled for completion in 2014. Construction of the station began in 2011, and was expected to take three and a half years. However, the opening was delayed repeatedly, and ultimately pushed back to spring 2017.

The Berryessa Extension extends south from the Warm Springs/South Fremont station.

=== Berryessa extension ===
Map of Berryessa and downtown San Jose/Santa Clara extensions from Warm Springs

The 10-mile-long (16 km) Berryessa extension to north San Jose encompasses the Milpitas station and the Berryessa station. A proposed infill station at Calaveras Boulevard in downtown Milpitas has been deferred until the city secures funding. Milpitas Station connects to VTA's Milpitas light rail station (formerly known as Montague station) near the Great Mall of the Bay Area via a pedestrian bridge.

Originally the entire Silicon Valley Extension from Fremont to Santa Clara was proposed as one megaproject, but lower than expected federal funding and sales tax revenue eliminated some stations from the original project and caused the division into two phases. Phase 1 extends to Berryessa, and Phase 2 will extend through downtown San Jose to Santa Clara. The Phase 1 scope was set by what VTA could afford. A local industrial park sued in 2011, without success, on environmental grounds claiming that the extension would reduce vehicular access.

The project saw numerous delays, and completion was pushed back many times from the originally-planned 2016.

Milpitas and Berryessa/North San José stations opened on June 13, 2020.

=== Downtown San Jose/Santa Clara extension ===
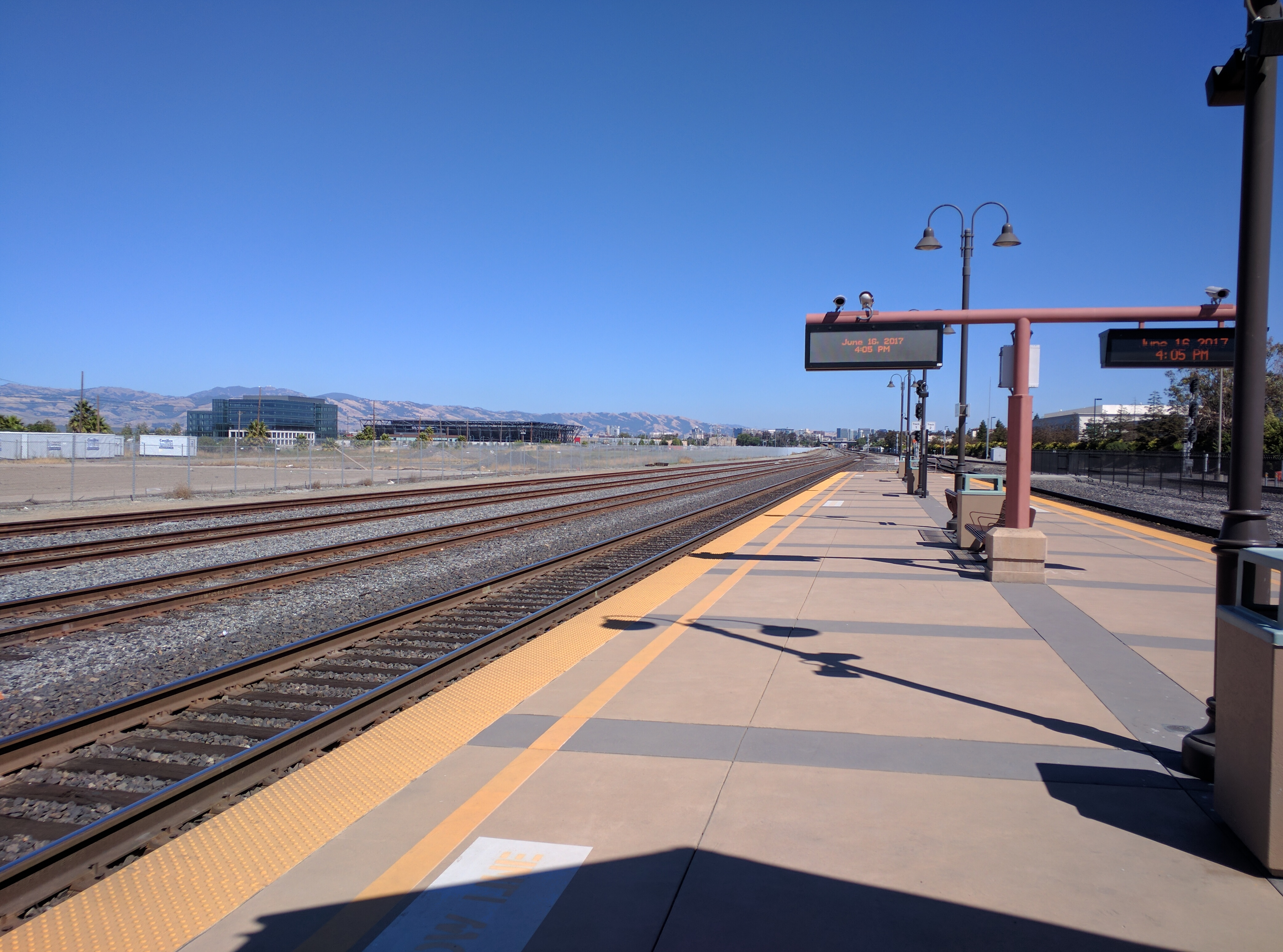
Site for planned Santa Clara BART station and Newhall Yard, taken in 2017 from the island platform of the Santa Clara Caltrain station. PayPal Park (then Avaya Stadium) can be seen in the background.

The final Downtown San Jose/Santa Clara leg has been planned through downtown San Jose to Santa Clara at an estimated cost of $6.8 billion. This third phase, 6 miles (9.7 km) long, is largely underground, featuring a 5-mile-long (8.0 km) tunnel. It would continue south from Berryessa, entering a tunnel to cross the Bayshore Freeway before continuing to a 28th Street/Little Portugal station on the city's "east side". From there, the tunnel would continue west under Santa Clara Street to a Downtown San Jose subway station, which would be an interchange station to VTA light rail lines on the surface at Santa Clara. The original proposal had additional subway stations between Alum Rock and Downtown at Civic Plaza/SJSU and Plaza de César Chávez, but these were consolidated into a single station to cut costs. The line would continue underground to the San Jose Diridon station, a transfer point to Amtrak, Caltrain, Altamont Corridor Express, VTA light rail and bus, and the planned California High-Speed Rail system. The proposed BART subway station would be named "Diridon" to match. The extension would then surface and continue to the site of the current Santa Clara Caltrain Station. A 40-acre (16 ha) BART maintenance yard would also be created at Newhall as part of this phase, using land just south of Santa Clara station that was purchased by VTA from Union Pacific. Like the Berryessa Extension, it would be built by VTA, but operated by BART.

After funding was secured for Berryessa (the first phase of the Silicon Valley Extension) in March 2012, VTA began looking for additional funding to complete the $6.8 billion second phase.

In late 2017, a disagreement arose between VTA and BART over whether the tunnel should have a single bore or dual bores. VTA favored a single 45-foot-wide (14 m) bore, configured as a double-deck stack, with one track on the upper level and one on the lower level. VTA preferred a single bore to shorten the construction schedule and avoid cut and cover construction on Santa Clara Street for station sites. City officials believed cut and cover construction would be disruptive to streets and businesses, citing the construction of the Market Street subway as evidence. The single-bore design is newer, but less tested in the United States. However, BART preferred dual bores, as used elsewhere in its system, to cut construction cost and standardize the procedure for emergency evacuations. The twin bores would each be 20 feet (6.1 m) wide, and separated horizontally. Local businesses, cities and VTA were lobbying for a single bore in 2018. The design decision was postponed for three months; in March, BART and VTA reached agreement on a single bore. The $125 million contract for engineering the single bore tunnel was awarded to a joint venture bid placed by London-based Mott MacDonald and San Francisco-based PGH Wong Engineering.

Initial construction and soil sampling began in January 2019. In September, it was announced that the project would be delayed three to four years, with revenue service to begin in 2029–2030. On October 15, 2021, VTA announced that it would award construction contracts for this phase's stations in summer 2022. In May 2022, the first major contract for the Downtown San Jose/Santa Clara extension was awarded to Kiewit Shea Traylor Joint Venture, a joint venture between Kiewit Corporation, J. F. Shea Co. and Traylor Brothers, Inc. KSTJV will bore the 4-mile tunnel from Berryessa to Diridon, and construct the 1-mile above-ground track from Diridon to Santa Clara. In October 2023, it was announced that the project would be further delayed until 2036. In June 2025, agency staff recommended that the Kiewit Shea Traylor contract be terminated, and a new contractor found, because the agency and the contractor could not agree on costs. This was estimated to add 18 months of delay.

== See also ==
- Bay Area Rapid Transit expansion
- List of Bay Area Rapid Transit stations
