= San Fernando station (VTA) =

VTA light rail station in San Jose, California

San Fernando
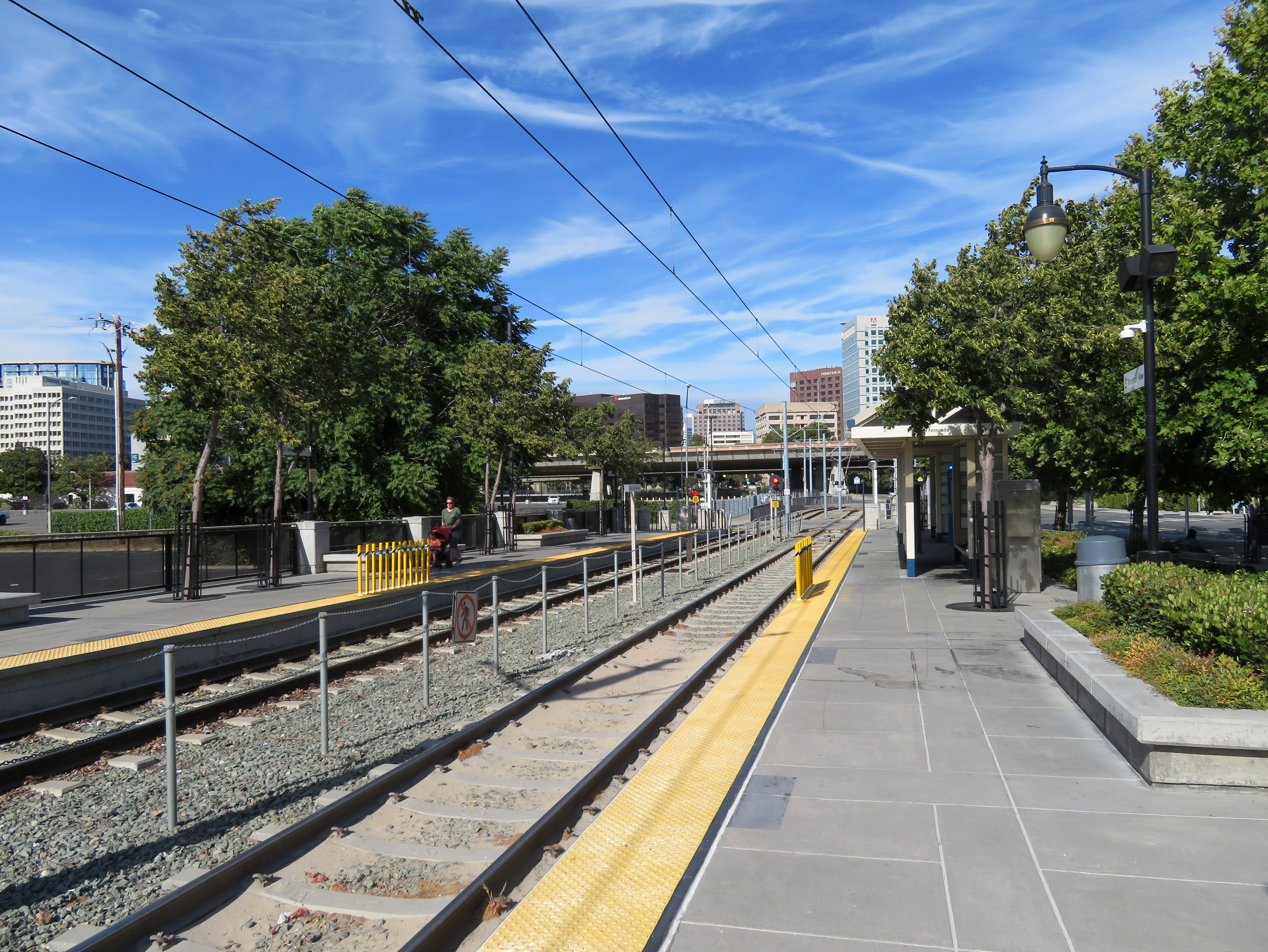
- San Fernando station in July 2018

General information
- Location: 441 West San Fernando Street; San Jose, California
- Coordinates: 37°19′49″N 121°53′54″W
- Owner: Santa Clara Valley Transportation Authority
- Platforms: 2 side platforms
- Tracks: 2

Construction
- Accessible: Yes

History
- Opened: August 1, 2005

Services
Preceding station	VTA	Following station
Convention Center toward Old Ironsides	Green Line	San Jose Diridon toward Winchester
Convention Center toward Civic Center	Holly Trolley Christmastime only	San Jose Diridon Terminus
Location

San Fernando station (officially San Fernando/SAP Center station) is a light rail station operated by Santa Clara Valley Transportation Authority. It is located along West San Fernando Street, between Delmas Avenue and South Autumn Street in San Jose, California. The station is located about three blocks away from the SAP Center at San Jose and one block away from a trailhead for the Guadalupe River Trail.

The station has two side platforms and two trackways. San Fernando station is served by the Green Line of the VTA light rail system.

The station was opened in 2005 as part of VTA's Vasona light rail extension.

== History ==
San Fernando Station was built as part of the Vasona Light Rail extension project. This project extended VTA light rail service from the intersection of Woz Way and West San Carlos St in San Jose in a southwesterly direction to the Winchester station in western Campbell.

The official opening date for this station was to be October 1, 2005; however, service to San Fernando station and San Jose Diridon station started earlier than planned with a soft launch the weekend of July 29, 30, and 31, 2005 to accommodate attendees of the inaugural San Jose Grand Prix race. San Fernando station and San Jose Diridon station opened for normal revenue service on August 1, 2005 and the rest of the line opened on October 1, 2005.

The construction of this station and the rest of the Vasona Light Rail extension was part of the 1996 Measure B Transportation Improvement Program. Santa Clara County voters approved the Measure B project in 1996 along with a half-percent sales tax increase. The Vasona Light Rail extension was funded mostly by the resulting sales tax revenues with additional money coming from federal and state funding, grants, VTA bond revenues, and municipal contributions.

== Architecture/public art ==
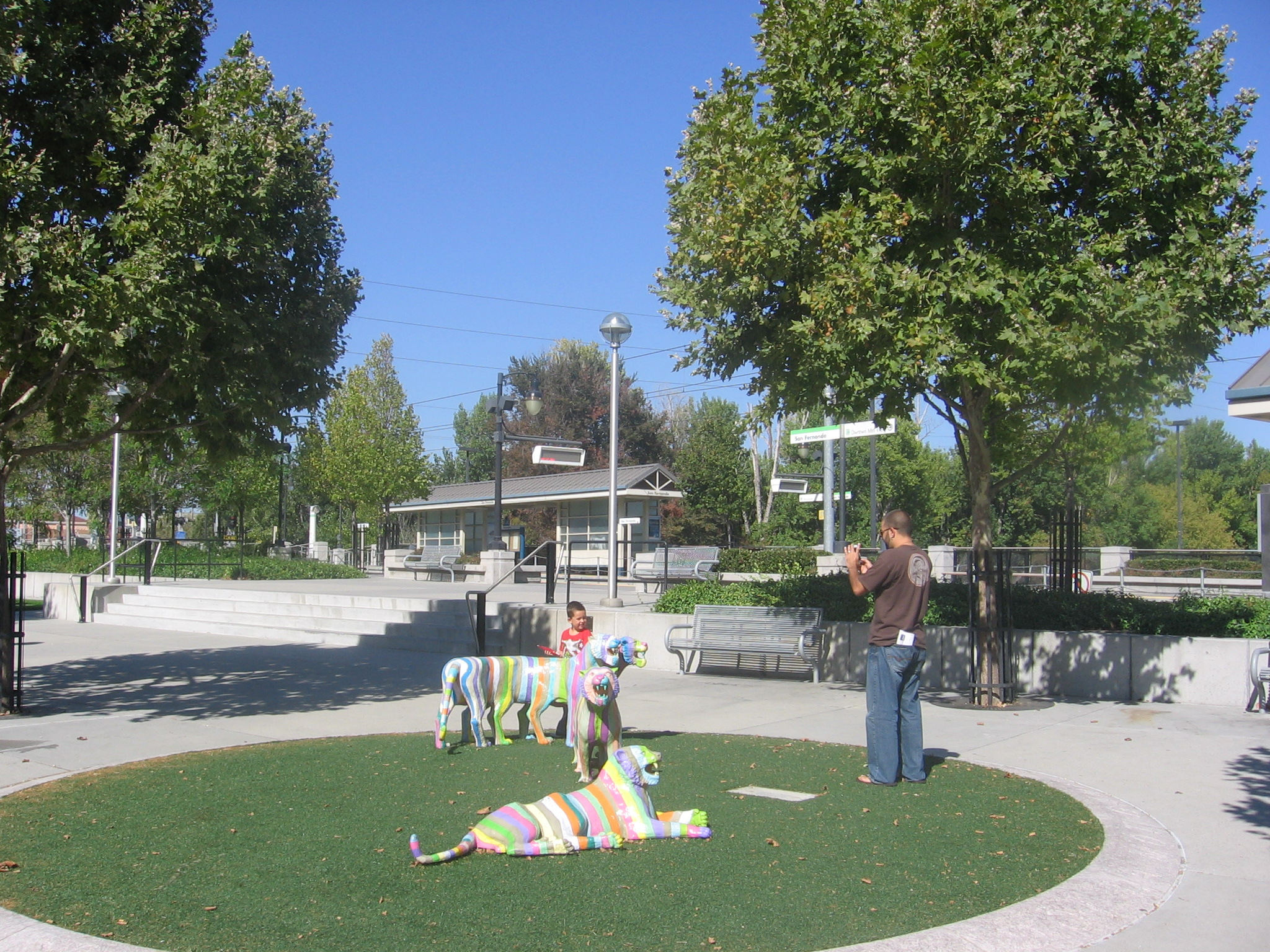
Iiona Malka Rich sculptures and aficionados, September 22, 2012

The San Fernando Station features three public art sculptures. They are entitled “King of the Urban Jungle,” “Simba × 2,” and “Lying Beast.” All three statues are arranged together on a small circular piece of lawn on the south edge of the station.

"Artist Iiona Malka Rich created this sculpture of three, multicolored striped lions with illuminating eyes (using fiber optics) from a bronze-like material. One has eight legs with two heads, and the other two lions have six legs each. The theme for this art feature is “Life is a Circus” which is inscribed around the base of the artwork. In addition, lion footprints are “stamped” on the ground through the plaza to replicate the natural movement of these unique animals."
