= Irvington station (BART) =

Planned infill stop in Fremont, California

Irvington
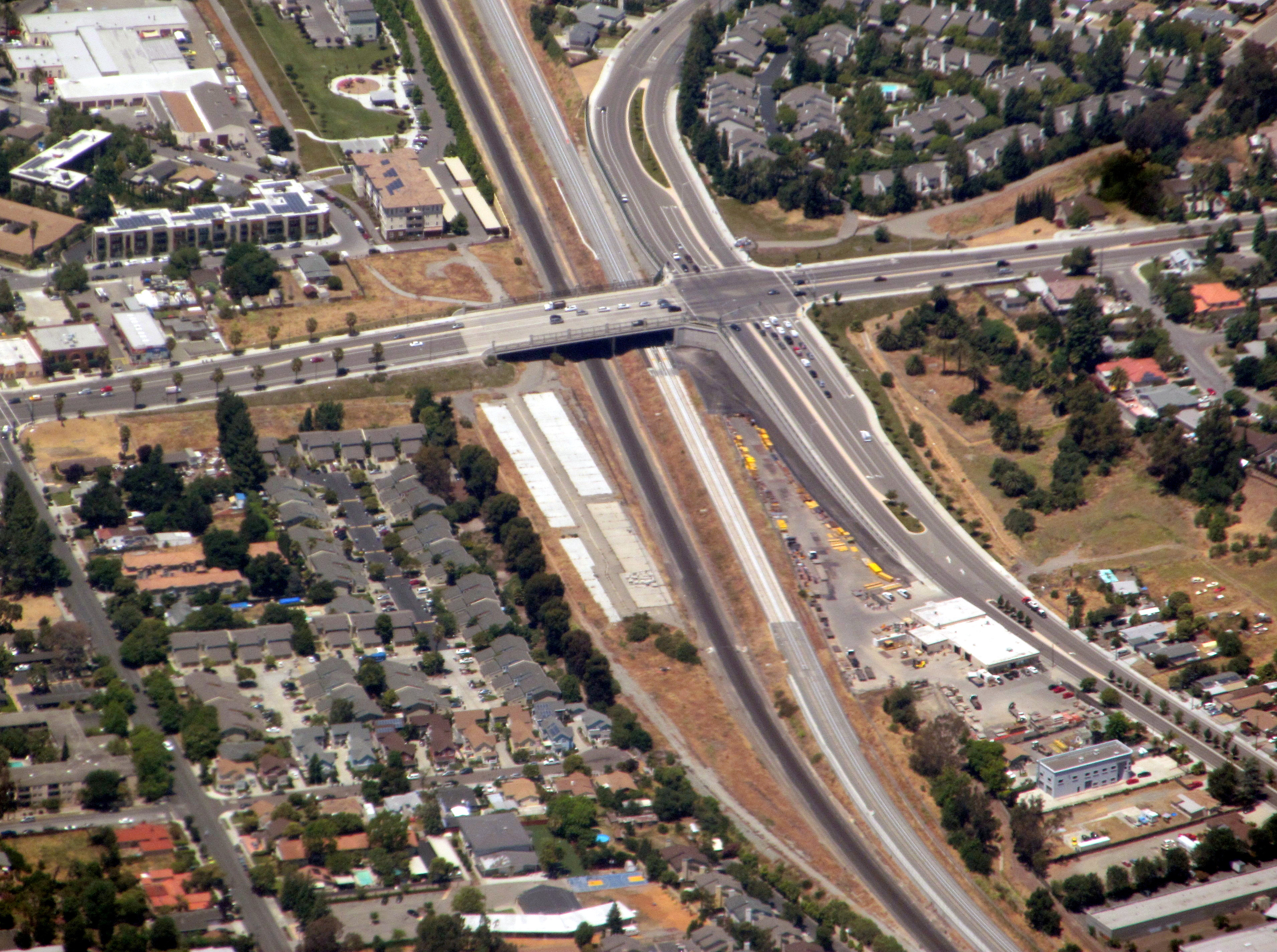
- Aerial view of the planned station site, in June 2017

General information
- Location: Osgood Road at Washington Boulevard; Fremont, California
- Coordinates: 37.5318°N 121.9537°W
- Platforms: 2 side platforms
- Tracks: 2

Construction
- Structure type: At-grade
- Accessible: Yes

Other information
- Status: design stage

History
- Opening: 2031; 5 years' time (proposed)

Proposed services
Preceding station	Bay Area Rapid Transit	Following station
Fremont toward Richmond	Orange Line	Warm Springs toward Berryessa/North San José
Fremont toward Daly City	Green Line	Warm Springs toward Berryessa/North San José
Location

Irvington is a planned Bay Area Rapid Transit (BART) infill station in the Irvington District of Fremont, California. As of November 2023, estimates from the city anticipated construction to begin in mid-2026, with the station opening for service in 2031.

== History ==
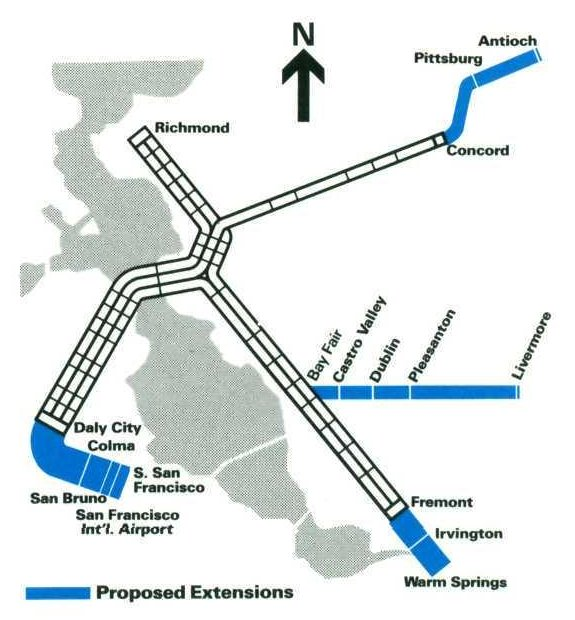
A 1980 map showing proposed BART extensions, featuring Irvington

The station has been planned since it was studied as part of the Warm Springs extension in 1979, and its construction was approved by the BART board in 1992.

The Warm Springs extension began construction through the Irvington District in 2009, to connect Fremont and Warm Springs. The proposed station at the center of Irvington, once considered optional, was part of the extension. However funding for construction of the station fell through. The station had been envisioned for completion in 2015. Provisions for personnel access and preliminary foundation work were included when track was laid through the site.

The city of Fremont had planned to finance the $140 million station through redevelopment agency bonds in 2009, but the bonds were cancelled when the California State Legislature abolished the redevelopment agency. In 2014, Measure BB and the Alameda County Transportation Expenditure Plan received voter approval with $120 million listed for the Irvington BART station that was contingent on full definition of the capital project and its inclusion in a future Capital Improvement Program. A reevaluation of the environmental impact study was undertaken by the city in 2017.

The BART Board of Directors confirmed they had voted to authorize the Irvington station in August 2019, with construction to start in August 2022 and complete by August 2026. As of November 2023, the start of construction was pushed back to mid-2026 and the station opening to 2031.
