= 28th Street/Little Portugal station =

Planned BART station in San Jose, California

28th St/Little Portugal

General information
- Location: 28th Street; San Jose, CA
- Coordinates: 37.3513°N 121.86509°W
- Owner: Bay Area Rapid Transit
- Platforms: 1 island platform
- Tracks: 2

Construction
- Structure type: Cut-and-cover
- Accessible: Yes

History
- Opening: 2036; 10 years' time (estimated)

Services
Preceding station	Bay Area Rapid Transit	Following station
Future service
Berryessa/North San José toward Richmond	Orange Line Silicon Valley extension	Downtown San José toward Santa Clara
Berryessa/North San José toward Daly City	Green Line Silicon Valley extension	Downtown San José toward Santa Clara
Route map
Location

28th Street/Little Portugal station is a planned underground Bay Area Rapid Transit station in the Little Portugal neighborhood of San Jose, California. It would be located north of East Santa Clara Street between North 28th Street and U.S. Route 101, behind Five Wounds Portuguese National Church. Preceded by Berryessa/North San José station, it would be the first station of the Phase II portion of the Silicon Valley BART extension. The station would have direct service to Santa Clara, Richmond, and San Francisco/Daly City.

When this station, and all the Silicon Valley Extension stations, is completed, it will be served by the Green and Orange Lines.

== History ==
A separate extension was built from Fremont to Warm Springs/South Fremont station in the Warm Springs District (also in Fremont). This was followed by phase I of the Silicon Valley BART extension into eastern San Jose, built by VTA. The entire San Jose/Santa Clara extension, including Alum Rock station (as it was referred to at the time), was originally intended to be built in a single project, but funding could not be secured; therefore, the San Jose extension was split into two phases, and Alum Rock was placed in the second phase.

In planning, the station was referred to as Alum Rock/28th Street, after the Alum Rock neighborhood to the northeast. On November 7, 2019, VTA renamed the station to 28th Street/Little Portugal in response to community feedback. If funding is secured, construction is slated to begin in 2024, and open to passenger service in 2036. This station will be located between the Berryessa/North San José and Downtown San José stations and will be served by VTA buses.
