= Downtown San José station =

Planned underground BART stop

Downtown San José

General information
- Location: Santa Clara Street; San Jose, California
- Coordinates: 37.33635°N 121.89002°W
- Owner: VTA (operated by Bay Area Rapid Transit)
- Platforms: 2 split platforms
- Tracks: 2
- Connections: at Santa Clara station

Construction
- Structure type: Split platform
- Accessible: Yes

History
- Opening: 2036; 10 years' time (estimated)

Services
Preceding station	Bay Area Rapid Transit	Following station
Future service
28th Street/Little Portugal toward Richmond	Orange Line Silicon Valley extension	Diridon toward Santa Clara
28th Street/Little Portugal toward Daly City	Green Line Silicon Valley extension	Diridon toward Santa Clara
Route map
Location

Downtown San José station is a proposed underground Bay Area Rapid Transit station underneath Santa Clara Street in Downtown San Jose, planned as part of Silicon Valley BART extension Phase II. The station would be co-located with the Santa Clara Valley Transportation Authority's existing Santa Clara light rail station, and be located between the proposed 28th Street/Little Portugal station and a transfer station at San Jose Diridon Station. The station eventually connects to the proposed Santa Clara BART station. Revenue service, which will be served by the Orange and Green Lines, is envisioned to start in 2036.

== History ==
The original plan for the Silicon Valley BART extension included the Downtown San José station, but full funding could not be secured and the San Jose extension was split into two phases. Phase I, completed on June 13, 2020, was the extension to Berryessa/North San José station. The proposed Downtown San José station is part of a later, unfunded phase II of the Silicon Valley BART extension and would be located between the proposed 28th Street/Little Portugal and Diridon BART stations. Construction is planned to begin in 2024, and revenue service to start in 2036.
