= San Jose Diridon station =

Transit hub in San Jose, California, U.S.

San Jose Diridon
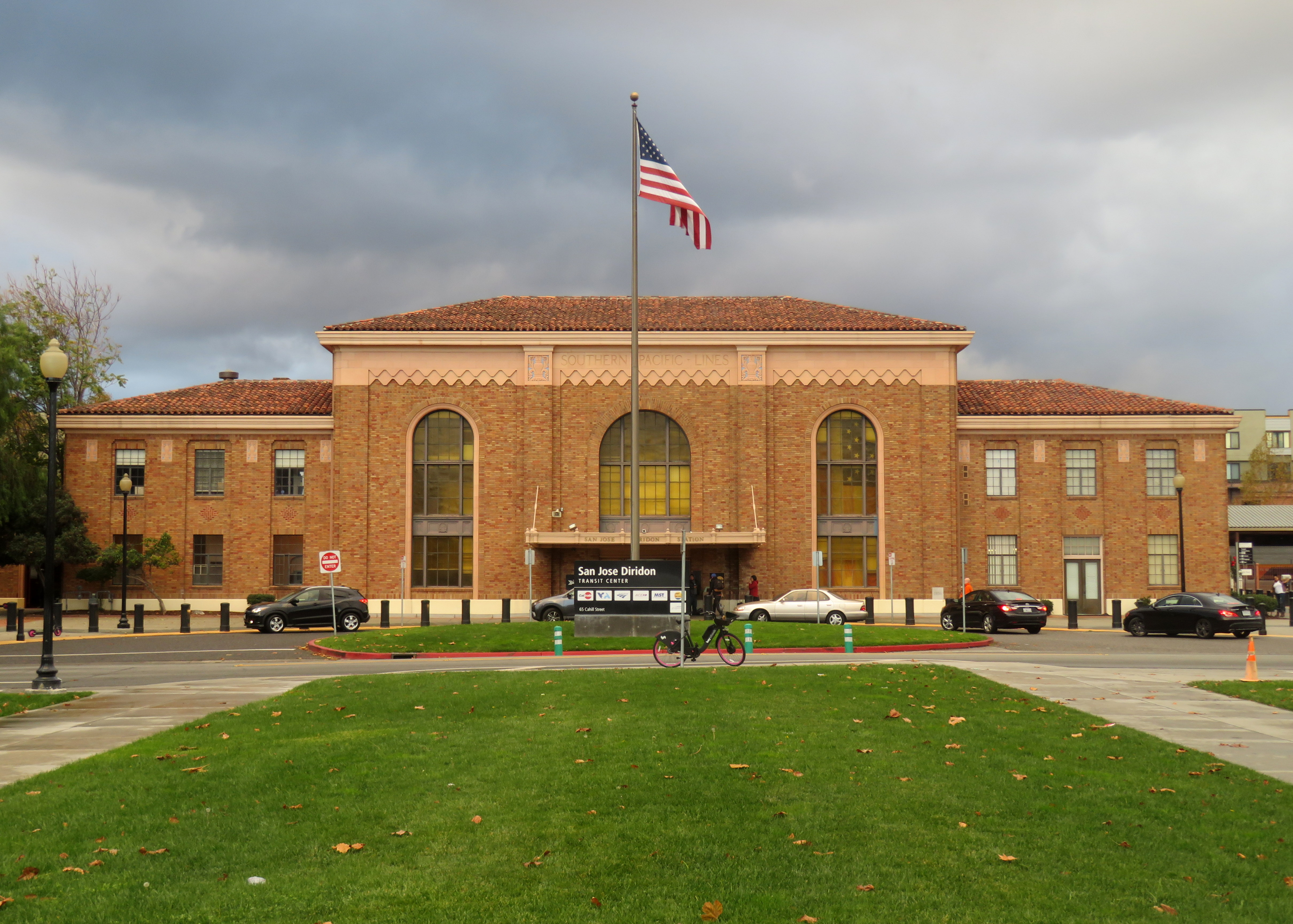
- San Jose Diridon station in November 2019

General information
- Location: 65 Cahill Street; San Jose, California; United States
- Coordinates: 37°19′48″N 121°54′11″W
- Owner: Peninsula Corridor Joint Powers Board (PCJPB)
- Line: PCJPB Peninsula Subdivision
- Platforms: 1 side platform, 4 island platforms (Amtrak/Caltrain/ACE); 2 side platforms (VTA)
- Tracks: 9 (Amtrak/Caltrain/ACE); 2 (VTA)
- Connections: VTA Bus: 22, 64A, 64B, 68, Rapid 500, Rapid 522, Rapid 568, SCVMC Shuttle; Amtrak Thruway: 6, 17, 21, 40; Santa Cruz METRO: Highway 17 Express; Greyhound

Construction
- Parking: Yes; paid
- Cycle facilities: Racks
- Accessible: Yes

Other information
- Station code: Amtrak: SJC
- Fare zone: 4 (Caltrain)

History
- Opened: December 1935; August 1, 2005 (VTA)
- Opening: 2036 (BART)
- Rebuilt: 1994
- Former names: Cahill Depot
- Original company: Southern Pacific

Passengers
- FY 2025: 2,136 (weekday avg.) ▲38%
- FY 2025: 156,081 (annually) (Amtrak)
Services
Preceding station	Amtrak	Following station
Santa Clara–University toward Auburn	Capitol Corridor	Terminus
Oakland–Jack London Square toward Seattle	Coast Starlight	Salinas toward Los Angeles
Preceding station	Caltrain	Following station
Santa Clara or College Park toward San Francisco	Local	Tamien Limited service Terminus
Santa Clara toward San Francisco	Limited	Terminus
Sunnyvale toward San Francisco	Express	Terminus
Santa Clara toward San Francisco	Weekend Local	Tamien Limited service Terminus
Terminus	South County Connector	Tamien toward Gilroy
Preceding station	Altamont Corridor Express	Following station
Santa Clara toward Stockton	San Jose – Stockton	Terminus
Preceding station	VTA	Following station
San Fernando toward Old Ironsides	Green Line	Race Street toward Winchester
San Fernando toward Civic Center	Holly Trolley Christmastime only	Terminus
Former services
Preceding station	Amtrak	Following station
Oakland-16th Street toward Sacramento	Spirit of California	Salinas toward Los Angeles
Preceding station	Caltrain	Following station
Santa Clara or College Park toward San Francisco	Local (L1)	Tamien Terminus
Santa Clara toward San Francisco	Weekend Local (L2)	Tamien Terminus
Lawrance or College Park toward San Francisco	Limited (L3)	Tamien toward Tamien or Gilroy
Santa Clara or College Park toward San Francisco	Limited (L4)	Tamien toward Tamien or Gilroy
Santa Clara toward San Francisco	Limited (L5)	Tamien Terminus
Mountain View toward San Francisco	Baby Bullet (B7)	Terminus
Preceding station	Southern Pacific Railroad	Following station
Santa Clara toward San Francisco	Coast Line	Tamien toward Los Angeles
Milpitas toward Oakland Pier	Oakland – San Jose	Terminus
Terminus	San Jose – Santa Cruz	Campbell toward Santa Cruz
Santa Clara toward Oakland Pier	South Pacific Coast Railroad	Campbell toward Santa Cruz
Future services
Preceding station	Amtrak	Following station
Santa Clara–University toward Auburn	Capitol Corridor	Tamien toward Salinas
Oakland–Jack London Square toward Seattle	Coast Starlight	Pajaro/Watsonville toward Los Angeles
Preceding station	Bay Area Rapid Transit	Following station
Downtown San José toward Richmond	Orange Line Silicon Valley extension	Santa Clara Terminus
Downtown San José toward Daly City	Green Line Silicon Valley extension	Santa Clara Terminus
Preceding station	California High-Speed Rail	Following station
Millbrae–SFO toward San Francisco	Phase 1	Gilroy toward Merced or Anaheim
- Southern Pacific Depot
- U.S. National Register of Historic Places
- Architect: John H. Christie
- Architectural style: Italian Renaissance Revival
- NRHP reference No.: 93000274
- Added to NRHP: April 1, 1993
Track layout
Key
Location

San Jose Diridon station is the central passenger rail depot for San Jose, California. It also serves as a major intermodal transit center for Santa Clara County and Silicon Valley. The station is named after former Santa Clara County Supervisor Rod Diridon Sr.

The station is on the Union Pacific Railroad Coast Line tracks (formerly Southern Pacific Transportation Company) at 65 Cahill Street in San Jose. The depot is listed on the National Register of Historic Places for its Italian Renaissance Revival style architectural and historical significance.

The station is served by Caltrain, ACE, VTA light rail, and Amtrak trains. The bus plaza at the station is served by Amtrak Thruway, Greyhound, Monterey–Salinas Transit, Santa Cruz METRO (Highway 17 Express), and VTA buses.

Bay Area Rapid Transit (BART) Green and Orange Line metro service to a new underground station is projected to begin in 2036 with the completion of the Silicon Valley BART extension.

== Architecture ==
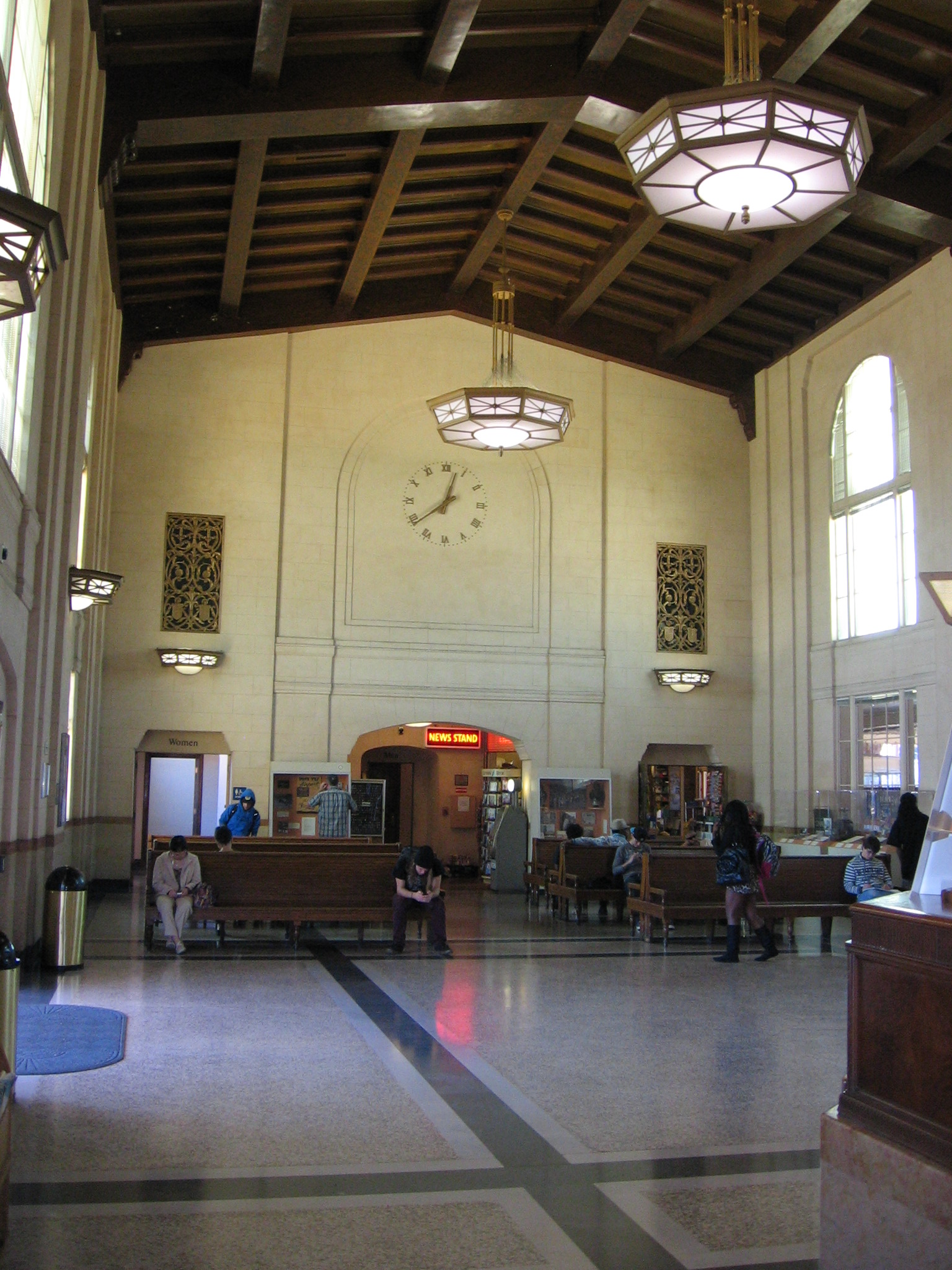
The main waiting room

The depot is in the Italian Renaissance Revival style, with a three-story central section flanked by two-story wings. The building, a compilation of rectangular sections, is 390 feet (118 m) long and 40 feet to 78 feet (12 to 24 m) wide. The central section, which contains the passenger waiting room, measures 40 by 80 feet (12 by 25 m) and is 33 feet (10 m) high. The high center pavilion housing the waiting room is constructed of steel columns and trusses. The side wings are framed with wood. The exterior walls are clad with tapestry brick or varied colors and arranged in an English bond pattern. The depot is in an industrial area formerly dominated by warehouses and related commercial businesses. Several vernacular sheds, a water tower, butterfly passenger sheds and the nearby Alameda underpass are all contributing buildings and structures within the railroad station.

The building was designed by Southern Pacific architect, John H. Christie, who had worked on the Southern Pacific remodeling of the Fresno depot in 1915 and later, in 1939, worked on Union Station in Los Angeles. This depot is one of only four Italian Renaissance Revival style depots in California, and the largest surviving depot of the San Francisco–San Jose line. The only other large depots built in California during the 1930s were the Los Angeles Union Passenger Terminal and Stockton Cabral station.

== History ==
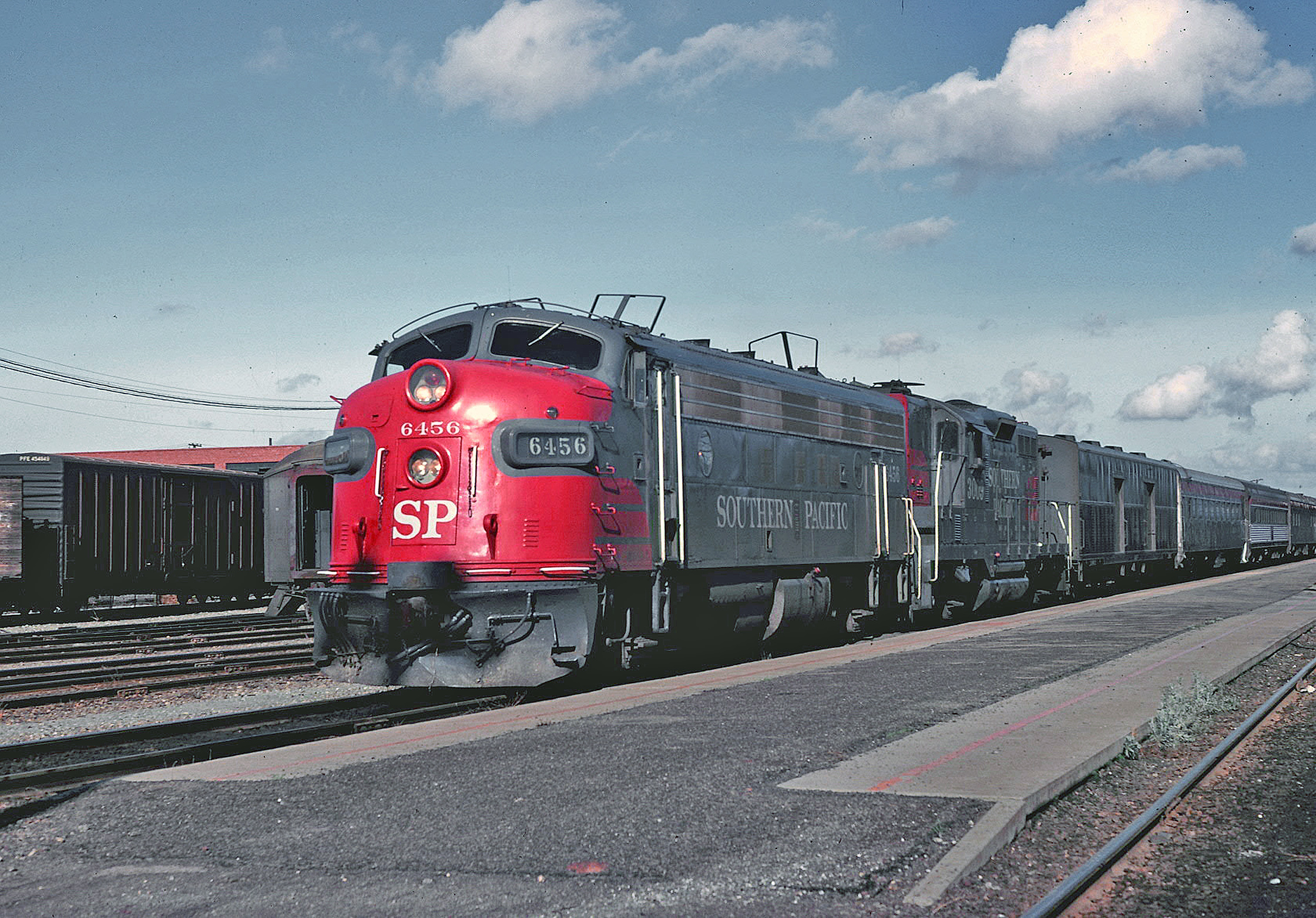
The Coast Daylight at San Jose in 1970

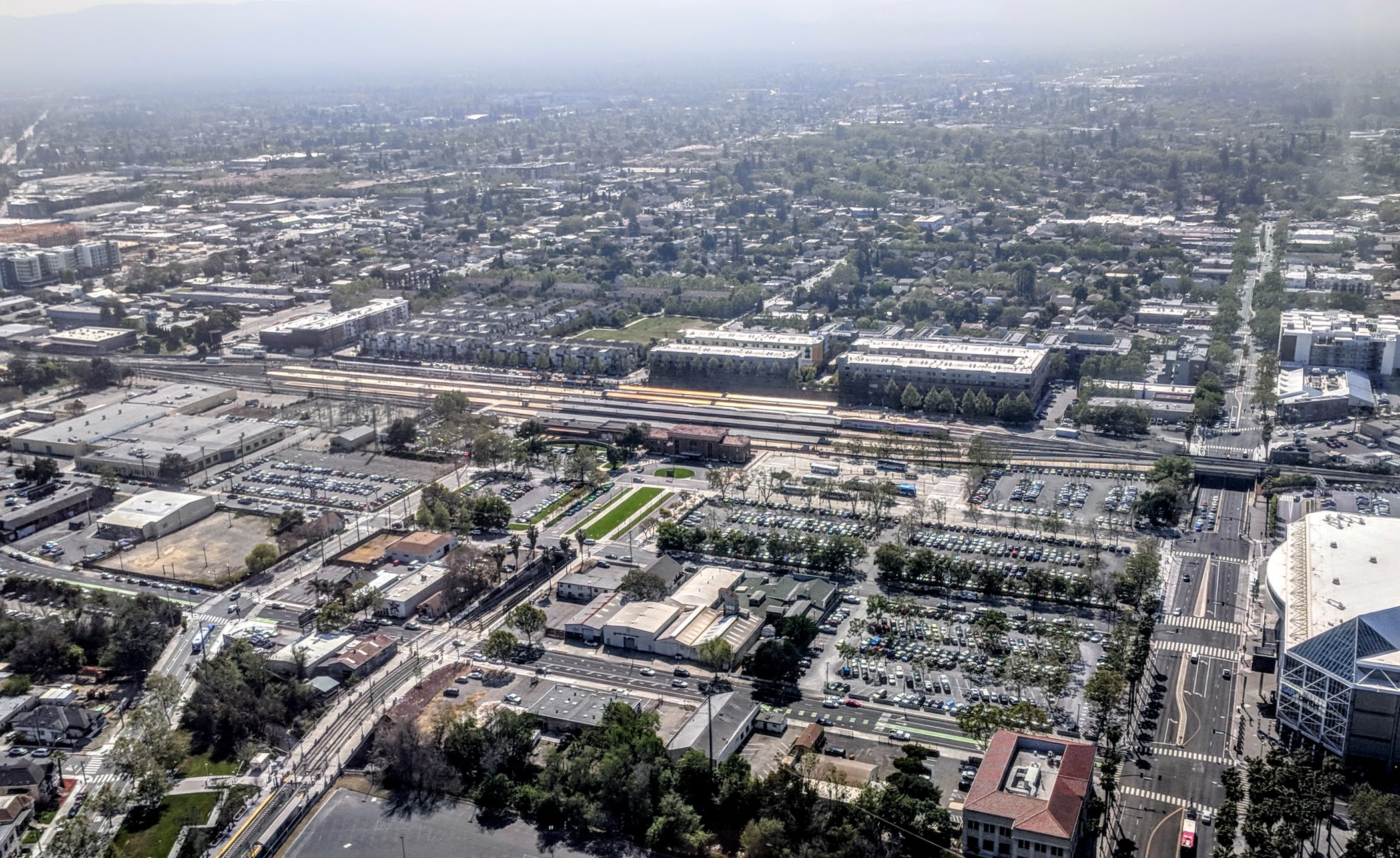
Aerial view of Diridon station and vicinity in 2018

A rail station at this location was established in 1878, when the narrow-gauge South Pacific Coast Railroad opened their San Jose Depot on the site. When Southern Pacific gained control of the railroad in 1887, the station was folded into the system and referred to as the West San Jose Depot. Plans to consolidate the railroad's operations here were rumored prior to the takeover.

The current station opened in December 1935 as Cahill Depot. The opening of the depot was the culmination of a 30-year effort to relocate 4.5 miles (7.2 km) of the Coast Line of the Southern Pacific Railroad away from the heavy traffic of the downtown area around the Market Street Depot, formerly located at Market and Bassett Streets, at the northern edge of Downtown near St. James Park. The new depot replaced the Fourth Street line's station for passengers, though freight operations persisted for some time at the old facility.

The Cahill Depot was a stop for several Southern Pacific passenger trains, including the famous San Francisco–Los Angeles train, the Coast Daylight. Other "named" trains that used the station were the all first-class Lark (a San Francisco-Los Angeles night train), seasonal Suntan Special, and the Del Monte. It was also a major station on the Peninsula Commute, the SP's commuter service between San Jose and San Francisco.

Amtrak took over long-distance passenger train service in 1971. Fourteen years later, Caltrans took over the Peninsula Commute and renamed it Caltrain.

Restoration of the station was finished in 1994, when the station was renamed Diridon Station after former Santa Clara County Supervisor Rod Diridon.

In 1996, Santa Clara County voters approved a half cent sales tax to fund the 1996 Measure B Transportation Improvement Project. Part of this project was the construction of the Vasona Light Rail extension which included a VTA light rail platform at the Diridon train depot. The official opening date for this light rail extension was October 1, 2005, however, revenue service at the San Fernando and Diridon Stations began on July 29, 2005 to accommodate attendees of the inaugural San Jose Grand Prix race.

The passenger platform was featured in the opening scene of Alfred Hitchcock's Marnie (1964) representing the Hartford, Connecticut, train station.

== Services ==
San Jose Diridon station is the southern anchor of Caltrain service. It is the southern terminal for limited and express service, while some local service terminates further south at Tamien station. It is the northern terminus of South County Connector diesel services, which have timed cross-platform transfers with electric trains. The station is also the southern terminus for two regional intercity/commuter services: the Altamont Corridor Express the Amtrak Capitol Corridor. It is an intermediate stop for the Amtrak long-distance Coast Starlight. Diridon station is served by the Green Line of the VTA light rail system.

A bus plaza on the north side of the station serves local and regional bus carriers:

- VTA Bus: 22, 64A, 64B, 68, Rapid 500, Rapid 522, Rapid 568, SCVMC Shuttle
- Amtrak Thruway: 6, 17, 21
- Greyhound
- Santa Cruz METRO: Highway 17 Express
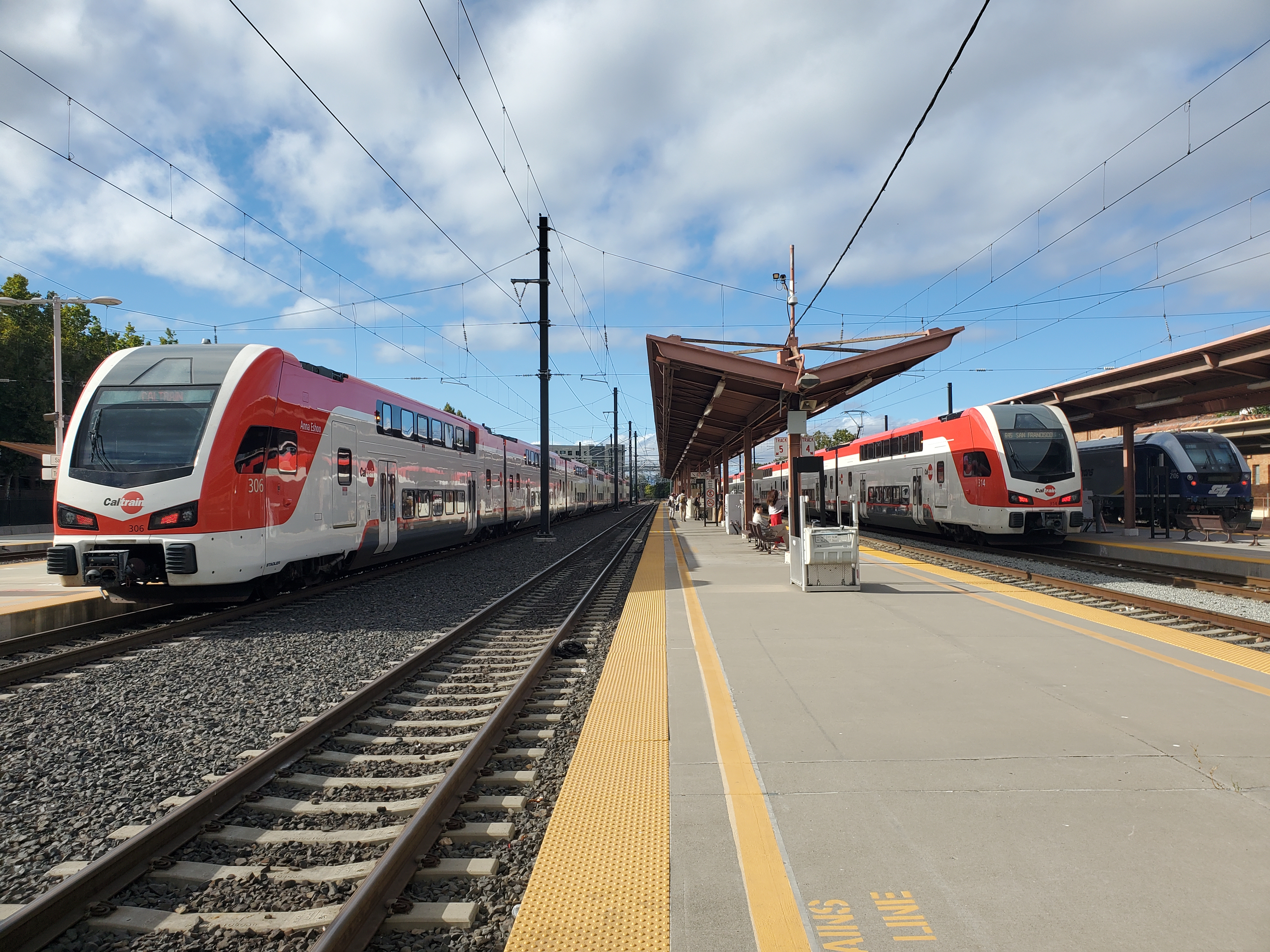
Caltrain electric trains

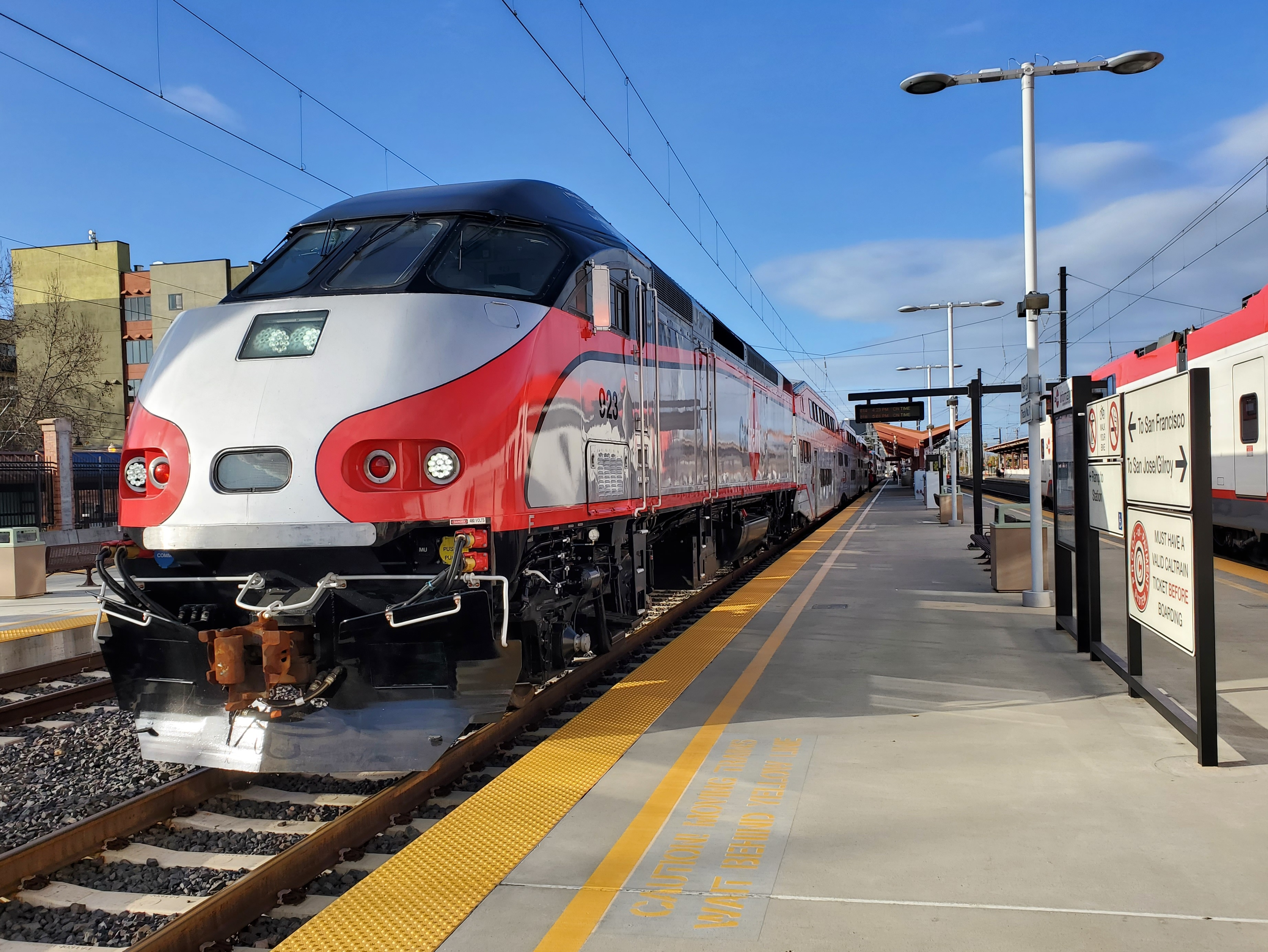
Caltrain South County Connector train

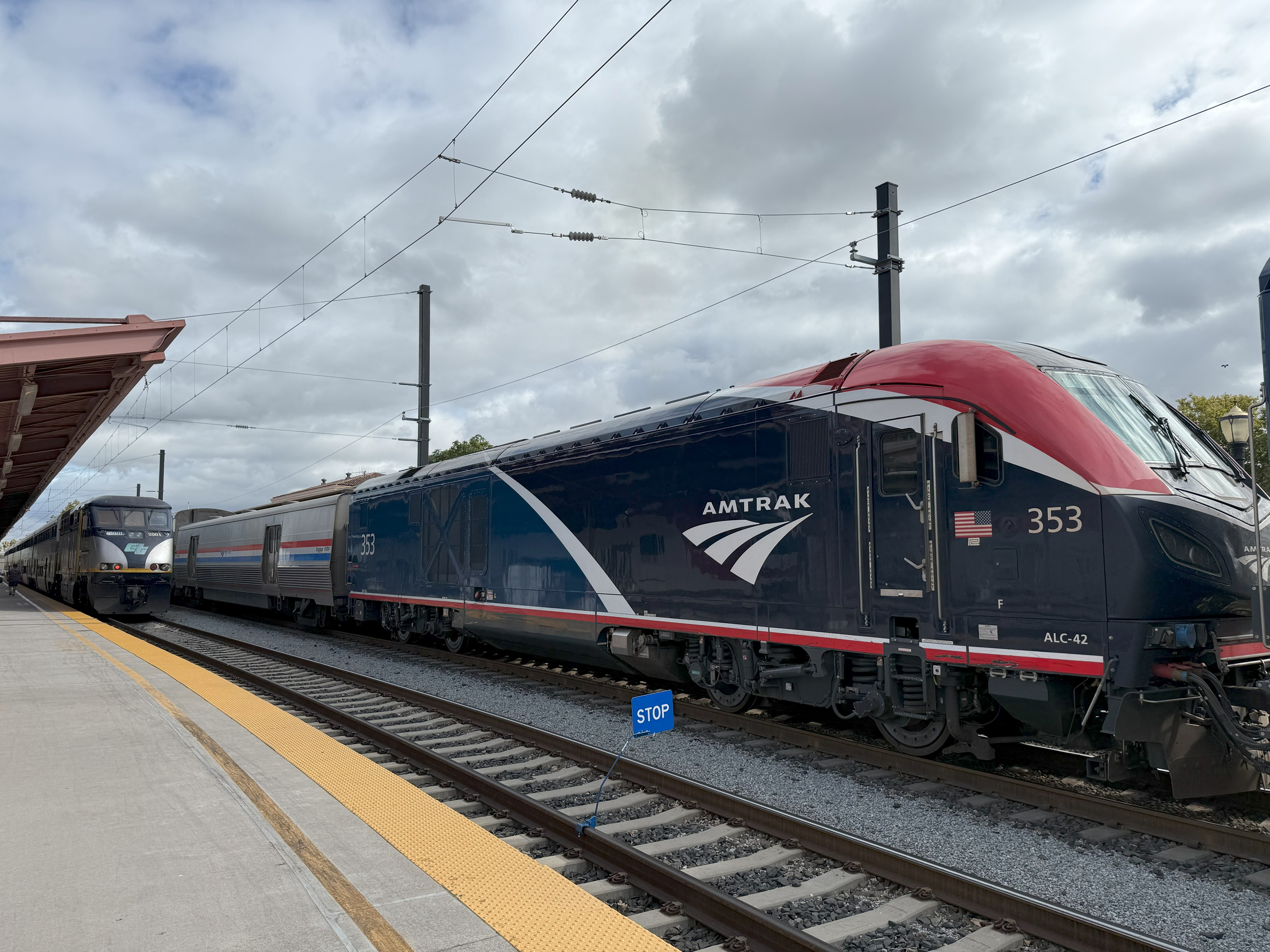
Amtrak Capitol Corridor and Coast Starlight trains

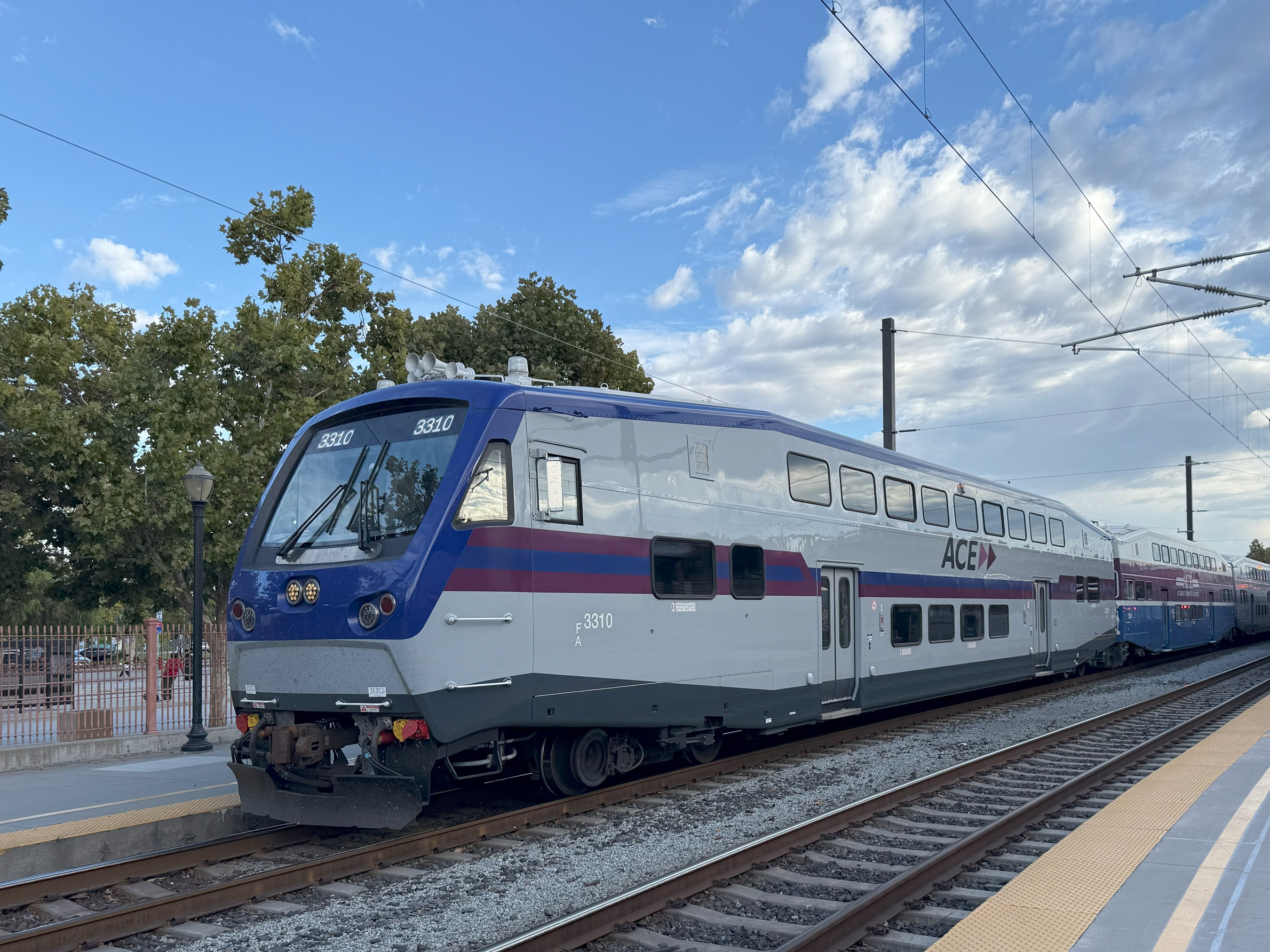
ACE train

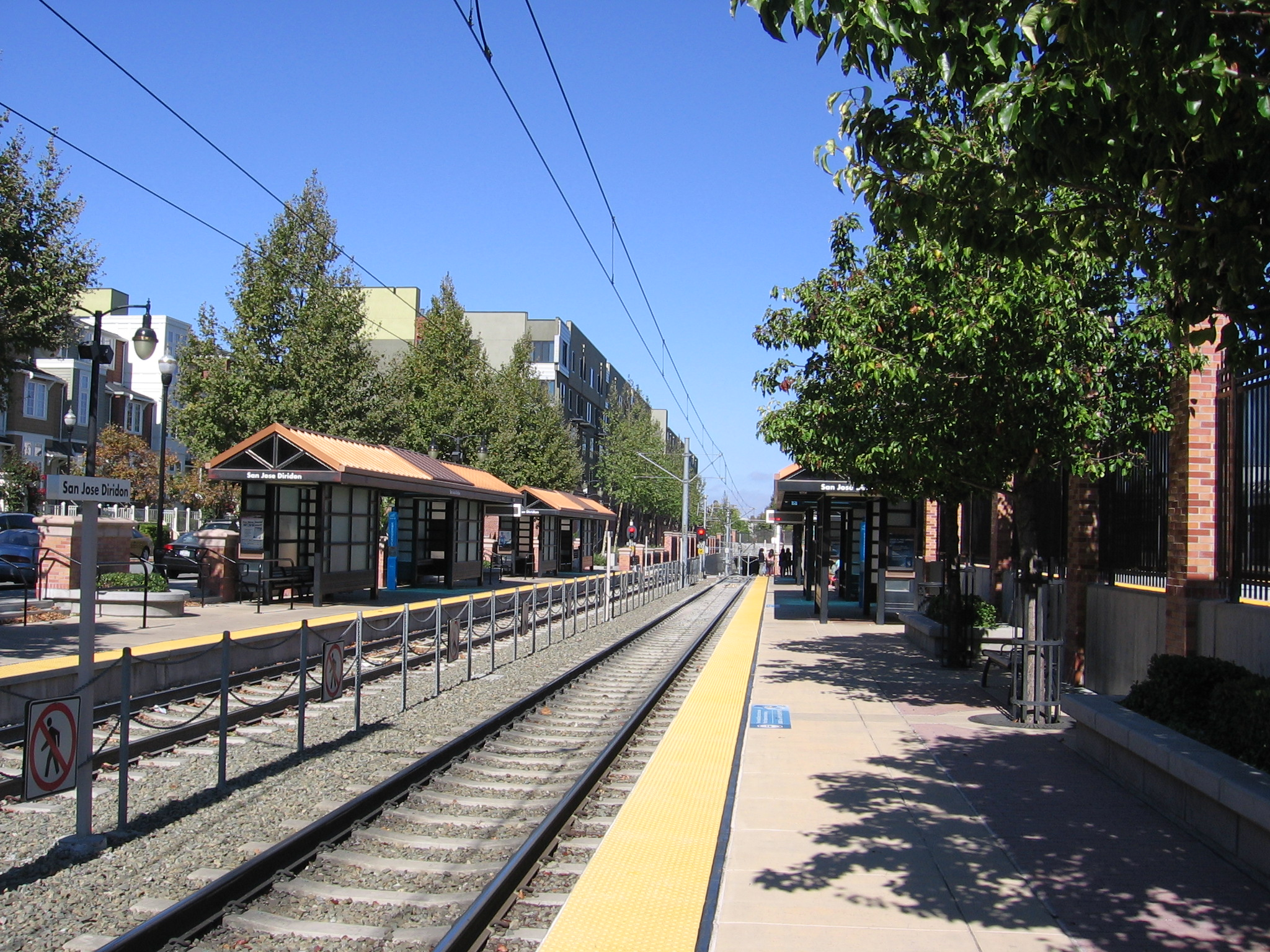
VTA light rail platforms

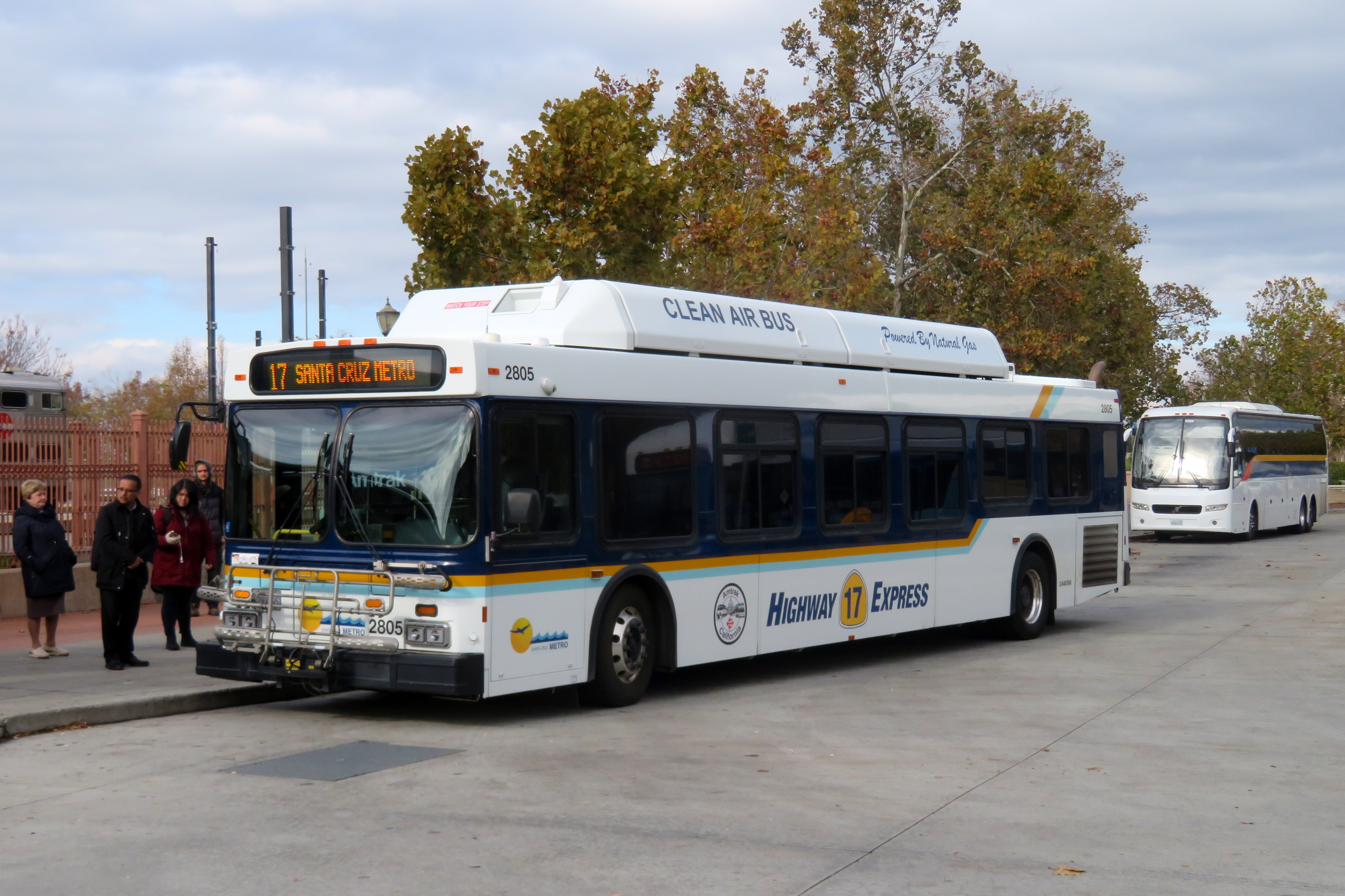
Highway 17 Express bus

=== Future ===
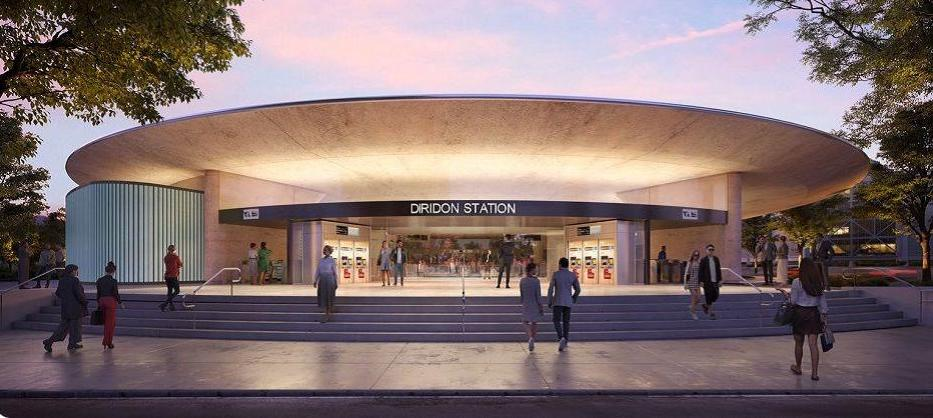
Rendering of the future Diridon BART Station entrance

The San Jose Diridon station is planned as a future stop on the California High-Speed Rail line and Phase II of VTA's Silicon Valley BART extension in Santa Clara County. Since late 2019, CHSRA, VTA, Caltrain, and City of San Jose have jointly held "Diridon Integrated Station Concept Plan" public workshops to determine how to best rebuild the Diridon station in order to facilitate integration of future and existing services.

The BART station will be called Diridon and planned to open in 2036. It will be a subway station adjacent to the train station and Santa Clara Street. It will be located between the Santa Clara and Downtown San José BART stations with direct service to Santa Clara, San Francisco/Daly City (via the East Bay), and Richmond.
