= Great Mall =

Great Mall may refer to:

- Great Mall of the Bay Area in Milpitas, California, USA
  - Great Mall station, a Santa Clara Valley light rail station
- The Great Mall of the Great Plains in Olathe, Kansas, USA
- Great Mall of Las Vegas, an unbuilt project in Las Vegas, Nevada, USA
- Great Mall of China, colloquial name for Golden Resources Mall in Beijing, China

== See also ==
- All pages with titles containing "Great" and "Mall"
- Great (disambiguation)
- Mall (disambiguation)
- Great Northern Mall (disambiguation)
