= Hostetter station =

VTA light rail station in San Jose, California

Hostetter
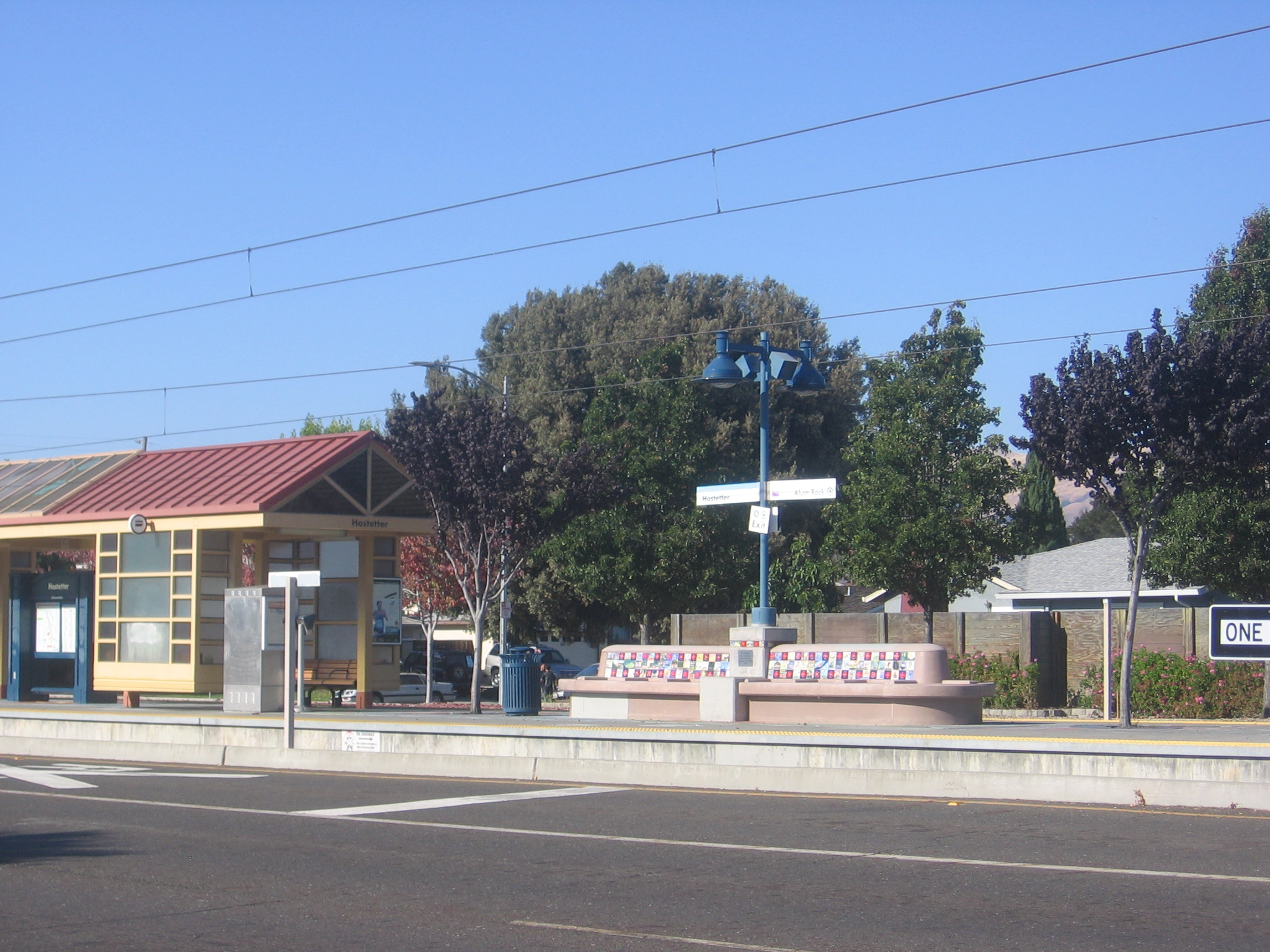
- Hostetter station in 2012

General information
- Location: Capitol Avenue and Hostetter Road; San Jose, California
- Coordinates: 37°23′43″N 121°52′12″W
- Owner: Santa Clara Valley Transportation Authority
- Line: Tasman East/Capitol
- Platforms: 1 island platform
- Tracks: 2
- Connections: VTA Bus: 70

Construction
- Structure type: At-grade
- Parking: 100 spaces
- Cycle facilities: Racks and lockers
- Accessible: Yes

History
- Opened: June 24, 2004; 22 years ago

Services
Preceding station	VTA	Following station
Cropley toward Mountain View	Orange Line	Berryessa toward Alum Rock
Location

Hostetter station is a light rail station located in the median of North Capitol Avenue, just south of Hostetter Road in San Jose, California. It is operated by the Santa Clara Valley Transportation Authority (VTA) and is served by the Orange Line.

The station, built as part of the Tasman East/Capitol extension from I-880/Milpitas station (now Alder station) to Alum Rock Transit Center, was originally intended as the terminus of phase two of the Tasman East project. However, phase two of the Tasman East extension and the Capitol extension were eventually opened on the same date on June 24, 2004.
