= Cropley station =

VTA light rail station in San Jose, California

Cropley
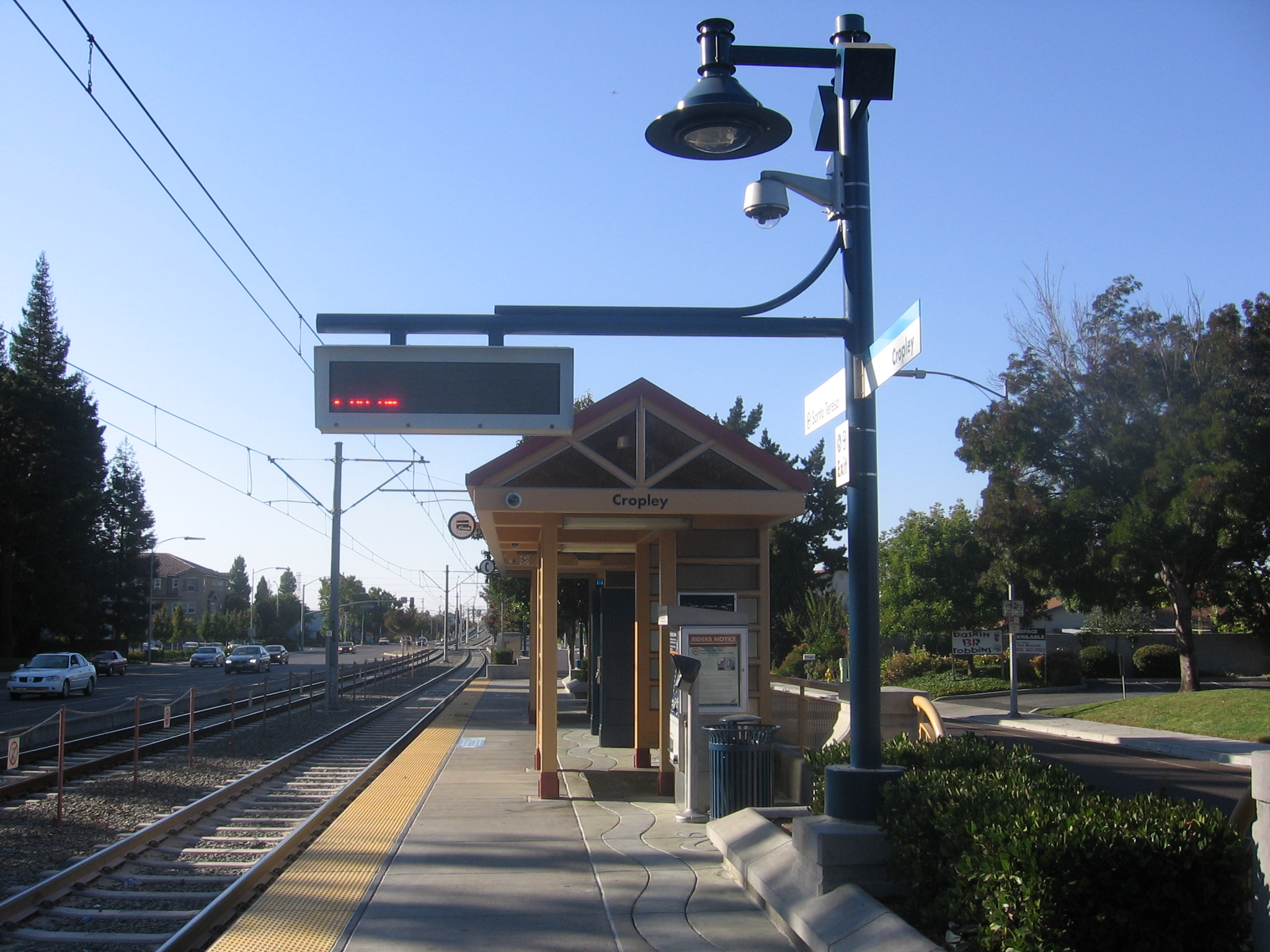
- Cropley station platform in 2012

General information
- Location: Capitol Avenue and Cropley Avenue; San Jose, California
- Coordinates: 37°24′12″N 121°52′55″W
- Owner: Santa Clara Valley Transportation Authority
- Line: Tasman East/Capitol
- Platforms: 2 side platforms
- Tracks: 2

Construction
- Structure type: At-grade
- Accessible: Yes

History
- Opened: June 24, 2004; 22 years ago

Services
Preceding station	VTA	Following station
Milpitas toward Mountain View	Orange Line	Hostetter toward Alum Rock
Location

Cropley station is a light rail station operated by Santa Clara Valley Transportation Authority (VTA), located in the median of North Capitol Avenue near Cropley Avenue in San Jose, California. This station is served by VTA's Orange Line.

The station was opened on June 24, 2004, as part of the second phase of VTA's Tasman East light rail extension.
