= Cisco Way station =

VTA light rail station in San Jose, California

Cisco Way
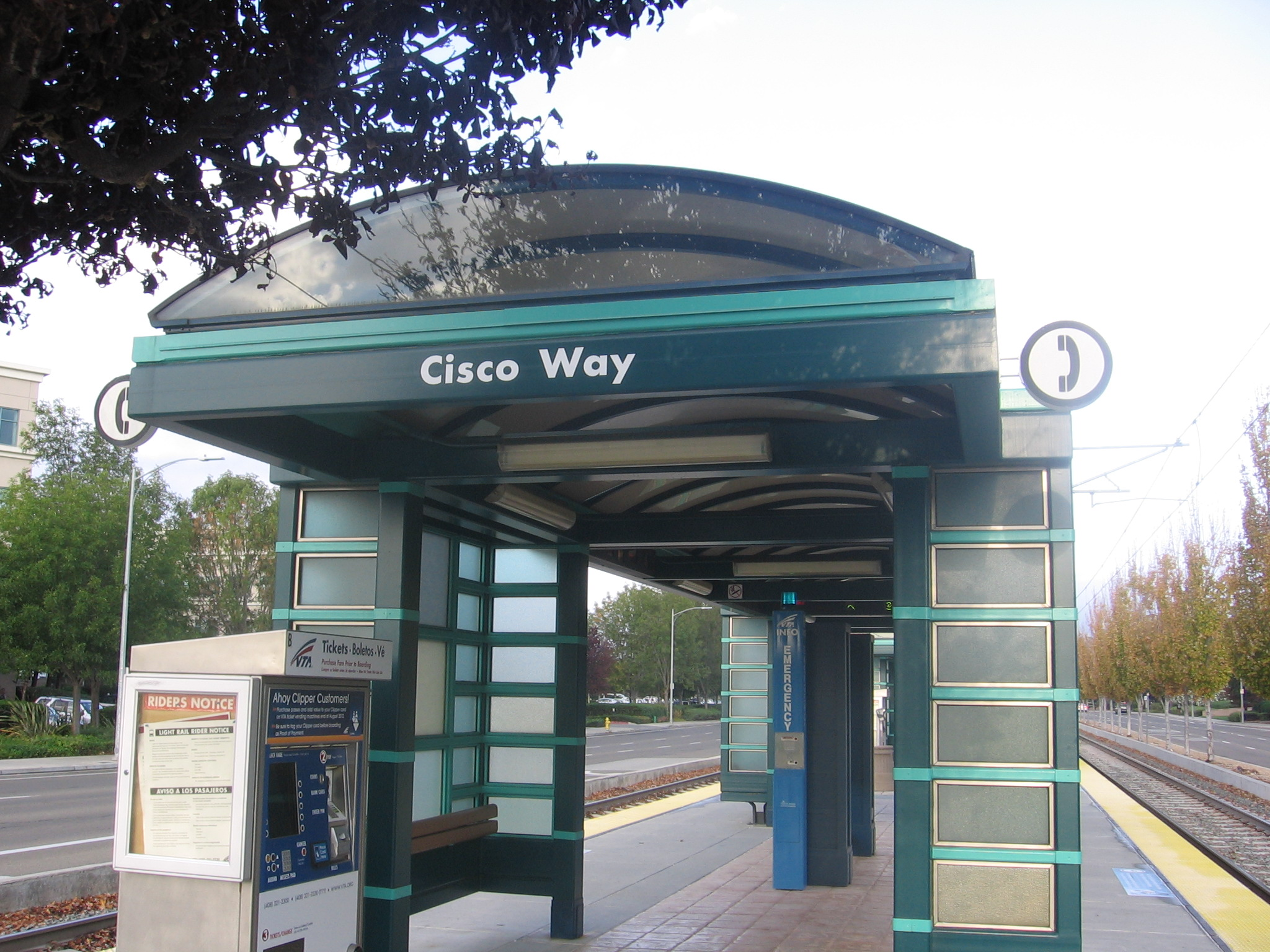
- Cisco Way station platform, 2012

General information
- Location: Cisco Way and Tasman Drive; San Jose, California
- Coordinates: 37°24′45″N 121°55′44″W
- Owner: Santa Clara Valley Transportation Authority
- Platforms: 1 island platform
- Tracks: 2
- Connections: ACE Shuttle: Purple

Construction
- Structure type: At-grade
- Accessible: Yes

History
- Opened: May 17, 2001; 25 years ago

Services
| Preceding station | VTA | Following station |
|---|---|---|
| Baypointe toward Mountain View | Orange Line | Alder toward Alum Rock |
Location

Cisco Way station is a light rail station operated by Santa Clara Valley Transportation Authority (VTA). The station is located in the median of Tasman Drive just west of Cisco Way in northern San Jose, California. It is located near the headquarters of Cisco Systems, which Cisco Way was named after. This station is served by the Orange Line of the VTA light rail system.

The station was opened on May 17, 2001, as part of the first phase of VTA's Tasman East light rail extension.
