= Alder station =

VTA light rail station in Milpitas, California

Alder
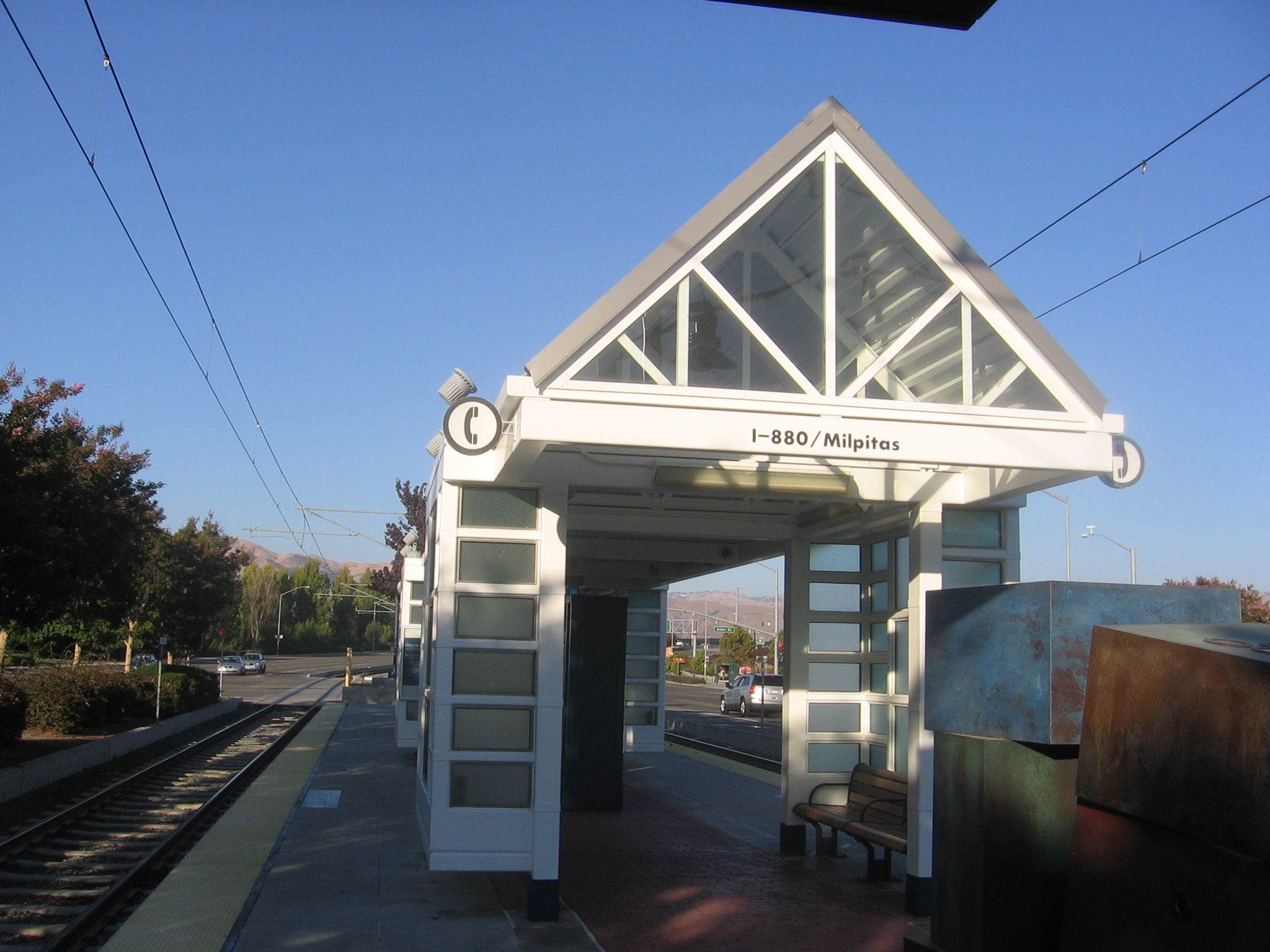
- Alder station platform

General information
- Location: Tasman Drive and Alder Drive; Milpitas, California
- Coordinates: 37°24′48″N 121°55′03″W
- Owner: Santa Clara Valley Transportation Authority
- Line: Tasman East
- Platforms: 1 island platform
- Tracks: 2
- Connections: VTA Bus: 47; ACE Shuttle: Purple

Construction
- Structure type: At-grade
- Parking: 275 spaces
- Cycle facilities: Racks and lockers
- Accessible: Yes

History
- Opened: May 17, 2001; 25 years ago
- Former names: I-880/Milpitas

Services
Preceding station	VTA	Following station
Cisco Way toward Mountain View	Orange Line	Great Mall toward Alum Rock
Location

Alder station (formerly known as I-880/Milpitas) is a light rail station operated by Santa Clara Valley Transportation Authority (VTA). Located near the intersection of Tasman Drive and Alder Drive in Milpitas, California, this station is served by the Orange Line of the VTA light rail system. The Interstate 880/Tasman Drive interchange is to the east of the station.

The station was opened on May 17, 2001, as part of VTA's Tasman East light rail extension.

The station has a 275 space park and ride lot situated diagonally opposite from the platform. The entrance to the parking lot has a large public art installation, a clocktower called "Gateway to the City of Milpitas."

== History ==
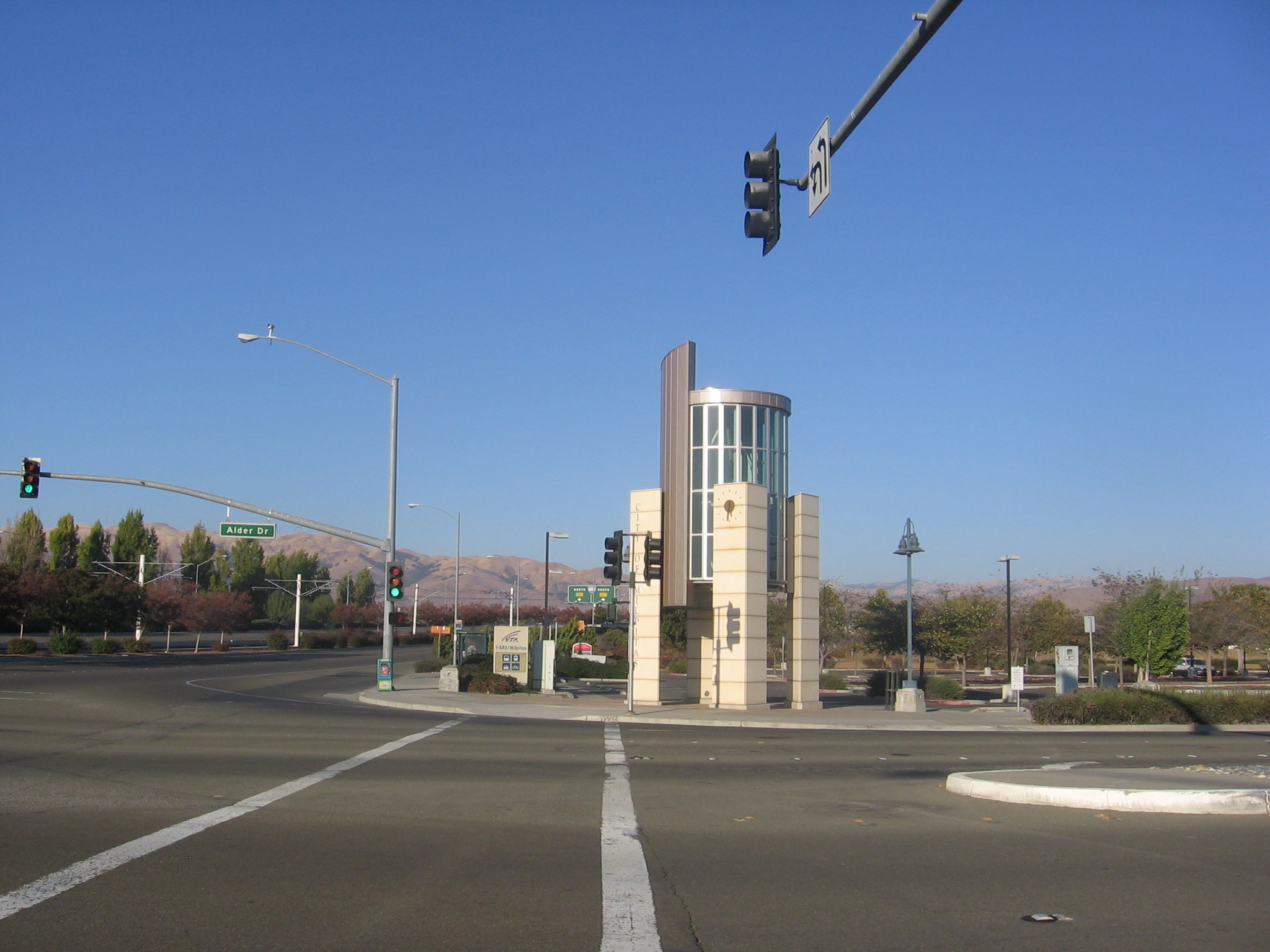
Clocktower at the entrance to the station's park and ride lot

Alder originally served as the eastern terminus of the first phase of the Tasman East light rail extension on May 17, 2001, and so was originally served by trains operating directly from Mountain View.

When the station first opened, it served the southern terminus of AC Transit's 217 bus, the only such service that runs into Santa Clara County. Since then, the second phase of the Tasman East extension altered the station's service patterns, and the 217 bus now terminates at the Milpitas Transit Center.

Since 2017, VTA's plans for new routes in support of the Silicon Valley BART extension included renaming this station "Alder" after its cross-street Alder Drive. The station was renamed to Alder in 2021.

== Service ==
=== Location ===
Alder station is located in the median of Tasman Drive just west of Alder Drive near Interstate 880 in Milpitas, California.
