= Berryessa Station =

Berryessa Station may refer to:

- Berryessa/North San Jose station, a BART heavy rail station in California
- Berryessa station (VTA), a VTA light rail station in California
