= Eastridge Transit Center =

Bus station in San Jose, California, US

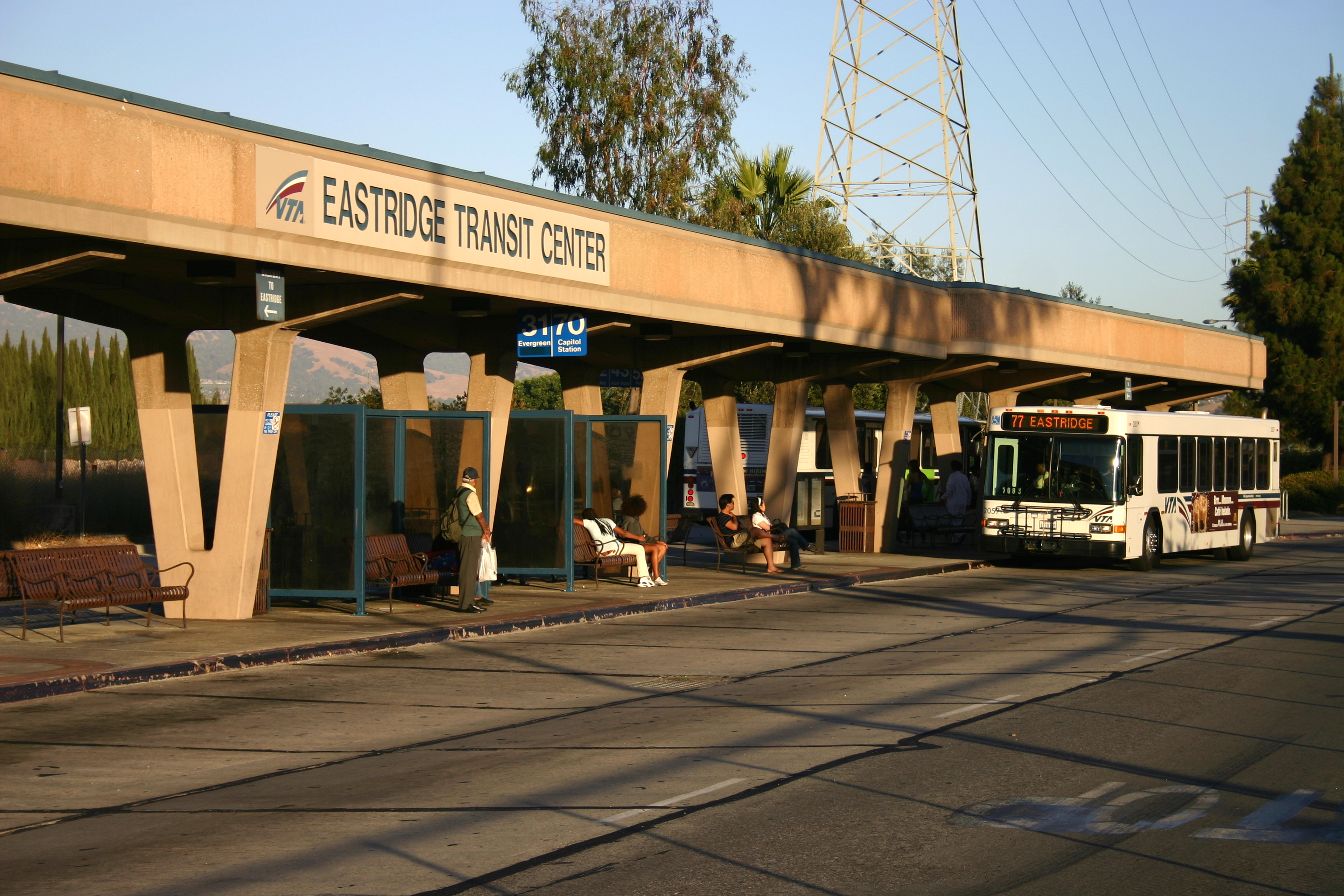
- Eastridge Transit Center, July 2008

General information
- Location: Capitol Expressway; San Jose, California
- Coordinates: 37°19′41″N 121°48′39″W
- Bus routes: VTA Bus: 22, 26, 31, 39, 70, 71, 77, Express 103, Rapid 522; Flixbus

Construction
- Accessible: Yes

Other information
- Website: Eastridge Transit Center

History
- Opening: 2029 (light rail)
- Rebuilt: 2015

Future service
Preceding station	VTA	Following station
Story toward Mountain View	Orange Line	Terminus
Location

The Eastridge Transit Center is a Santa Clara Valley Transportation Authority (VTA) bus terminal located at the Eastridge Mall in the Evergreen District of San Jose, California. The station is located alongside Capitol Expressway near Tully Road.

== Bus routes ==
The following bus routes serve Eastridge:

- VTA Bus:
  - 22 - Eastridge to the Palo Alto Transit Center via King Rd., Downtown San Jose, and El Camino Real
  - 26 - Eastridge to Westgate Center (daily) and West Valley College (select weekday trips)
  - 31 - Eastridge to Evergreen Valley College
  - 39 - Eastridge to The Villages
  - 70 - VTA light rail Capitol station to Berryessa BART (all trips) and Milpitas BART (select trips) via Capitol Expressway and Jackson Ave.
  - 71 - Eastridge to Milpitas BART via White Rd. and Piedmont Rd.
  - 77 - Eastridge to Milpitas BART via King Rd., Berryessa BART, and Lundy Ave.
  - Express 103 - Eastridge to Stanford Research Park
  - Rapid 522 - Eastridge to the Palo Alto Transit Center via Capitol Expressway, Downtown San Jose, and El Camino Real
- Flixbus (intercity bus service)

== Light rail extension ==
The VTA light rail Orange Line is planned to be extended to Eastridge from its current terminus at the Alum Rock Transit Center, as part of the Eastridge to BART Regional Connector Project. This new extension would offer rail connection to the Milpitas Transit Center and the Mountain View Transit Center, providing access to Bay Area Rapid Transit (BART) and Caltrain. A groundbreaking was held on June 8, 2024. Construction is expected to be completed in 2028 with revenue service beginning in 2029.
