= Bus Route 104 =

Bus Route 104 may refer to:

- Route 104 (MTA Maryland), a bus route in Baltimore, operating to Johns Hopkins Hospital, part of the Route 13 bus route
- SEPTA Route 104, Philadelphia
- VTA Express Bus Route 104 in Santa Clara, California. See Penitencia Creek (VTA).
- Route 104 between Pak Tin and Kennedy Town in Hong Kong. See List of bus routes in Hong Kong.

== See also ==
- List of highways numbered 104
