= Story station =

Light rail station, San Jose, California

Story
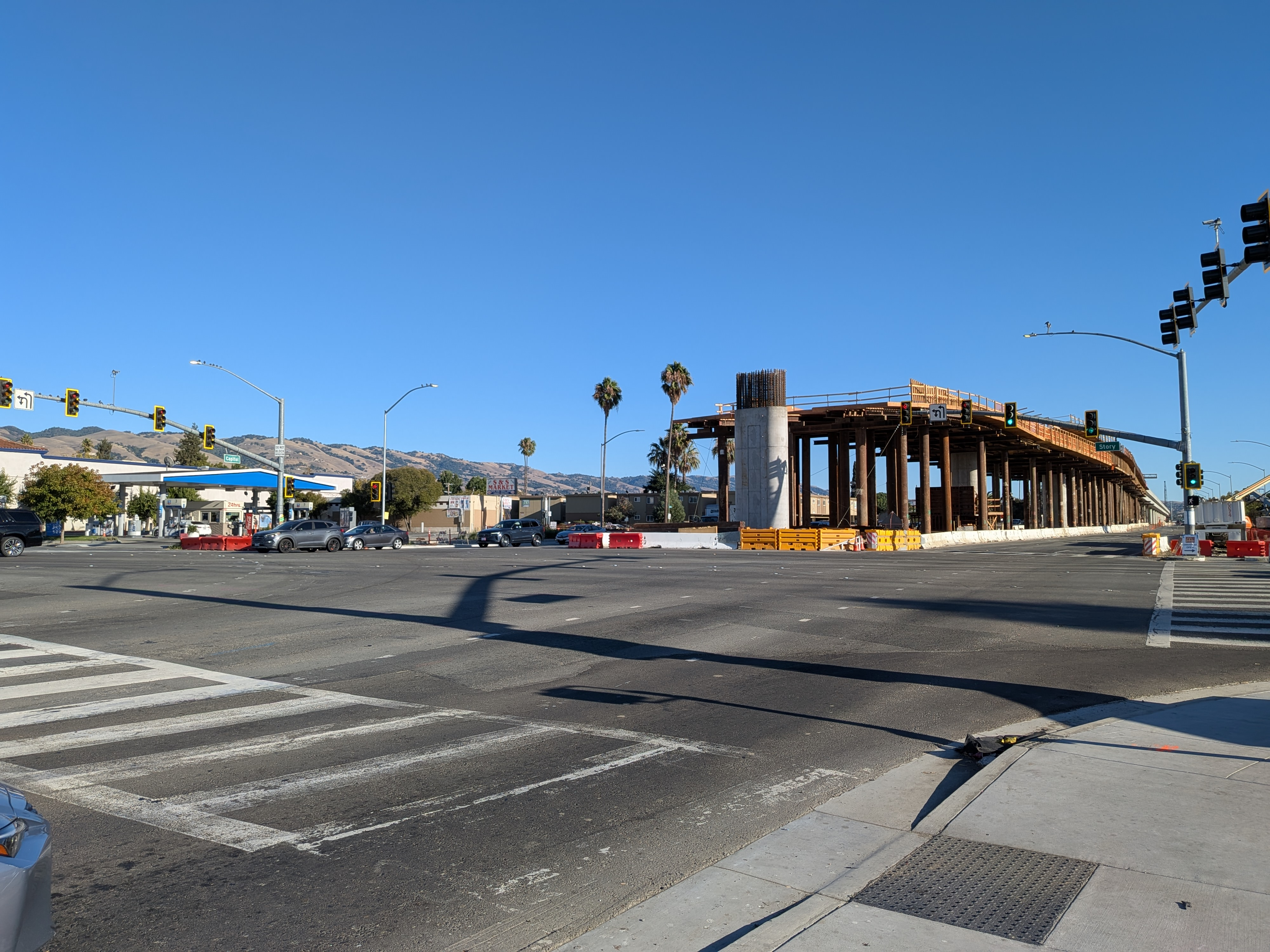
- Station under construction, October 2025

General information
- Location: Capitol Expressway; San Jose, California
- Coordinates: 37°21′03″N 121°49′37″W
- Owner: Santa Clara Valley Transportation Authority
- Line: Capitol Expressway
- Tracks: 2

Construction
- Structure type: Elevated
- Accessible: Yes

History
- Opening: 2029; 3 years' time

Future service
Preceding station	VTA	Following station
Alum Rock toward Mountain View	Orange Line	Eastridge Transit Center Terminus
Location

Story station is a planned VTA light rail station in San Jose, California. It is proposed as an elevated station located on Capitol Expressway at Story Road.

The VTA light rail Orange Line is planned to be extended to the Eastridge Transit Center from its current terminus at the Alum Rock Transit Center, with Story station being the intermediate stop. This is part of the Eastridge to BART Regional Connector Project. The extension would offer rail connection to the Milpitas Transit Center and the Mountain View Transit Center, providing access to Bay Area Rapid Transit (BART) and Caltrain. After utility relocation for the project is complete in September 2022, construction would commence in fall 2023 and revenue service is expected to begin in 2029.
