= Great Mall of the Bay Area =

Shopping mall in Santa Clara County, California, U.S.

- Great Eats food court, now Dining Pavilion (September 2016)
- Location: Milpitas, California, U.S.
- Coordinates: 37.415773°N 121.898012°W
- Address: 447 Great Mall Drive, 95035
- Opened: September 22, 1994; 32 years ago
- Renovated: 2000–2001 (expansion); 2004–2005 (partially completed); 2016–2018
- Developer: Ford Motor Land Development Corporation; Petrie Dierman Kughn
- Manager: Simon Premium Outlets; The Mills: A Simon Company
- Owner: Simon Property Group
- Num. of stores: approx. 225 (at peak; 195+ as of November 2026)
- Num. of anchor tenants: 10 (at peak)
- Floor area: 1,366,123 square feet (126,917.0 m^{2})
- Floors: 1
- Parking: Surface parking lot
- Public transit: Great Mall; Milpitas
- Website: www.simon.com/mall/great-mall
- Building details
- Entrance 2 (November 2024)

General information
- Construction started: July 5, 1993; 33 years ago
- Completed: 1998 (Phase I); 2001 (Phase II / expansion)

Design and construction
- Main contractor: Real Estate Development Services, LLC

Renovating team
- Architect: Field Paoli (2016–2018)
- Renovating firm: Swerdlow Real Estate Group (2000–2001); The Mills Corporation (2004–2005); Simon Property Group (2016–2018)
- Main contractor: Graycor (2016–2018)

Great Mall of the Bay Area (often simply called Great Mall) is a super-regional shopping mall in Milpitas, California, United States, developed by Ford Motor Land Development and Petrie Dierman Kughn in 1994. It was acquired by the Mills Corporation in 2003, which was acquired by Simon Property Group in April 2007. The outlet mall contains approximately 1.4 million square feet (130,000 m^{2}) of gross leasable area (GLA).

The mall's anchor stores are Century Theatres by Cinemark, Kohl's, Dick's Sporting Goods, Home Interiors Furniture, Q, Marshalls, Burlington, Dave & Buster's and the Legoland Discovery Center. The mall formerly had Saks Off 5th, Vans Skatepark, Sears Outlet, and Neiman Marcus Last Call. Prior to 1983, the building that houses Great Mall was formerly home to the San Jose Assembly Plant.

== Overview ==
Based on gross leasable area, the Great Mall of the Bay Area is the largest outlet mall and the 8th largest mall in California. It was once the largest mall in Northern California, but has been surpassed by Westfield Valley Fair.

The Great Mall of the Bay Area sits at the intersection of Great Mall Parkway (which becomes Capitol Avenue when it crosses Montague Expressway) and Montague Expressway. The Parc Metropolitan apartments lie to the north of the mall. A few inns are also located at the south entrance of the mall.

The Great Mall of the Bay Area is close to the Santa Clara Valley Transportation Authority's Great Mall station. Many VTA bus routes and also one by AC Transit stop at this transit center. The light rail station is elevated in the median of Great Mall Parkway. Bay Area Rapid Transit (BART) opened service to Milpitas station on June 13, 2020, providing access to the Great Mall and connections with VTA and AC Transit.

== History ==
=== Background ===
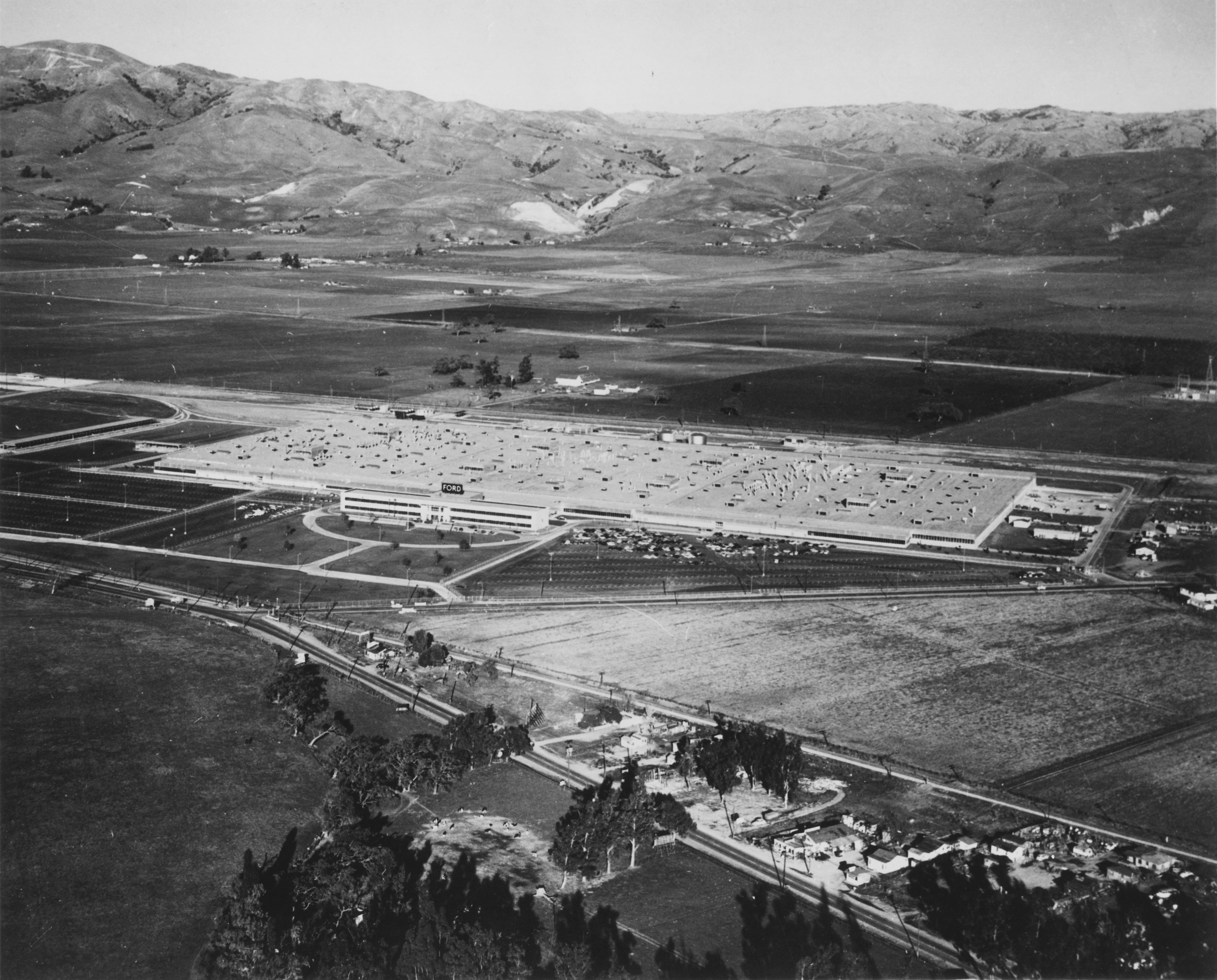
Aerial view of the San Jose Assembly Plant in 1955

The Ford Motor Company's San Jose Assembly Plant was built in 1955 to replace their Richmond plant. It was one of only three locations where Ford manufactured the Mustang; the other sites were Dearborn Assembly and Edison Assembly. Ford also manufactured the Escort, F-Series, Pinto, Fairlane, and Torino models at the San Jose plant, alongside Mercury products. The facility closed down in 1983 in part due to increasing competition with Japanese auto manufacturers.

=== 1983–2002: Development and opening ===
After the factory ceased operations in 1983, the rise of Silicon Valley brought new job opportunities to Northern California except for manufacturing. Ford Motor Land Development Corporation of Dearborn, Michigan formed a joint venture with retail developer Petrie Dierman Kughn of McLean, Virginia, and had the adaptive reuse idea of converting the former manufacturing facility into a super-regional shopping mall with outlet stores. The California Environmental Quality Act (CEQA) state review period for the project's Environmental Impact Report concluded on February 5, 1993, clearing the way for municipal approvals and site work.

Construction on Great Mall of the Bay Area began on July 5, 1993, with the former assembly plant being gutted. Under the City of Milpitas as lead agency, a Draft Environmental Impact Report (EIR) was processed through December 23, 1993. Planners divided the 110-acre (45 ha) property into two distinct phases; the $125 million first phase of the mall had its grand opening on September 22, 1994, with Saks Fifth Avenue Outlet (later Saks Off 5th), Marshalls, Oshman's SuperSports USA, Old Navy (later Old Navy Outlet), the Warner Bros. Studio Store, and Media Play.

==== Design and architecture ====
Great Mall of the Bay Area first opened in a single-story "racetrack"-like layout, featuring five entrances with themes of modes of transportation that matched with the courts within; the Great Autos court was themed after automobiles, and was filled with 1950s car themes, such as vintage gas pumps and Coca-Cola machines, with a 1957 Ford Skyliner that sat on a rotating platform as the center piece. The other courts were Great Railroads, Great Ships, Great Planes, and the Great Eats food court, each having their own unique environments.

The Hollywood, Florida-based Swerdlow Real Estate Group acquired Great Mall on April 1, 1998, taking over leasing, development, and property management. Swerdlow wanted to fill the mall with entertainment venues that it originally lacked, completing $60 million Phase II expansion in between 2000 and 2001, with the opening of a 59,000 to 60,000 sq ft (5,500 to 5,600 m^{2}) Vans Skatepark on June 22–23, 2000, and Century 20 Great Mall Theatres, a 20-screen cinema with stadium seating. The redevelopment also included "re-tenanting" the complex due to its proximity to Silicon Valley.

The WB Studio Store closed permanently by the time of the expansion due to the AOL-Time Warner merger. The expansion was completed in the fall of 2002, adding Dave & Buster's and Burlington Coat Factory. An Xbox Lounge would open inside the Vans Skatepark on November 23, 2002.

=== 2003–2014: Continued expansions ===
Dave & Buster's signage (June 2012)

On August 5, 2003, The Mills Corporation of Arlington, Virginia purchased the mall for $265.5 million, and announced that it would be renovated and rebranded into a Landmark Mills property, hoping to significantly boost annual sales. By the time of the acquisition, Great Mall had 1.3 million square feet (120,000 m^{2}) and was 86.4% occupied with over 200 stores, excluding an additional 60,000 square feet (5,600 m^{2}) of expansion space scheduled to become leasable in 2004, featuring Polo Jeans Factory Store, St. John Knits Outlet, and BCBG Max Azria Outlet. 18 million shoppers visited the mall annually.

The German-based investment firm KanAm Grund Group acquired a 51% joint venture stake in Great Mall in 2004. Mills' renovation was partially completed; the east wing of the mall was heavily gutted to close the Vans Skatepark in 2004, and construct a Kohl's department store, which opened on October 6, 2005, and the mall expanded to feature roughly 225 retailers by February 2007. The rest of the plans that Mills proposed were not completed because by May 2006, they ran into severe financial problems, including an investigation and lawsuit from the Securities and Exchange Commission (SEC) for accounting fraud. Century Theatres was acquired by Texas-based Cinemark Theatres on October 5, 2006, and the mall's movie theater retained the Century branding, though it was renamed Cinemark Century Great Mall 20 XD and ScreenX.

In April 2007, The Mills Corporation and its portfolio, including Great Mall, was acquired by Simon Property Group and Farallon Capital Management for $1.64 billion. The 500th Red Robin Gourmet Burgers & Brews location would open at the mall on August 4, 2014, followed by a Uniqlo concept store on October 31, 2014, as Simon revamped the mall's "Fashion Corridor". This reconfiguration, which lasted throughout October to November, would include the addition of Guess Factory Store, Adidas, O'Neill, and Street Corner, alongside the footprint expansion of Tommy Hilfiger Company Store. To make room for Uniqlo and the expanded Tommy Hilfiger, Simon vacated and combined several smaller inline storefronts in the mall's mid-section.

=== 2016–2021: Renovation by Simon Property Group ===
On April 14, 2016, Simon Property Group announced that Great Mall of the Bay Area would be modernized and renovated to remove aging 1990s flooring and ceiling treatments and replace them with sleek new floor tiles, updated ceiling features, and energy-efficient LED lighting throughout the concourses. In May 2016, Sports Authority announced it would close its location after filing for Chapter 11 bankruptcy. However, its vacancy would be short lived as Dick’s Sporting Goods would open up in Sports Authority’s vacancy. It would open in June 2017.

Renovations were completed in October 2018, with the addition of six new soft-seating lounge areas equipped with free mobile charging stations, an expansion of the public bathrooms, and the installation of a mall-wide integrated audio system. The Great Eats food court was renamed and revamped into the contemporary Dining Pavilion, housing 10 restaurants under modern circular lighting fixtures, while the original main gathering fountain was replaced with two modern infinity water features. Concourses also received bright white industrial ceilings, and digital wayfinding kiosks. The original entry portals were demolished.

In early April 2019, it was reported that Legoland Discovery Center by Merlin Entertainments would take over the mall's former 31,000 sq ft (2,900 m^{2}) Sears Outlet space. Simon Property Group evicted the 900 sq ft (84 m^{2}) Milpitas Historical Society Exhibit effective May 2019 to make way for office space for Legoland. A groundbreaking ceremony for Legoland was held in September 2019, with an expected opening of April 2020. However, due to the COVID-19 pandemic, Great Mall of the Bay Area closed temporarily on March 19, 2020, alongside other Simon properties in the U.S., and the opening for Legoland was postponed. Legoland Discovery Center would debut on May 25, 2021.

=== 2023–present ===
Commemorative plaque explaining the building's history (September 2012)

On February 7, 2023, the Milpitas City Council adopted the Milpitas Metro Specific Plan, expanding the transit-oriented zoning district around the mall and BART station to 510 acres (210 ha). City fire officials cited the mall-as well as anchors Burlington and entertainment venue Game Time—in October and November 2023 over non-functioning fire alarm systems, and as a result, the entire complex was placed under mandatory, 24/7 security firewatch patrols until repairs and permits were resolved.

It was reported in June 2025 that city officials were in early discussions with Simon Property Group to implement the Milpitas Metro Specific Plan across the 99-acre (40 ha) mall parcel and 439 surrounding acres (178 ha). The long-term master plan aims to add 7,000 housing units, and 12,000 potential jobs targeting biosciences, AI, and automotive technology, while gradually integrating residential and office towers alongside the mall. In mid-July 2025, Great Mall welcomed 18 new retailers and eateries, including Skechers, Gregory's Coffee, Saucy Asian, Naans and Curries, Vitamin World, Home Eats Chinese Cuisine, Marc Jacobs, Pottery Barn Outlet, and The Escape Game. More tenants would debut through the remainder of the year, being Altitude Trampoline Park, YesStyle, Psycho Bunny, Onigilly Japanese Kitchen, Chubby Cattle, Duan's Kitchen, Pure Med Spa, Milksha, and San Jose Candy.

Saks Off 5th closed in February 2026 after parent company Saks Global filed for Chapter 11 bankruptcy. The City of Milpitas launched street resurfacing near the mall in December 2024, and began the "Rediscover Main Street" sense-of-place corridor plan running through the summer of 2026 to link nearby commercial districts to the Great Mall Parkway area.

== See also ==
- Concord Mills and Katy Mills, also renovated by Simon and Graycor
- Fairlane Town Center – an earlier mall developed by Ford Land
- Ford City Mall
- Ontario Mills – a similar mall developed by the Mills Corporation
- The Outlets at Orange
