= Great Mall station =

VTA light rail station in Milpitas, California

Great Mall
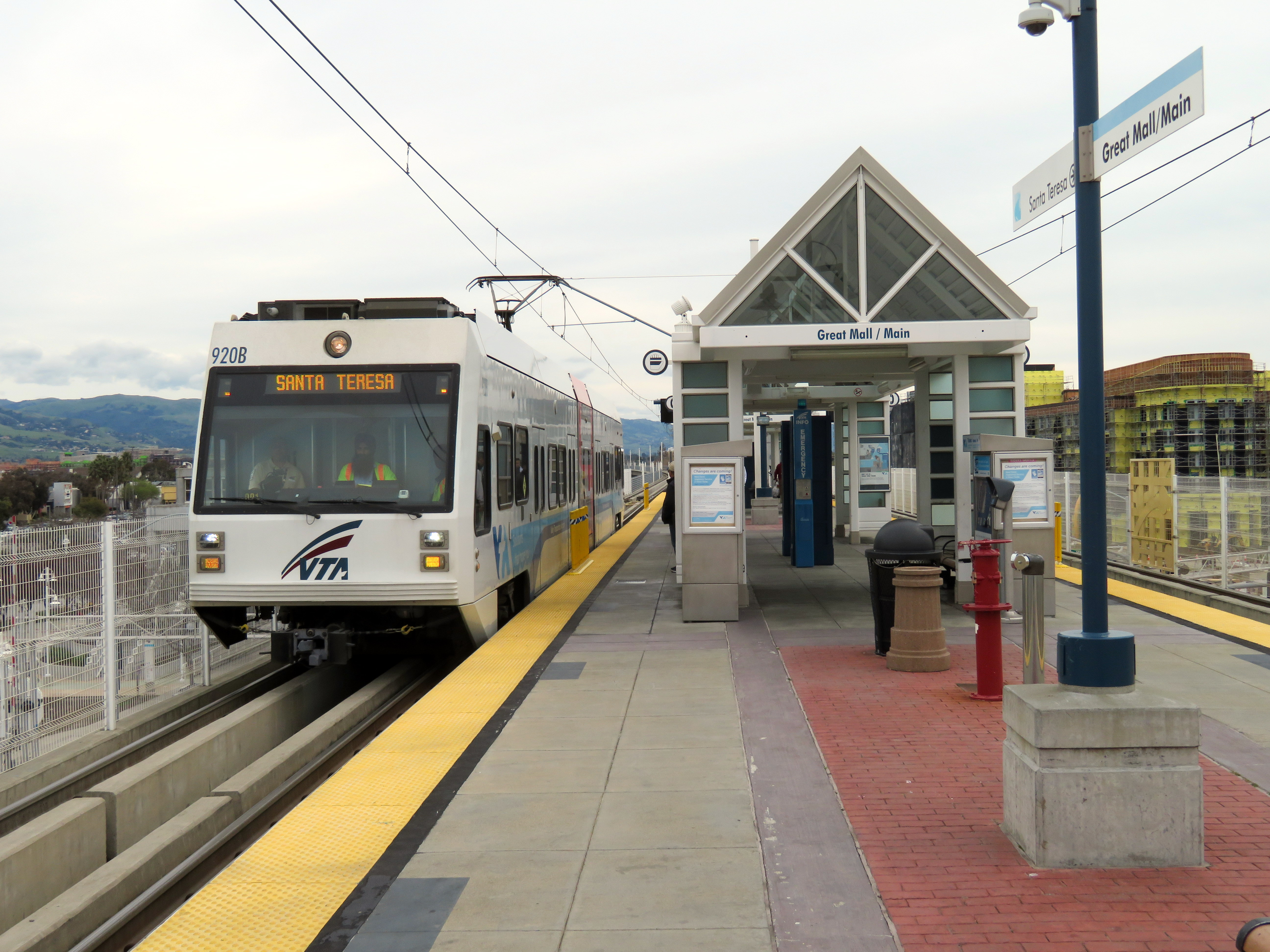
- Great Mall station platform in March 2018

General information
- Location: Great Mall Parkway at Main Street; Milpitas, California
- Coordinates: 37°24′51″N 121°54′06″W
- Owner: Santa Clara Valley Transportation Authority
- Line: Tasman East/Capitol
- Platforms: 1 island platform
- Tracks: 2
- Connections: VTA Bus: 66

Construction
- Structure type: Elevated
- Parking: 93 spaces
- Cycle facilities: Racks and lockers
- Accessible: Yes

History
- Opened: June 24, 2004
- Former names: Great Mall/Main Transit Center

Services
Preceding station	VTA	Following station
Alder toward Mountain View	Orange Line	Milpitas toward Alum Rock
Location

Great Mall station (formerly known as Great Mall/Main Transit Center) is a light rail station operated by the Santa Clara Valley Transportation Authority (VTA). The station is served by the Orange Line of the VTA light rail system. It is an elevated station over the intersection of Great Mall Parkway and Main Street in Milpitas, California. A pedestrian bridge connects the station to the nearby Great Mall of the Bay Area, after which the station is named.

The station was opened on June 24, 2004, as part of the second phase of VTA's Tasman East light rail extension.

This station formerly served as a major transfer point between VTA light rail and bus lines. The transit center was closed and the majority of the bus lines moved to the nearby Milpitas station which opened on December 28, 2019.
