= Warm Springs/South Fremont station =

Rapid transit station in San Francisco Bay Area

Warm Springs/ South Fremont
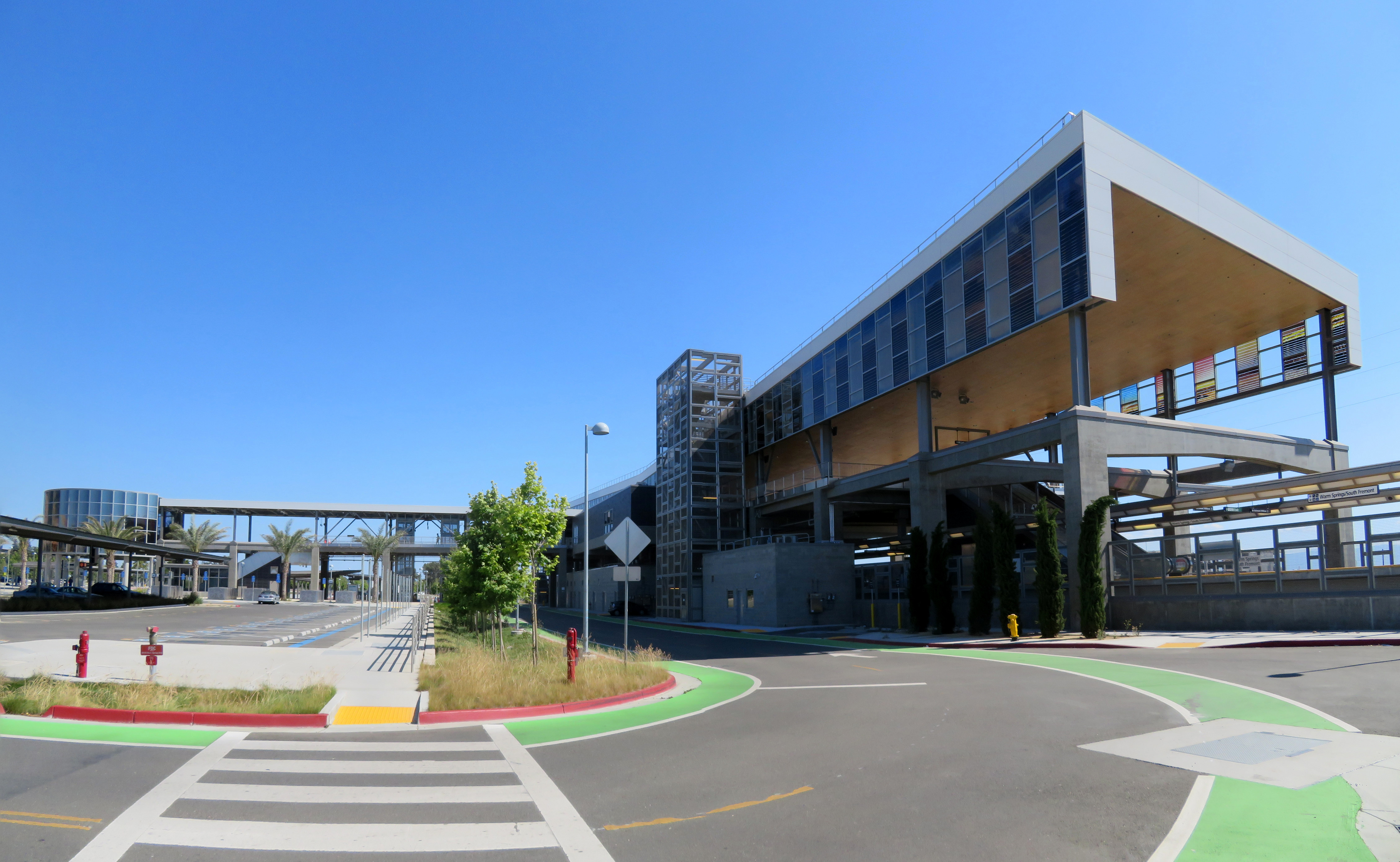
- Warm Springs/South Fremont station in June 2018

General information
- Location: 45193 Warm Springs Boulevard; Fremont, California
- Coordinates: 37.503°N 121.940°W
- Owner: San Francisco Bay Area Rapid Transit District
- Line: BART S-Line
- Platforms: 1 island platform
- Tracks: 2
- Connections: AC Transit: 215, 217, 239

Construction
- Structure type: At grade
- Parking: 2,082 spaces (42 EV)
- Cycle facilities: Yes
- Accessible: Yes

Other information
- Station code: BART: WARM

History
- Opened: March 25, 2017

Passengers
- 2025: 1,318 (weekday average)

Services
Preceding station	Bay Area Rapid Transit	Following station
Fremont toward Daly City	Green Line	Milpitas toward Berryessa
Fremont toward Richmond	Orange Line	Milpitas toward Berryessa
Location

Warm Springs/South Fremont station is a Bay Area Rapid Transit (BART) station located in the Warm Springs district of Fremont, California. The station is served by the Orange and Green lines. It was the southern terminus of both lines from its opening on March 25, 2017 until June 13, 2020, when Milpitas and Berryessa/North San José stations opened as part of the Silicon Valley BART extension.

The station has an island platform between the surface-level BART tracks, with a fare mezzanine above the platform. A footbridge connects the mezzanine to a rotunda which serves as the station entrance.

== History ==
=== Planning ===
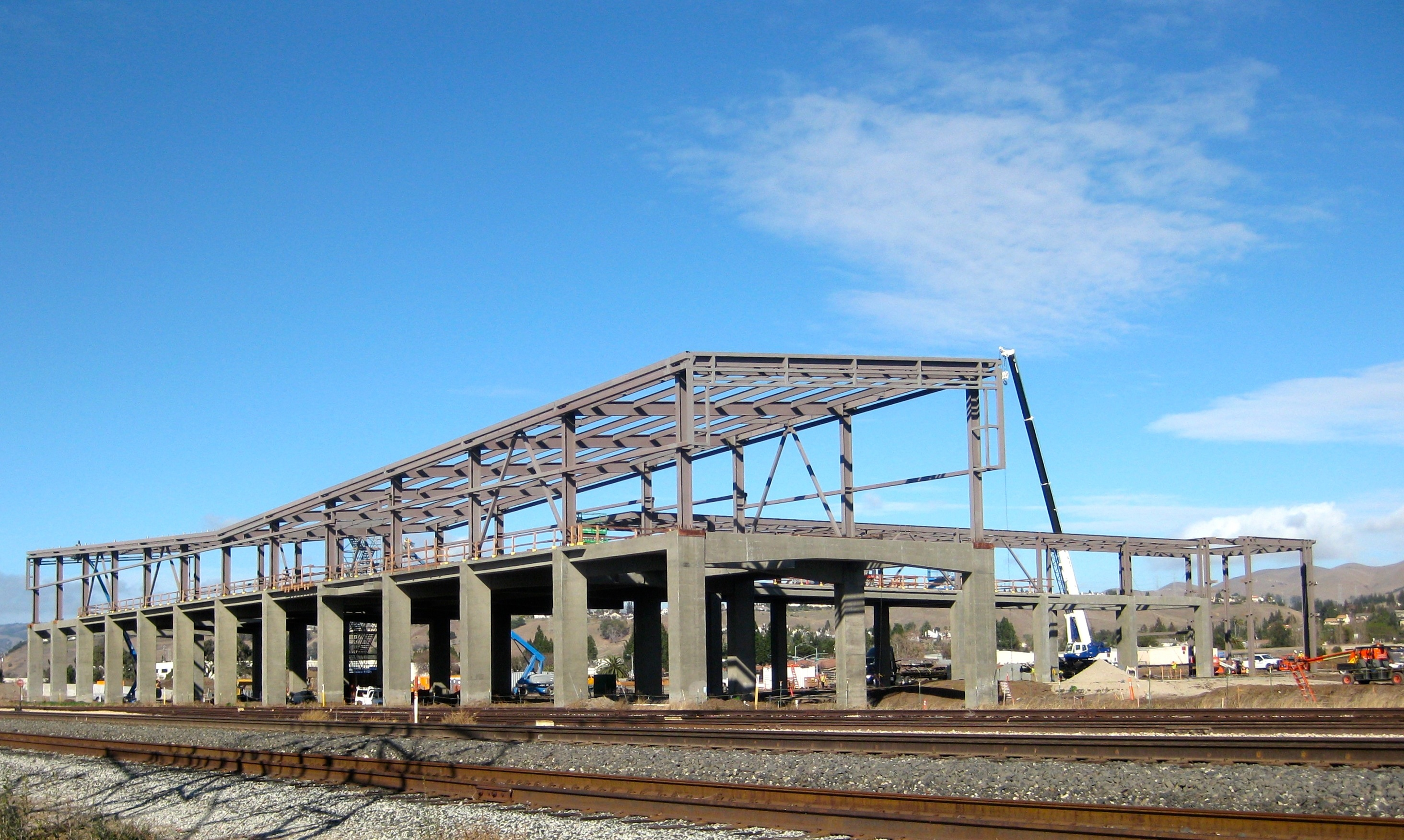
The station under construction in January 2014

Planning for the Warm Springs extension around 1994; by 1998, BART estimated it would cost $550 million, with 7,800 daily riders by 2010. A 1994 study by the Metropolitan Transportation Commission forecast 3,200 daily riders in 2010.

BART held a ceremonial groundbreaking for the Warm Springs Extension in September 2009, with completion then expected in 2014. Construction of the station began in 2011. The BART Board of Directors officially named the station Warm Springs/South Fremont on May 24, 2012. The name combined the historic neighborhood name of Warm Springs (the station name during planning) with the modern South Fremont designator.

=== Opening ===
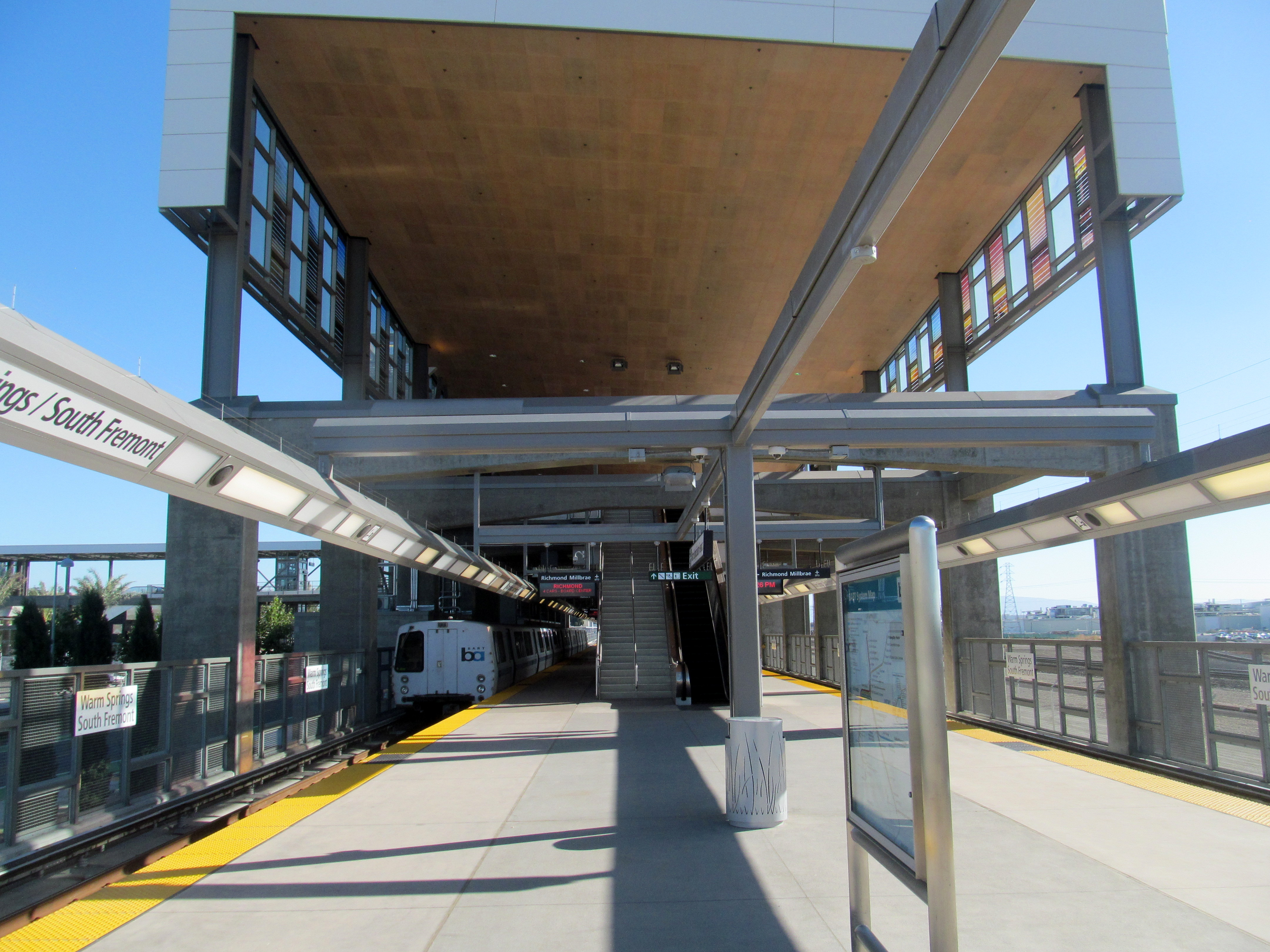
A train at the station in October 2017

The Warm Springs Extension suffered a series of delays from the original 2014 planned opening. BART power cables unexpectedly needed replacement, and the new train control system on the extension proved difficult to integrate with the original train control system on the rest of BART. By September 2016, BART planned to open the station the next month, which newspapers labeled an "October surprise" - a news event for the November 8 vote on a BART bond measure - but this did not occur. The yet-to-open station was fully staffed beginning in September 2016 because BART union positions are only reassigned twice per year.

The station ultimately opened on March 25, 2017. The conceptual design of the station was by local architect Robin Chiang, with final design by HNTB. San Francisco Chronicle architecture critic John King praised the entrance rotunda with Catherine Widgery’s “Sky Cycles” artwork, but criticized the rotunda being scaled down from Chiang's design, as well as the lack of seating on the platform. Seven bus bays south of the rotunda are used by AC Transit buses as well as private shuttles.

Because of delays with new BART railcars entering service, the station was initially served only by one line at a time (the Warm Springs/South Fremont–Daly City line on weekdays before 6 pm, and the Richmond-Warm Springs/South Fremont line at other times), with the other line running only to Fremont. On September 10, 2018, both lines began running to Warm Springs/South Fremont for their full operating hours.

Some VTA bus service switched from Fremont to Warm Springs/South Fremont on October 8, 2018 as a result of the increased service. Three of the four VTA routes serving Warm Springs were discontinued on December 28, 2019, during a reorganization of the VTA network. The remaining route was discontinued upon the June 13, 2020 opening of the first phase of the Silicon Valley BART extension (after which Warm Springs/South Fremont station was no longer the southern terminal of East Bay BART service) leaving only AC Transit buses serving the station.

=== Adjacent development ===
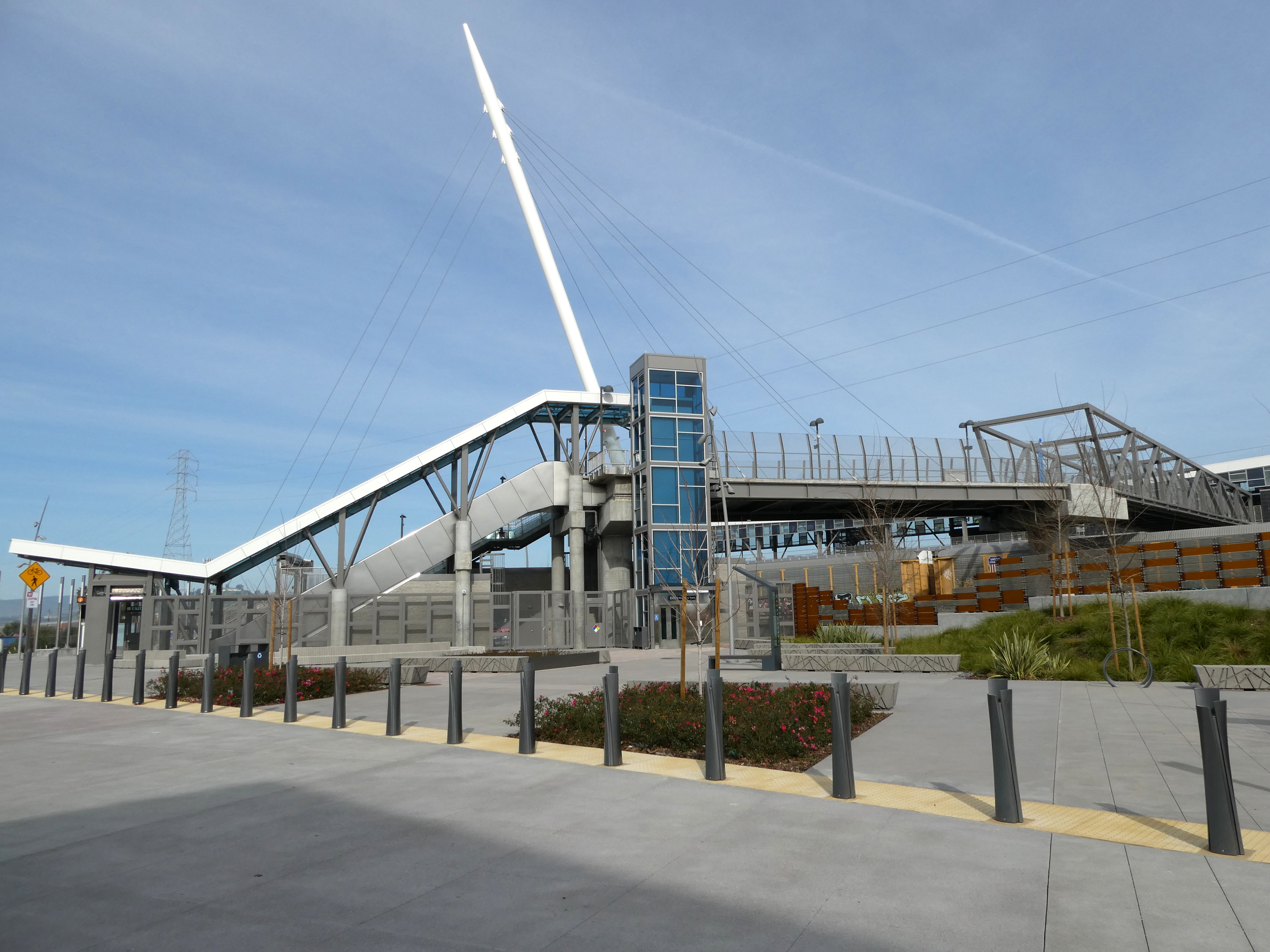
The newly-opened footbridge, February 2022

Warm Springs/South Fremont station is the centerpiece of the 880-acre (360 ha) Warm Springs Community Plan area, which the city of Fremont designated for federally-assisted transit oriented development (TOD) projects with higher density than the rest of Warm Springs. The Union Pacific Railroad (UP) Warm Springs Subdivision runs just west of the Warm Springs Extension tracks. In 2011, UP purchased 160 acres (65 ha) of land adjacent to the former NUMMI plant across the parallel tracks from the under-construction station, intending to build a rail yard. The city, which had included that land in its development plans, hired a lobbyist in an attempt to accelerate the development and prevent the construction of the rail yard. In May 2015, Lennar acquired the northern 111 acres (45 ha) of the land from UP.

In February 2016, the city approved plans for a cable-stayed pedestrian and bicycle bridge connecting the station mezzanine to a new plaza on the west side of the tracks, to which pedestrian access has been otherwise deemed difficult. The bridge, then planned for completion in 2018, would provide access from the new developments and the adjacent Tesla Factory, which had no convenient pedestrian route to the station because of the rail lines. During the bidding process, the cost of the bridge was increased from $25 million to $35 million, and completion delayed to 2020. Construction began in early 2019. The main span was put in place in September 2019. After additional delays, the bridge opened on February 3, 2022, at a final cost of $41 million.

As of 2024, BART anticipates soliciting a developer between 2029 and 2033 for TOD to replace surface parking lots at the station.
