= Green Line (BART) =

Rapid transit line in the San Francisco Bay Area, California

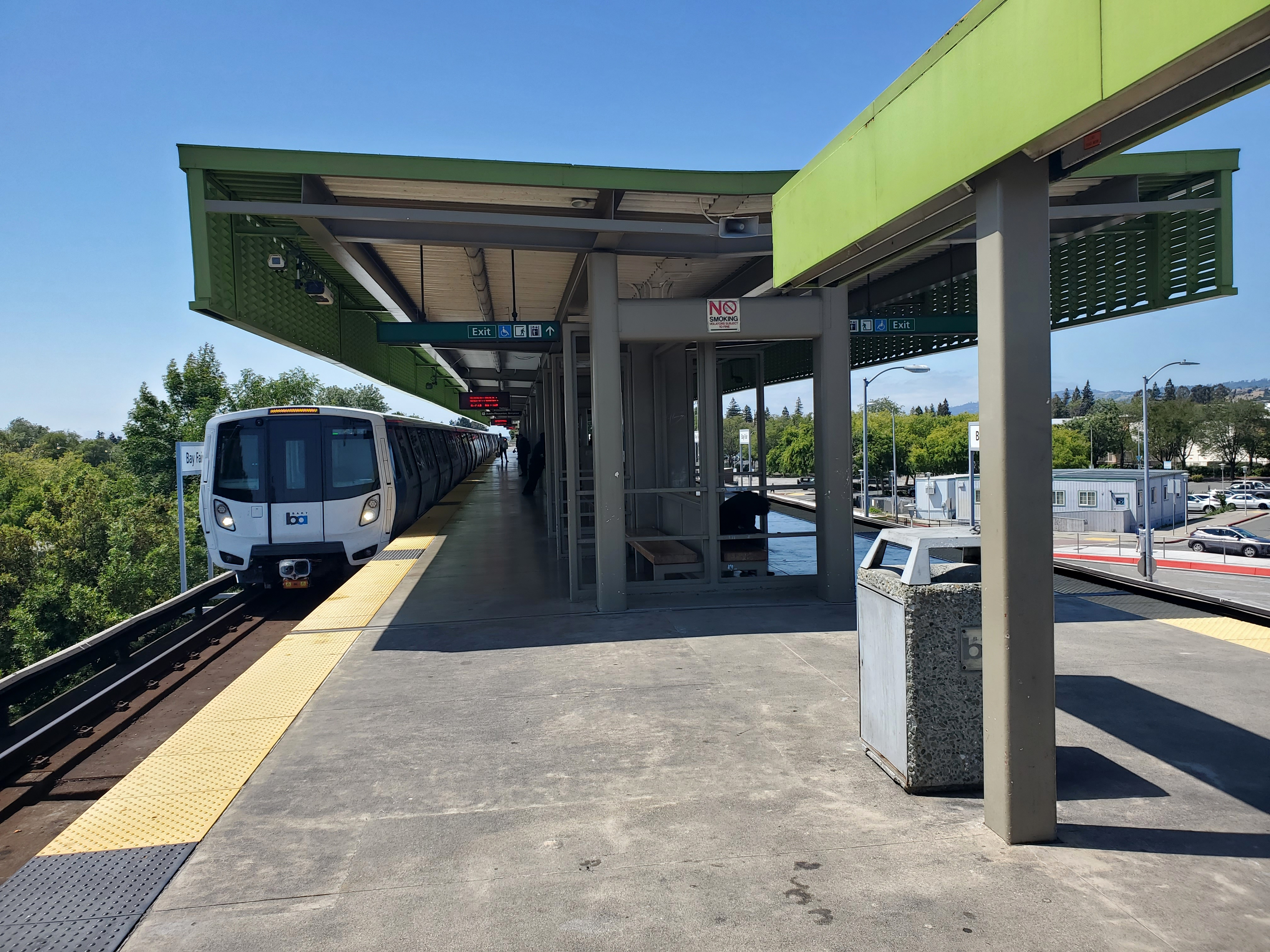
- Southbound train at Bay Fair station in May 2024

Overview
- Owner: San Francisco Bay Area Rapid Transit District
- Locale: South Bay, East Bay, San Francisco Peninsula
- Termini: Berryessa; Daly City
- Stations: 22

Service
- Type: Rapid transit
- System: Bay Area Rapid Transit

History
- Opened: September 16, 1974

Technical
- Line length: 53 mi (85 km)
- Track gauge: 5 ft 6 in (1,676 mm)
- Electrification: Third rail, 1 kV DC
- Operating speed: 70 mph (110 km/h)
Route map
Green Line highlighted in green

The Green Line is a Bay Area Rapid Transit (BART) line in the San Francisco Bay Area that runs between Berryessa/North San José station and Daly City station. It has 22 stations in San Jose, Milpitas, Fremont, Union City, Hayward, San Leandro, Oakland, San Francisco, and Daly City. The line shares tracks with the four other primary BART services.

As of February 14, 2022, the line runs until 9 pm every day. At other times, service along the route is provided by the Orange Line and the Blue Line, with timed transfers at Bay Fair station.

== History ==
The Green Line was the third of BART's five rapid transit lines to open. Transbay service began when the Transbay Tube opened on September 16, 1974, connecting the Montgomery Street–Daly City section (opened November 5, 1973) with the East Bay sections of the system. Initial Transbay service was two lines: the Yellow Line and the Green Line. The extension to Warm Springs/South Fremont station opened on March 25, 2017. Until September 10, 2018, Saturday service on the line only ran to Fremont station.

A second extension to Berryessa/North San José station as part of the Silicon Valley extension project opened on June 13, 2020. The full extension is planned to eventually reach 28th Street/Little Portugal, Downtown San José, Diridon, and Santa Clara stations in 2029 or 2030.

== Stations ==
Station	Jurisdiction	County	Opened	Rail connections
Berryessa/North San José	San Jose	Santa Clara	June 13, 2020	BART:
Milpitas	Milpitas	Santa Clara	June 13, 2020	BART: VTA:
Warm Springs/South Fremont	Fremont	Alameda	March 25, 2017	BART:
Fremont	Fremont	Alameda	September 11, 1972	BART:
Union City	Union City	Alameda	September 11, 1972	BART:
South Hayward	Hayward	Alameda	September 11, 1972	BART:
Hayward	Hayward	Alameda	September 11, 1972	BART:
Bay Fair	San Leandro	Alameda	September 11, 1972	BART:
San Leandro	San Leandro	Alameda	September 11, 1972	BART:
Coliseum	Oakland	Alameda	September 11, 1972	BART: Amtrak: Capitol Corridor
Fruitvale	Oakland	Alameda	September 11, 1972	BART:
Lake Merritt	Oakland	Alameda	September 11, 1972	BART:
West Oakland	Oakland	Alameda	September 16, 1974	BART:
Embarcadero	San Francisco		May 27, 1976	BART: Muni: Cable Cars
Montgomery Street	San Francisco		November 5, 1973	BART: Muni:
Powell Street	San Francisco		November 5, 1973	BART: Muni: Cable Cars
Civic Center/UN Plaza	San Francisco		November 5, 1973	BART: Muni: Cable Cars
16th Street Mission	San Francisco		November 5, 1973	BART:
24th Street Mission	San Francisco		November 5, 1973	BART:
Glen Park	San Francisco		November 5, 1973	BART: Muni:
Balboa Park	San Francisco		November 5, 1973	BART: Muni:
Daly City	Daly City	San Mateo	November 5, 1973	BART:
