= Berryessa station (VTA) =

VTA light rail station in San Jose, California

Berryessa
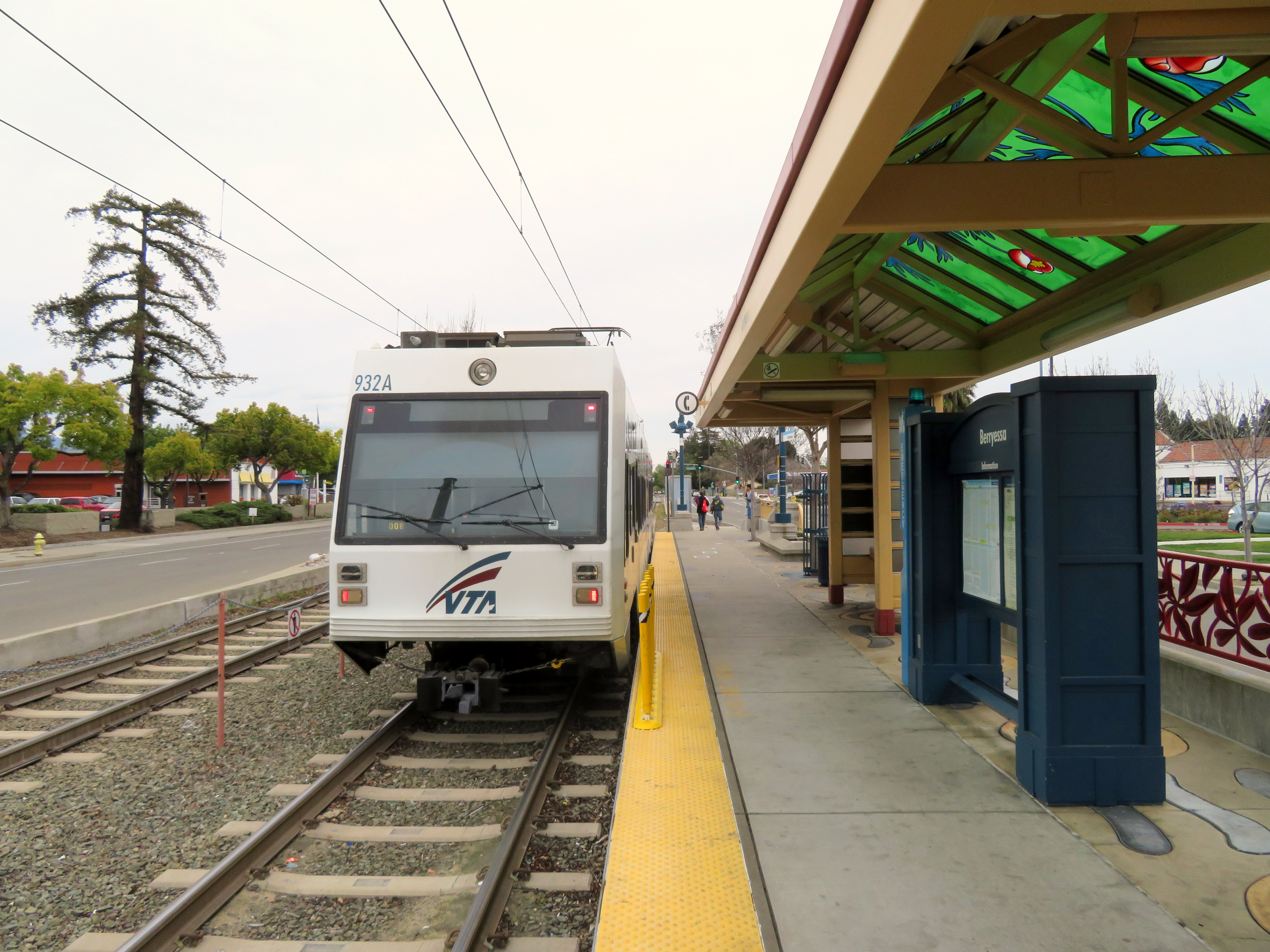
- Berryessa station platform in March 2018

General information
- Location: Capitol Avenue at Berryessa Road; San Jose, California
- Coordinates: 37°23′14″N 121°51′41″W
- Owner: Santa Clara Valley Transportation Authority
- Line: Tasman East/Capitol
- Platforms: 2 side platforms
- Tracks: 2
- Connections: VTA Bus: 61

Construction
- Structure type: At-grade
- Accessible: Yes

History
- Opened: June 24, 2004; 22 years ago

Services
Preceding station	VTA	Following station
Hostetter toward Mountain View	Orange Line	Penitencia Creek toward Alum Rock
Location

Berryessa station is a light rail station operated by Santa Clara Valley Transportation Authority (VTA), located in the median of North Capitol Avenue, just north of Berryessa Road in San Jose, California. This station is served by VTA's Orange Line.

The station was opened on June 24, 2004, as part of VTA's Capitol light rail extension.
