= Fremont station (BART) =

Metro station in Fremont, California, US

Fremont
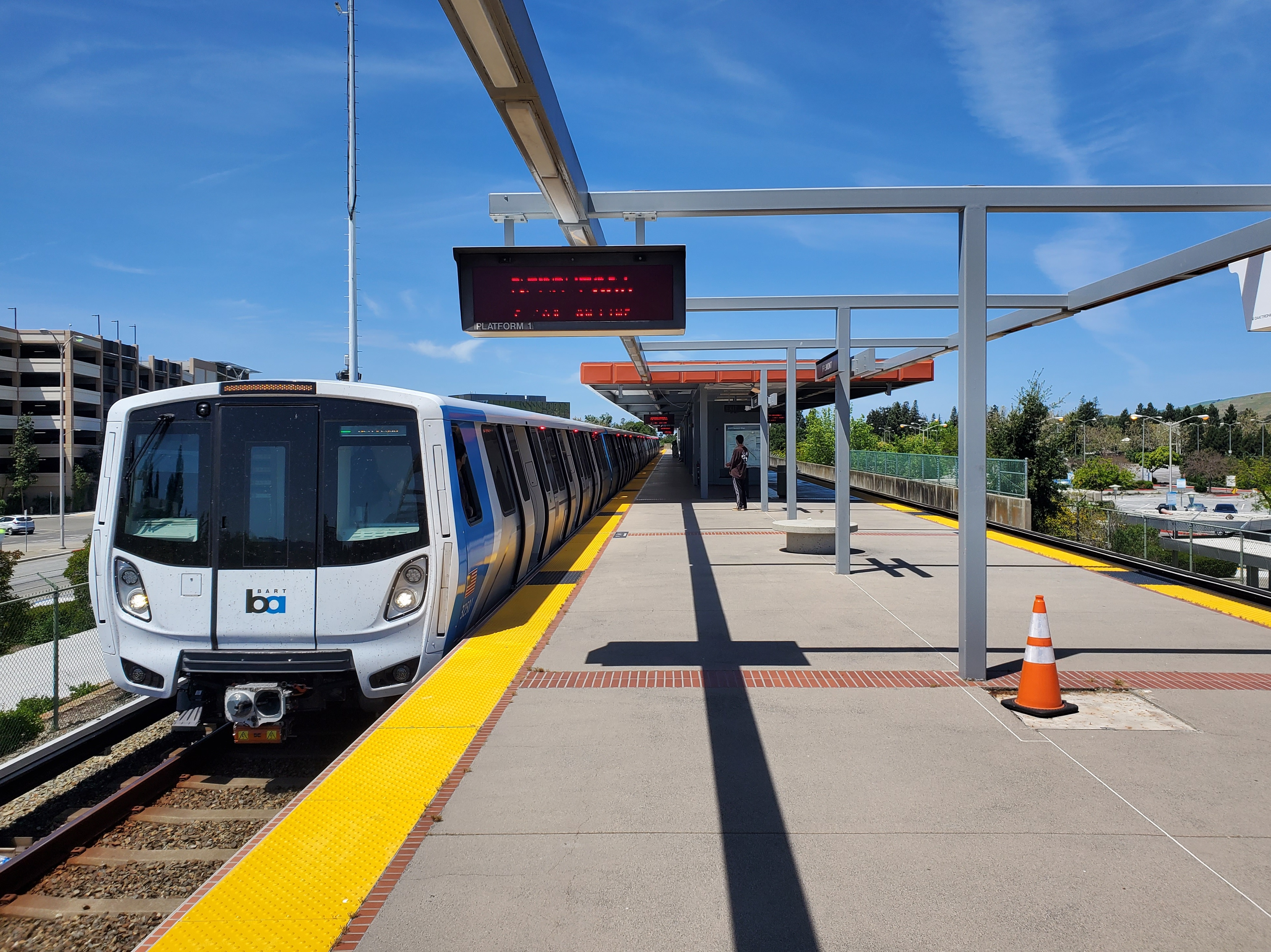
- A southbound train at Fremont station in April 2024

General information
- Location: 2000 Bart Way; Fremont, California
- Coordinates: 37.557489°N 121.97662°W
- Line: BART A-Line
- Platforms: 1 island platform
- Tracks: 2
- Connections: AC Transit: U, 200, 211, 216, 231, 239, 251, 707, 801; Marguerite: AE-F, EB

Construction
- Structure type: Elevated
- Parking: 2,030 spaces
- Cycle facilities: 76 lockers
- Accessible: Yes
- Architect: Kitchen & Hunt

Other information
- Station code: BART: FRMT

History
- Opened: September 11, 1972

Passengers
- 2026: 2,568 (weekday average)

Services
Preceding station	Bay Area Rapid Transit	Following station
Union City toward Daly City	Green Line	Warm Springs/South Fremont toward Berryessa
Union City toward Richmond	Orange Line	Warm Springs/South Fremont toward Berryessa
Location

Fremont station is a Bay Area Rapid Transit (BART) station in the central district of Fremont, California. The station is served by the Orange and Green lines. It was the southern terminus of both lines from September 11, 1972, until March 25, 2017, when Warm Springs/South Fremont station opened.

== History ==
=== Construction ===
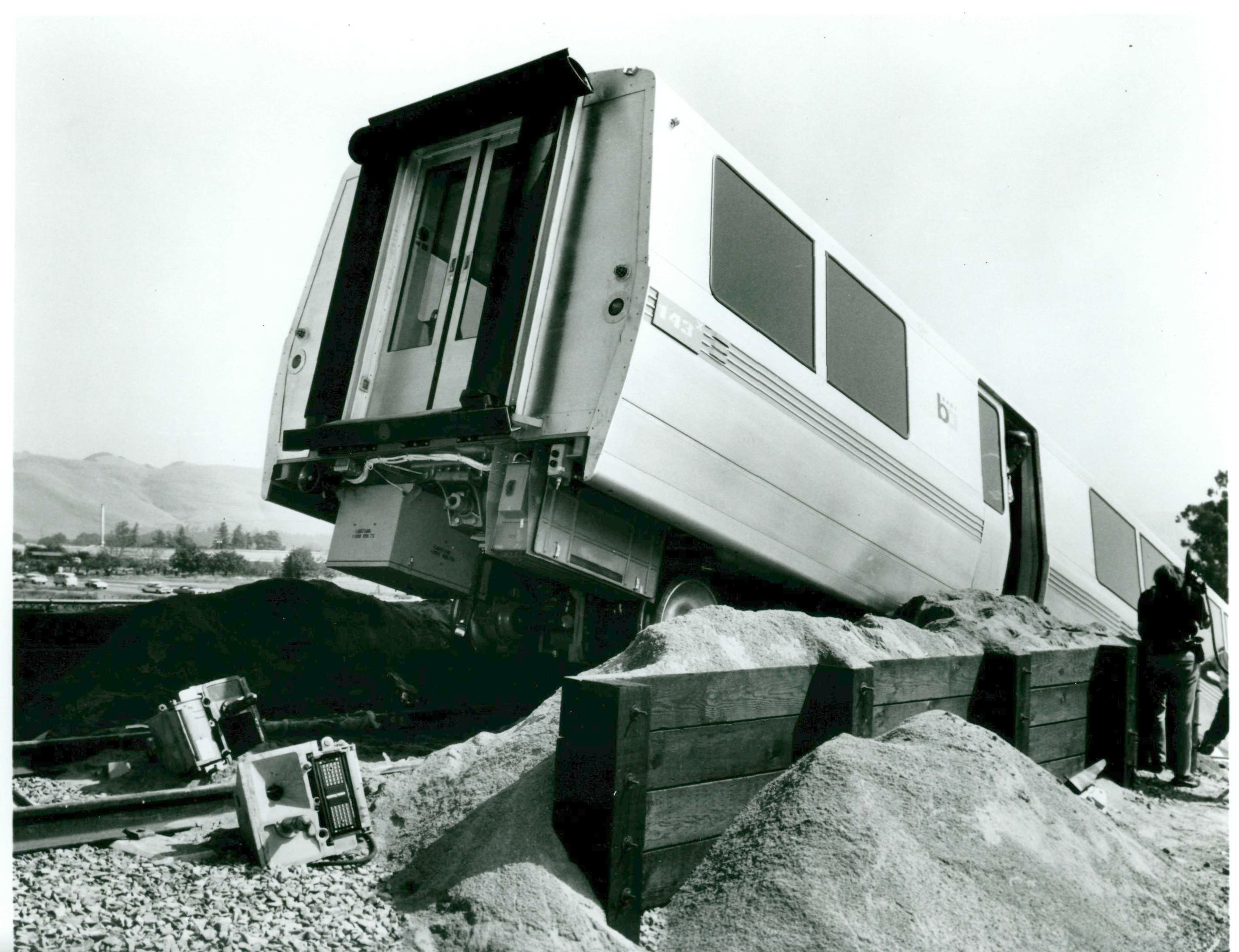
The "Fremont Flyer" in 1972

The BART Board approved the name "Fremont" in December 1965. Service at the station began on September 11, 1972. It cost just over $2 million to build. Due to a national strike that year by elevator constructors, elevator construction on the early stations was delayed. Elevators at most of the initial stations, including Fremont, were completed in the months following the opening.

During the first months of revenue service, the Automatic Train Control (ATC) system had safety problems with its design and operation. On October 2, 1972, an ATC failure caused a train to run off the end of the elevated track at the Fremont station and crash to the ground - an incident dubbed the "Fremont Flyer". Four people on board were injured. The incident drew national and international attention, followed a month later by release of the "Post Report" on BART safety by the legislative analyst for the California State Senate. The "Fremont Flyer" train crash led to a comprehensive redesign of the ATC system, the firing of the general manager, and the replacement of the board of directors.

=== Parking and buses ===
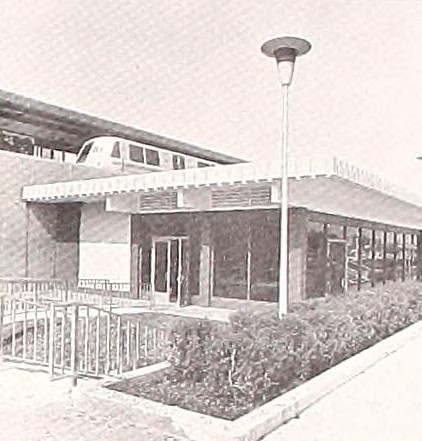
The newly opened east entrance in 1980

Fremont station was not initially served by connecting buses. The Santa Clara County Transit District – later Santa Clara Valley Transportation Authority (VTA) – bus service began operating Fremont station—San Jose service on June 25, 1973, connecting BART with the South Bay transit system. AC Transit service was expanded to Fremont in November 1974, and to Newark that December, with Fremont station as a hub. Peerless Stages, a private carrier, began operating intercity bus service to the station by 1977.

Fremont station opened with a 700-space parking lot, which quickly proved too small; BART was considering expansion of the lot by late 1973. Public hearings for an expansion took place in early 1975. By mid-1975, the lot typically filled up before 7 am, and riders parked on streets as far as a mile from the station. Some 41% of those parking at the station were from Santa Clara County, outside the BART district, for which Fremont was the nearest station. The expansion plans were slowed by BART board politics about who should pay for such projects. The board ultimately approved the plan to add 361 spaces in November 1975.

The board issued a $590,605 contract in February 1977 and construction began that April. The new lot with 300 spaces opened on June 16, 1977. It was created by filling a water retention lagoon and covering it with gravel. After a year of allowing the fill to settle, paving work began in May 1978. In September 1978, the board awarded a $269,000 contract to create a new east entrance to the station. The work included a 2,200-square-foot (200 m^{2}) expansion of the fare lobby, new faregates, a bus transfer plaza, and a new access road. The paved lot opened on October 29, 1978, leaving the station with 1,000 parking spaces; construction of the new entrance began at that time. The east entrance and the bus plaza opened on April 7, 1980.

In April 1981, BART opened bidding for construction of an additional parking lot off Mowry Avenue on the north side of the station. The interim gravel lot cost $173,000 to construct, plus $216,000 to acquire the land from Caltrans. It opened in March 1982 with approximately 500–600 spaces, increasing total capacity at the station to 1,500–1,600 spaces. Later that year, BART installed canopies at the bus transfer area. The Mowry Avenue lot was expanded and paved in 1986 using UMTA funds. The older lots were reconfigured in 1987 to add 391 spaces, with a final count of 2,374 spaces. The station was renovated in 1997, with the bus plaza expanded.

=== 21st century ===
Fremont was the southern terminus of East Bay BART service until March 25, 2017, when the line was extended to Warm Springs/South Fremont station. On December 28, 2019, VTA discontinued service to Fremont station as part of a systemwide network modification, which was originally intended be simultaneous with the opening of the BART extension to Berryessa/North San Jose station. However, the BART extension did not open until June 13, 2020, leaving Warm Springs/South Fremont as the only connecting point between the two systems until that time.

As of 2024, BART anticipates soliciting developer proposals by 2028 for transit-oriented development to replace surface parking lots at the station. The A85 interlocking just west of the station is being rebuilt in 2026–2027. About 750 of the station's 1,900 parking spaces are closed from May 25, 2026, to February 2027 to allow for staging of construction equipment.

== Transit connections ==
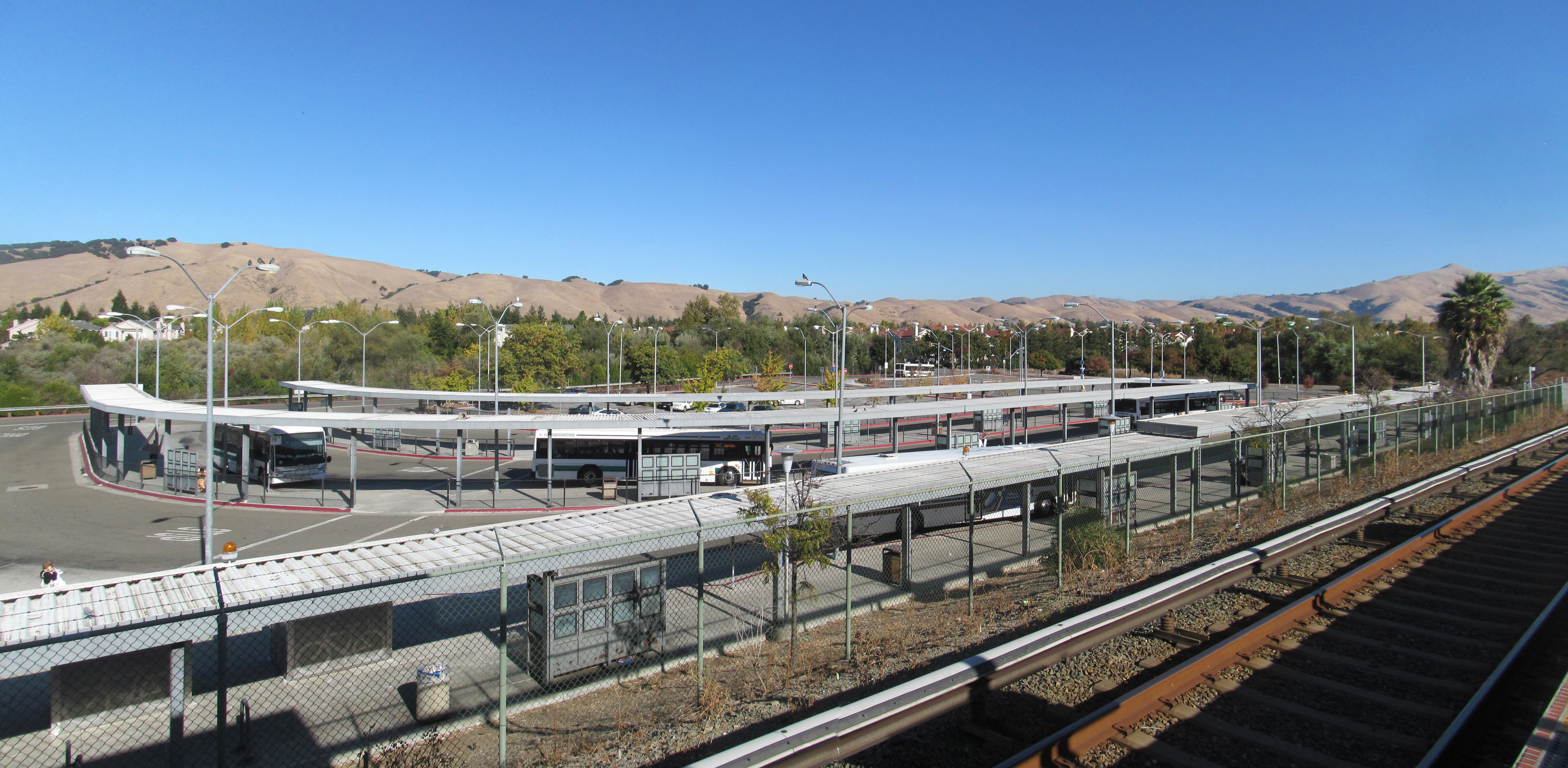
Bus bays at Fremont station

A three-lane bus plaza on the east side of Fremont station is a transfer hub for AC Transit buses:

- Local routes: 200, 211, 216, 231, 239, 251
- Early Bird Express: 707
- All Nighter: 801

Two Stanford Marguerite Shuttle routes, AE-F and East Bay Express, also terminate at Fremont.
