= Penitencia Creek station =

VTA light rail station in San Jose, California

Penitencia Creek
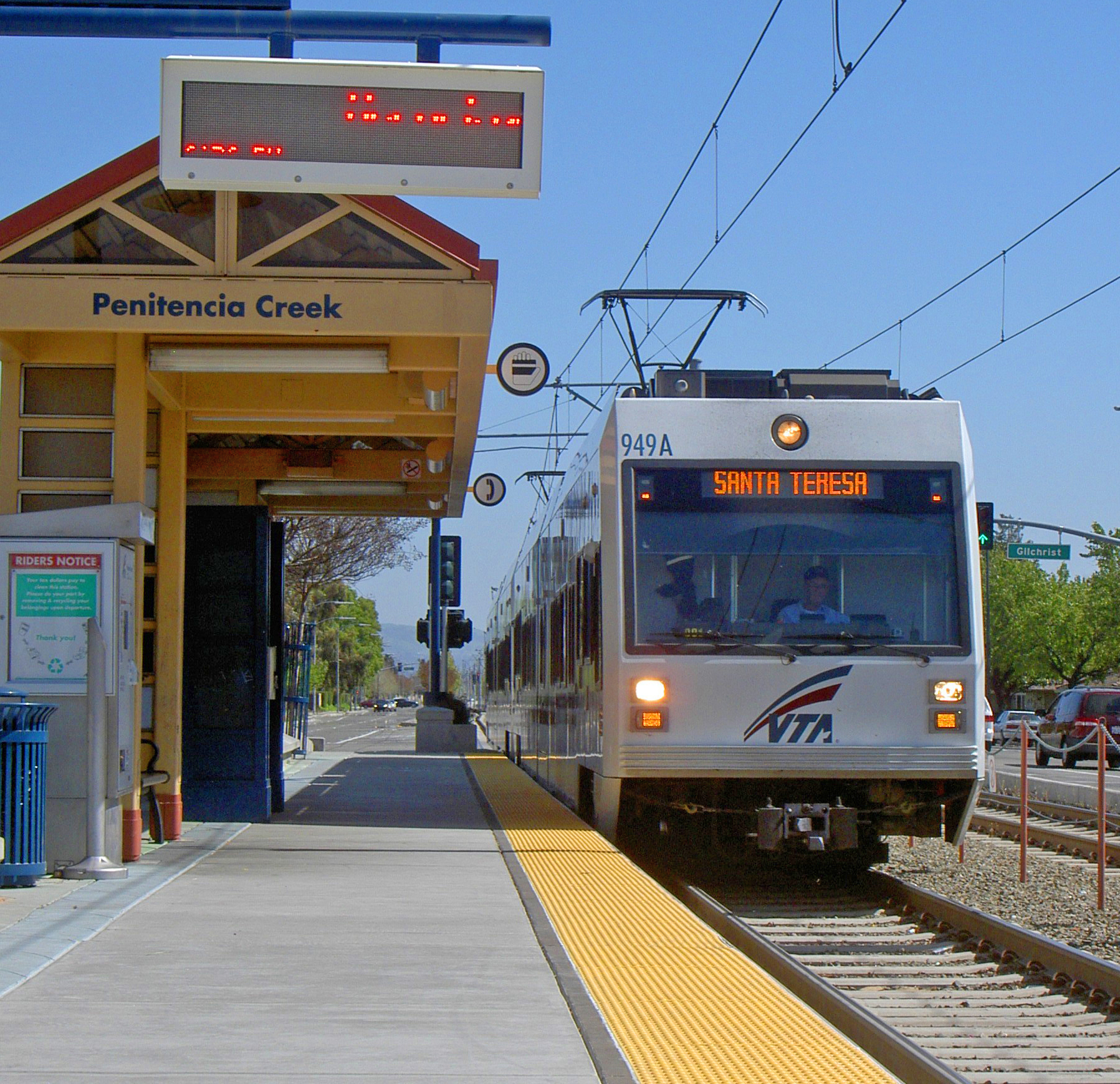
- Penitencia Creek station platform

General information
- Location: Capitol Avenue and Penitencia Creek Road; San Jose, California
- Coordinates: 37°22′57″N 121°51′22″W
- Owner: Santa Clara Valley Transportation Authority
- Line: Tasman East/Capitol
- Platforms: 2 side platforms
- Tracks: 2

Construction
- Structure type: At-grade
- Parking: 53 spaces
- Cycle facilities: Lockers
- Accessible: Yes

History
- Opened: June 24, 2004; 22 years ago

Services
Preceding station	VTA	Following station
Berryessa toward Mountain View	Orange Line	McKee toward Alum Rock
Location

Penitencia Creek station is a light rail station operated by Santa Clara Valley Transportation Authority (VTA), located in the median of North Capitol Avenue, just south of Penitencia Creek Road in San Jose, California. This station is served by VTA's Orange Line.

The station was opened on June 24, 2004, as part of VTA's Capitol light rail extension.
