= Great Northern Mall =

Great Northern Mall can refer to the following:

- Great Northern Mall (New York) in Clay, New York, USA
- Great Northern Mall (Ohio) in North Olmsted, Ohio, USA

== See also ==
- The Great Mall (disambiguation)
- North Grand Mall, Ames, Iowa, USA
