= Milpitas station =

Transit center served by BART trains, VTA light rail and buses

Milpitas
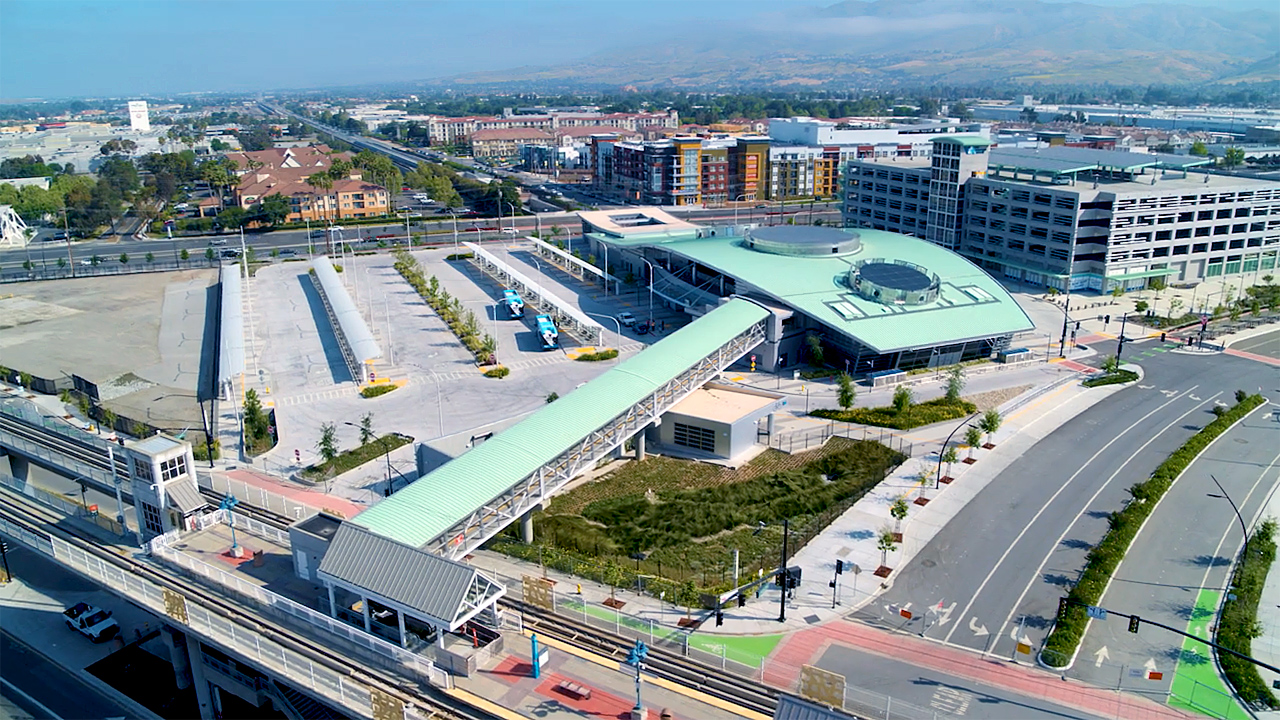
- Transit center with BART & bus stations (background) and light rail platforms (foreground).

General information
- Other names: Milpitas Transit Center
- Location: 1755 South Milpitas Boulevard; Milpitas, California; United States
- Coordinates: 37°24′37″N 121°53′28″W
- Owner: Santa Clara Valley Transportation Authority
- Lines: BART S-Line; VTA: Tasman East/Capitol
- Platforms: 2 side platforms (BART); 1 island platform (VTA)
- Tracks: 2 (BART); 2 (VTA)
- Bus routes: VTA Bus: 20, 47, 60, 66, 70, 71, 77, 104; AC Transit: 231

Construction
- Structure type: Elevated (VTA light rail); Below-grade (BART)
- Parking: 1,631 spaces
- Cycle facilities: Yes
- Accessible: Yes

Other information
- Station code: BART: MLPT

History
- Opened: June 24, 2004; 22 years ago (VTA light rail); December 28, 2019; 6 years ago (Bus plaza); June 13, 2020; 6 years ago (BART)
- Former names: Montague (2004–2019)

Passengers
- 2026: 1,861 (weekday average) (BART)
Services
Preceding station	Bay Area Rapid Transit	Following station
Warm Springs/South Fremont toward Daly City	Green Line	Berryessa Terminus
Warm Springs/South Fremont toward Richmond	Orange Line	Berryessa Terminus
Preceding station	VTA	Following station
Great Mall toward Mountain View	Orange Line	Cropley toward Alum Rock
Track layout
Location

Milpitas station, also known as Milpitas Transit Center, is an intermodal transit station located near the intersection of East Capitol Avenue and Montague Expressway in Milpitas, California, United States. The station is served by the Orange and Green lines of Bay Area Rapid Transit (BART), the Orange Line of the VTA light rail system, VTA buses, and AC Transit buses.

The elevated Montague light rail station opened in June 2004. It was renamed Milpitas in December 2019 when the bus plaza and connecting footbridge were opened. The below-grade BART station, constructed as part of the Silicon Valley BART extension, opened in June 2020 along with a parking garage.

== History ==
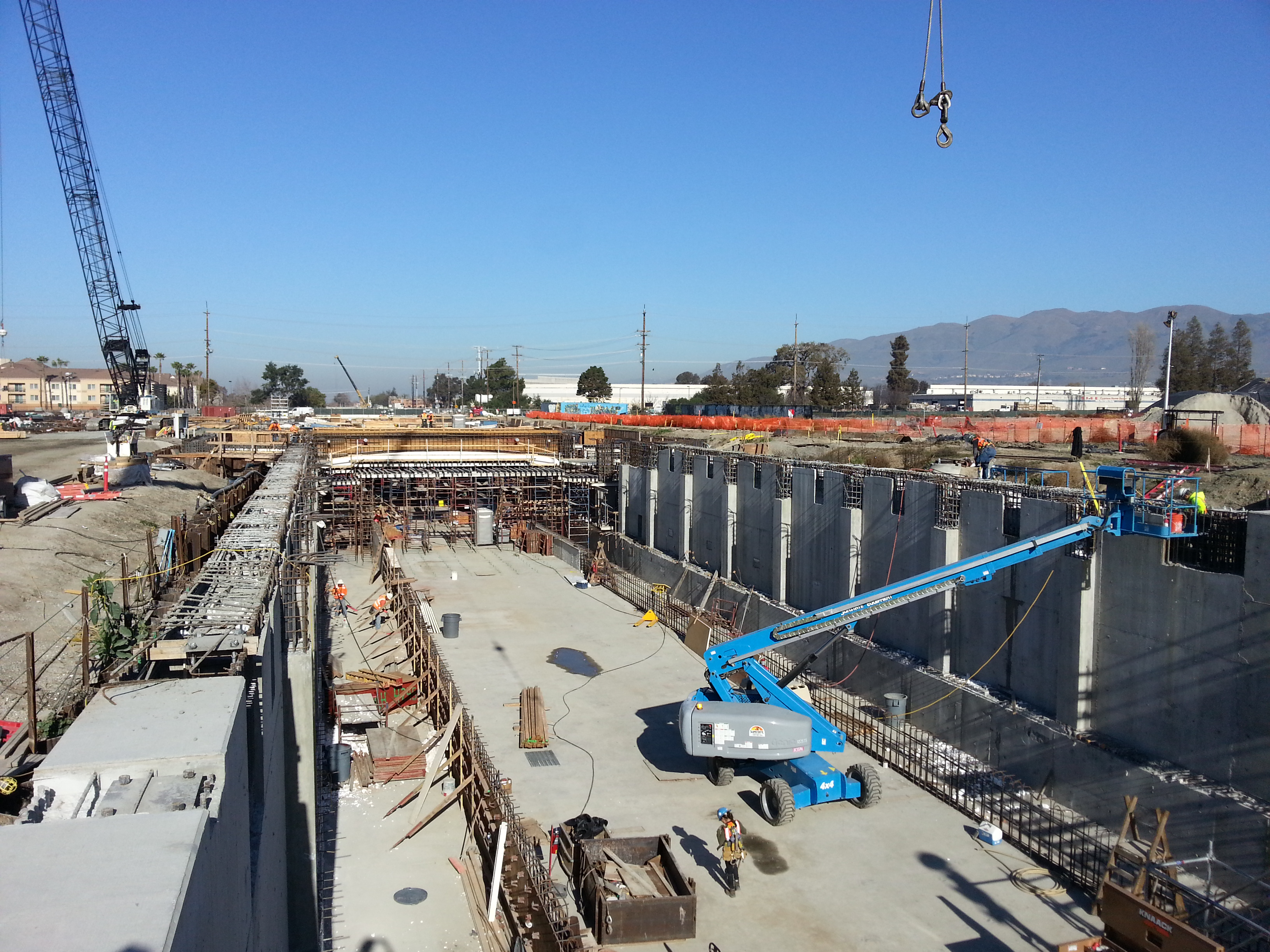
The BART station under construction in 2015

The VTA Light Rail station opened as Montague station on June 24, 2004, as part of the Tasman East expansion, originally without any parking spaces.

The BART station is the northern of two stations constructed as part of the $2.3 billion phase I of the Silicon Valley BART extension, which broke ground in 2012. The complex was built by and is owned by the VTA. Opening was delayed repeatedly from its 2016 completion date.

In December 2019, the VTA and AC Transit bus station opened, while the light rail station was officially renamed from Montague to Milpitas.

An official ribbon cutting for the BART station was held on June 12, 2020, with service beginning the next day on June 13, 2020.

A 229-foot (70 m)-long footbridge crosses Montague Expressway on the north side of the station. Construction of the $19.33 million bridge, which connects to the second level of the garage, began in 2019; it opened in July 2021.

== Station layout ==
Layout of the Milpitas station complex

The Milpitas station complex is located near the intersection of East Capitol Avenue and the Montague Expressway, near the south border of Milpitas. The BART tracks run roughly north–south in a trench below street level, with two 700-foot (210 m)-long side platforms. The station building is approximately 430 by 160 feet (131 m × 49 m), with an undulating roofline and three large circular skylights. Entrances are on the east and west sides of the station building, near its southern end, leading to a central corridor. Fare control areas are on opposite sides of the corridor; both have stairs and escalators to the platform, with elevators in the north fare control area.

The BART station features stained glass windows by BJ Katz and Chris Klein, titled Ethos of Imagination, above the main entrance. Twenty support columns along the platforms are encased in ceramic tiles by Amy Trachtenberg, titled Ecstatic Voyaging, patterned after the ikat dyeing technique.

The light rail tracks are elevated above East Capitol Avenue, running approximately northwest–southeast. A mezzanine is located under the single island platform, with stairs and an elevator to the median of East Capitol Avenue at South Milpitas Boulevard. A pedestrian bridge leads from the light rail mezzanine northwest to the west side of the BART building where escalators and an elevator lead to the plaza.

The bus plaza is located west of the BART station building. It is served by nine VTA bus routes (20, 47, 60, 66, 70, 71, 77, 104, and 203) and one AC Transit route (231); it serves as a transfer point between the two bus systems. It is the only BART station served by both VTA and AC Transit, and the only VTA light rail station served by AC Transit. The six-story, 1,631 space paid parking garage is located east of the BART building. A paid 185-space indoor bike parking structure is located underneath the footbridge; free bike racks are dispersed around the station.

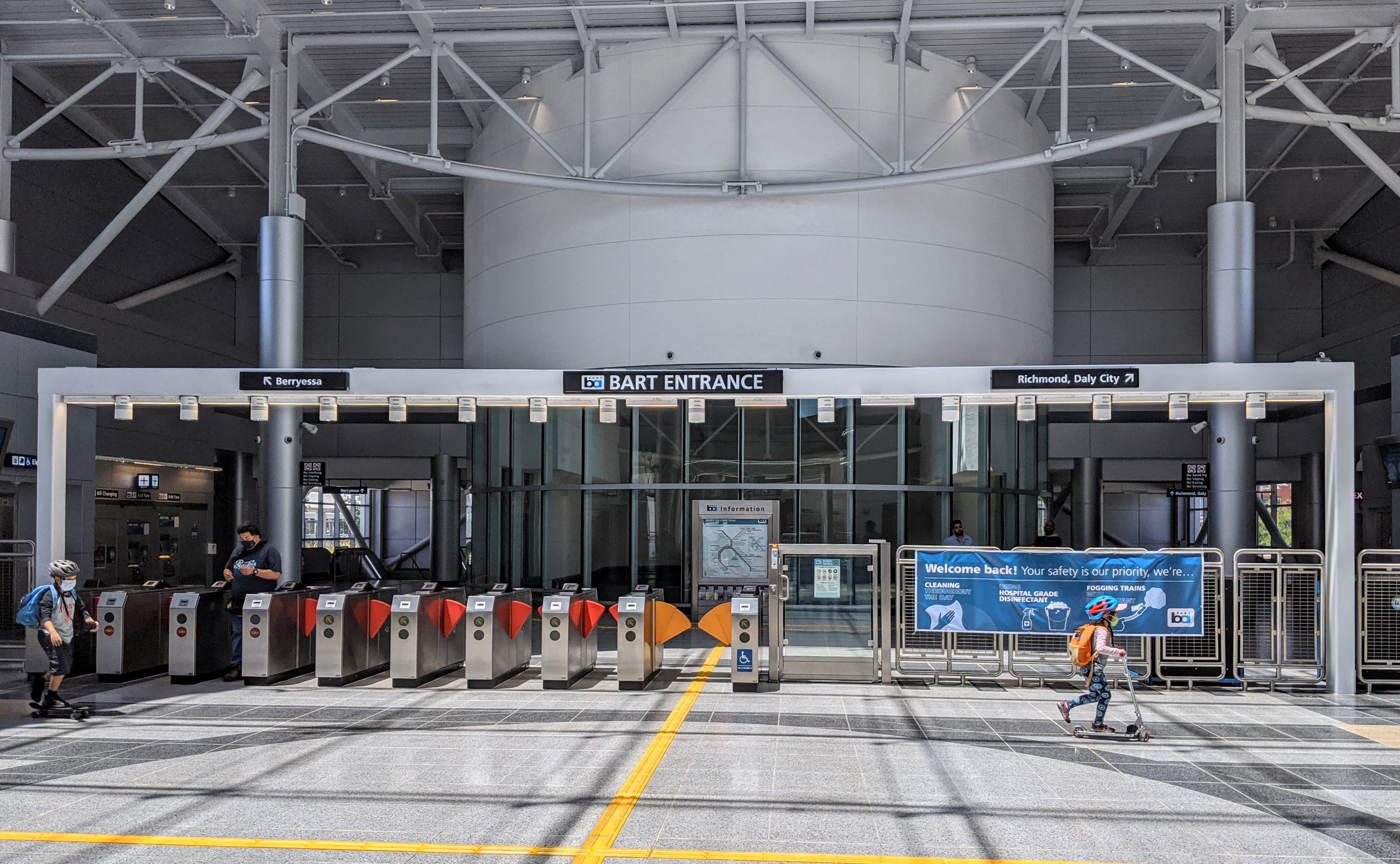
BART faregates

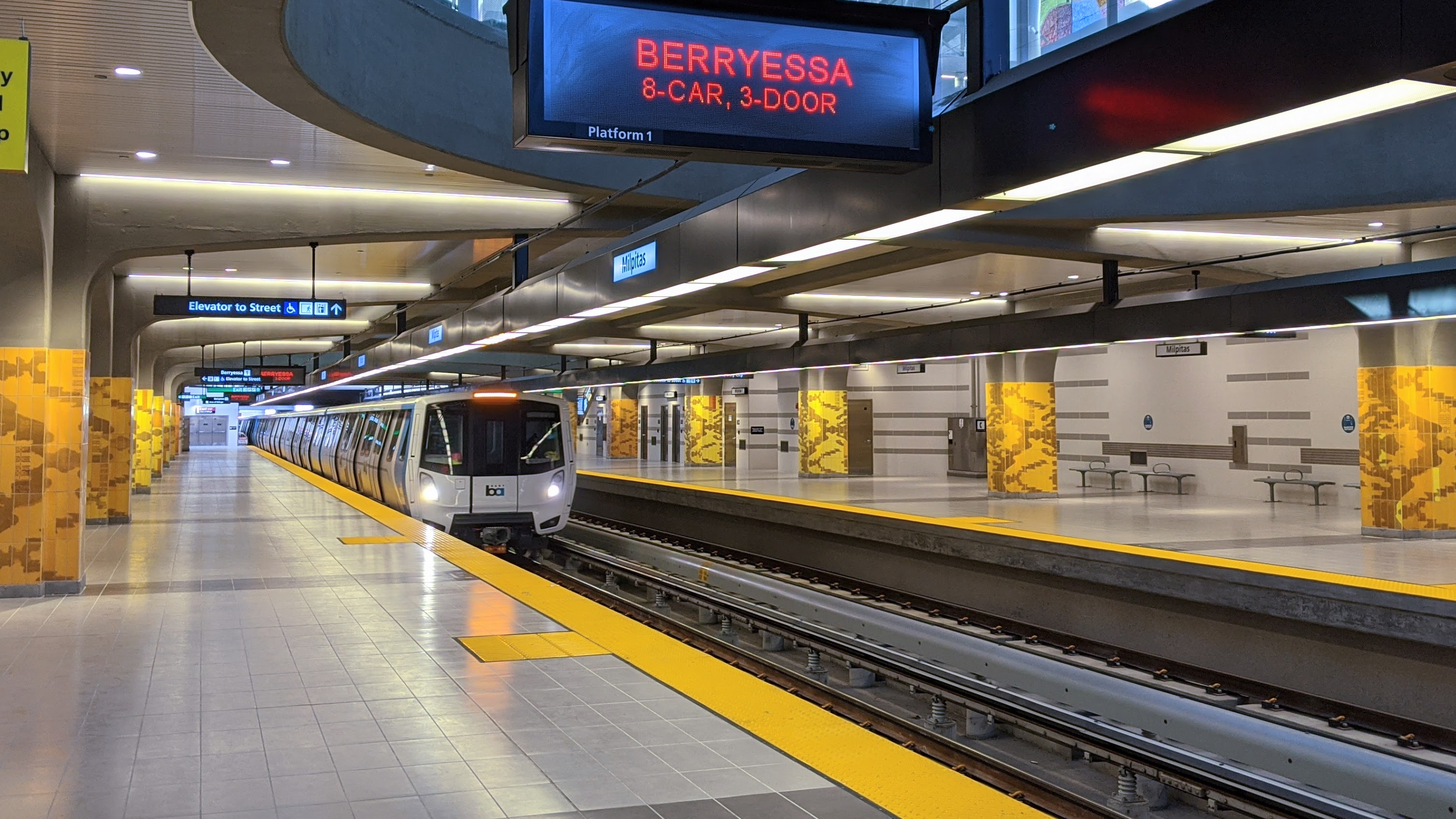
BART station platform

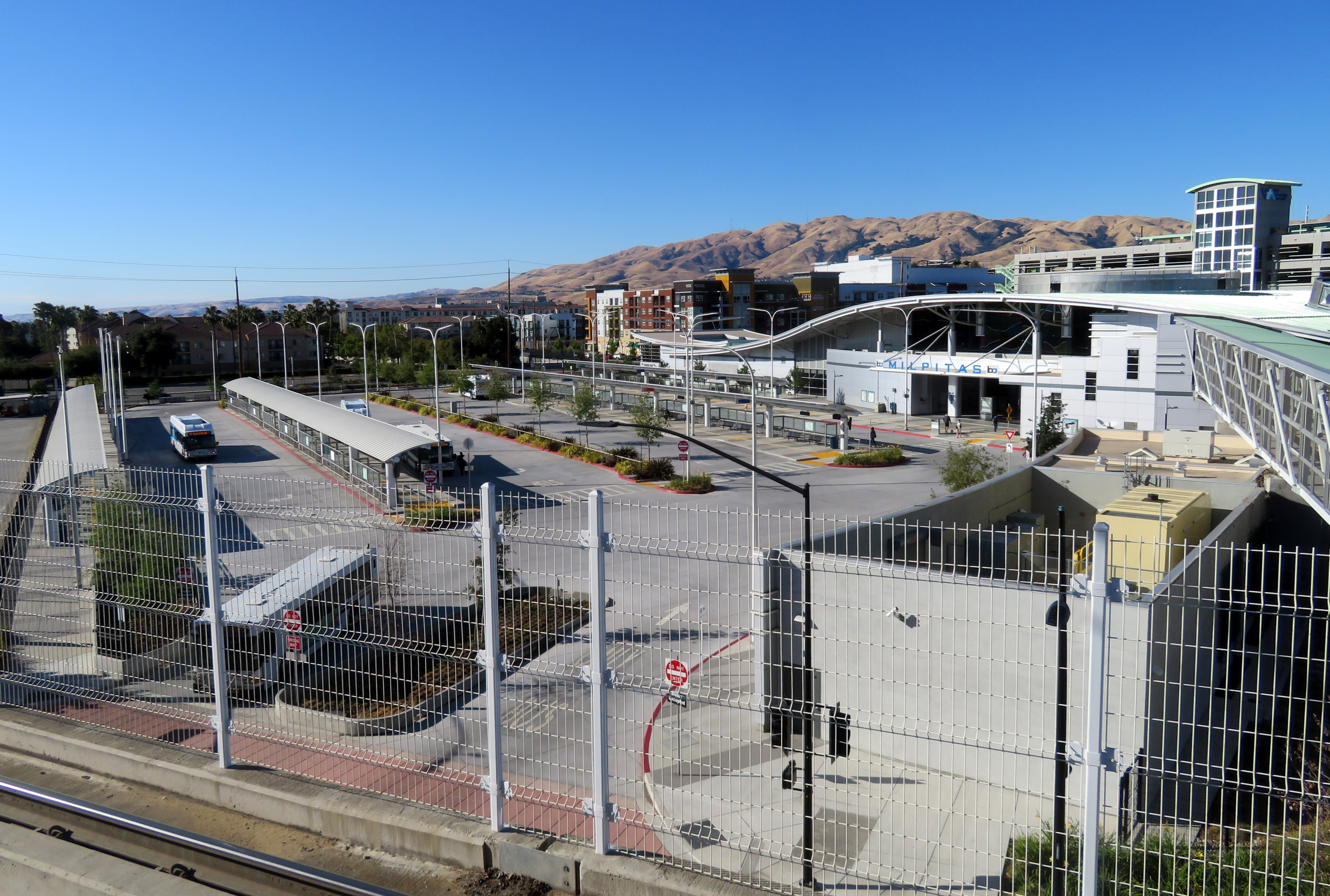
Bus plaza and BART station

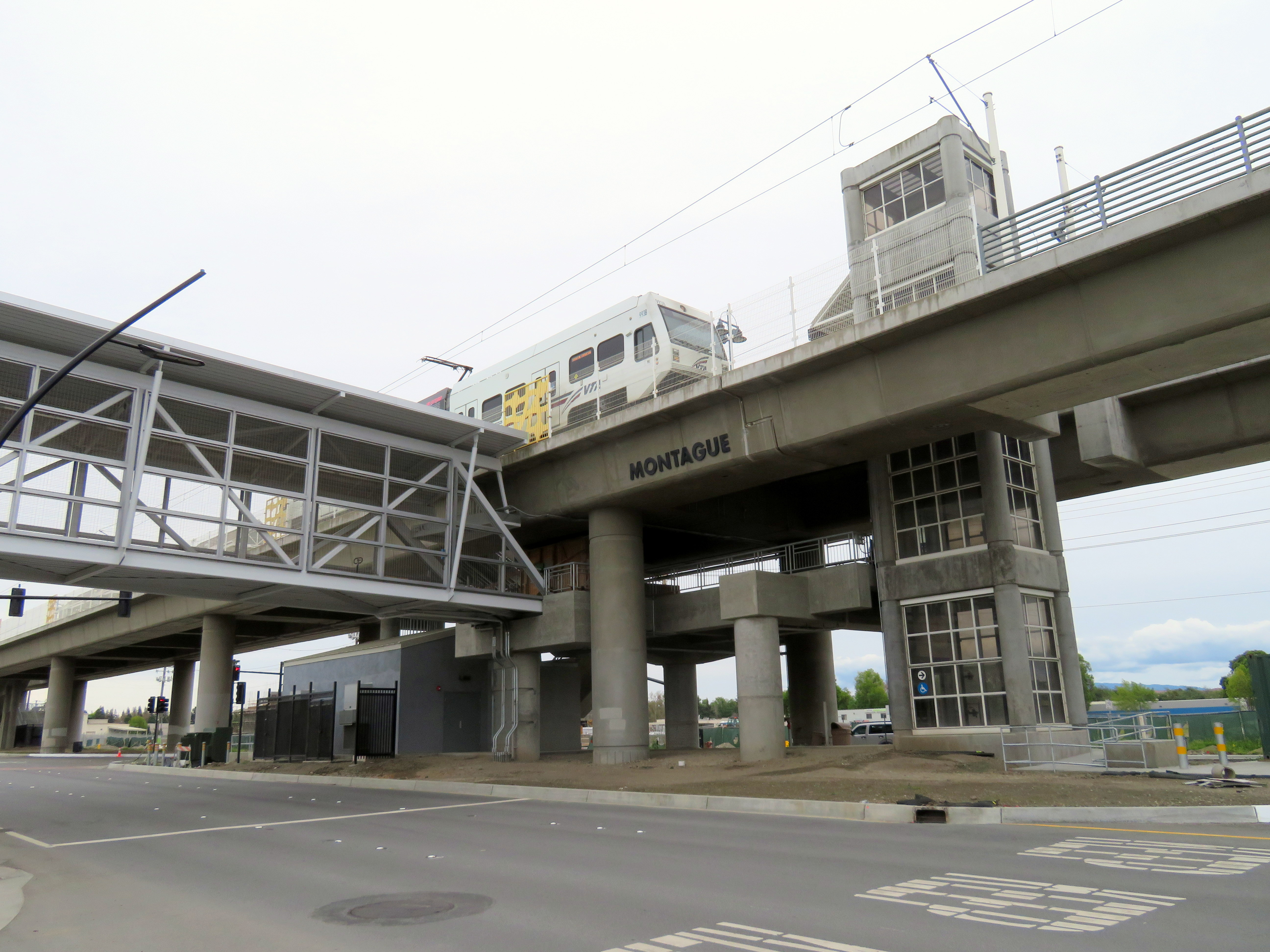
Light rail station from below

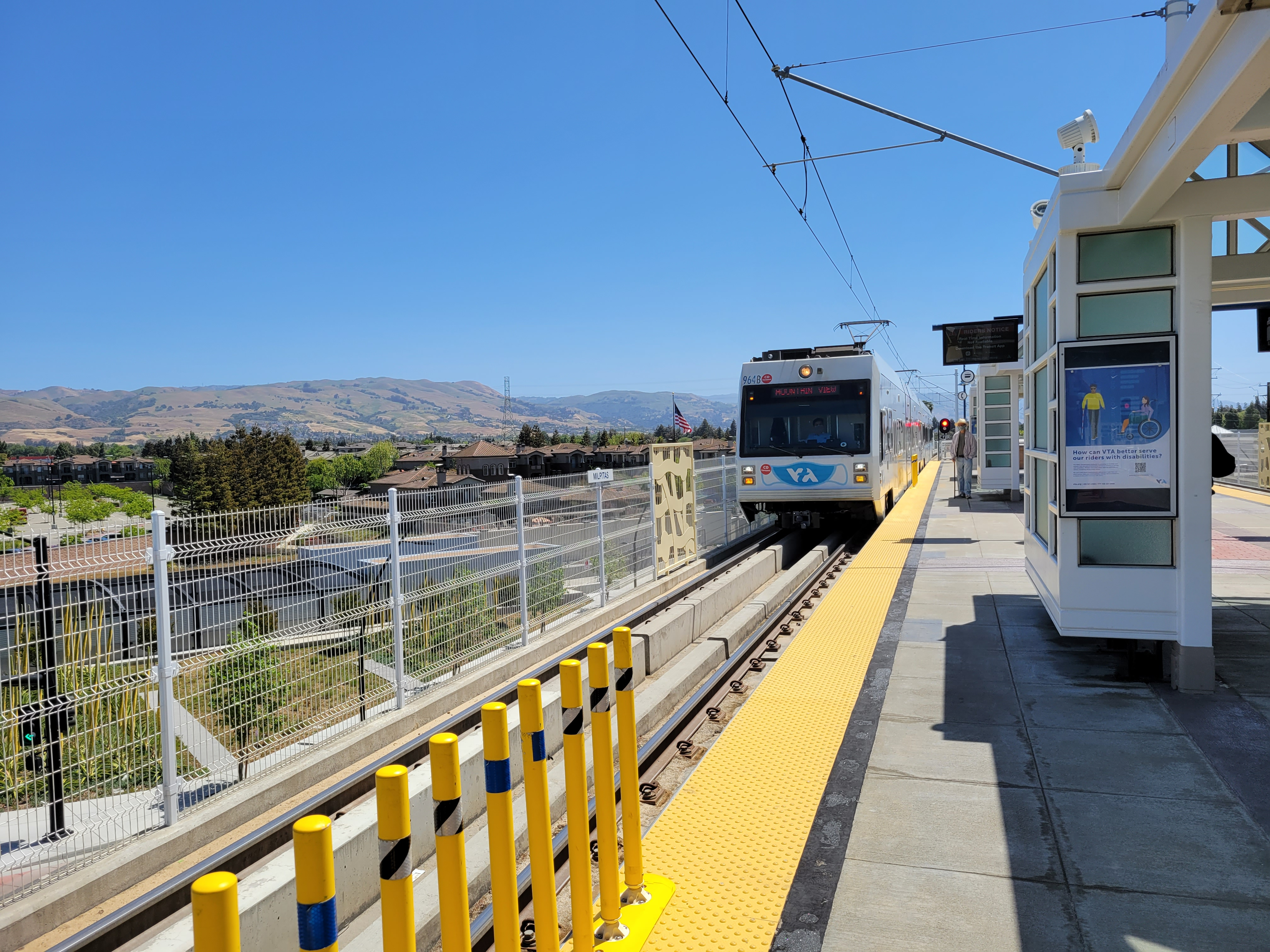
Light rail platform
