= Alum Rock Transit Center =

VTA light rail station in San Jose, California

Alum Rock
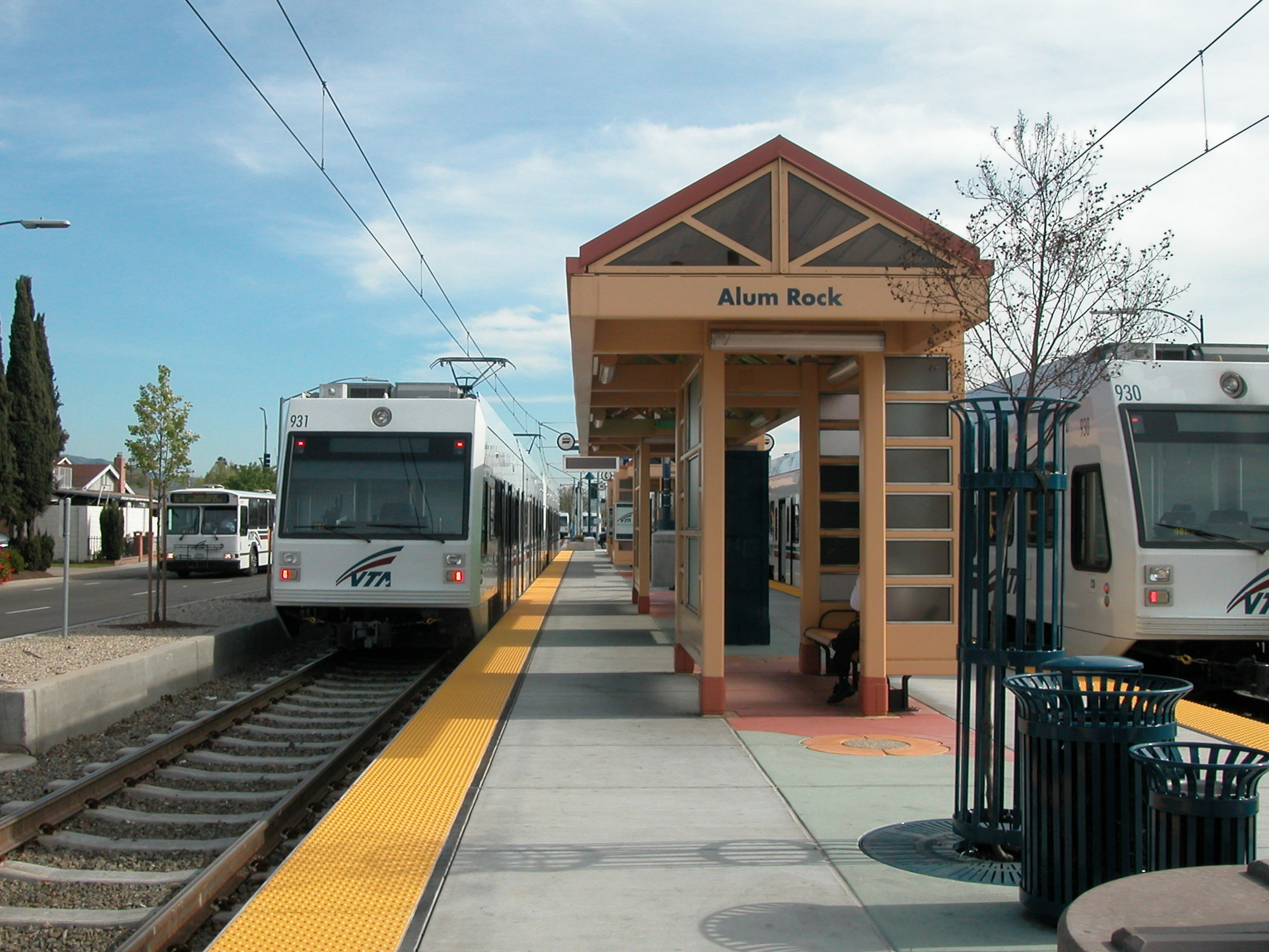
- A VTA bus and two trains at Alum Rock, 2005

General information
- Other names: Alum Rock Transit Center; Alum Rock station
- Location: Capitol Avenue and Nuestra Castillo Court; San Jose, California
- Coordinates: 37°21′30″N 121°49′56″W
- Owner: Santa Clara Valley Transportation Authority
- Line: Tasman East/Capitol
- Platforms: 1 island platform
- Tracks: 2
- Connections: VTA Bus: 23, 25, Rapid 522

Construction
- Structure type: At-grade
- Parking: 110 spaces
- Cycle facilities: Racks and lockers
- Accessible: Yes

History
- Opened: June 24, 2004; 22 years ago

Services
| Preceding station | VTA | Following station |
|---|---|---|
| McKee toward Mountain View | Orange Line | Terminus |
Future service
| Preceding station | VTA | Following station |
|---|---|---|
| McKee toward Mountain View | Orange Line | Story toward Eastridge Transit Center |
Location

Alum Rock Transit Center (or simply Alum Rock station) is an at-grade intermodal transit center located at the intersection of South Capitol Avenue and Nuestra Castillo Court in the Alum Rock district of San Jose, California. The light rail station is located in the center median of South Capitol Avenue and is the current eastern terminus for the Orange Line of the VTA light rail system. VTA buses serve the transit center both on South Capitol Avenue and in a nearby bus plaza located adjacent to the light rail station.

The transit center is the transfer point between the Orange Line and VTA's Rapid 522 bus rapid transit route which offers service south to the Eastridge Transit Center or west to Downtown San Jose, San Jose Diridon station, and the Palo Alto Transit Center.

== See also ==
- Alum Rock, California
