= List of VTA light rail stations =

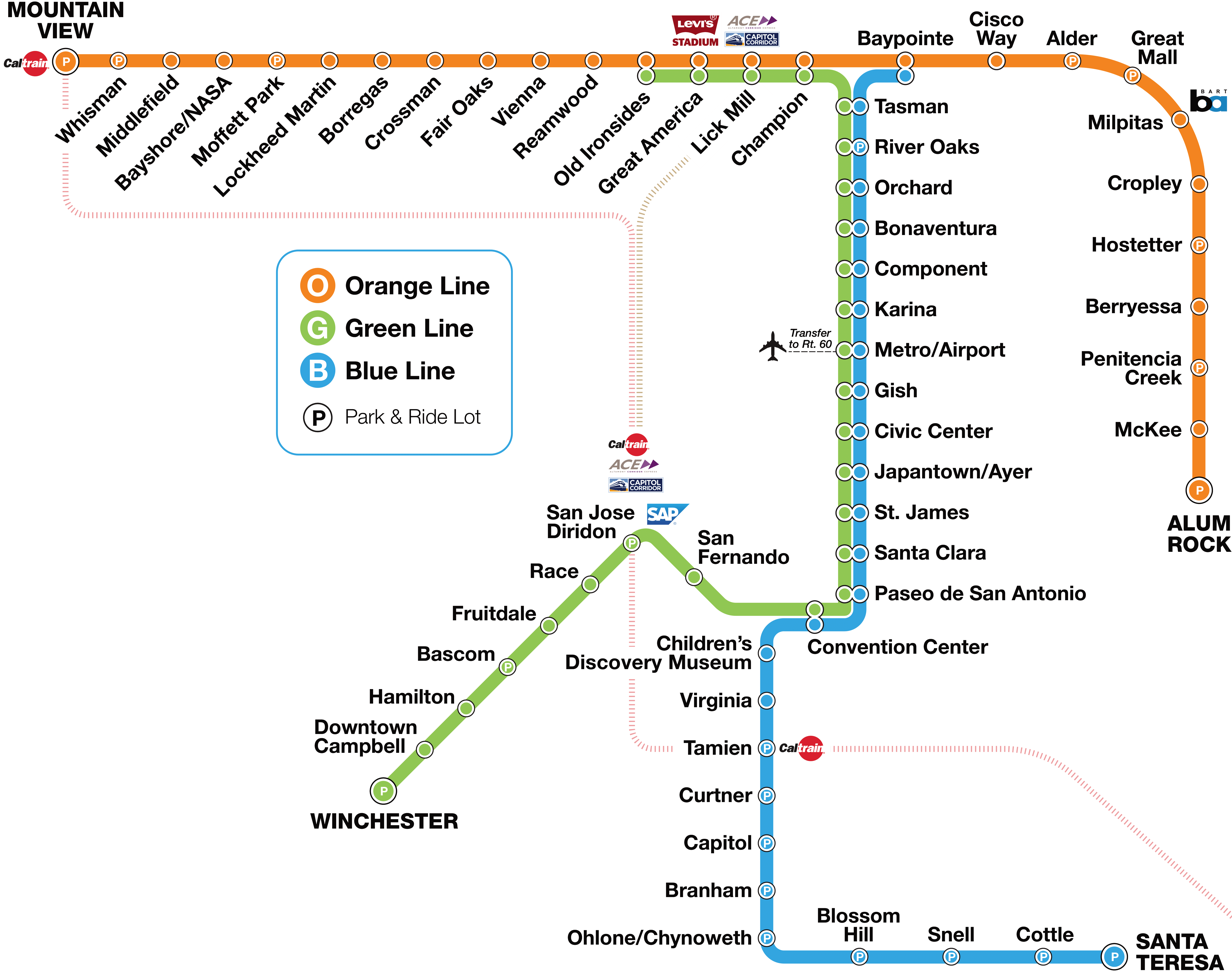
Map of the VTA light rail system as of October 31, 2022

VTA light rail is a light rail transit system that serves the Santa Clara County in the U.S. state of California. The system has 42.2 miles (67.9 km) of tracks and is operated by the Santa Clara Valley Transportation Authority (VTA), which oversees public transit services in the county. The system serves over 32,000 passengers a day as of fiscal year 2007.

The initial segment of the VTA light rail between the Civic Center and Old Ironsides stations began service on December 11, 1987. In 1988 and 1990, the system was extended south of Civic Center to Downtown San Jose and Tamien station. Another 9.7 miles (15.6 km) segment to Santa Teresa and Almaden stations was added to the system in April 1991, completing the entire Guadalupe section. In December 1999, the system underwent another extension with the completion of the Tasman West section and began services to Mountain View. The system was extended to I-880/Milpitas in 2001 and to Hostetter station in 2004 as part of the Tasman East extension. In the same year, the Capitol extension to Alum Rock station was also finished. The latest section, the Vasona extension, was completed in 2005, connecting Campbell to Downtown San Jose.

As of December 2019 the system consists of 59 stations. The majority of stations, 39, are located in San Jose. Seven stations are in Sunnyvale and four are in Mountain View. Campbell, Milpitas, and Santa Clara each have three stations.

VTA closed Evelyn station on March 16, 2015, in order to build a second track between Mountain View and Whisman stations.

== Stations ==
^	Transfer stations
Transfer to other system	Transfer stations with other rail systems
†	Line termini
^†	Transfer stations/Line termini
†	Transfer stations with other rail systems/Line termini

Station^{[a]}	Image	Line(s)^{[b]}	Transfers	Location	Opened	Parking spaces
Alder	A view outside the entrance to Alder station	Orange Line (VTA)		Milpitas	May 17, 2001	275
Alum Rock†	Two trains at Alum Rock station	Orange Line (VTA)		San Jose	June 24, 2004	110
Bascom	The platform at Bascom station	Green Line (VTA)		San Jose	October 1, 2005	102
Baypointe^†	The platforms at Baypointe station	Blue Line (VTA) Orange Line (VTA)		San Jose	December 20, 1999	
Bayshore/NASA	Bayshore/NASA station with remains of Hangar One in background	Orange Line (VTA)		Mountain View	December 20, 1999	
Berryessa	A southbound train at Berryessa station	Orange Line (VTA)		San Jose	June 24, 2004	
Blossom Hill	The platform at Blossom Hill station	Blue Line (VTA)		San Jose	April 25, 1991	511
Bonaventura	The platform at Bonaventura station	Blue Line (VTA) Green Line (VTA)		San Jose	December 11, 1987	
Borregas	Looking west along the southbound platform at Borregas station	Orange Line (VTA)		Sunnyvale	December 20, 1999	
Branham	The platform at Branham station	Blue Line (VTA)		San Jose	April 25, 1991	271
Capitol	A train at Capitol station	Blue Line (VTA)		San Jose	April 25, 1991	951
Champion	The platform at Champion station	Green Line (VTA) Orange Line (VTA)		San Jose	March 24, 1997	
Children's Discovery Museum	The platform at Children's Discovery Museum station	Blue Line (VTA)		San Jose	August 17, 1990	
Cisco Way	The platform at Cisco Way station	Orange Line (VTA)		San Jose	May 17, 2001	
Civic Center	A train waits at Civic Center station	Blue Line (VTA) Green Line (VTA)		San Jose	December 11, 1987	
Component	The platform at Component station	Blue Line (VTA) Green Line (VTA)		San Jose	December 11, 1987	
Convention Center^	A view of Convention Center station with the San Jose Civic auditorium in the background	Blue Line (VTA) Green Line (VTA)		San Jose	June 17, 1988	
Cottle	The platform at Cottle station	Blue Line (VTA)		San Jose	April 25, 1991	421
Cropley	The platform at Cropley station	Orange Line (VTA)		San Jose	June 24, 2004	
Crossman	The platform at Crossman station	Orange Line (VTA)		Sunnyvale	December 20, 1999	
Curtner	The platform at Curtner station	Blue Line (VTA)		San Jose	April 25, 1991	474
Downtown Campbell	The platform at Downtown Campbell station	Green Line (VTA)		Campbell	October 1, 2005	
Fair Oaks	A train at Fair Oaks station	Orange Line (VTA)		Sunnyvale	December 20, 1999	
Fruitdale	The platform of the Fruitdale station	Green Line (VTA)		San Jose	October 1, 2005	
Gish	A train waiting at Gish station	Blue Line (VTA) Green Line (VTA)		San Jose	December 11, 1987	
Great America	A train near Great America station	Green Line (VTA) Orange Line (VTA)		Santa Clara	December 11, 1987	93
Great Mall	A train at Great Mall station	Orange Line (VTA)		Milpitas	June 24, 2004	
Hamilton	The platform of the Hamilton station	Green Line (VTA)		Campbell	October 1, 2005	
Hostetter	A view of Hostetter station	Orange Line (VTA)		San Jose	June 24, 2004	100
Japantown/Ayer	A train at Japantown/Ayer station	Blue Line (VTA) Green Line (VTA)		San Jose	June 17, 1988	
Karina	A train at Karina station	Blue Line (VTA) Green Line (VTA)		San Jose	December 11, 1987	
Lick Mill	The platform at Lick Mill station	Green Line (VTA) Orange Line (VTA)	Amtrak: Capitol Corridor (at Santa Clara–Great America station); Altamont Corridor Express (at Santa Clara–Great America station)	Santa Clara	December 11, 1987	
Lockheed Martin	The platform at Lockheed Martin station	Orange Line (VTA)		Sunnyvale	December 20, 1999	
McKee	The platform at McKee station	Orange Line (VTA)		San Jose	June 24, 2004	
Metro/Airport	The platform at Metro/Airport station	Blue Line (VTA) Green Line (VTA)		San Jose	December 11, 1987	
Middlefield	The platform at Middlefield station	Orange Line (VTA)		Mountain View	December 20, 1999	
Milpitas	A train at Milpitas station	Orange Line (VTA)	BART:	Milpitas	June 24, 2004	
Moffett Park	A train at Moffett Park station	Orange Line (VTA)		Sunnyvale	December 20, 1999	93
Mountain View†	View of the Centennial Plaza in the foreground and the Mountain View station in the background	Orange Line (VTA)	Caltrain: Express, Local, Limited, Weekend Local	Mountain View	December 20, 1999	
Ohlone/Chynoweth	A train at Ohlone/Chynoweth station	Blue Line (VTA)		San Jose	April 25, 1991	549
Old Ironsides^†	The platform at Old Ironsides station	Green Line (VTA) Orange Line (VTA)		Santa Clara	December 11, 1987	
Orchard	A view of Orchard station from across the intersection of North 1st Street and Orchard Parkway	Blue Line (VTA) Green Line (VTA)		San Jose	December 11, 1987	
Paseo de San Antonio	A train at Paseo de San Antonio station	Blue Line (VTA) Green Line (VTA)		San Jose	June 17, 1988	
Penitencia Creek	A train at Penitencia Creek station	Orange Line (VTA)		San Jose	June 24, 2004	53
Race	The platform at Race station	Green Line (VTA)		San Jose	October 1, 2005	
Reamwood	Reamwood station, 2012	Orange Line (VTA)		Sunnyvale	December 20, 1999	
River Oaks	The platform at River Oaks station	Blue Line (VTA) Green Line (VTA)		San Jose	December 11, 1987	22
San Jose Diridon	The platform at San Jose Diridon station	Green Line (VTA)	Amtrak: Capitol Corridor, Coast Starlight; Caltrain: Express, Local, Limited, Weekend Local, South County Connector; Altamont Corridor Express	San Jose	August 1, 2005	
San Fernando	The platforms at San Fernando station	Green Line (VTA)		San Jose	August 1, 2005	
Santa Clara	The platforms at Santa Clara station (VTA)	Blue Line (VTA) Green Line (VTA)		San Jose	June 17, 1988	
Santa Teresa†	A train at Santa Teresa station	Blue Line (VTA)		San Jose	April 25, 1991	1,155
Snell	The platform at Snell station	Blue Line (VTA)		San Jose	April 25, 1991	430
St. James	The southbound platform at Saint James station	Blue Line (VTA) Green Line (VTA)		San Jose	June 17, 1988	
Tamien	A train at Tamien station	Blue Line (VTA)	Caltrain: Local (limited service), Weekend Local (limited service), South County Connector	San Jose	August 17, 1990	275
Tasman	The platform at Tasman station	Blue Line (VTA) Green Line (VTA)		San Jose	December 11, 1987	
Vienna	The platform at Vienna station	Orange Line (VTA)		Sunnyvale	December 20, 1999	
Virginia	A train at Virginia station	Blue Line (VTA)		San Jose	August 17, 1990	
Whisman	The platform at Whisman station	Orange Line (VTA)		Mountain View	December 20, 1999	52
Winchester†	A train at Winchester station	Green Line (VTA)		Campbell	October 1, 2005	54

== Former stations ==
Station^{[a]}	Image	Location	Opened	Closed
Almaden†	A train at Almaden station, 2012	San Jose	April 25, 1991	December 27, 2019
Evelyn	The platform at Evelyn station, 2015	Mountain View	December 20, 1999	March 16, 2015
Oakridge	The platform at Oakridge station, 2012	San Jose	April 25, 1991	December 27, 2019

== Notes ==
^{a} All station names are based on the official system map.
^{b} For stations serviced by multiple lines, lines are listed in the order of opening.
^{c} This station's northbound and southbound platforms are located a block apart from each other. The northbound platform is located on 1st Street while the southbound platform is located on 2nd Street.
