= Gish station =

VTA light rail station in San Jose, California

Gish
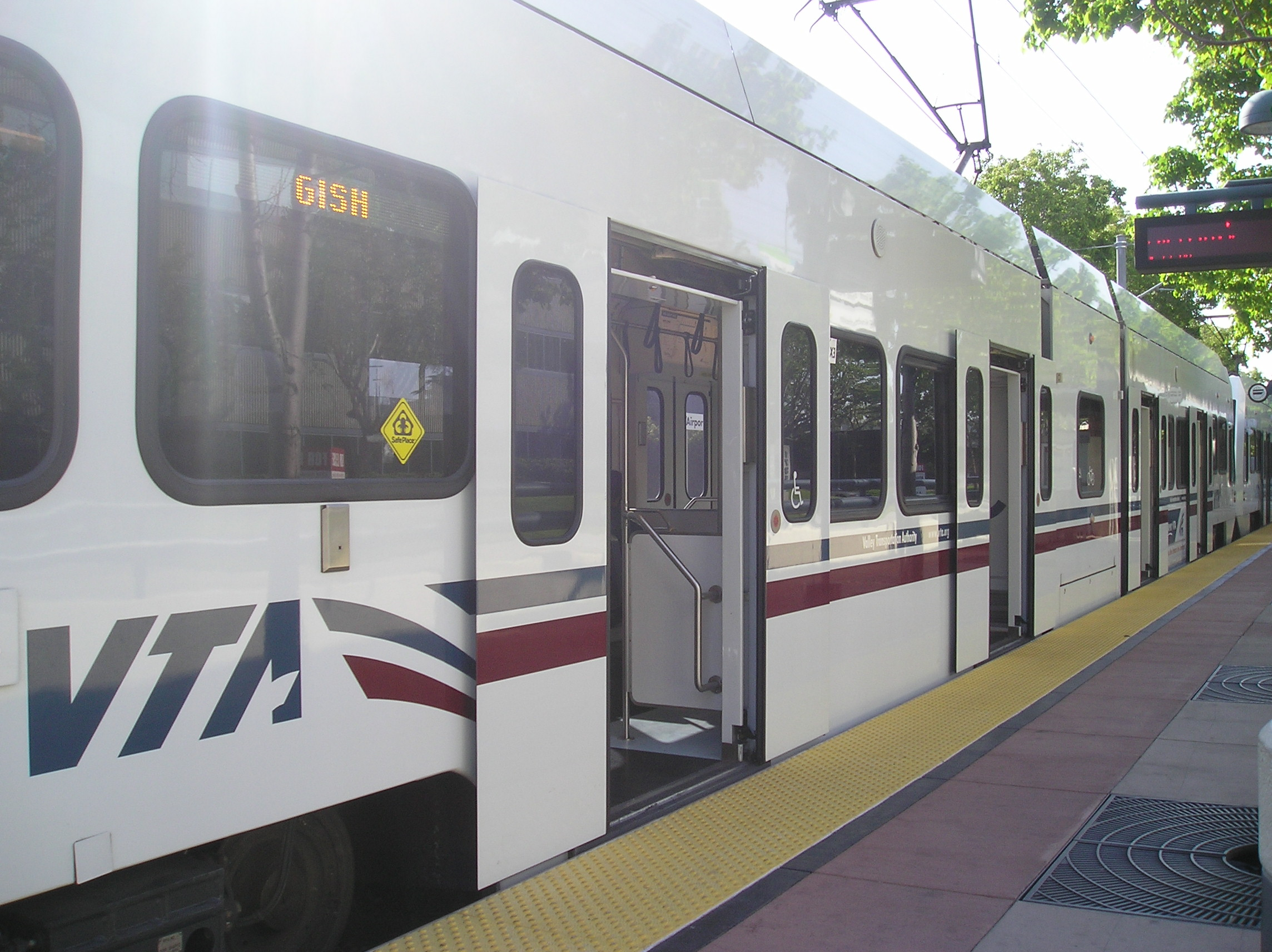
- VTA train at Gish Station

General information
- Location: 1st Street and Gish Road; San Jose, California
- Coordinates: 37°21′42″N 121°54′35″W
- Owner: Santa Clara Valley Transportation Authority
- Line: Guadalupe Phase 1
- Platforms: 1 island platform
- Tracks: 2

Construction
- Accessible: Yes

History
- Opened: December 11, 1987; 38 years ago

Services
Preceding station	VTA	Following station
Metro/Airport toward Baypointe	Blue Line	Civic Center toward Santa Teresa
Metro/Airport toward Old Ironsides	Green Line	Civic Center toward Winchester
Location

Gish station is a light rail station operated by Santa Clara Valley Transportation Authority. The station is located in San Jose, California, United States in the center median of 1st Street near Gish Road. The station has a split platform. The northbound platform is located just north of Gish Road, while the southbound platform is located just south of it. This station is served by the Blue and Green lines of the VTA light rail system.
