= Karina station =

VTA light rail station in San Jose, California

Karina
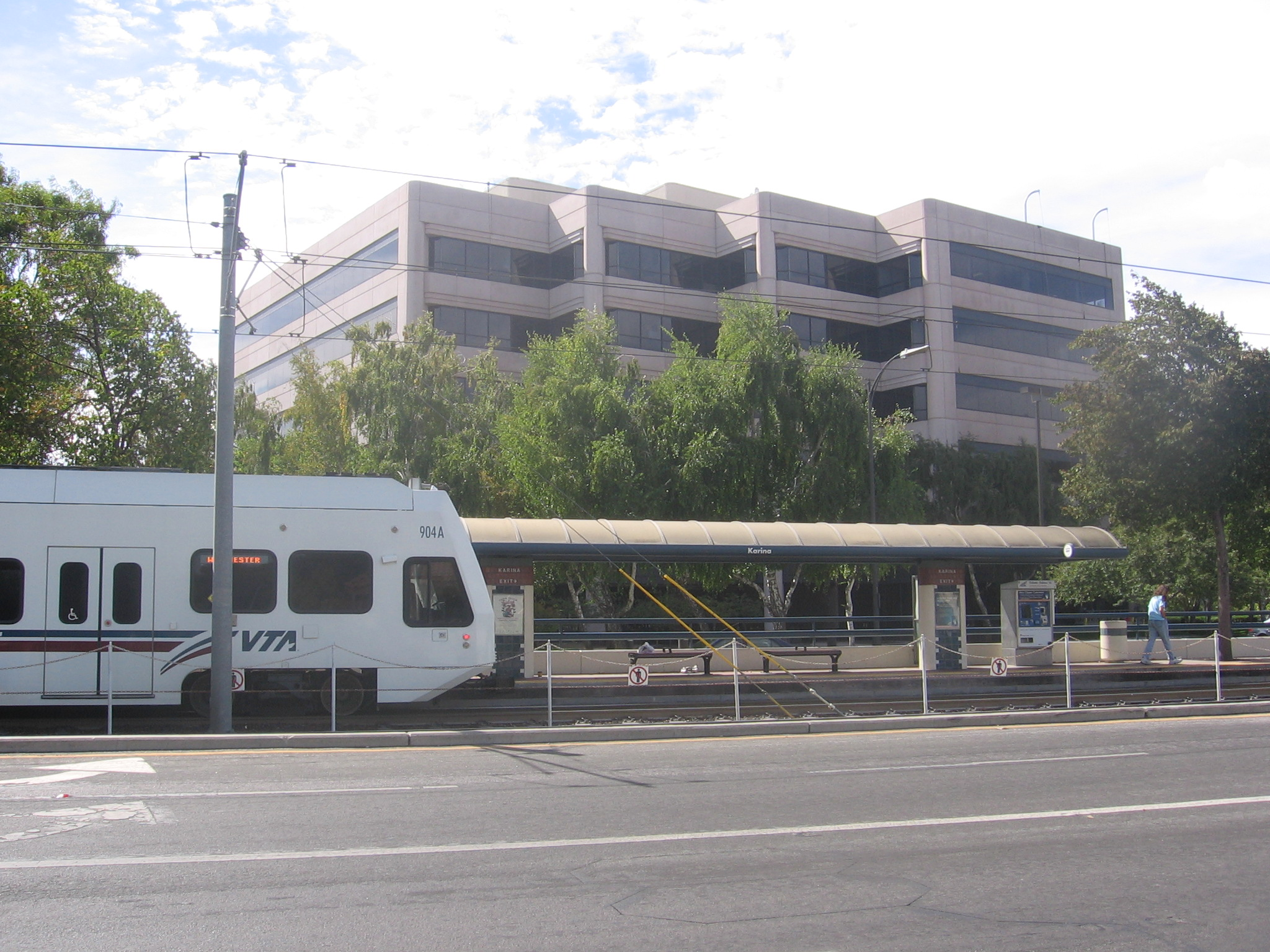
- VTA train at Karina station

General information
- Location: 1st Street and Karina Court; San Jose, California
- Coordinates: 37°22′31″N 121°55′11″W
- Owner: Santa Clara Valley Transportation Authority
- Line: Guadalupe Phase 1
- Platforms: 2 side platforms
- Tracks: 2

Construction
- Accessible: Yes

History
- Opened: December 11, 1987

Services
Preceding station	VTA	Following station
Component toward Baypointe	Blue Line	Metro/Airport toward Santa Teresa
Component toward Old Ironsides	Green Line	Metro/Airport toward Winchester
Location

Karina station is a light rail station operated by Santa Clara Valley Transportation Authority. The station is located in San Jose, California in the center median of 1st Street near Karina Court. The station's street address is 1900 N. First Street.

Karina has a split platform. The northbound platform is located just north of Karina Court, the southbound platform is located just south of Karina Court. This station is served by the Blue and Green lines of the VTA light rail system.
