= Component station =

VTA light rail station in San Jose, California

Component
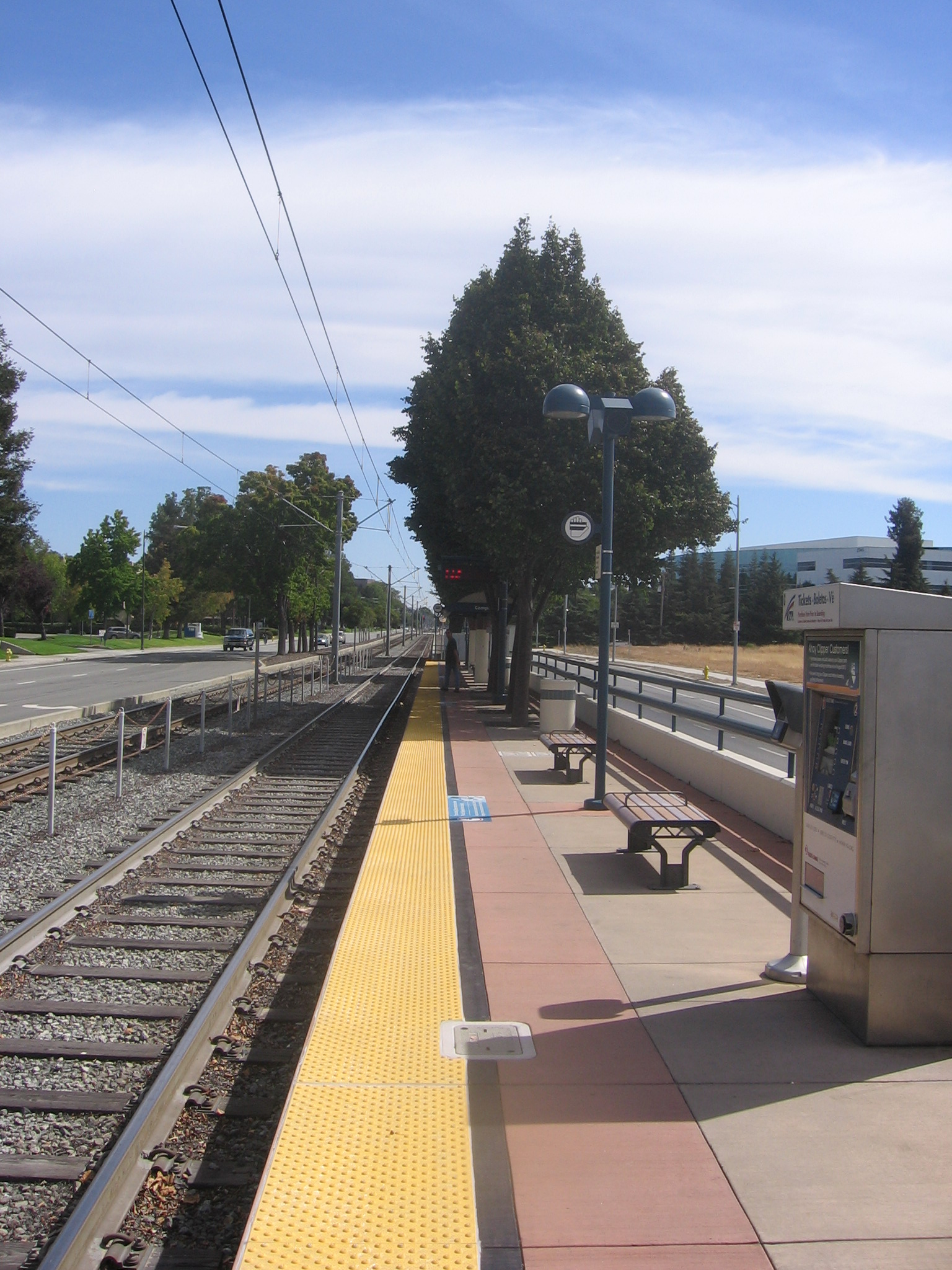
- Component station platform in 2012

General information
- Location: 1st Street and Component Drive; San Jose, California
- Coordinates: 37°22′58″N 121°55′31″W
- Owner: Santa Clara Valley Transportation Authority
- Line: Guadalupe Phase 1
- Platforms: 2 side platforms
- Tracks: 2

Construction
- Accessible: Yes

History
- Opened: December 11, 1987

Services
Preceding station	VTA	Following station
Bonaventura toward Baypointe	Blue Line	Karina toward Santa Teresa
Bonaventura toward Old Ironsides	Green Line	Karina toward Winchester
Location

Component station is a light rail station operated by Santa Clara Valley Transportation Authority. The station is located in San Jose, California in the center median of 1st Street near Component Drive. The station's street address is 2540 North First Street.

Component station has a split platform. The northbound platform is located just north of Component Drive, the southbound platform is located just south of Component Drive. This station is served by the Blue and Green lines of the VTA light rail system.
