= Race Street station =

VTA light rail station in San Jose, California

Race
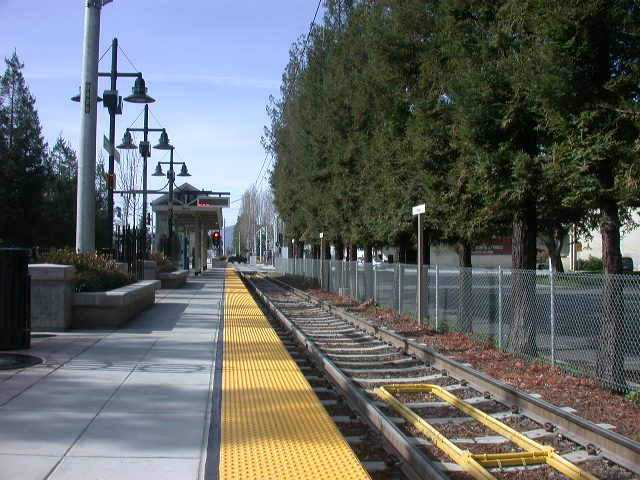
- Race station platform

General information
- Location: 580 Race Street; San Jose, California
- Coordinates: 37°19′03″N 121°54′37″W
- Owner: Santa Clara Valley Transportation Authority
- Platforms: 1 side platform
- Tracks: 1

Construction
- Accessible: Yes

History
- Opened: October 1, 2005

Services
Preceding station	VTA	Following station
San Jose Diridon toward Old Ironsides	Green Line	Fruitdale toward Winchester
Location

Race station, sometimes listed as Race Street, is a light rail station operated by Santa Clara Valley Transportation Authority (VTA). It is located near the intersection of Race Street and Parkmoor Avenue in San Jose, California. The station consists of a single platform with a single trackway, and trains from both directions arrive on the same track. Race station is served by the Green Line of the VTA light rail system.

== History ==
Race station was built as part of the Vasona Light Rail extension project. This project extended VTA light rail service from the intersection of Woz Way and West San Carlos Street in San Jose in a southwesterly direction to the Winchester station in western Campbell.

The official opening date for this station was October 1, 2005.

The construction of this station and the rest of the Vasona Light Rail extension was part of the 1996 Measure B Transportation Improvement Program. Santa Clara County voters approved the Measure B project in 1996 along with a half-percent sales tax increase. The Vasona Light Rail extension was funded mostly by the resulting sales tax revenues with additional money coming from federal and state funding, grants, VTA bond revenues, and municipal contributions.
