= Bonaventura station =

Light rail station in San Jose, California

Bonaventura
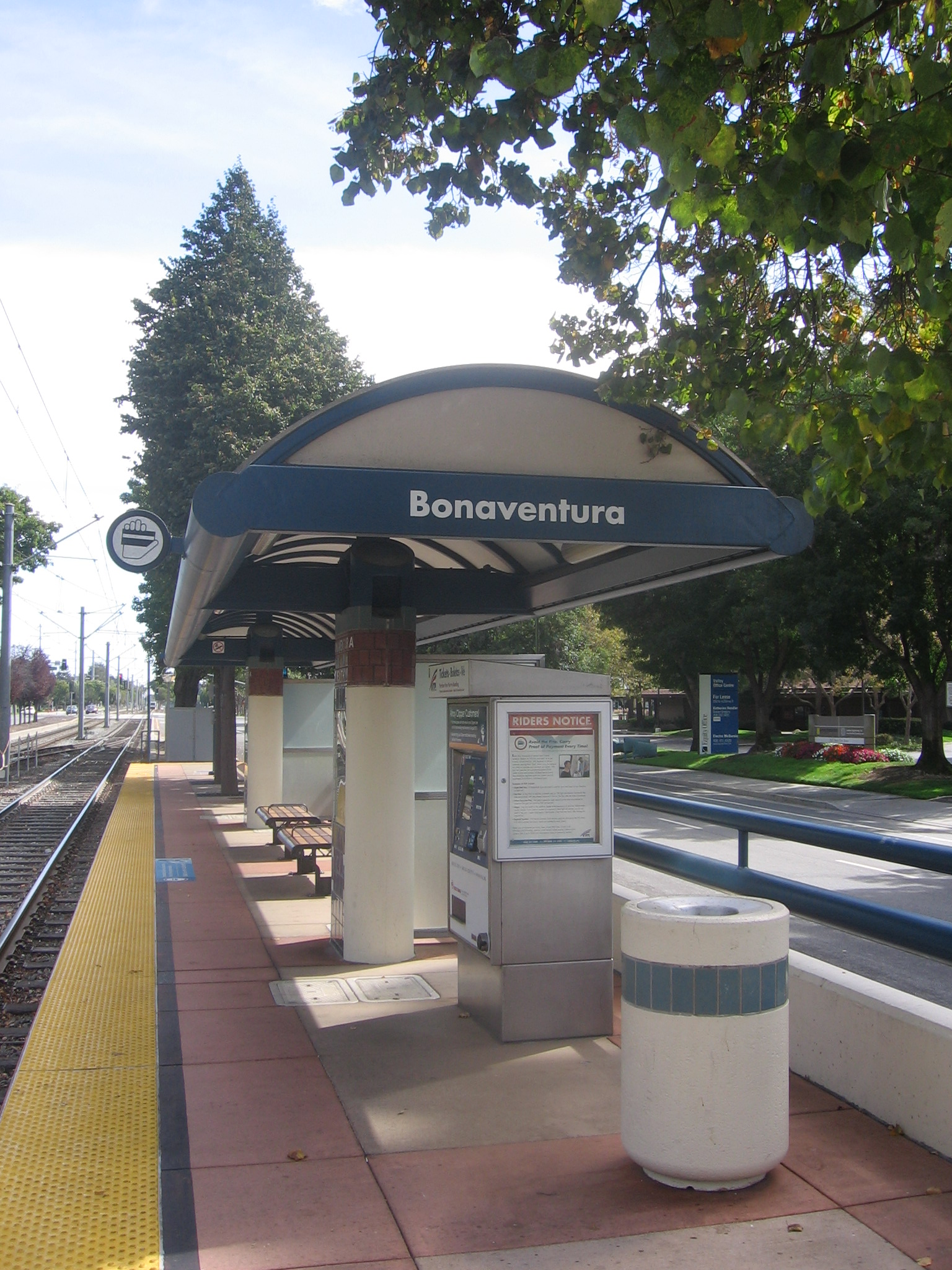
- Bonaventura station platform in 2012

General information
- Location: 1st Street and Bonaventura Drive; San Jose, California
- Coordinates: 37°23′17″N 121°55′45″W
- Owner: Santa Clara Valley Transportation Authority
- Line: Guadalupe Phase 1
- Platforms: 2 side platforms
- Tracks: 2
- Connections: VTA Bus: 20

Construction
- Structure type: At-grade
- Accessible: Yes

History
- Opened: December 11, 1987; 38 years ago

Services
Preceding station	VTA	Following station
Orchard toward Baypointe	Blue Line	Component toward Santa Teresa
Orchard toward Old Ironsides	Green Line	Component toward Winchester
Location

Bonaventura station is an at-grade light rail station located in the center median of First Street at its intersection with Bonaventura Drive, after which the station is named, in San Jose, California. The station is owned by Santa Clara Valley Transportation Authority (VTA) and is served by the Blue Line and the Green Line of the VTA light rail system.

== Services ==
=== Platform layout ===
Bonaventura has a split platform with the northbound platform north of Bonaventura Drive and the southbound platform just to the south.
