= Orchard station (VTA) =

VTA light rail station in San Jose, California

Orchard
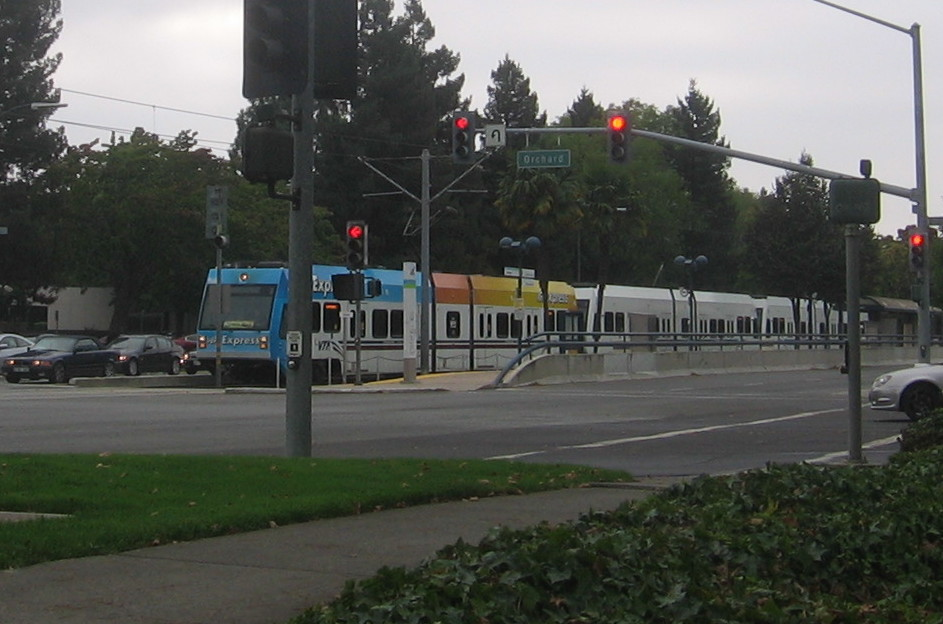
- Orchard station as seen from across North First Street

General information
- Location: 3060 North First Street; San Jose, California
- Coordinates: 37°23′41″N 121°56′04″W
- Owner: Santa Clara Valley Transportation Authority
- Line: Guadalupe Phase 1
- Platforms: 2 side platforms
- Tracks: 2
- Connections: VTA Bus: 20

Construction
- Structure type: At-grade
- Accessible: Yes

History
- Opened: December 11, 1987; 38 years ago

Services
Preceding station	VTA	Following station
River Oaks toward Baypointe	Blue Line	Bonaventura toward Santa Teresa
River Oaks toward Old Ironsides	Green Line	Bonaventura toward Winchester
Location

Orchard station is an at-grade light rail station located in the center median of First Street at its intersection with Orchard Parkway, after which the station is named, in San Jose, California. The station is owned by Santa Clara Valley Transportation Authority (VTA) and is served by the Blue Line and the Green Line of the VTA light rail system.

== Services ==
=== Platform layout ===
Orchard has a split platform with the northbound platform north of Orchard Parkway and the southbound platform just to the south.
