= Metro/Airport station =

VTA light rail station in San Jose, California

Metro/Airport
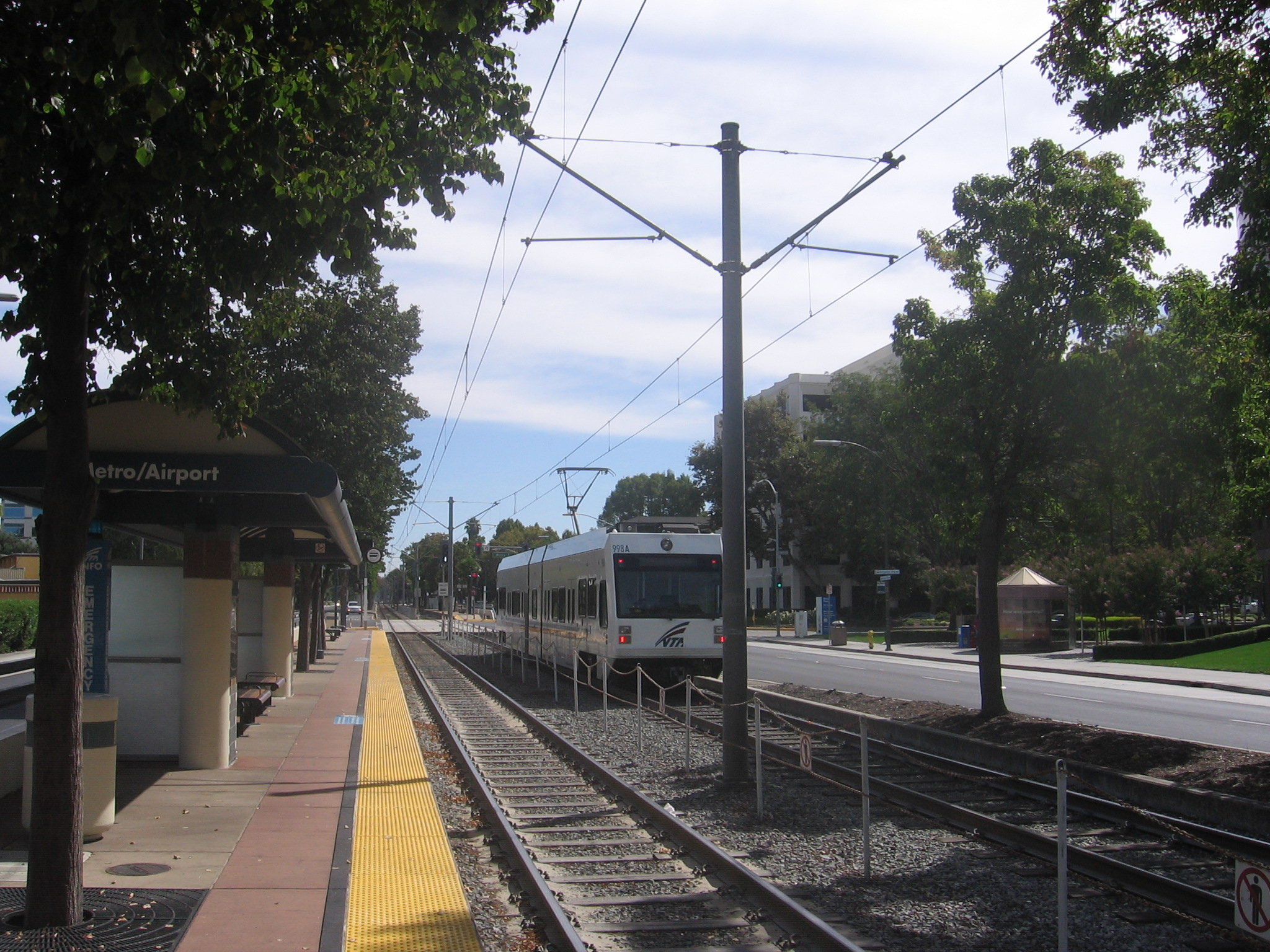
- Metro/Airport station platform in 2012

General information
- Location: 1st Street and Metro Drive; San Jose, California
- Coordinates: 37°22′10″N 121°54′55″W
- Owner: Santa Clara Valley Transportation Authority
- Line: Guadalupe Phase 1
- Platforms: 2 side platforms
- Tracks: 2
- Connections: VTA Bus: 60; San Jose Airport (via VTA Bus 60)

Construction
- Structure type: At-grade
- Accessible: Yes

History
- Opened: December 11, 1987; 38 years ago

Services
Preceding station	VTA	Following station
Karina toward Baypointe	Blue Line	Gish toward Santa Teresa
Karina toward Old Ironsides	Green Line	Gish toward Winchester
Location

Metro/Airport station is a light rail station at First Street and Metro Drive in San Jose, California, United States. This station is served by the Blue and Green lines of the VTA light rail system.

VTA Bus Route 60 connects to the San Jose International Airport from this station.
