= Orchard station =

Orchard station may refer to:

== Singapore ==
- Orchard MRT station, a railway station in Singapore
- Orchard Boulevard MRT station, a railway station in Singapore

== United States ==
- Orchard station (RTD), a light rail station in Denver, Colorado, U.S.
- Orchard station (VTA), a light rail station in San Jose, California, U.S.
