= Green Line (VTA) =

Light rail line in Santa Clara County, California

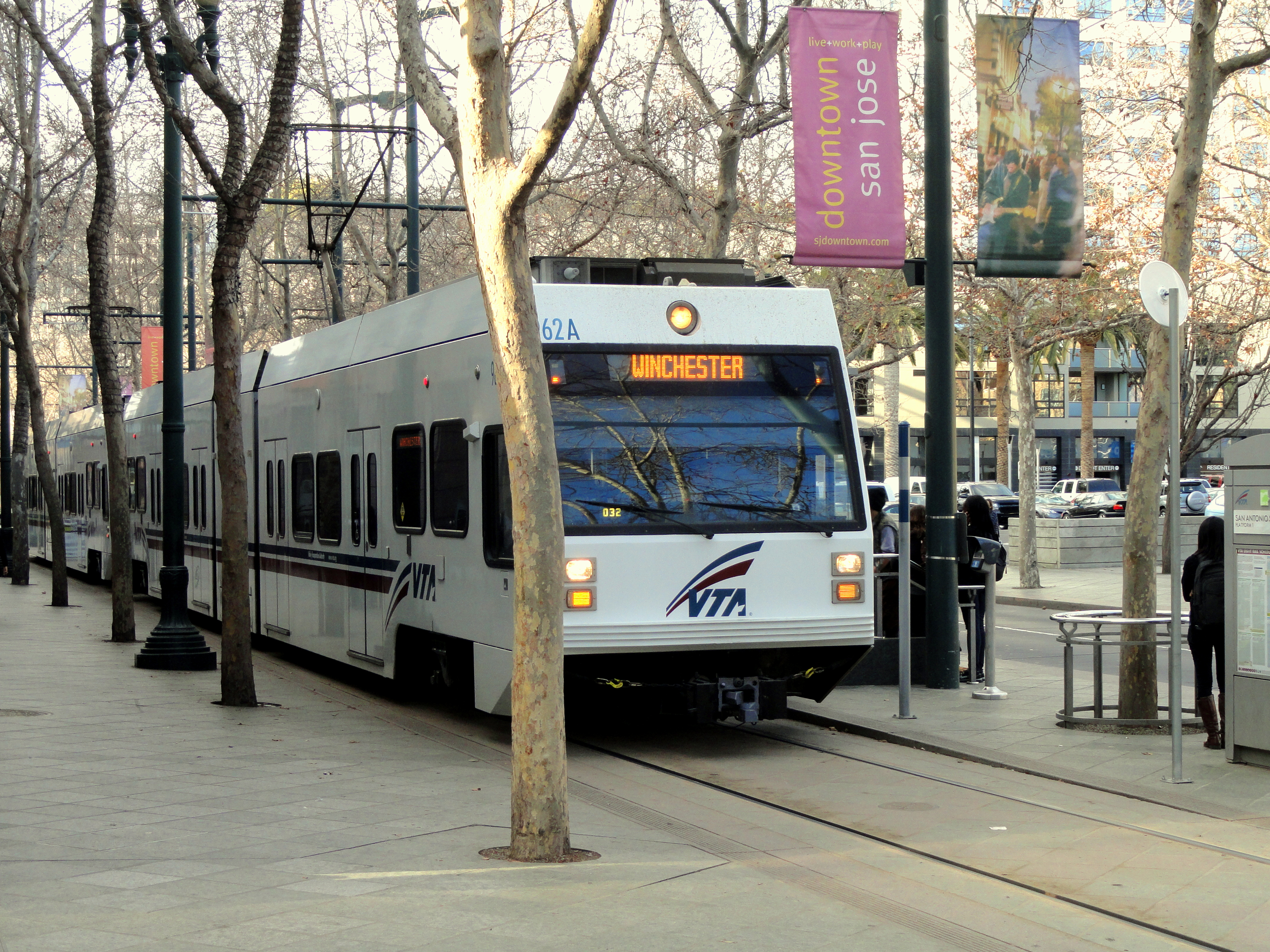
- A Green Line train bound for Winchester station stops at Paseo de San Antonio station along Downtown San Jose's transit mall.

Overview
- Locale: Santa Clara County, California; Cities: Santa Clara, San Jose, and Campbell
- Termini: Old Ironsides; Winchester
- Stations: 26

Service
- Type: Light rail
- System: VTA light rail
- Operator: Valley Transportation Authority
- Rolling stock: Kinki Sharyo LRV

History
- Opened: 1987

Technical
- Line length: 22.3 mi (35.9 km)
- Track gauge: 4 ft 8 1/2 in (1,435 mm) standard gauge
- Electrification: Overhead line, 750 V DC
Route map
Green Line highlighted in green

The Green Line is a light rail line in Santa Clara County, California, and part of the Santa Clara Valley Transportation Authority (VTA) light rail system. It serves 26 stations in the cities of Santa Clara, San Jose, and Campbell, traveling between Old Ironsides and Winchester stations. The line connects Levi's Stadium, San Jose International Airport (via a bus connection), Downtown San Jose, San Jose State University, SAP Center, Diridon station, and Downtown Campbell. It runs for 20 hours per day on weekdays, with headways of 15 minutes for most of the day. On weekends, train run at 20 minute headways for most of the day. After around 8pm on weekdays and weekends trains run at 30 minute headways.

== Route description ==
From south to north, the Green Line starts at Winchester station in Campbell and heads northeast towards downtown San Jose along the former South Pacific Coast Railroad right of way, which is now part of the Union Pacific Permanente branch. The Green Line then curves north to serve San Jose Diridon station, then a brief tunnel and sharp turn to the east to serve San Fernando station. After a couple more sharp turns, the Green line joins the Blue Line to serve Convention Center station. The two lines then head through Downtown and North San Jose via 1st Street until the Green Line separates from the Blue Line at Tasman station and joins the Orange Line heading west, passing Levi's Stadium and the future Related Santa Clara mega-development to its terminus at Old Ironsides station in Santa Clara. The whole route takes approximately one hour.

== Owl service ==
From February 2000 to April 14, 2003, VTA operated all night train service with light rail vehicles (commonly known as "owl service") on a 70-minute frequency between Mountain View and Baypointe. At the time, VTA light rail was the only light rail service in the United States to operate 24 hours a day. The owl service was curtailed in 2003 as a result of mounting deficits.

== Construction history ==
The route that the Mountain View–Winchester line now runs on is constructed in three different expansion projects: the original Guadalupe line, the Tasman West extension, and the Vasona extension.

=== Guadalupe line ===
The trackway between Woz Way in Downtown San Jose and Old Ironsides station is part of the Guadalupe line, the first light rail line constructed in Santa Clara county. The Guadalupe line opened for revenue service on December 11, 1987 originally running from Old Ironsides station to Civic Center station in San Jose. Champion station was not part of the original line; it was added as intermediate stop as part of the Tasman West project.

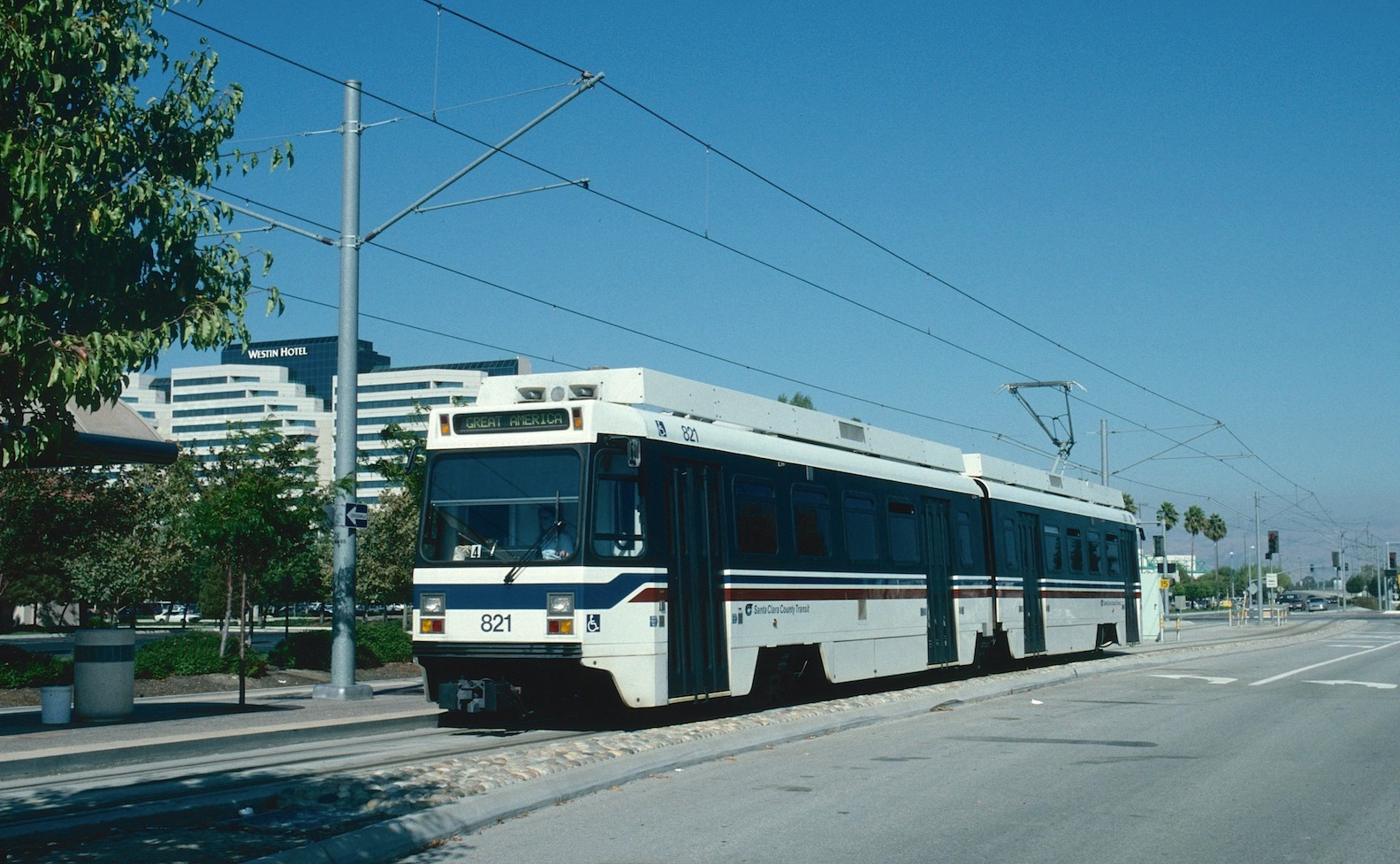
UTDC-built LRV in 1993 arriving at Old Ironsides station, which was the northern terminus of the system's first section of light rail line, opened in 1987

Service on this line was gradually expanded south from Civic Center station as follows:

- Service through the downtown mall and onward to the Convention Center station began on July 17, 1988.
- Service between Convention Center and Tamien stations began on August 17, 1990.
- Service between Tamien and Santa Teresa stations began on April 25, 1991.

=== Tasman West extension ===
The Tasman West extension project added the following features to the line as follows:

- Champion station added as an infill stop along the existing Guadalupe line trackway (Station opened March 24, 1997).
- 7.6 miles (12.2 km) of trackway and 12 new light rail stations added between the existing Old Ironsides station and the new Mountain View station. (Opened December 17, 1999.)
- Baypointe station added just east of the intersection of 1st and Tasman. (Opened December 17, 1999.)

Baypointe station is no longer served by this line due to a line reconfiguration implemented in August 2005.

- After the completion of Tasman West extension and before the completion of Tasman East/Capitol and Vasona extensions, VTA split the light rail system into two main lines: one line running between Baypointe and Mountain View, the other between Baypointe and Santa Teresa. Passengers transferred between the two lines at the new Baypointe station. Tasman is now the transfer station.

Tasman West extension was constructed with funds from 1996 Measure B sales tax measure.

=== Vasona extension ===
Mountain View–Winchester contains the entire Vasona extension from San Fernando station to the southern line terminal, Winchester station, 5.3 miles (8.5 km). Vasona extension opened for revenue service on October 1, 2005. It was originally scheduled to open two months earlier on August 1 but was delayed due to a dispute between Federal Railroad Administration and VTA. At issue was whether a waiver was needed from FRA, since the Union Pacific branchline that parallels most of Vasona extension is still actively used on a tri-weekly basis to serve the Permanente Quarry cement plant in the Cupertino Foothills and a lumber yard in Campbell. A waiver was finally obtained on the condition that all light rail vehicles sound their horns at crossings until "Quiet Zone" improvements are implemented. Freight trains are still required to sound their horns. The Vasona extension was also constructed with funds from 1996 Measure B sales tax measure.

=== Light Rail Efficiency Project ===
In 2014, a new storage track and crossover was constructed between Old Ironsides and Reamwood as part of improvements to support events at Levi's Stadium and the future Silicon Valley BART extension.

To provide better headways and service reliability, a second track was constructed between Whisman and Mountain View. Work began in summer 2014 and was completed in late 2015. Evelyn Station was permanently closed in mid-March 2015 as part of track construction.

=== 2019 reconfiguration ===
Upon the opening of the Silicon Valley BART extension to Berryessa / North San Jose, Line 902 was split into the Green Line (Old Ironsides–Winchester) and the Orange Line (Mountain View–Alum Rock). As of early 2019, station signage was updated to reflect the then-future configuration, displaying line colors rather than terminus icons.

== Station stops ==
Station	Transfer to
Old Ironsides	Orange Line; VTA Bus: 55, 57, 59, Express 121; ACE Shuttle: Green
Great America	Orange Line; VTA Bus: 57, 59; ACE Shuttle: Gray, Yellow
Lick Mill	Orange Line; Altamont Corridor Express (at Great America); Capitol Corridor (at Great America)
Champion	Orange Line; ACE Shuttle: Brown, Purple
Tasman	Blue Line; VTA Bus: 59; ACE Shuttle: Brown
River Oaks	Blue Line; ACE Shuttle: Brown; Park and ride
Orchard	Blue Line; VTA Bus: 20
Bonaventura	Blue Line
Component	Blue Line
Karina	Blue Line
Metro/Airport	Blue Line; VTA Bus: 60
Gish	Blue Line
Civic Center	Blue Line; VTA Bus: 61
Japantown/Ayer	Blue Line
Saint James	Blue Line; VTA Bus: 72, 73
Santa Clara	Blue Line; Monterey–Salinas Transit: 55; VTA Bus: 22, 23, 64A, 64B, 66, 68, 72, 73, Rapid 500, Rapid 522, Rapid 523, Rapid 568
Paseo de San Antonio	Blue Line; VTA Bus: 23, 66, 68, Rapid 523, Rapid 568
Convention Center	Blue Line; VTA Bus: 23, Rapid 523
San Fernando	
San Jose Diridon	Altamont Corridor Express; Amtrak: Capitol Corridor, Coast Starlight; Caltrain: Express, Local, Limited, Weekend Local, South County Connector; Highway 17 Express; VTA Bus: 22, 64A, 64B, 68, Rapid 500, Rapid 522, Rapid 568; Park and ride
Race	
Fruitdale	VTA Bus: 25, Express 103
Bascom	VTA Bus: 61; Park and ride
Hamilton	VTA Bus: 56
Downtown Campbell	VTA Bus: 26
Winchester	VTA Bus: 27, 37, 60, Express 101; Park and ride

=== Station facilities ===
Many stations along this line have park-and-ride lots (labeled as), as well as bike stations (labeled as), including:

- Lick Mill (at Great America Station:)
- River Oaks — also the stop for VTA headquarters
- San Fernando
- San Jose Diridon
- Bascom
- Winchester
