= Reamwood station =

VTA light rail station in Sunnyvale, California

Reamwood
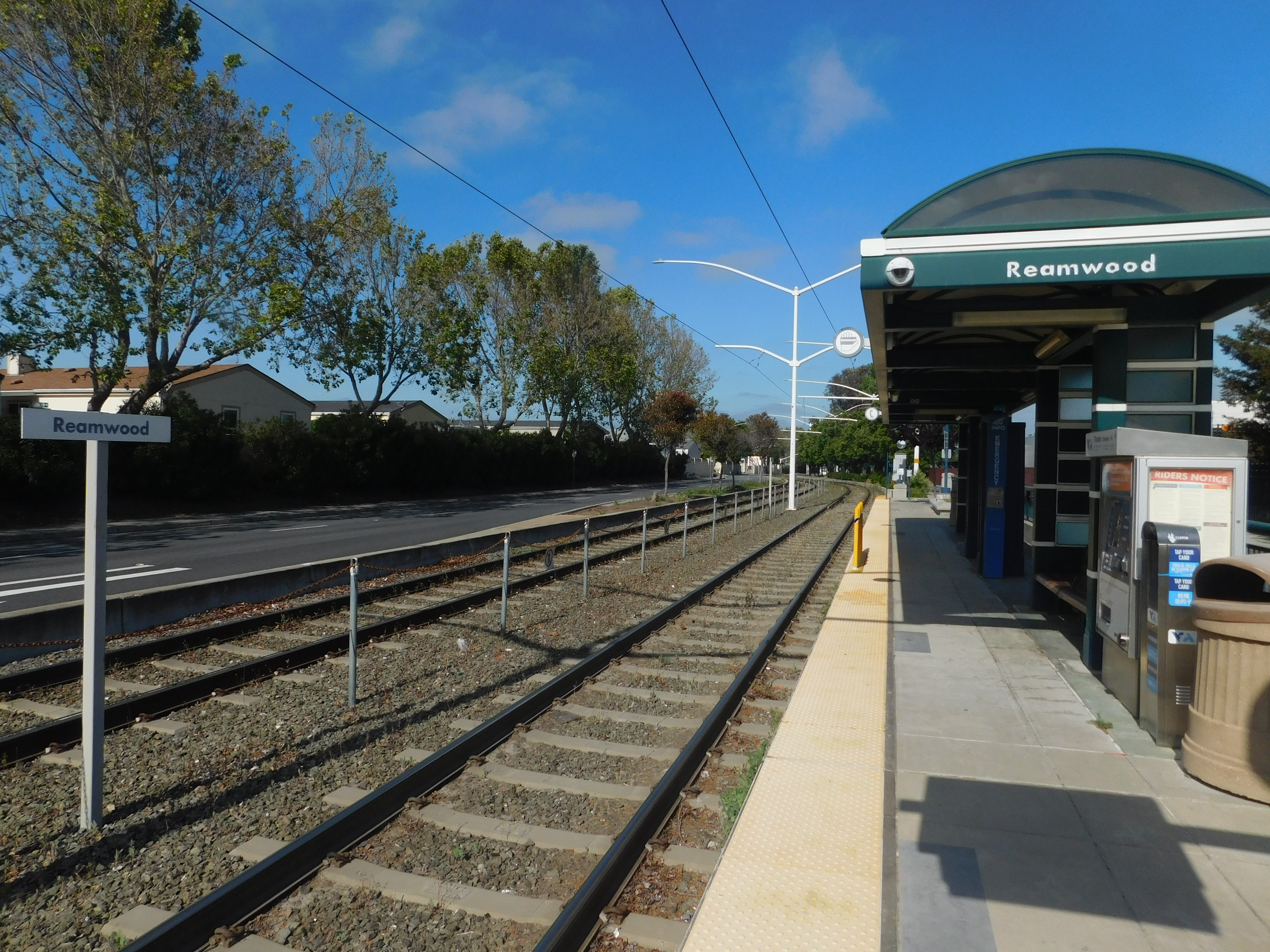
- Reamwood station platform in May 2023.

General information
- Location: Tasman Drive and Reamwood Avenue; Sunnyvale, California
- Coordinates: 37°24′33″N 122°00′41″W
- Owner: Santa Clara Valley Transportation Authority
- Platforms: 2 side platforms
- Tracks: 2
- Connections: VTA Bus: 55

Construction
- Structure type: At-grade
- Accessible: Yes

History
- Opened: December 20, 1999; 26 years ago

Services
Preceding station	VTA	Following station
Vienna toward Mountain View	Orange Line	Old Ironsides toward Alum Rock
Location

Reamwood station is a light rail station operated by Santa Clara Valley Transportation Authority (VTA), located near the intersection of Tasman Drive and Reamwood Avenue in Sunnyvale, California. This station is served by the Orange Line of the VTA light rail system.
