= Old Ironsides station =

VTA light rail station in Santa Clara, California

Old Ironsides
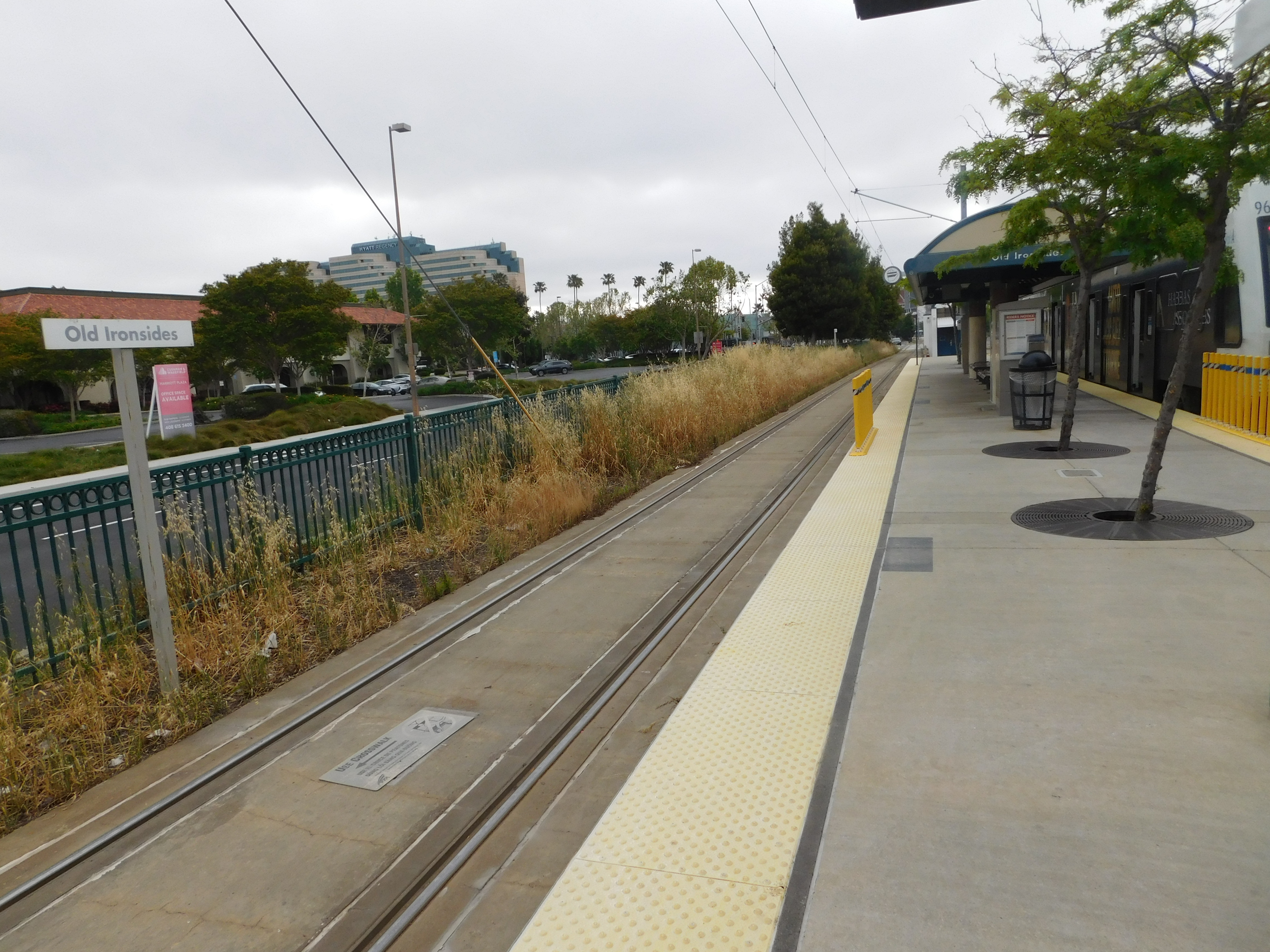
- Old Ironsides station platform in May 2023, looking east

General information
- Location: Tasman Drive and Old Ironsides Drive; Santa Clara, California
- Coordinates: 37°24′12″N 121°58′46″W
- Owner: Santa Clara Valley Transportation Authority
- Line: Guadalupe Phase 1
- Platforms: 1 island platform
- Tracks: 2
- Connections: VTA Bus: 55, 57, 59; ACE Shuttle: Green

Construction
- Structure type: At-grade
- Accessible: Yes

History
- Opened: December 11, 1987; 38 years ago

Services
Preceding station	VTA	Following station
Terminus	Green Line	Great America toward Winchester
Reamwood toward Mountain View	Orange Line	Great America toward Alum Rock
Location

Old Ironsides station is a light rail station in Santa Clara, California operated by the Santa Clara Valley Transportation Authority (VTA) as part of the VTA light rail system. Located at the intersection of Tasman Drive and Old Ironsides Drive, the station is served by the Orange Line and is the northern terminal of the Green Line. Immediately west of the station site is a pocket track and double crossover, allowing Green Line trains to switch between tracks to reverse direction and enabling the storage of three, 3-car trains to mobilize trains quickly after the end of an event at Levi's Stadium.

Old Ironsides station is closed for up to 60 minutes after the events at the nearby Levi's Stadium to prevent crowds from overwhelming the station. VTA's Great America station (which is located closer to the stadium) has additional facilities to handle large crowds.
