= Winchester Transit Center =

VTA light rail station in Campbell, California

Winchester
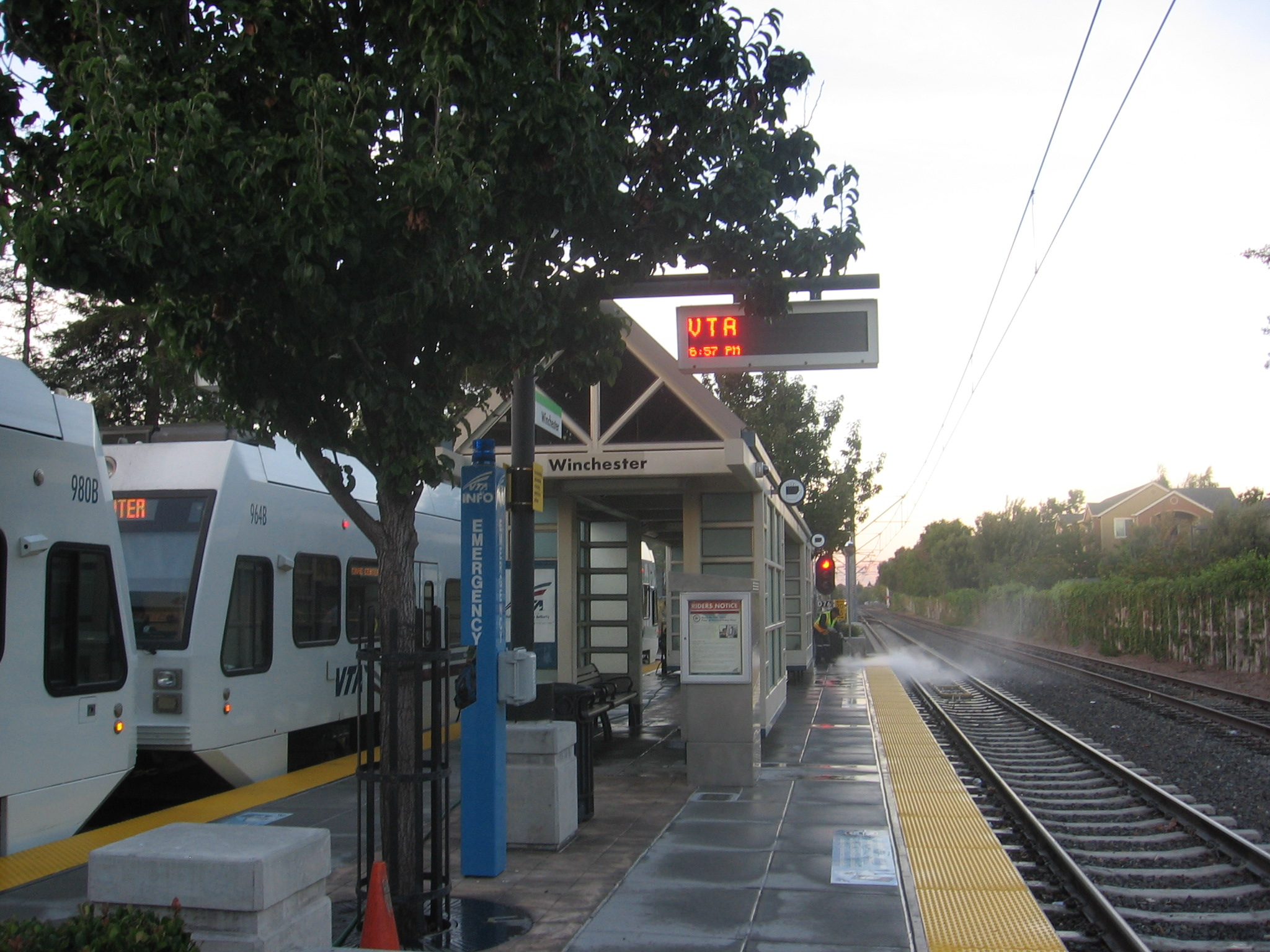
- Station with train waiting to depart in September 2012

General information
- Other names: Winchester Transit Center
- Location: 2400 Winchester Boulevard; Campbell, California
- Coordinates: 37°16′46″N 121°56′53″W
- Owner: Santa Clara Valley Transportation Authority
- Platforms: 1 island platform
- Tracks: 2
- Connections: VTA Bus: 27, 37, 60, Express 101

Construction
- Parking: 54 spaces
- Accessible: Yes

History
- Opened: October 1, 2005

Services
Preceding station	VTA	Following station
Downtown Campbell toward Old Ironsides	Green Line	Terminus
Location

Winchester Transit Center (also known as Winchester station) is a light rail station and park-and-ride lot operated by Santa Clara Valley Transportation Authority (VTA) located on Winchester Boulevard, north of San Tomas Expressway, in Campbell, California. Winchester is the southern terminus of the Green Line of the VTA light rail system.

== History ==
Winchester station was built as part of the Vasona Light Rail extension project. This project extended VTA light rail service from the intersection of Woz Way and West San Carlos Street in San Jose in a southwesterly direction, terminating at this station.

The station began service on October 1, 2005, after a delay of some months after a dispute with the Federal Railroad Administration.

The construction of this station and the rest of the Vasona Light Rail extension was part of the 1996 Measure B Transportation Improvement Program. Santa Clara County voters approved the Measure B project in 1996 along with a half-percent sales tax increase. The Vasona Light Rail extension was funded mostly by the resulting sales tax revenues with additional money coming from federal and state funding, grants, VTA bond revenues, and municipal contributions.

The construction of the Winchester station ended the 74 years that Campbell was without light rail service. "The San Jose Railroads and the Peninsular Railway Company of San Jose" petitioned to stop street car trolley service after the death of Henry C. Blackwood in 1931 and the costs that the railroad would endure with the new state highway being built.

== Nearby points of interest ==
- John D. Morgan Park
