= VTA light rail =

Light rail system in Santa Clara County, California

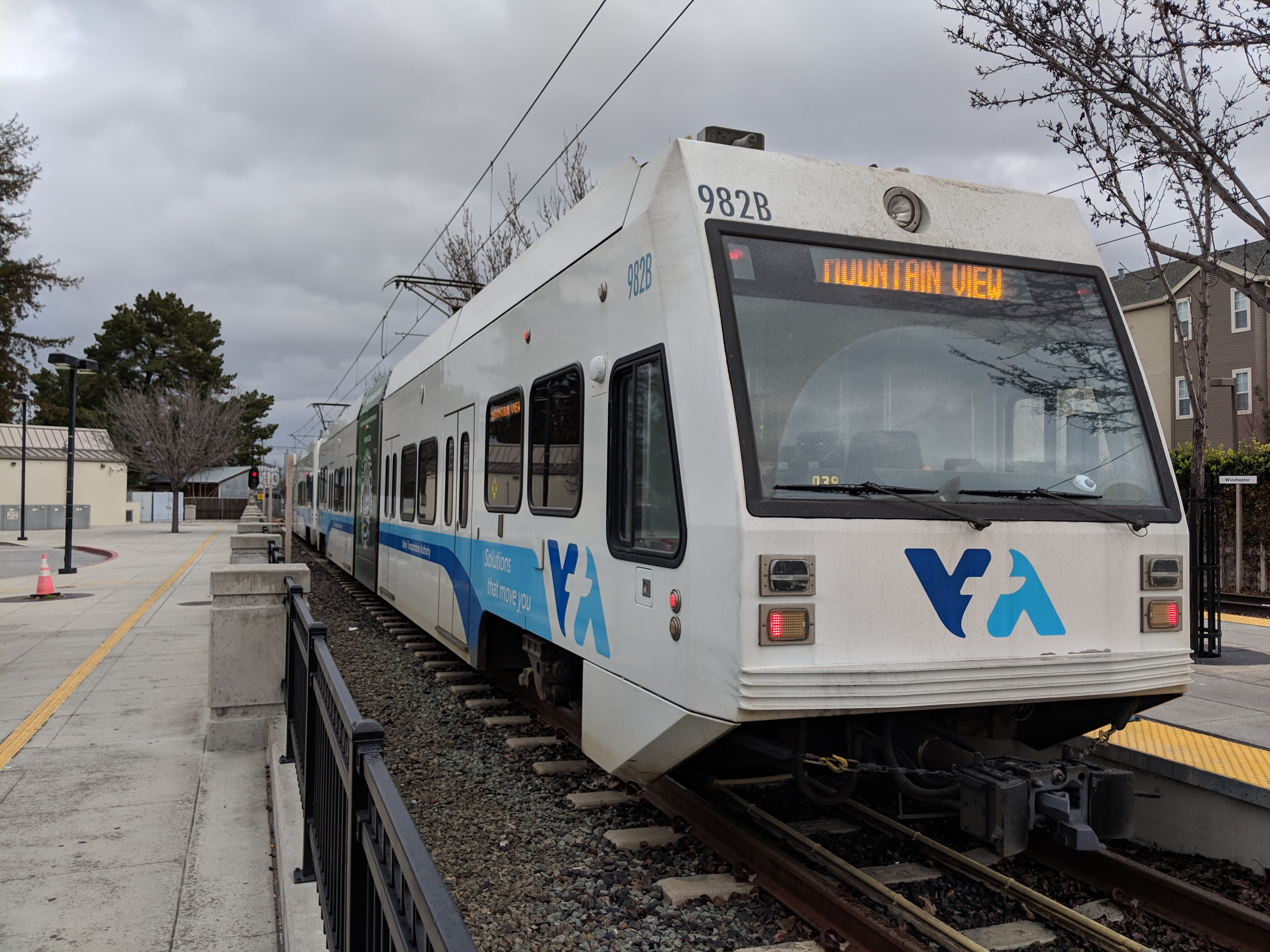
- A VTA light rail train at Winchester station in February 2019

Overview
- Locale: Santa Clara County, California
- Transit type: Light rail
- Number of lines: 3
- Number of stations: 60
- Daily ridership: 17,700 (weekdays, Q2 2026)
- Annual ridership: 4,469,300 (2025)
- Website: vta.org

Operation
- Began operation: December 11, 1987; 38 years ago
- Operator: Santa Clara Valley Transportation Authority
- Number of vehicles: 100 Kinki Sharyo low-floor light rail vehicles
- Train length: 90 ft (27 m) (1 LRV); 180 ft (55 m) (2 LRVs)

Technical
- System length: 42.2 mi (67.9 km)
- Track gauge: 4 ft 8 1/2 in (1,435 mm) standard gauge
- Electrification: Overhead line, 750 V DC
- Top speed: 55 mph (89 km/h)
System map
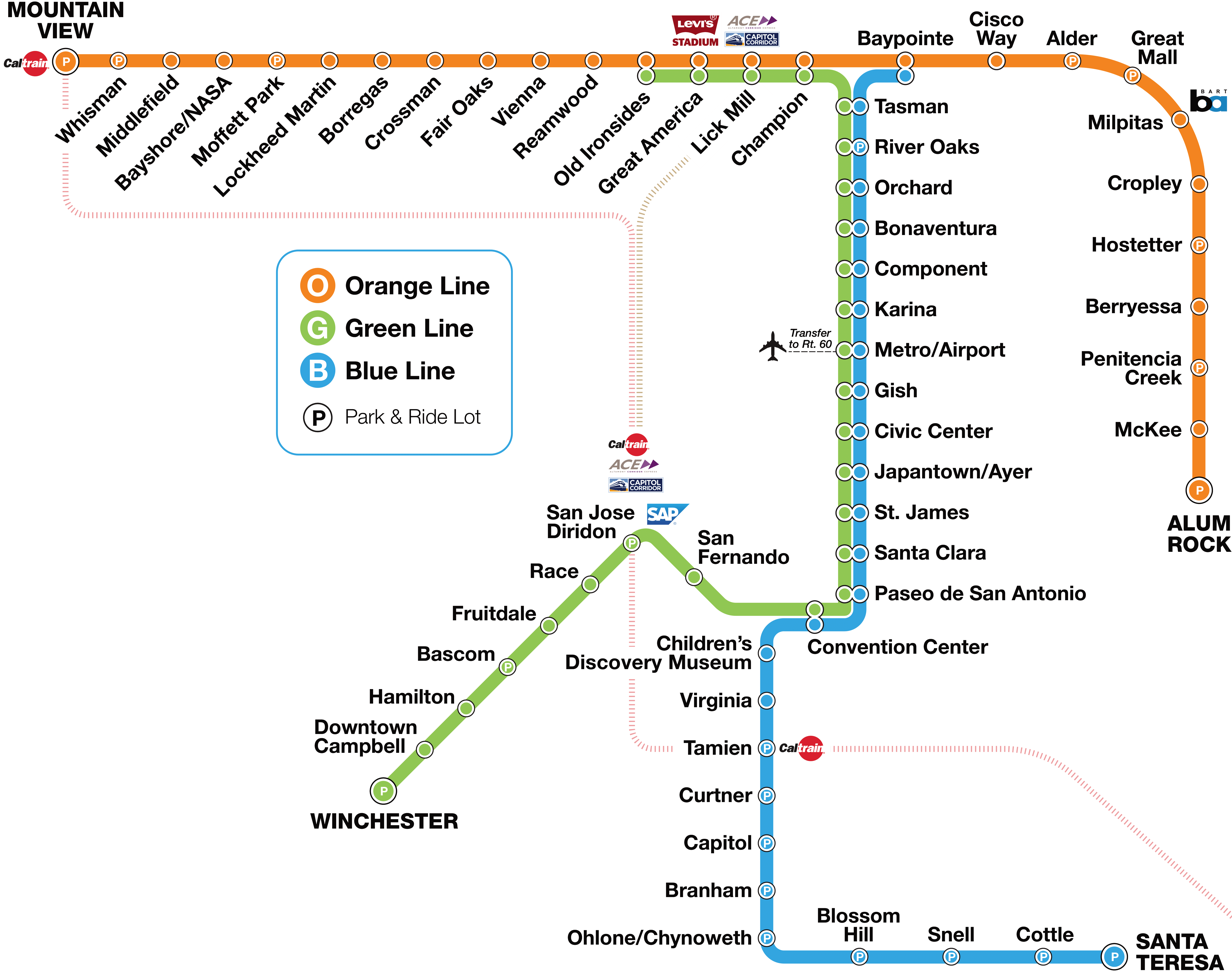
Key

The VTA light rail system serves San Jose and nearby cities in Santa Clara County, California. It is operated by the Santa Clara Valley Transportation Authority (VTA) and has 42.2 miles (67.9 km) of network comprising three main lines on standard gauge tracks. Originally opened on December 11, 1987, the light rail system has expanded since then, and currently has 60 stations in operation.

The light rail system has been criticized for being one of the least used in the United States (an average of 419 boardings per mile as of the second quarter of 2026) and the most heavily subsidized ($9.30 per passenger trip). VTA leaders have admitted that building light rail was a poor match with adjoining land uses. The system's average weekday daily ridership as of the second quarter of 2026 is 17,700 passengers and saw a total of 4,469,300 trips in 2025.

== Service ==
=== Lines ===
VTA operates 42.2 miles (67.9 km) of light rail route on three lines. All the lines and corridors run through are designed to move passengers from the suburban areas of Santa Clara Valley into the major business areas in Downtown, the Santa Clara County Civic Center, and northern Silicon Valley, site of many high-tech company offices.

Light Rail also serves to connect travelers to other transportation systems at several key points: Diridon station offers connections to Caltrain, ACE, Amtrak's Coast Starlight, the Capitol Corridor trains; Milpitas station offers a connection to the BART system; and Metro/Airport station offers a connection to the San Jose International Airport via VTA Bus route 60.

The system is mostly double-tracked with overhead catenary wires. It variously runs along the medians of former railroad rights of way, freeways and surface streets, and pedestrian malls.

| Line name | Length | Stations | Termini | |
| Line name | Length | Stations | Western/Northern | Eastern/Southern |
|---|---|---|---|---|
| Blue Line | 17 mi (27 km) | 26 | Baypointe | Santa Teresa |
| Green Line | 13.9 mi (22.4 km) | 26 | Old Ironsides | Winchester |
| Orange Line | 15.8 mi (25.4 km) | 26 | Mountain View | Alum Rock |

=== Previous lines ===
==== Almaden Shuttle ====
The Almaden shuttle was a three-stop spur from the Ohlone/Chynoweth station to Almaden station at the Almaden Expressway in the Almaden Valley. The shuttle, which ran a single car, took about four minutes to travel between Ohlone/Chynoweth and Almaden. This line had one track, with sidings at Almaden and Ohlone/Chynoweth. The line was discontinued in December 2019 and replaced by bus service.

==== Commuter Express ====
The Commuter Express service operated along the same route as the current Blue Line between Baypointe and Santa Teresa stations, with nonstop service between Convention Center and Ohlone/Chynoweth stations. This weekday, peak-period service offered three trips in the morning and three trips in the evening. The service was introduced in October 2010 and was eliminated in August 2018 because of low ridership.

=== Holly Trolley ===
Sometimes, in the winter, VTA operates a seasonal vintage trolley service called the Holly Trolley. This trolley, a joint project of the VTA and the California Trolley and Railroad Corporation, began operations in December 2012. As of December 2018, it operated between Civic Center and the San Jose Caltrain stations. However, for the 2019 season, it only operated between Civic Center and Convention Center station (VTA) stations.

Although Holly Trolley service was suspended during the COVID-19 pandemic, in November 2024, it was announced that the Holly Trolley will return for the 2024 season. On December 21, 22, 28, and 29, the Holly Trolley operated on the Holly Trolley's route from Civic Center to Convention Center stations. The exact schedule will depend on the weather, since the streetcar cannot operate in the rain. The car that will be used, Car 2001, was originally built in 1928 for use on the tram network in Milan, Italy, where it was used until it was donated to San Jose by the Italian government in the 1980s. This will be the first time since 2018 that Car 2001 has operated.

=== Stations ===
Unusually for light rail systems in the United States, most VTA Light Rail stops are made by request. Similar to VTA's bus network, passengers must be visible to the operator while waiting at stations and must notify the operator using the bell before the train arrives at its destination. Trains will typically skip stops (other than line termini) if no one is waiting on the platform and no one requests to disembark.

=== Hours and frequency ===
Lines run for 20 hours per day on weekdays, with headways of 15 minutes for most of the day. On weekends, the train runs at 20-minute headways throughout the day. After around 8:00 p.m. on weekdays and 7:00 p.m. on weekends, trains run at 30- to 60-minute headways. The light rail frequency does not meet VTA's definition of "frequent service."

== History ==
Santa Clara County began planning for a light rail system in the mid-1970s, after the successful development of the San Diego Trolley and amid a surge in light rail construction in mid-sized cities nationwide (Buffalo, Denver, Portland and Sacramento also built systems at the same time).

The county received $2 million from the federal government in 1982 to fund the preliminary engineering phase for the County’s first light rail line. The operation of the line and some of the construction costs would be funded by a half-cent sales tax for a transit district voters in Santa Clara county had approved in 1976. The light rail proposal was championed by County Supervisor Rod Diridon Sr. and Congressman Norman Mineta.

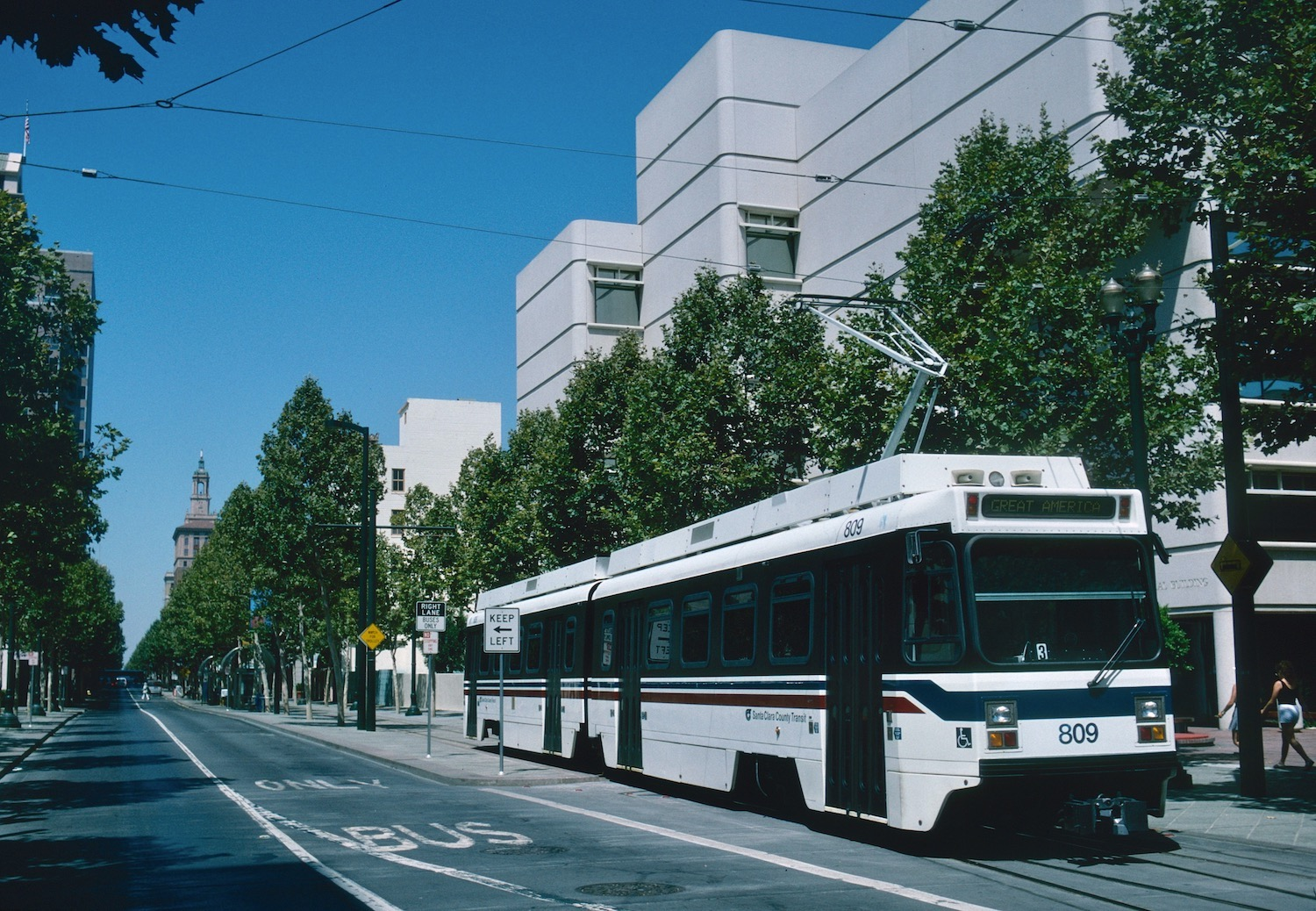
Light rail service reached downtown San Jose in June 1988, six months after the system opened. A UTDC-built light rail car is shown on S. First Street in 1993.

=== Guadalupe Line ===
The first phase, then called the Guadalupe Line, broke ground on March 23, 1984, and opened for revenue service on time on December 11, 1987, running between Old Ironsides station (near the Great America theme park and Silicon Valley office parks) and a temporary Civic Center station at First and Younger (near the junction to VTA's Guadalupe Division rail yard on Younger). The second phase opened about six months later on June 17, 1988, and extended the rails south from a permanent Civic Center station (replacing the temporary First and Younger station) through a transit mall in Downtown San Jose to Convention Center station. The third phase opened on August 17, 1990, extending rails into the median of California State Route 87 (Guadalupe Freeway) to Tamien station, adding the first connection to Caltrain. The fourth and final phase of the Guadalupe Line added rails in the median of California State Route 85 (West Valley Freeway) to a terminus at Santa Teresa station just off the freeway in South San Jose. Originally projected to be completed in late 1988, it was delayed for a two-year review and opened on April 25, 1991, with a scaled-down interchange between State Routes 85 and 87 and more sound walls. At the same time, the now abandoned Almaden spur line opened.

=== Expansion ===
The system's first major expansion, Tasman West, opened in 1999, extending the rails from the northern end of the Guadalupe line to Mountain View.

In May 2001, the first phase of the Tasman East extension opened, connecting the Tasman West line to Milpitas. New Kinki Sharyo low-floor light rail vehicles were introduced to this line the following year. Phase two of the Tasman East and the Capitol extension, completed in 2004, brought service east to the Great Mall of the Bay Area and the Alum Rock Transit Center.

On October 1, 2005, the first phase of the Vasona extension was completed, extending the system from downtown San Jose through San Jose Diridon station to the Winchester Transit Center along a former Union Pacific Railroad right of way.

The agency had ambitious plans to expand the light rail system, which have mostly been canceled. The Capitol Expressway extension would have extended the system 8 miles (13 km) south from Alum Rock station to Capitol station, the second phase of the Vasona extension would have extended the system 1.5 miles (2.4 km) south from Winchester station to the line's namesake Vasona Junction, and the Santa Clara / Alum Rock extension would have added 4 miles (6.4 km) of track along the busy Santa Clara Street. Of these, only the Capitol Expressway extension (currently known as the Eastridge to BART Regional Connector) has gone forward, with construction on the 2.5 mile (4.0 km) extension beginning in June 2024. Phase 2 of the Vasona Extension has been cancelled, and the Santa Clara / Alum Rock extension became a bus rapid transit line, Rapid 522. No new lines have been added to the system since 2005.

The system received a major reconfiguration in 2019 and 2020, coinciding with the completion of the Silicon Valley BART extension. The Orange Line was established between Mountain View, Milpitas (the new BART station), and Alum Rock, the Blue Line was truncated at Baypointe, and the Almaden Shuttle line was discontinued entirely and replaced with a new bus route.

On May 26, 2021, a mass shooting occurred at the VTA light rail yard (Guadalupe Division). Ten people, including the gunman, were killed during the shooting, the deadliest in the history of the San Francisco Bay Area. As a result of the shooting, the entire light rail system was shut down for months. The system partially restarted on August 30, 2021, and fully restarted a few weeks later on September 18.

Service history of VTA light rail corridors
| Corridor | Map color | Opened | Terminus 1 | Terminus 2 | Length | Stations | Ref. |
|---|---|---|---|---|---|---|---|
| Guadalupe Phase 1 | | December 11, 1987 | Old Ironsides | Civic Center (Note: Temporary station at North First Street and West Younger Avenue) | 6.8 mi (10.9 km) | 12 | |
| Guadalupe Phase 2 | | June 17, 1988 | Civic Center | Convention Center | 1.8 mi (2.9 km) | 5 | |
| Guadalupe Phase 3 | | August 17, 1990 | Convention Center | Tamien | 1.6 mi (2.6 km) | 3 | |
| Guadalupe Phase 4 | | April 25, 1991 | Tamien | Santa Teresa | 8.6 mi (13.8 km) | 8 | |
| Almaden Spur | | April 25, 1991 (Note: Almaden Spur abandoned December 27, 2019.) | Ohlone/Chynoweth | Almaden | 1.1 mi (1.8 km) | 2 | |
| Tasman West | | December 17, 1999 | Old Ironsides | Mountain View | 7.6 mi (12.2 km) | 16 (Note: Baypointe and Champion (infill) stations were also added as part of the Tasman West project. Evelyn station later abandoned on March 16, 2015.) | |
| Tasman East Phase 1 | | May 2001 | Baypointe | I-880/Milpitas | 1.9 mi (3.1 km) | 2 | |
| Tasman East Phase 2 | | June 24, 2004 | I-880/Milpitas | Hostetter | 2.9 mi (4.7 km) | 4 | |
| Capitol | | June 24, 2004 | Hostetter | Alum Rock | 3.5 mi (5.6 km) | 4 | |
| Vasona | | October 1, 2005 | Convention Center | Winchester | 5.3 mi (8.5 km) | 8 | |
| Eastridge | | (2029) | Alum Rock | Eastridge | 2.4 mi (3.9 km) | 2 | |

== Criticism ==
VTA's light rail system has been criticized for being one of the least used in the United States, and consequently one of the most heavily subsidized.

A 2019 report by the Civil Grand Jury of Santa Clara County compared VTA and its light rail system to other transit operators with light rail systems that served comparably sized areas. They found that the VTA served 24.3 passenger trips per revenue hour, making it the second least effective transit system of the group. In terms of efficiency, VTA had the highest cost per passenger trip ($9.30) and the second-highest increase in costs (65%). Comparing the light rail systems alone, VTA had the lowest farebox recovery (9.3%) in the peer group.

The Grand Jury also found that VTA had failed to “accurately estimate the ongoing operating and capital costs of maintaining the light-rail system,” concluding that that failure, “has led, in part, to (the agency's) recurring financial deficits.” The VTA has said that the operating costs could be cut in half and farebox recovery doubled if a bus-only system were deployed.

Two of VTA's former board chairs, Teresa O’Neill and Sam Liccardo said they agreed with many of the report’s criticisms, and placed the blame on poor planning by the agency in the 1980s and poor land-use decisions in the years since the system was built out. Along much of the light rail routes, trains do not serve densely populated areas but instead run past single-story office buildings, single-family homes and empty lots. Both Liccardo and O’Neill have advocated for replacing light rail with alternative technologies, like autonomous electric buses, that could be less expensive to operate.

As part of its findings, the Grand Jury recommended the VTA board to abandon its plans for an extension of the Orange Line to the Eastridge Transit Center (see: Eastridge to BART extension section). The US$453 million project would attract approximately 611 new riders (after considering the reduction in ridership on the existing parallel bus lines). The board rejected that recommendation saying that the project had been approved by voters.

== Rolling stock ==
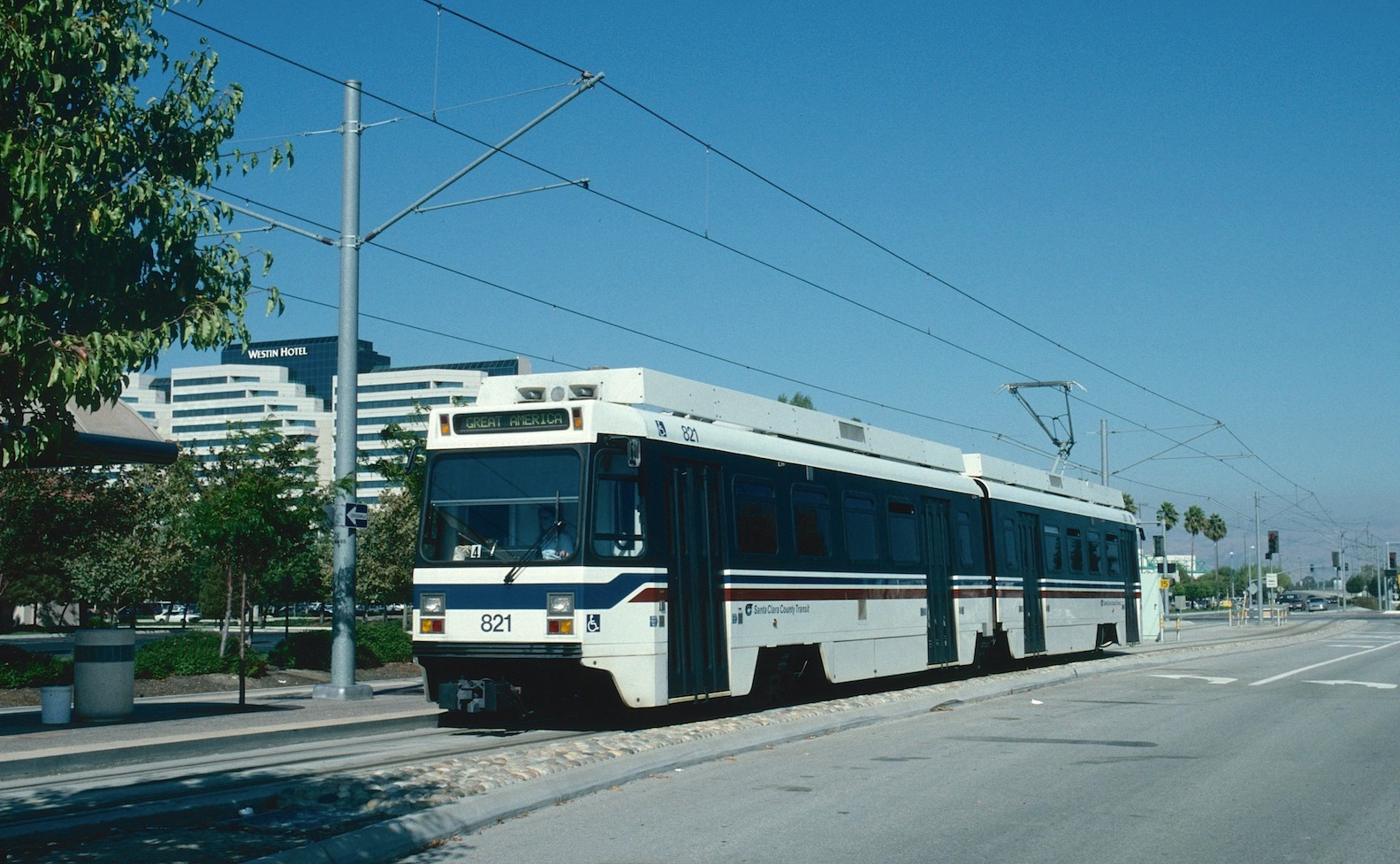
A UTDC-built LRV arriving at Old Ironsides station in 1993. These high-floor cars were replaced in 2003.

From 1987 when the system was launched until September 2003, the system was served by a fleet of high-floor light rail vehicles (LRVs) built by Urban Transportation Development Corporation and designated as ALRV. The first car arrived in March 1987. Accessibility for disabled riders was provided by wheelchair lifts at each station. The original high-floor fleet was leased to investors (for a 33-year term, starting in 1998), and then subleased back to VTA. In May 2003, VTA sub-subleased the UTDC LRVs to other light rail operators for an initial 13-year term, with a renewal term of 9 years; VTA retains responsibility for LRV operation, maintenance, and insurance. 29 were sent to the Utah Transit Authority (UTA, $5.2 million rental payments), and 21 were sent to the Sacramento Regional Transit District (SacRT, $4.1 million rental payments). In September 2013, RT exercised its option to purchase the 21 sub-leased vehicles at $1,000 each. UTA subsequently exercised its purchase option for the 29 sub-leased vehicles in 2017. 28 of the UTA vehicles, renumbered 1042–1069, were sold at auction on December 26, 2017. The UTA cars were withdrawn from service in 2018.

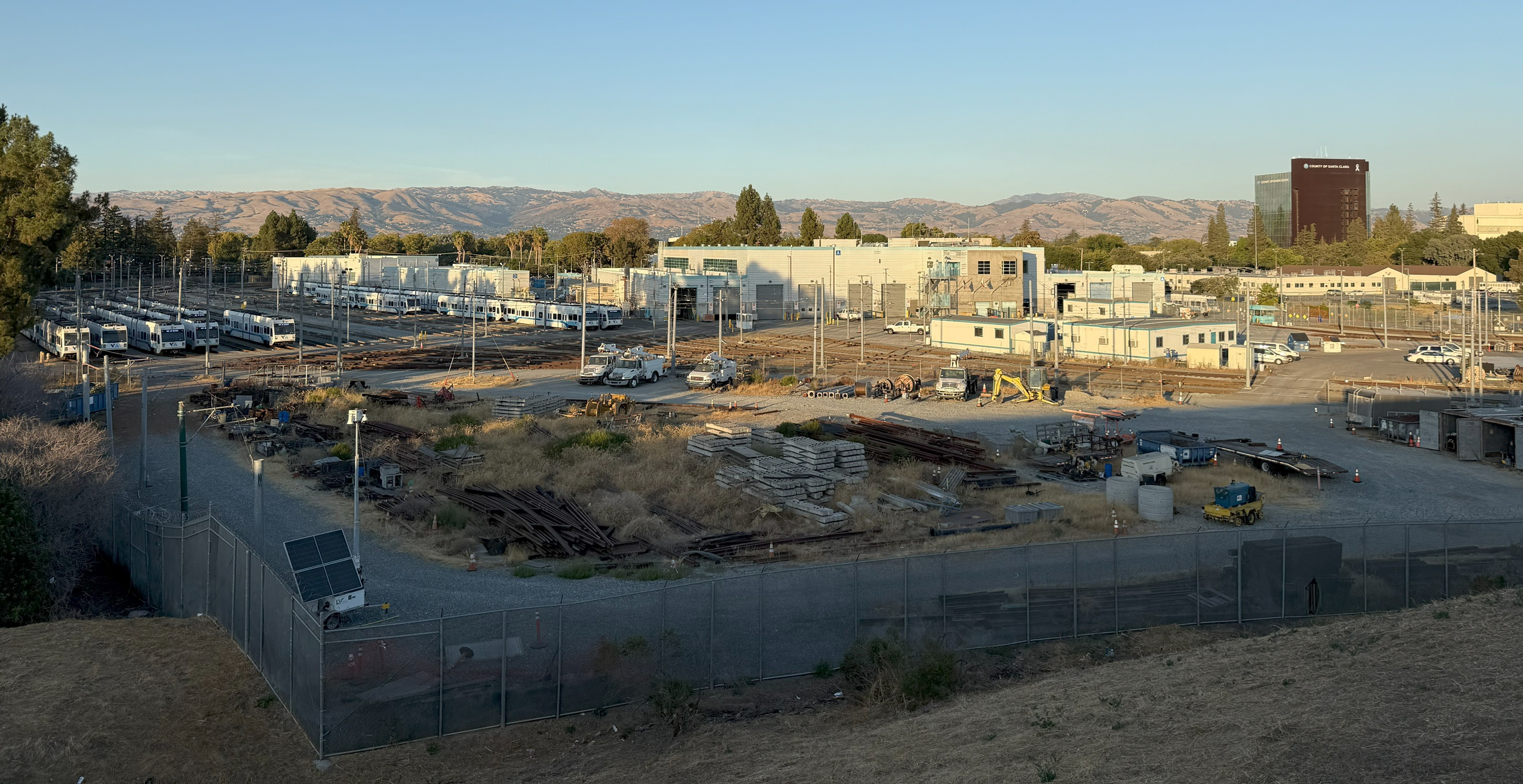
Guadalupe Division rail yard in 2025

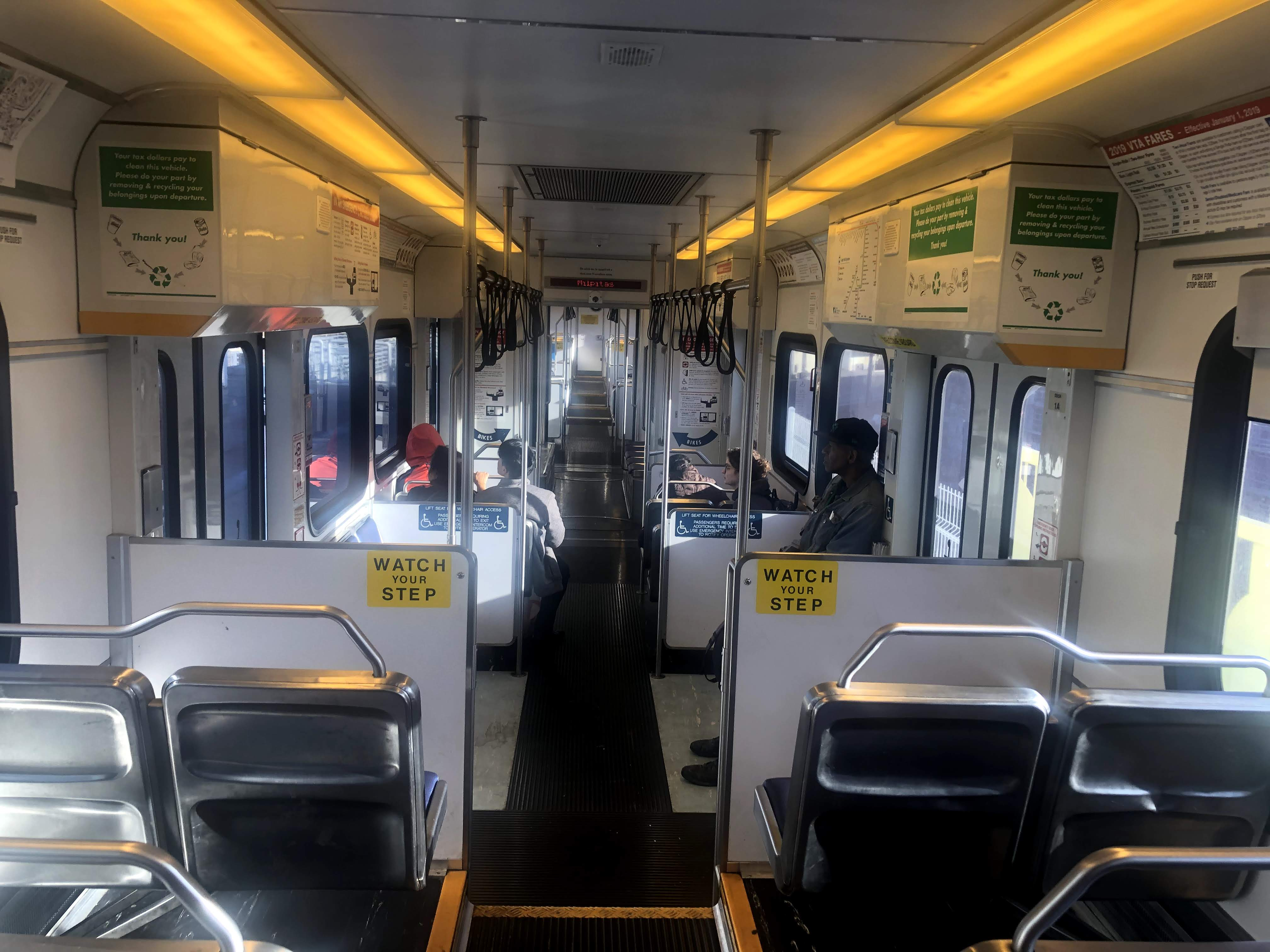
Interior of a VTA Light Rail Vehicle

In 2002, VTA introduced a fleet of 100 new Kinki Sharyo low-floor LRVs. The Kinki Sharyo LRVs are equipped with a low floor over 70% of the passenger area at 14 in (356 mm) above top-of-rail (ATOR), with the remaining high-floor area 35 in (889 mm) ATOR; up to three LRVs may be coupled into a single train. The low-floor LRVs initially operated only on the Tasman West line (Mountain View to Alder), because their floor height only matched the 14-inch (356 mm) platform height along that line. After VTA reconstructed platforms along North First Street from the Japantown/Ayer stop northward (with wooden ramps provided for the lead car's front door elsewhere), VTA replaced the entire fleet in 2003 with low-floor LRVs. Currently, all stations provide level boarding at all doors. Trains are usually coupled in two LRV consists, which was reduced to one during the COVID-19 pandemic, but has since been restored to two cars.

VTA Light Rail Vehicle comparison
| Model | UTDC high-floor/ALRV | Kinki Sharyo low-floor |
|---|---|---|
| Image | | |
| Status | Retired 2003 | In service |
| Car numbers | 801–850 | 900–999 |
| Years built | 1985–1987 | 2001–2005 |
| Length (over couplers) | 88 ft 6 in (26.97 m) | 90 ft (27 m) |
| Width | 8 ft 8 in (2.64 m) | 8.67 ft (2.64 m) |
| Height | 12 ft 5 in (3.78 m) | 11.08 ft (3.38 m) |
| Weight | 98,700 lb (44,800 kg) | 99,980 lb (45,350 kg) |
| Axles/ articulation | 6/1 | 6/2 |
| Motors | | 4×190 hp (140 kW), 2 per powered truck |
| Capacity | 67 seated 155 standing | 64 seated 170 standing |
| Max Speed | 55 mph (89 km/h) | 62 mph (100 km/h) |
| Acceleration | 4.4 ft/s^{2} (1.34 m/s^{2}) | |
| Deceleration | 5.1 ft/s^{2} (1.56 m/s^{2}) | |

== Major accidents and incidents ==
=== Virginia station derailment ===
On March 21, 2008, at approximately 7:10 p.m., a southbound 2-car light rail train derailed just north of the Virginia station. Four people, including the train operator, were injured, and the train was heavily damaged. At the time of the accident, trains were operating on a single track through the area because of construction at three nearby light rail stations. The train involved was attempting to switch between tracks when it derailed. VTA ruled out mechanical or equipment failure as a cause for the accident. An investigation indicated human error ("the train traveling southbound stopped over the switch and reversed, which are violations of operating rules").

=== San Jose maintenance yard shooting ===
On May 26, 2021, a mass shooting occurred at a VTA rail yard in San Jose, California. Ten people, including the gunman, were killed during the shooting. It is the deadliest mass shooting in the history of the San Francisco Bay Area. As a result of the shooting, service was suspended indefinitely across the light rail system and returned in stages throughout August and September.

== Future ==
The system was initially envisioned as a loop and spoke system, with commuters riding a circular outer route before transferring to radial lines to reach their destinations. With about 40% of the original plans realized as of 2023, future developments are expected to complete the outer loop. Service may be extended along the Mayfield Cutoff and Vasona Industrial Lead to connect the western segments of the system.

=== Eastridge to BART Regional Connector ===
The Eastridge to BART Regional Connector (formerly known as the Capitol Expressway extension) will extend the Orange Line south of the Alum Rock Transit Center to the Eastridge Transit Center along Capitol Expressway. Tracks will run on an elevated viaduct starting just south of Alum Rock before becoming at-grade near the end of the extension. The project is a truncated segment of the original plan to run rails for the full length of Capitol Expressway to interchange with the original Guadalupe Line.

The extension will include two new stations: an elevated Story station at Story Road and a at-grade terminal at the Eastridge Transit Center. (A third station, Ocala, was proposed, but was dropped from the final plans.) Both stations will feature public art, and the Story station will include a pedestrian bridge.

The US$453 million project was criticized in a 2019 report by the Civil Grand Jury of Santa Clara County (see: Criticism section). The Grand Jury recommended the VTA board to abandon the extension because the project would attract approximately 611 new riders (after considering the reduction in ridership on the existing parallel bus lines). The board rejected that recommendation saying that the project had been approved by voters.

VTA approved the final environmental impact statement of this segment in June 2019. With the project setbacks and limited funding, the line eventually started pre-construction activities in early 2021. It also got fully funded in early 2023 from a $46 million state grant. A groundbreaking was held on June 8th, 2024, with passenger service planned for 2029.
