= Valley Transportation Authority =

Public transit operator in Santa Clara County, California

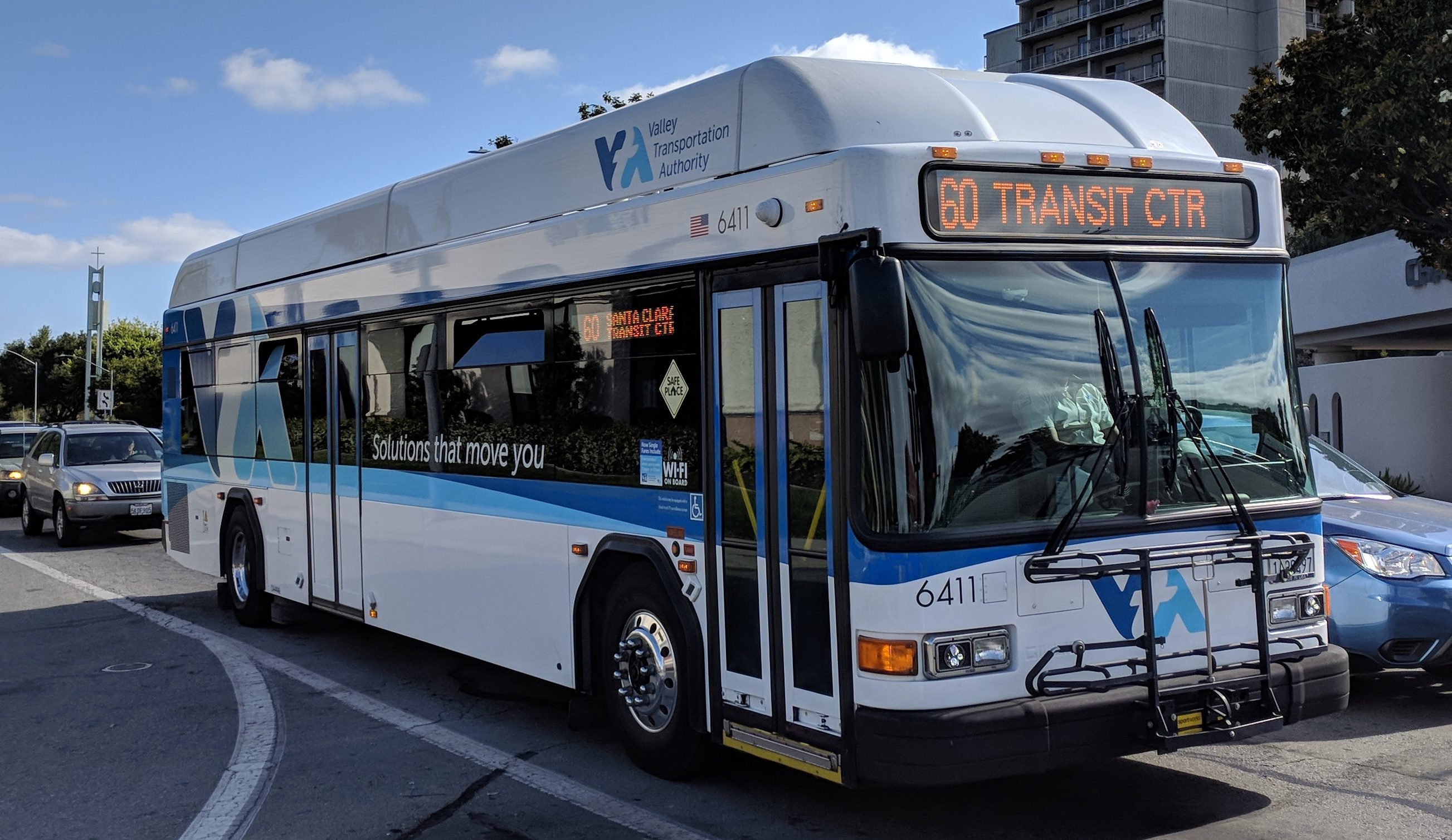

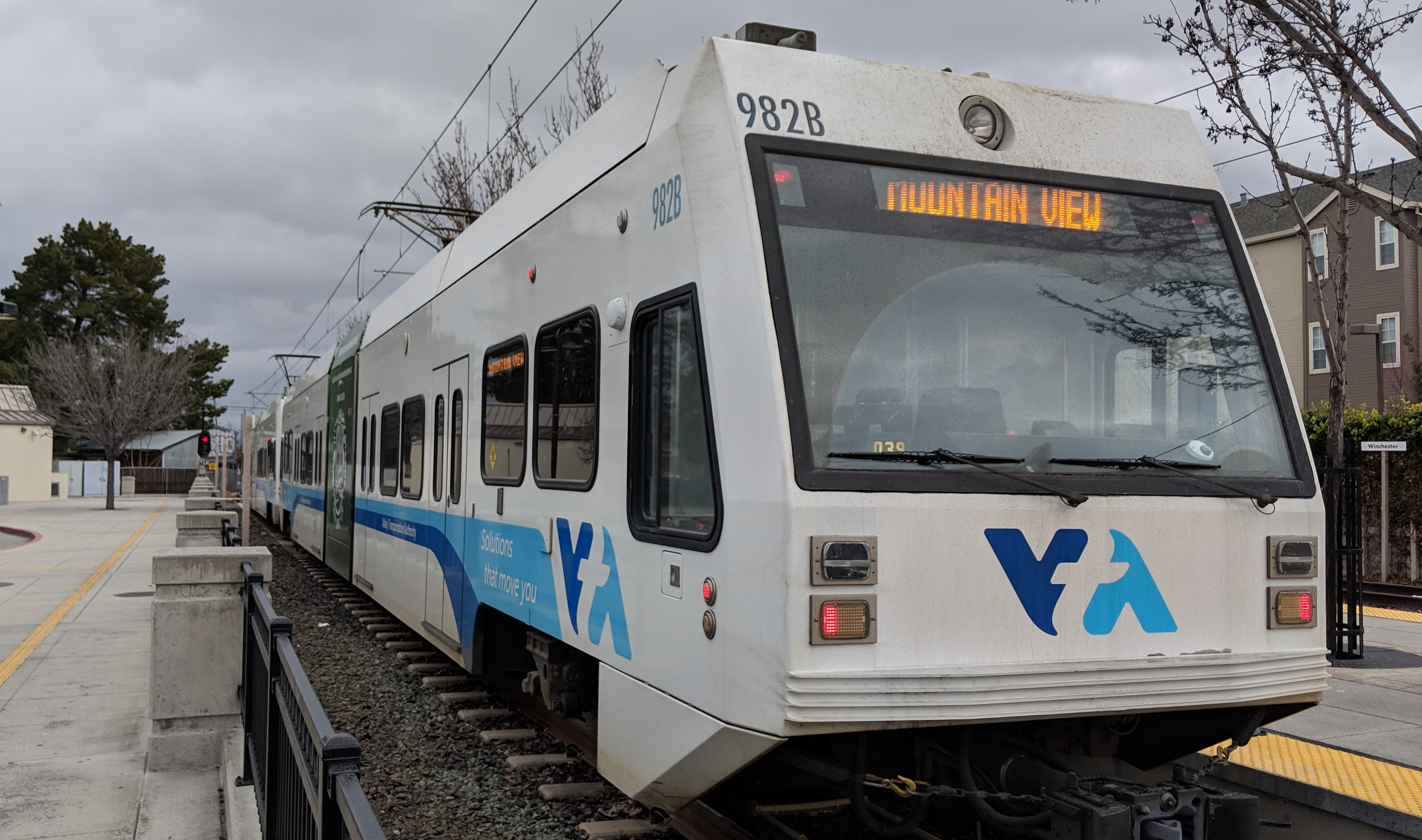
- VTA bus (top) and light rail vehicle (bottom)

Overview
- Locale: Santa Clara County, California
- Transit type: Bus; Light rail Bus rapid transit
- Number of lines: 70 bus, 3 light rail
- Number of stations: 62
- Daily ridership: 96,200 (weekdays, Q2 2026)
- Annual ridership: 27,576,300 (2025)
- Website: vta.org

Operation
- Began operation: January 1, 1973; 53 years ago

Technical
- System length: 42.2 mi (67.9 km) (light rail)

The Santa Clara Valley Transportation Authority, more commonly known simply as the Valley Transportation Authority (VTA), is a special district responsible for public transit services, congestion management, specific highway capacity expansion projects, and countywide transportation planning for Santa Clara County, California. It serves San Jose, California, and the surrounding Silicon Valley. It is one of the governing parties for the Caltrain commuter rail line that serves the county. In 2025, the VTA's public transportation services had a combined ridership of 27,576,300, or about 96,200 per weekday as of the second quarter of 2026.

== History ==
=== Santa Clara County Transit District ===
In 1969, Santa Clara County had three private bus companies, all of which were in serious financial trouble: Peninsula Transit, San Jose City Lines, and Peerless Stages. The California Legislature enacted the Santa Clara County Transit District Act in 1969, which allowed the Santa Clara County Board of Supervisors to place a ballot measure asking county voters if the Santa Clara County Transit District (SCCTD) should be formed. However, the Act did not supply any funding from the state level for the new district; SCCTD would be funded as required by issuing bonds. At the time, county voters were reluctant to raise their own taxes to support a local public transit system. The formation of the Santa Clara County Transit District was rejected in 1969 and 1970 before it was finally approved by county voters on June 6, 1972. The SCCTD took over the operations of the three old bus companies on January 1, 1973.

On September 26, 1974, the county Board of Supervisors dissolved the Public Works Department. Non-transit operations went into a new General Services Agency, while transit operations were placed into a new Santa Clara County Transportation Agency. Under the terms of the SCCTD Act, the five-member Board of Supervisors also served as the Board of Supervisors for the new transit district. They would be advised by a commission consisting of members appointed by the cities (one member appointed by each city in the county) and five members of the public appointed by the county supervisors. SCCTD administration would be led by an executive officer.

In its early years the Santa Clara County Transportation District approached the task of replacing the bus fleet it inherited from its predecessors, which was in need of upgrades and repair. At first the district bought propane-fueled Twin Coaches and Gillig/Neoplans. SCCTD switched to an all-diesel fleet after six buses went up in flames between December 1977 and April 1978. At the time, critics referred to the buses as "rolling propane bombs."

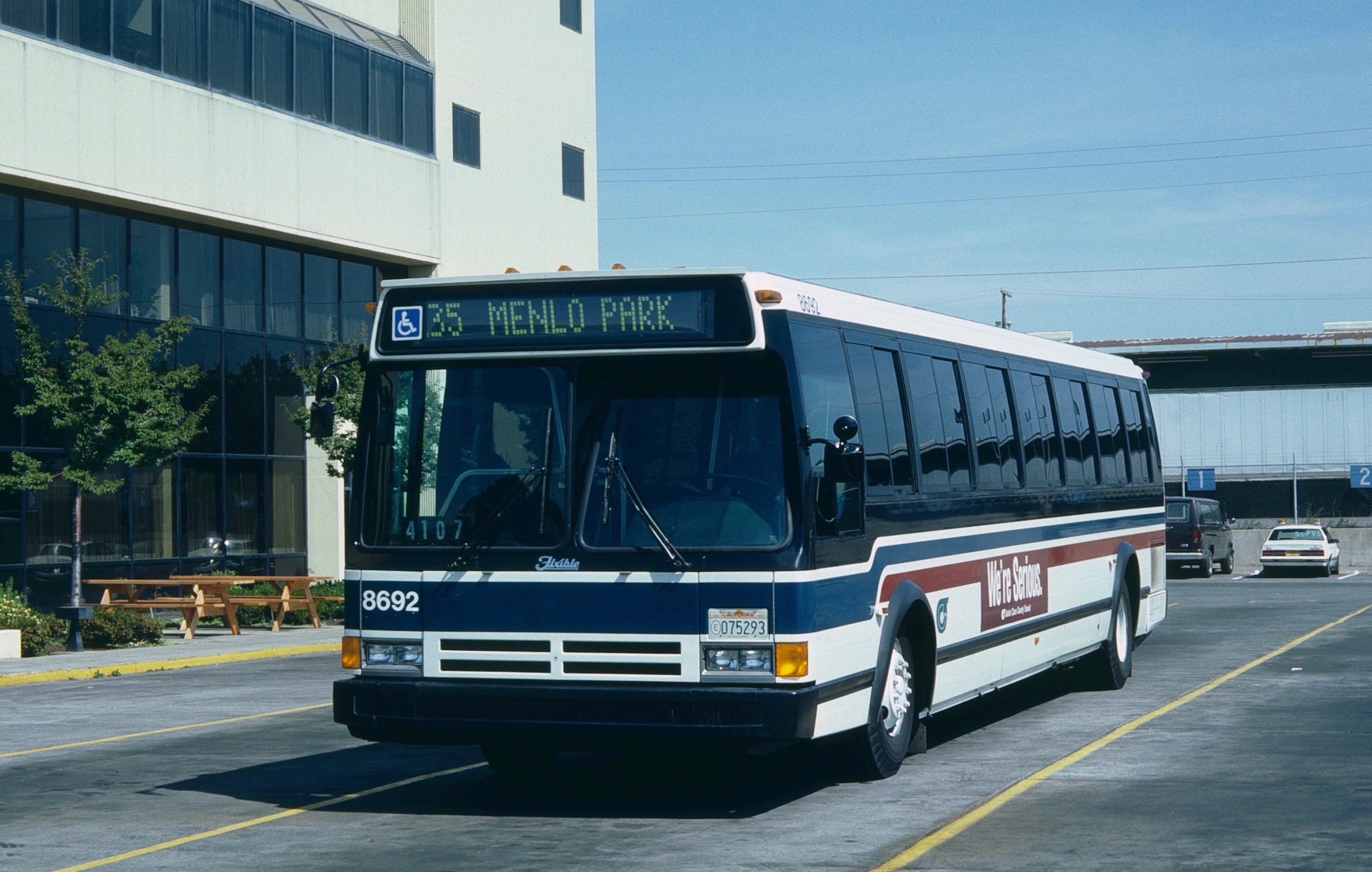
A 1986 Flxible Metro bus of Santa Clara County Transit

On March 6, 1976, Santa Clara County voters approved a half-cent sales tax, Measure A, to help support the Santa Clara County Transit District. In 1977, the primary Overhaul and Repair Facility was built at the Cerone Yard. Also in 1977, County Supervisors decided to change the bus fleet from propane to diesel and ordered 102 buses. By 1979, three additional bus yards were built and commissioned into service.

In December 1978, the SCCTD approved an affirmative action plan for the Transportation Agency to improve the diversity of its workforce. On March 25, 1987, after a long legal battle, the U.S. Supreme Court by a 6–3 majority upheld the gender component of the plan against a civil rights challenge in Johnson v. Transportation Agency.

The transit district broke ground on a new light rail system in 1986. It commenced revenue service along the Guadalupe line on December 11, 1987. With the introduction of light rail service, the transit district replaced its traditional blue and orange color scheme with blue and burgundy across the system, to better match the Tuscan red on the new light rail stations. Expansion of the single line continued in sections until 1991 when the starter system was completed to Santa Teresa station in South San Jose including the Almaden spur line.

=== Santa Clara Valley Transportation Authority ===
VTA's old logo, which was used from 1998 to January 2017

On January 1, 1995, the SCCTD merged with the county Congestion Management Agency to become the Santa Clara Valley Transportation Authority (SCVTA). In December 1996, the agency adopted a shorter trade name, Valley Transportation Authority (VTA), as well as a new logo.

In 1996, voters approved a half-cent general county sales tax, Measure B, and a companion list of transportation projects recommended to be funded with Measure B, called (1996) Measure A. The two measures were designed to adhere to the rule in the California State Constitution that requires a two-thirds supermajority to pass any special purpose sales tax, but only a majority vote to pass a general sales tax. The measure was challenged, but in 1998, the California Supreme Court ruled that the two measure system was valid. The tax was to be collected for ten years.

In 2000, voters approved a 30-year extension of the 1996 sales tax to fund the Silicon Valley BART extension, which will eventually extend Bay Area Rapid Transit from its original terminus in Fremont to Santa Clara Transit Center. 2000 Measure A also included funding for light rail extensions, bus service expansion, expansion and electrification of Caltrain service, and connections from San Jose International Airport to BART, Caltrain and VTA light rail. The measure was placed on the ballot by the VTA and did not include funding specifically for highway projects. The measure passed with 70% of the vote. Revenues from the sales tax would not begin being collected until April 2006.

After 2000, due to the dot-com bust, existing revenue sources declined and VTA was forced to cut service and increase fares. VTA introduced a series of fare increases between 1998 and 2005. VTA's farebox recovery is approximately 13% and the Authority is focused on increasing the ratio. VTA contemplated service reductions in 2003 to address its budget problems. Instead, VTA changed routes to respond to customer demands and by 2008 saw increased ridership numbers.

In keeping with 2000 Measure A, VTA needed additional funding to deliver the 6-mile-long (9.7 km) second phase of the BART Silicon Valley extension to Santa Clara, including the 5-mile-long (8.0 km) subway tunnel through downtown San Jose. Measure B, added to the November 2016 ballot, would raise $6.3 billion for transit projects via a half-cent increase in sales tax. It included up to $1.6 billion for the BART extension, as well as funds for Caltrain electrification, grade separation, and road improvements. Voters passed the 2016 Measure B, which required a two-thirds majority vote. A lawsuit was filed in January 2017 by Cheriel Jensen to challenge the validity of the measure. It was initially dismissed with prejudice in July 2017, but an appeal was subsequently filed in August 2017 to the 6th District Court of Appeal. Pending a resolution, the funds collected by taxes introduced by 2016 Measure B were held in an escrow account. The appeals court upheld the dismissal, and on January 23, 2019, the California Supreme Court refused to hear the final appeal. In January 2020, climate activists pushed the VTA to reallocate Measure B funds away from road projects and into more transit improvements, but were voted down at the San Jose City Council, which controls a majority of the VTA's board.

On June 13, 2020, VTA opened the first 10-mile-long (16 km) phase of the BART Silicon Valley extension to the Berryessa/North San José station, ceding operations to the Bay Area Rapid Transit District.

In April 2021, the VTA suffered a ransomware attack that disabled many of the agency's computer systems, including the paratransit reservation tracker.

On May 26, 2021, a mass shooting occurred at a VTA rail yard in San Jose, California. Ten people, including the gunman, were killed during the shooting, making it the deadliest mass shooting in the history of the San Francisco Bay Area.

On March 10, 2025, VTA experienced the first strike by bus and train operators in the agency's history, with 1,500 workers walking off the job after labor negotiations between the agency and the Amalgamated Transit Union Local 265 broke down. All VTA bus and light rail service was suspended as a result. On March 26, a Santa Clara County Superior Court Judge issued a preliminary injunction compelling the workers to return to work thus ending the strike.

== Leadership ==
=== Board of directors ===
Starting from January 1, 1995, the Santa Clara VTA special district is governed by a board of directors with 12 voting members composed of political leaders at the city and county level, including the Santa Clara County Board of Supervisors, San Jose City Council, and other cities including Campbell, Cupertino, Fremont, Gilroy, Los Altos, Los Altos Hills, Los Gatos, Milpitas, Monte Sereno, Morgan Hill, Mountain View, Palo Alto, Santa Clara, San Martin, Saratoga, and Sunnyvale.

Of the eighteen members, fifteen are drawn from city councils and three are county supervisors; twelve are voting members and six are alternates. Five of the fifteen board members from city councils are from San Jose, which has led to criticism that the board is too heavily weighted towards one city.

Under the original proposal to form VTA in 1994, a sixteen-member board was proposed: five members directly elected, one each from the five County Supervisorial Districts; and eleven appointed from elected bodies (city councils or the county board of supervisors). The implementing legislation changed this structure to a nineteen-member board: twelve voting members, five alternates, and up to two ex-officio members, who serve as VTA's representatives to the Bay Area Metropolitan Transportation Commission. For the first ten years (1995–2004), the twelve voting members were selected as:

- 5 from the San Jose City Council
- 5 from other city councils in Santa Clara County:
  - 1 from Sunnyvale for 8 of 10 years; the remaining 2 years are filled by a member from the other Central district cities (Los Altos, Los Altos Hills, Mountain View, or Palo Alto)
  - 1 from Santa Clara for 8 of 10 years; the remaining 2 years are filled by a member from the other Central district cities
  - 1 from the Central district cities, on a rotating basis
  - 1 from the South/Eastern district cities (Gilroy, Milpitas, Morgan Hill or San Martin), on a rotating basis
  - 1 from the Western district cities (Campbell, Cupertino, Los Gatos, Monte Sereno, or Saratoga), on a rotating basis
- 2 County Supervisors

Each Board of Directors member serves a two-year term. For the non-rotating members (San Jose, Sunnyvale, Santa Clara, and County Supervisor), each member may serve multiple terms.

From 2004 to 2009, the Board had similar requirements with five San Jose City Councilmembers and two County Supervisors; the five non-San Jose city-level Board members were selected as:

- 1 from the South/Eastern district cities (Gilroy, Milpitas, Morgan Hill or San Martin), on a rotating basis
- 1 from the Western district cities (Campbell, Cupertino, Los Gatos, Monte Sereno, or Saratoga), on a rotating basis
- 3 from the Central district cities (Sunnyvale, Santa Clara, Los Altos, Los Altos Hills, Mountain View, or Palo Alto), on a rotating basis

In June 2004, a Santa Clara County Grand Jury criticized the governance structure, calling it "too large, too political, too dependent on staff, too inexperienced in some cases, and too removed from the financial and operational performance of VTA." Since VTA board members are required to be elected officials, they must juggle their other duties in addition to VTA. The Grand Jury recommended that the VTA board be shrunk to five to seven members, with members either appointed solely for transportation issues or directly elected by the voters. Grand juries in 2009 and 2019 have echoed similar complaints.

Assemblymember Marc Berman (D-Menlo Park) introduced AB 1091 on February 18, 2021, which would reduce the size of the board to nine members, of which five would be appointed by the County Supervisors, two would be from San Jose, and two would be from the remaining cities, split between the northern cities (one member from Palo Alto, Mountain View, Los Altos, Los Altos Hills, Sunnyvale, or Milpitas) and the southern cities (one member from Santa Clara, Campbell, Cupertino, Saratoga, Los Gatos, Monte Sereno, Morgan Hill, San Martin or Gilroy). Instead of the current structure, which appoints board members from elected officials, under Berman's proposed bill, the board members would be appointed from the public and serve four-year terms. AB 1091 faced significant opposition from the San Jose City Council and was tabled in May.

Berman followed up by re-introducing the VTA Board reform bill as AB 2181 on February 15, 2022. AB 2181 passed the Assembly on a 69–2 vote in May, with Assemblymembers Ash Kalra and Mark Stone opposed. Current and former VTA Board members criticized AB 2181 as not sufficiently ensuring representation from smaller cities and not addressing the root causes of VTA's low ridership.

=== General Manager and CEO ===
VTA General Manager & CEO
Name	Term
Peter Cipolla	1995 – Jun 30, 2005
Michael Burns	Aug 2005 – Dec 31, 2013
Nuria I. Fernandez	Dec 2013 – Jan 2021
Evelynn Tran (acting)	Jan 2021 – Jul 2021
Carolyn Gonot	Jul 2021 – present

Operations and management at VTA are led by the general manager and chief executive officer (GM/CEO). General cunsel Evelynn Tran served as the interim GM/CEO while the agency searched for a permanent replacement for Nuria I. Fernandez, who was appointed Deputy Administrator of the Federal Transit Administration in January 2021. Carolyn Gonot, who had served in multiple leadership roles at VTA before leaving in 2019 to head the Utah Transit Authority, was appointed the General Manager and CEO in May 2021, and began serving in July.

== Congestion management ==
VTA also serves as the Congestion Management Agency for Santa Clara County. In this role VTA makes decisions on what local projects can utilize federal and state funding, and manage sales tax revenue that is specified for VTA usages, such as 1987 Measure A and 2000 Measure A sales tax measures.

== Transit services ==
VTA operates three light rail lines, a number of bus lines, and paratransit service. VTA is a member agency of Peninsula Corridor Joint Powers Board that manages Caltrain commuter rail, providing one-third of annual operating funds and all the funding for specific improvement projects within Santa Clara County. VTA is also a member agency of Capitol Corridor Joint Powers Authority that manages Capitol Corridor intercity rail service. The VTA is responsible for building the Silicon Valley BART extension but is not a member of the Bay Area Rapid Transit District.

As VTA covers Santa Clara County in general, it serves the major core city of San Jose (where VTA is based and headquartered), with service to the other municipalities of Campbell, Cupertino, Fremont, Gilroy, Los Altos, Los Altos Hills, Los Gatos, Milpitas, Monte Sereno, Morgan Hill, Mountain View, Palo Alto, Santa Clara, San Martin, Saratoga and Sunnyvale. Only Campbell, Milpitas, Mountain View, San Jose, Santa Clara and Sunnyvale are served by light rail. The VTA partners with Highway 17 Express to provide service to Santa Cruz and with Dumbarton Express to provide transbay service between Union City and Stanford University.

=== Light rail ===
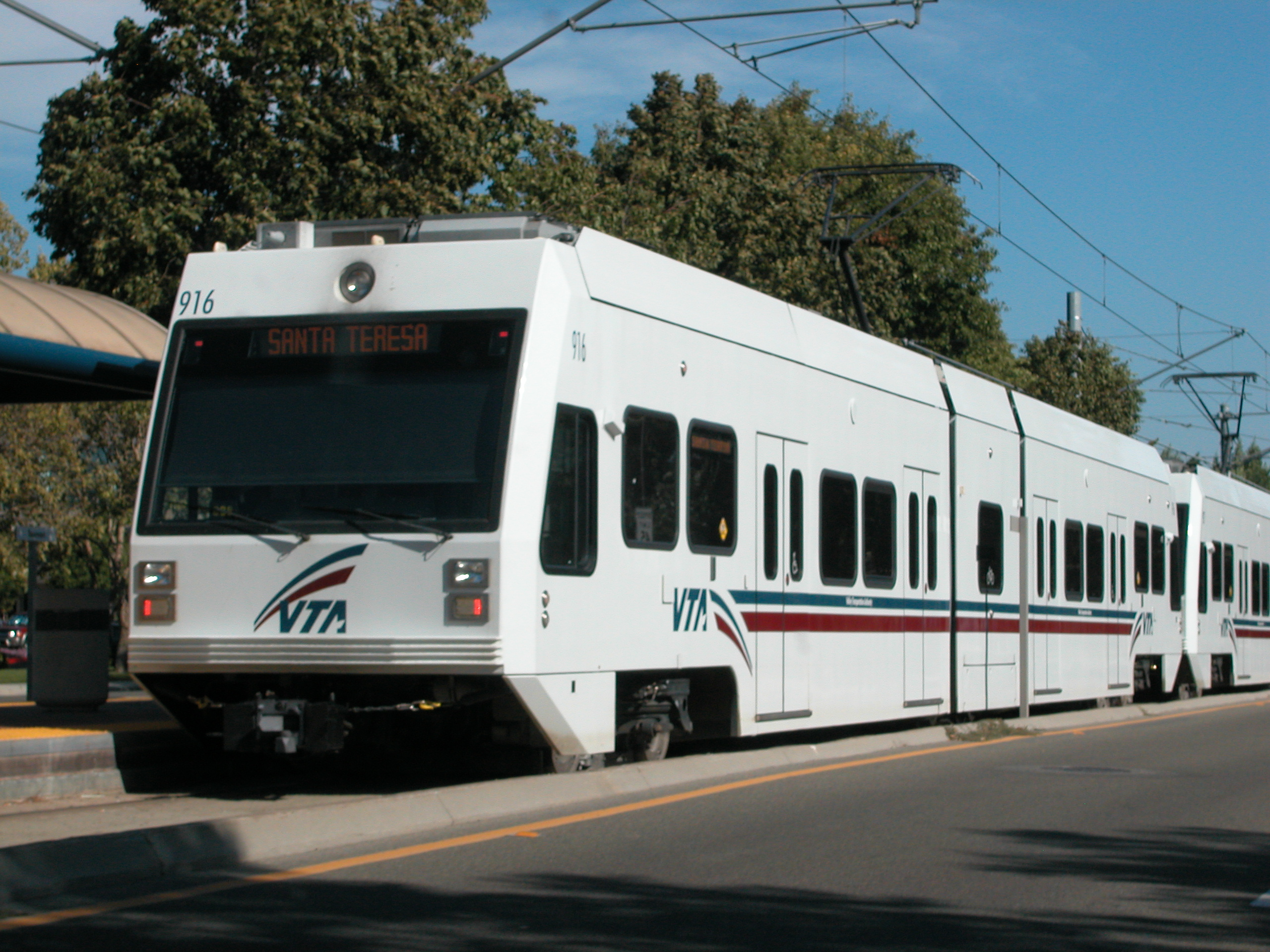
VTA low-floor light rail vehicle at Tasman Station on the Santa Teresa line

VTA Light Rail is a 42.2-mile, 60-station light rail system that opened in 1987. Built during a nationwide wave of light rail construction, the system expanded through the 1990s and early 2000s but has not added new lines since 2005, with many planned extensions canceled. However, an extension to the Eastridge Transit Center in the Evergreen District of San Jose broke ground in 2024 with service planned for 2029.

=== Bus routes ===
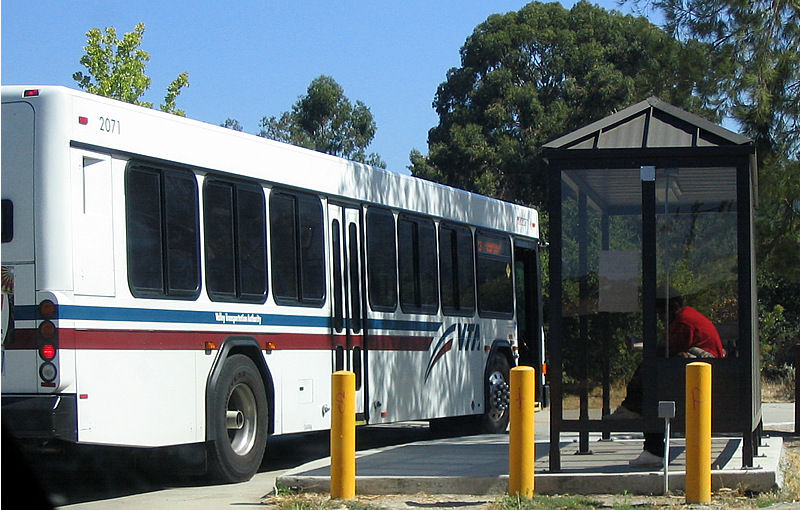
VTA bus arriving at Foothill College in Los Altos Hills

VTA operates 43 regularly operating bus routes as of January 2022, including 39 regular bus routes and 4 rapid bus routes. Many of these routes connect to VTA light rail service, and Caltrain stations. In addition, VTA operates 4 express routes, 8 school trip services, 8 free shuttle routes connecting to ACE commuter rail services, and one commuter shuttle to the Valley Medical Center

VTA's longest and most-used bus route is the 22, which connects VTA's Eastridge Transit Center in East San Jose with the Caltrain station in Palo Alto, which serves as a transfer point for SamTrans buses from San Mateo County. Line 22, prior to the COVID-19 pandemic, was the only line with 24-hour, 7 days-per-week service, including night bus service as part of the regional All-Nighter Network. Line 22's fleet of coaches primarily consists of articulated low floorbuses.

On January 14, 2008, VTA implemented major updates in its bus service. Some routes became part of a community bus network that utilizes shorter buses and charges a cheaper fee than standard bus service. Others became part of a core network with headways of 15 minutes or less. Additionally, some bus routes underwent changes in routing, while other, less-used routes were deleted completely. The agency completed another bus service redesign on December 28, 2019.

=== BRT (Bus Rapid Transit) ===
==== Current service ====
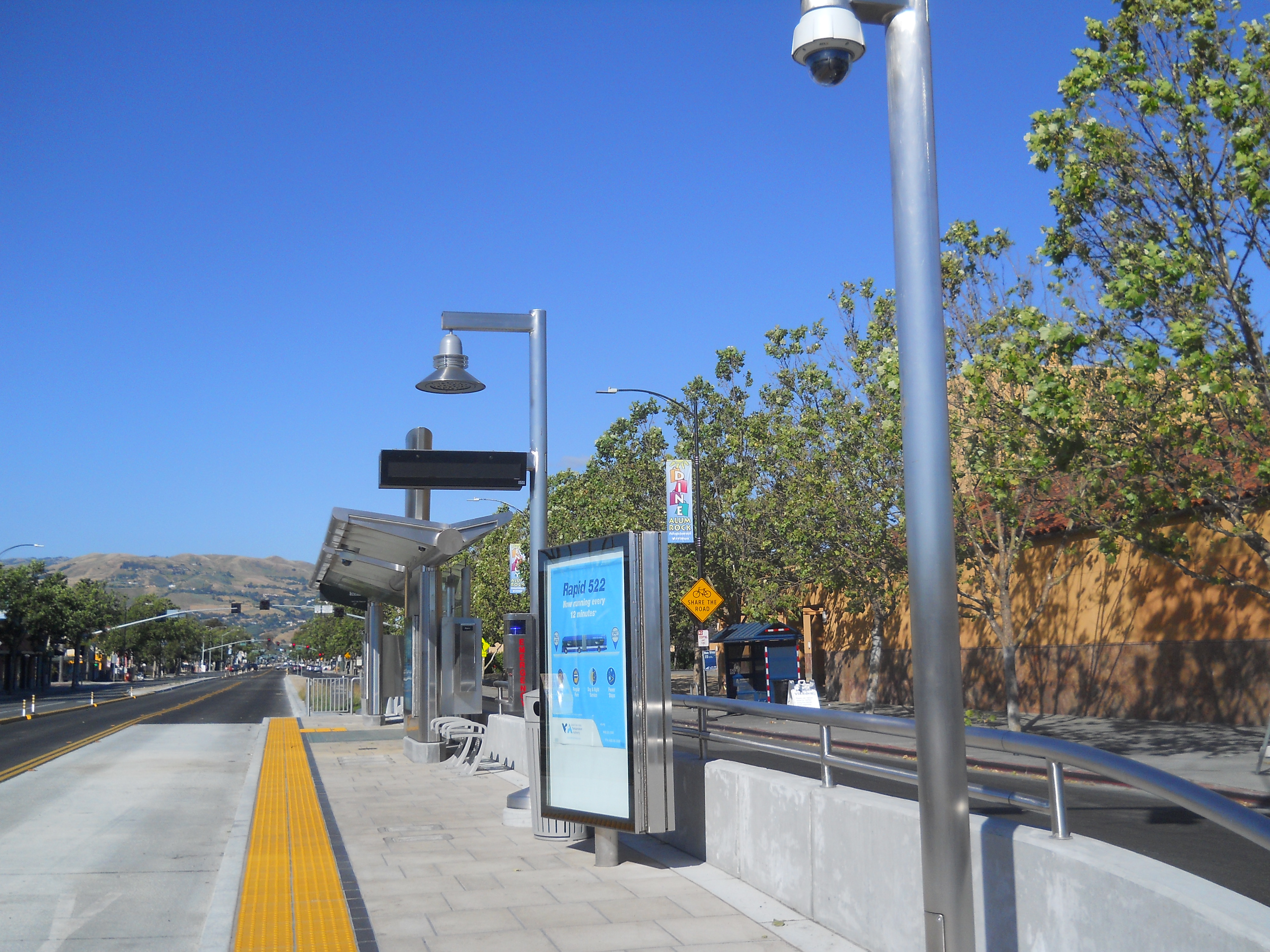
King station along Rapid 522

On July 5, 2005, VTA implemented its first rapid bus line along the VTA's busiest corridor. Modeled after the Metro Rapid service in Los Angeles, rapid bus Line 522 follows most of the Line 22 route, and features limited stops, headway based schedules, low floor fleet, and signal priority along El Camino Real. However, the current rapid bus service by VTA does not fully qualify as BRT, due to the lack of separate ticketing stations and platforms, distinctive vehicles, and special lanes which allow BRT to avoid traffic jams. Rather, it serves as a temporary rapid bus service until VTA officially opens a BRT transit corridor along the same route, which will upgrade the current 522 route.

==== Future ====
VTA had planned to add distinctive vehicles, separate bus-exclusive lanes on Alum Rock Avenue, El Camino Real, and Stevens Creek Boulevard, ticketing platforms separate from other buses, and possible amenities such as wait time for successive BRT buses by 2016 (making BRT behave more like a light rail or tram system, instead of bus service). This would also upgrade the existing 522 bus service to an official BRT, and rename the entire VTA-operated BRT service to VTA Rapid, differentiating it from VTA's buses division.

This plan involved reducing general traffic lanes from 3 lanes in each direction which was unpopular and the plans were abandoned in January 2018.

An additional rapid line, the 568, along the current route 68 replaced the previous route 168 express as part of the 2021 Service Plan. This plan was delayed until February 2022 to direct resources to reducing passenger pass-ups due to capacity limits during the COVID-19 pandemic.

=== Paratransit ===
VTA Access is the agency's paratransit service, a door-to-door shuttle service available to disabled people that meets the requirements of the 1990 Americans with Disabilities Act of 1990. MV Transportation, a for-profit agency, has been the contract paratransit broker for VTA since November 2016, after the previous broker, Outreach & Escort, was found to be overbilling the agency for its VTA Outreach service.

=== Future SJC–Diridon–DAC connector ===
VTA released a request for information in July 2019 to solicit concepts for a grade-separated system that would connect Diridon Station with the San Jose International Airport (SJC), a distance of approximately 3 miles (4.8 km). Potential SJC airport connector alignments include either an underground route following existing streets, or an aerial route partially along State Route 87. The RFI also asked potential bidders to design a continuation to De Anza College along Stevens Creek Boulevard. One major goal of the RFI was to determine if new technologies could be used to deliver a solution "at significantly lower costs than traditional transit projects."

=== Holly Trolley ===
Sometimes, in the winter, VTA operates a seasonal vintage trolley service called the Holly Trolley. This trolley, a joint project of the VTA and the California Trolley and Railroad Corporation, began operations in December 2012. As of December 2019, it operates between Civic Center and Convention Center stations, although it operated to San Jose Diridon station until 2018.

In December 2024, VTA once again operated the Holly Trolley between Diridon and Civic Center stations.

== Facilities ==
VTA sites and facilities
- Administration
- Yards
1 VTA Headquarters (3331 N First)
2 Guadalupe [Light Rail] (101 W Younger)
3 Cerone (3990 Zanker)
4 North (1235 La Avenida St, Mtn View)
5 Chaboya (2240 S 7th)

The VTA headquarters and administration offices are next to the River Oaks light rail station on North First Street in San Jose. There are four yards, three of which (Cerone, Chaboya, and North) are used for bus storage, with maintenance conducted at Cerone; the other (Guadalupe Yard) is the maintenance and storage facility for the light rail division.

== Highway improvement ==
Besides providing transit services to residents of Santa Clara County, VTA also manages countywide highway projects that use county sales tax revenues, in conjunction with Caltrans. In this role, VTA was responsible for several highway projects such as widening portions of US 101 between San Jose and Morgan Hill, and Interstate 880 within Santa Clara County. VTA will also be the leading agency in SR 152/SR 156 interchange and future widening projects.
