= Santa Clara station (VTA) =

VTA light rail station in San Jose, California

Santa Clara
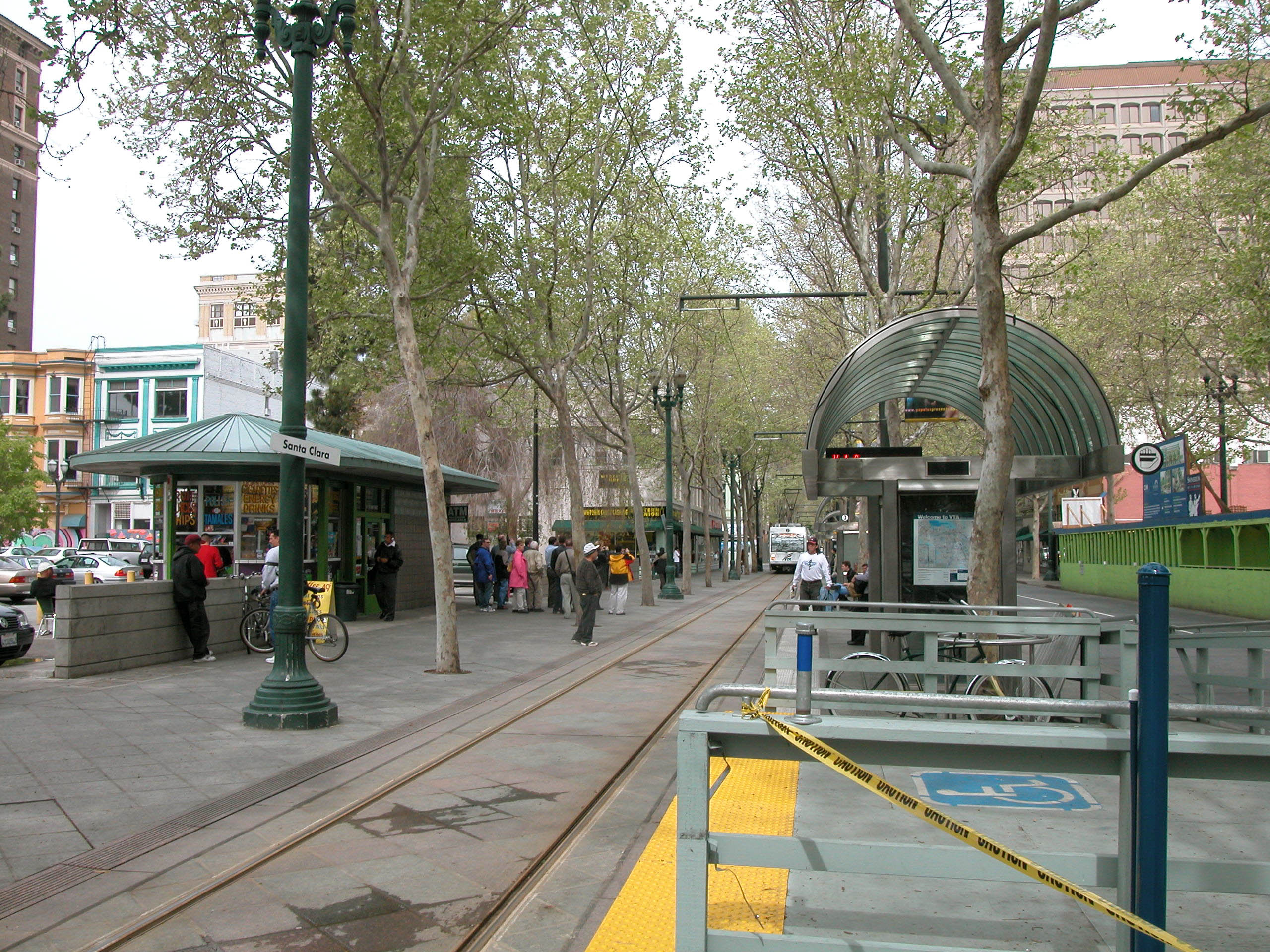
- Santa Clara station platform, March 2005

General information
- Location: Fountain Alley; San Jose, California
- Coordinates: 37°20′09″N 121°53′24″W
- Owner: Santa Clara Valley Transportation Authority
- Line: Guadalupe Phase 2
- Platforms: 2 side platforms
- Tracks: 2
- Connections: VTA Bus: 22, 23, 64A, 64B, 66, 68, 72, 73, Rapid 500, Rapid 522, Rapid 523, Rapid 568; Santa Cruz Metropolitan Transit District: Highway 17 Express

Construction
- Structure type: At-grade
- Accessible: Yes

History
- Opened: June 17, 1988
- Rebuilt: May 2007

Services
Preceding station	VTA	Following station
Saint James toward Baypointe	Blue Line	Paseo de San Antonio toward Santa Teresa
Saint James toward Old Ironsides	Green Line	Paseo de San Antonio toward Winchester
Saint James toward Civic Center	Holly Trolley Christmastime only	Paseo de San Antonio toward San Jose Diridon
Location

Santa Clara station is a light rail station operated by Santa Clara Valley Transportation Authority (VTA) located in the Historic District of Downtown San Jose, California on 1st and 2nd Streets just south of Santa Clara Street. The northbound platform is on 1st Street; the southbound platform is on 2nd Street. The platforms are connected via a pedestrian paseo called Fountain Alley. This station is served by the Blue and Green lines of the VTA light rail system.

Santa Clara station is a major transit transfer point in the VTA system. Downtown San José station, a proposed underground Bay Area Rapid Transit station, is planned to be co-located with the existing VTA station.

== History ==
VTA closed the station for refurbishment from January to May 2007 to allow level boarding at all doors, thus making the station fully wheelchair accessible.

Santa Clara station is planned as a future transfer point between BART (in the second, unfunded phase of an extension from Fremont) and VTA light rail. The BART downtown San Jose subway station is proposed to be built under Santa Clara Street.

== Notable places nearby ==
The station is within walking distance of the following notable places:

- Fountain Alley
