= Sarah Knox-Goodrich =

American suffragist (1825–1903)

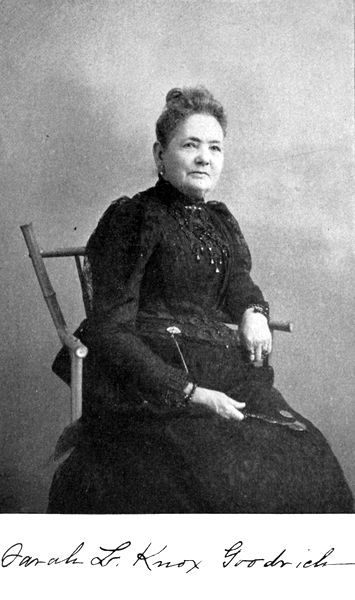
- Born: Sarah Louise Browning; February 14, 1825; Culpepper County, Virginia, U.S.
- Died: October 30, 1903 (aged 78); San Jose, California, U.S.
- Occupations: Suffragist and women's rights activist

Sarah L. Knox-Goodrich (February 14, 1825 – October 30, 1903) was a women's rights activist who worked for women's suffrage in California in the late nineteenth century. Her first husband, William Knox, was a business man, banker, and state politician. Her second husband, Levi Goodrich, was an architect in Southern California. Knox-Goodrich used her wealth and her social position to push for equal employment, school suffrage, and voting rights.

== Biography ==
Sarah Louise Browning was born in Culpepper County, Virginia, U.S., on February 14, 1825, the daughter of William Winston Browning and Sarah Smith Farrow. When Sarah was 11, her family moved to a farm in Lincoln County, Missouri.

=== Marriage to William James Knox ===
William J. Knox was born October 20, 1820, near Hopkinsville, Christian County, Kentucky, and married Sarah Browning on April 1, 1846. In 1850, they traveled to Nevada City, California by wagon train. Knox went into business selling water to gold miners during the California gold rush. In 1854, Knox was elected to the California Assembly.

In 1862, the Knoxes moved to San Jose in 1864. Knox was a co-founder and president of Santa Clara County's first bank. He was elected State Senator for Santa Clara county and, in 1866, introduced Senate Bill No. 252 that gave married women the right to control their own estate.

Knox died in San Francisco on November 13, 1867. William and Sarah had one child, Virginia, who married Cabel H. Maddox of San Francisco. Maddox was elected to the state senate in 1882.

=== Marriage to Levi Goodrich ===
Levi Goodrich was born in New York City on January 1, 1822. He studied architecture in the studio of R. G. Hatfield in New York before moving to San Jose in 1849. Goodrich was one of the first licensed architects in California. The buildings he designed include the Santa Clara County Courthouse and jail, the State Normal School, the Bank of San Jose, and the courthouses of Monterey and San Diego counties.

Sarah Knox and Goodrich married on January 15, 1879, and Sarah adopted a hyphenated form of both husband's names, Knox-Goodrich. Goodrich died in 1886 in San Diego.

Knox-Goodrich died on October 30, 1903, at her home, leaving an estate worth more than $500,000. She is buried between her two husbands.

== Suffragist activities ==
Knox-Goodrich had wealth and social position, and used them both in state campaigns for equal employment, school suffrage, protests of taxation without representation, and voting rights. Clara Shortridge Foltz, the first female lawyer on the West Coast, said of her, "Mrs. Knox is a widow of commanding personal appearance, an abundance of bank stock, and a wealth of . . . common sense, which she displayed at the polls on last Wednesday by protesting against 'taxation without representation.'"

Knox-Goodrich worked with her first husband in getting the Senate Bill 252 passed in the state legislature. In 1869, she organized San Jose's first Women's Suffrage Association; by 1876, it had 200 members. On the Fourth of July in 1876, Knox, "determined to make a manifestation", filled her carriage with prominent friends carrying signs that read "We are the disfranchised Class", "We are Taxed without being Represented", and "We are governed without our Consent". She had requested a position at the back of the parade, next to the African-Americans but ahead of the Chinese immigrants, as an illustration of women's legal position, but the parade organizers insisted on her carriage being placed at the front.

In 1874, Knox-Goodrich spearheaded a bill making women eligible to run for educational office, such as school boards, even though they could not vote. She, and her co-lobbyists, traveled to Sacramento and stayed there for a month, supporting the passage of the bill in the State Assembly. In 1877, Knox-Goodrich nominated herself for an Assembly seat. In 1880, she petitioned the Assembly for relief from political disabilities:

I, Sarah L. Knox-Goodrich, a citizen of the United States, a resident of the State of California, City of San José, County of Santa Clara, hereby respectfully petition your honorable body for the removal of her political disabilities, that she may exercise her right to vote, all State constitutions and statute laws to the contrary notwithstanding. Your petitioner respectfully represents that she is a real estate owner, paying heavy taxes annually for public improvements, and of the support of a government in which she has no representation....

— January 22, 1880

The petition failed.

Knox-Goodrich was an officer in the California Suffrage Constitutional Amendment Campaign Association (formed in 1895) and the joint campaign committee (formed in 1896). Both committees were formed to direct and support the campaign to amend the California state constitution, giving women the vote. Knox-Goodrich hosted Susan B. Anthony at her home, and then accompanied Anthony to Sacramento as a member of the woman suffrage delegation for the state Republican convention.

In addition to these activities, Knox-Goodrich donated money to women's rights causes. In 1888, she donated money for the founding meeting of the International Council of Women. She gave $100 to help clear the debt from the 1895 women's suffrage campaign and $500 to fund the 1896 constitutional amendment campaign. She also contributed to travel and expenses of other women working for women's suffrage. In 1889, Knox-Goodrich and Ellen Clark Sargent paid for Laura de Force Gordon, a journalist and leader of the California Women's Suffrage Society, to give a series of lectures in the Washington Territory.

Knox-Goodrich was a frequent contributor to Woman's Journal, the San Jose Mercury, and the New Northwest.

== Knox-Goodrich Building ==
- Knox-Goodrich Building
- U.S. Historic district – Contributing property
- Location: 34 South 1st Street, San Jose, California, U.S.
- Coordinates: 37°20′8.17″N 121°53′23.05″W
- Built: 1889
- Architect: George W. Page
- Architectural style: Richardsonian Romanesque
- Part of: Downtown Historic District (San Jose, California) (ID83003822)
- Added to NRHP: May 26, 1983

Knox-Goodrich commissioned a building on property left to her by her first husband. The building, designed by George W. Page, was commercial on the first floor, and a rooming house on the second and third floors. Its Romanesque Revival features include rusticated masonry walls, massive stone piers, carved stone detailing, and Byzantine capitals. There is a parapet over the third-floor windows with a carved 'G' and a 'K' intertwined, and the date '1889' is carved over the second story windows.

A plaque on the building states,

This charming commercial structure was built in 1889 by Sarah Knox-Goodrich on property left to her by her first husband, Dr. William Knox, using sandstone from the quarry owned by her second husband, Levi Goodrich. Both men were important San Jose citizens: Knox, with his brother-in-law T. Ellard Beans, established San Jose's first bank; Goodrich was the architect of the Santa Clara County Courthouse. Sarah Knox-Goodrich, a strong advocate of women's rights, organized San Jose's first Women's Suffrage Association in 1869. She died in 1903 and was buried between her two husbands at Oak Hill Cemetery

In 2019, the building was purchased by Urban Catalyst as part of a development plan for the Fountain Alley area. The project includes construction of a mixed retail/office building that will renovate the Knox-Goodrich building and incorporate it as an entrance.

== See also ==
- Downtown Historic District (San Jose, California)

== Sources ==
- Munro-Fraser, J. P. (1881). History of Santa Clara County, California: Including Its Geography, Geology, Topography, Climatography and Description ... San Francisco, California: Alley, Bowen, & Company.
