= Saint James station (VTA) =

VTA light rail station in San Jose, California

Saint James
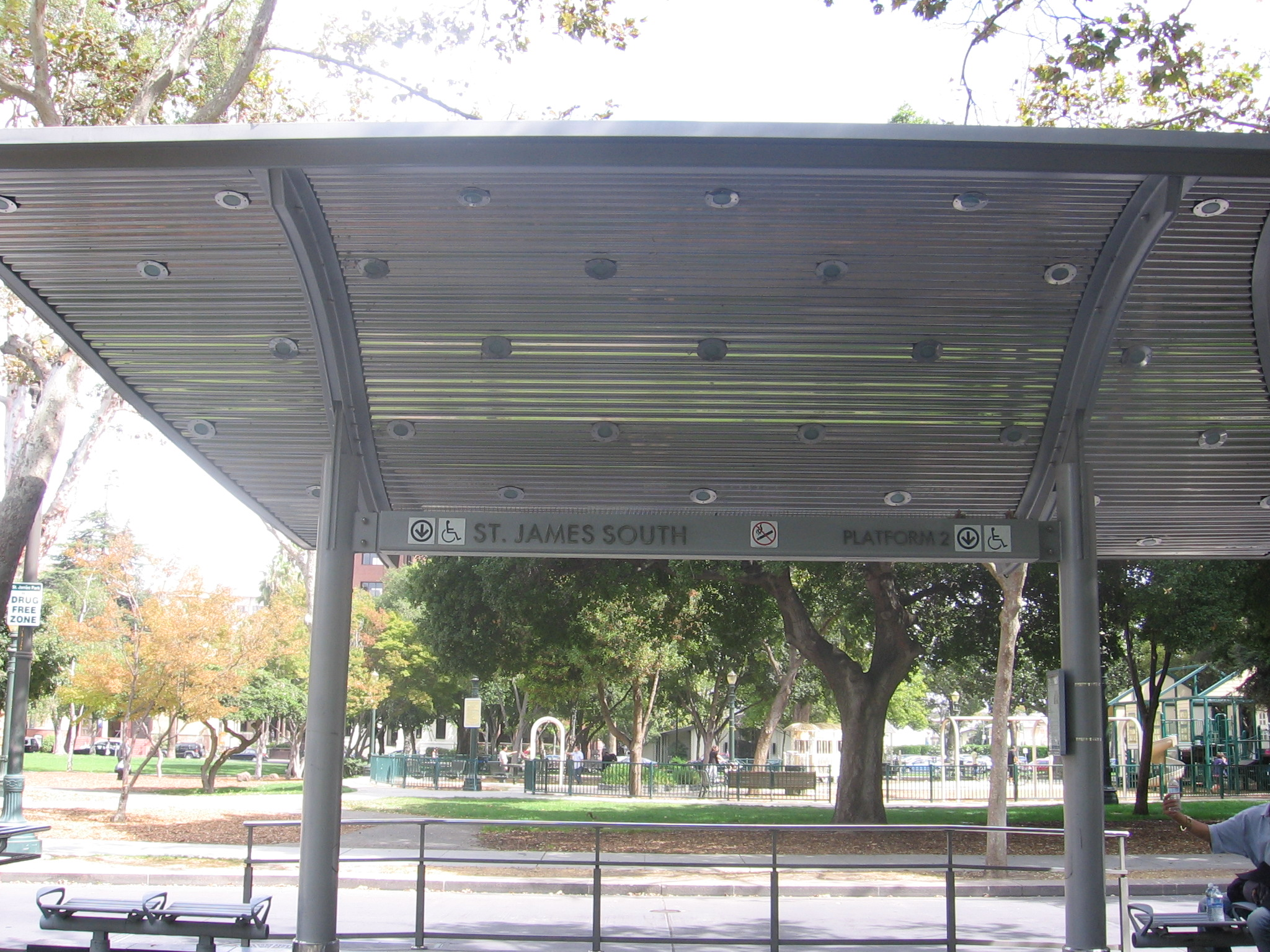
- The southbound platform of Saint James station

General information
- Location: 150 North First Street (northbound); 101 North Second Street (southbound); San Jose, California
- Coordinates: 37°20′17″N 121°53′31″W
- Owner: Santa Clara Valley Transportation Authority
- Line: Guadalupe Phase 2
- Platforms: 2 side platforms
- Tracks: 2
- Connections: VTA Bus: 72, 73

Construction
- Structure type: At-grade
- Accessible: Yes

History
- Opened: June 17, 1988
- Rebuilt: 2006

Services
Preceding station	VTA	Following station
Japantown/Ayer toward Baypointe	Blue Line	Santa Clara toward Santa Teresa
Japantown/Ayer toward Old Ironsides	Green Line	Santa Clara toward Winchester
Japantown/Ayer toward Civic Center	Holly Trolley Christmastime only	Santa Clara toward San Jose Diridon
Location

Saint James station is a light rail station operated by Santa Clara Valley Transportation Authority. The station is located in Downtown San Jose, California on 1st and 2nd Streets between Saint James and Saint John Streets. The northbound platform is on 1st Street (the address is 150 N. First Street); the southbound platform is on 2nd Street (the address is 101 N. Second Street). This station is served by the Blue and Green lines of the VTA light rail system. The platforms at Saint James station are separated by the western half of the historic St. James Park.

Saint James station was renovated in 2006 to permit level entry at all doors.

== Notable places nearby ==
The station is within walking distance of the following notable places:

- San Pedro Square
- St. James Park
