= 27–29 Fountain Alley =

Historic building in California, United States

- U.S. National Register of Historic Places
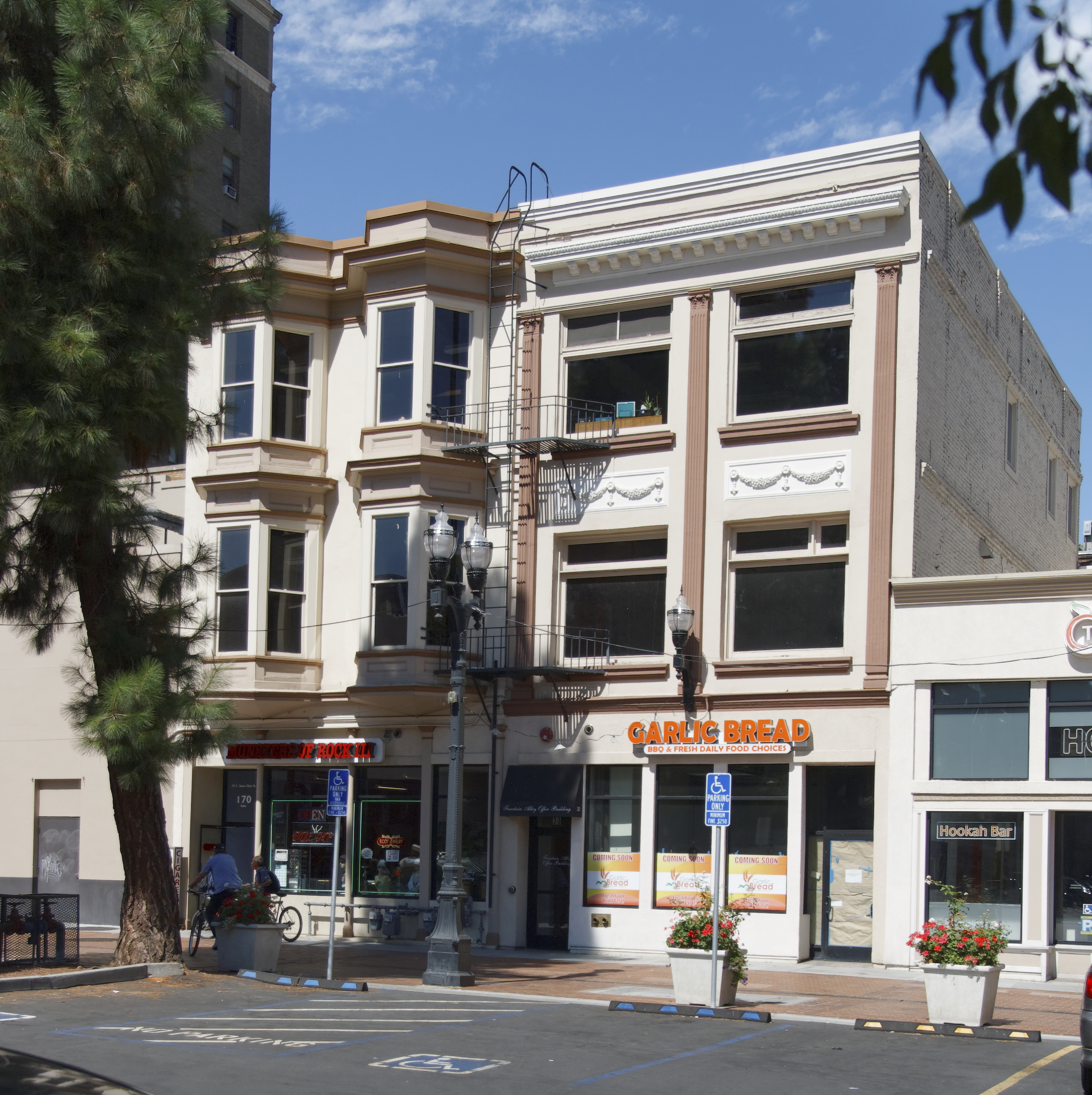
- Fountain Alley Office Building

- Location within San Jose, California
- Location: San Jose, California, US
- Coordinates: 37°20′10″N 121°53′23″W
- Built: 1889
- Built by: R. H. Quincy
- Architect: J.O. McKee
- Architectural style: Victorian
- NRHP reference No.: 82002265
- Added to NRHP: March 2, 1982

27–29 Fountain Alley is a historic commercial building located in San Jose, California. The building is architecturally significant as the only representative of late Victorian-style in this area. Its historically important for its association with Fountain Alley, one of San Jose's oldest streets. The Fountain Alley building at 27–29 Fountain Alley was placed on the National Register of Historic Places on March 2, 1982.

== History ==
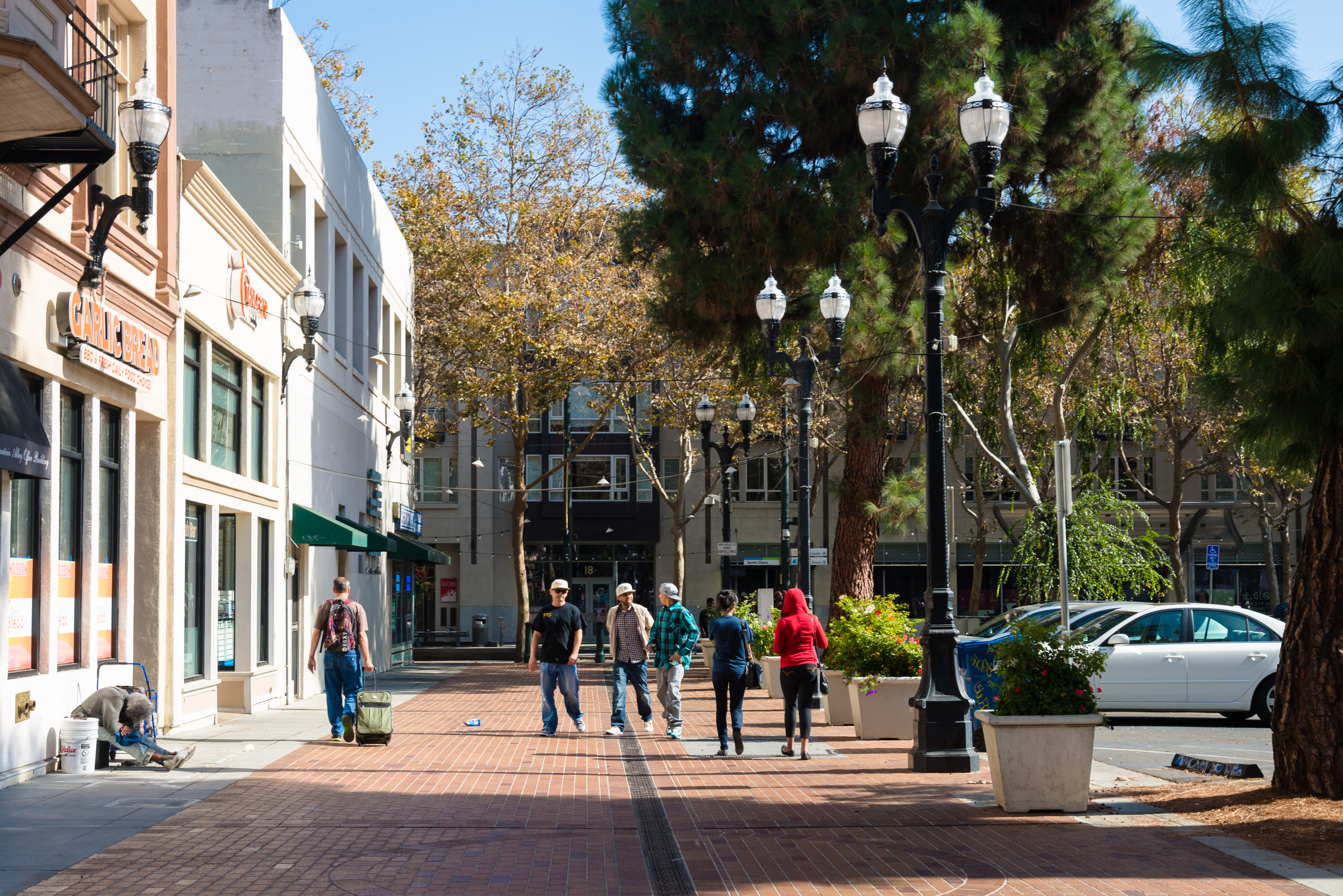
Fountain Alley, San Jose, California

The building at 27–29 Fountain Alley is a three-story brick commercial structure, located between First and Second Streets in Downtown San Jose. It occupies a lot measuring 23.5 ft (7.2 m) by 57.15 ft (17.42 m). Its façade has a pair of two-story bay windows that extend over the first story. Cornices at the roof level and between the bays add definition to its floor and roofline.

The inside of the building features a tin ceiling with a deep cove cornice. The narrow staircase on the east side of the building has turned balusters and leads to the upper floors. In a recent rehabilitation, the partitions on the second and third floors were removed, transforming the space into larger areas. All doors are crafted from pine with redwood panels, and the moldings showcase the Queen Anne-style. Plain brick walls are on the north end of the building, while iron shutters protect the door and window openings in the rear wall. Two skylights are located on the third floor.

During a period of the city's expansion, R. H. Quincy erected the brick Fountain Alley building in 1889.

Over time, the building has hosted a range of commercial ventures, one of which being J.L. Chargin restaurant that occupied the building between 1905-1935. Since 1935, the ground floor has accommodated various service-oriented businesses, including a tavern, a liquor store, and most recently, a beauty shop. Initially, the second and third floors served as lodgings and boarding rooms. However, since 1950, the upper floors have remained unoccupied. Between 1965 and 1969, the ground floor commercial space remained unoccupied. By 1969, the latest utilization of the ground floor was as a beauty salon.

In 1998, the city approved $100 million downtown revitalization project to attract more shops and restaurants to Fountain Alley district on First and Second streets between Santa Clara and San Fernando streets. Today Fountain Alley Building at 27-29 Fountain Alley is part of the city's proposed mixed-use San Jose Fountain Alley project.

== Historical significance ==
27–29 Fountain Alley was placed on the National Register of Historic Places on March 2, 1982. The Fountain Alley building holds historical significance in architecture because it is the only representative of Italianate design and late Victorian-style in this area. Its historically important for its association with Fountain Alley, one of San Jose's oldest streets.

== See also ==
- National Register of Historic Places listings in Santa Clara County, California
- Downtown Historic District (San Jose, California)

== Bibliography ==
- Sanborn Fire Insurance Maps, 1884, 1889, 1901, 1921, 1930, 1945
- San Jose Mercury News, 6-15-41, 6-18-71, 12-24-71, 9-14-73
- San Jose Historical Museum Photo Archive
- San Jose Historical Museum San Jose City Directories 1870-1970
- History of Santa Clara County
