= Eugene Michael Hyman =

American judge (born 1950)

Eugene M. Hyman
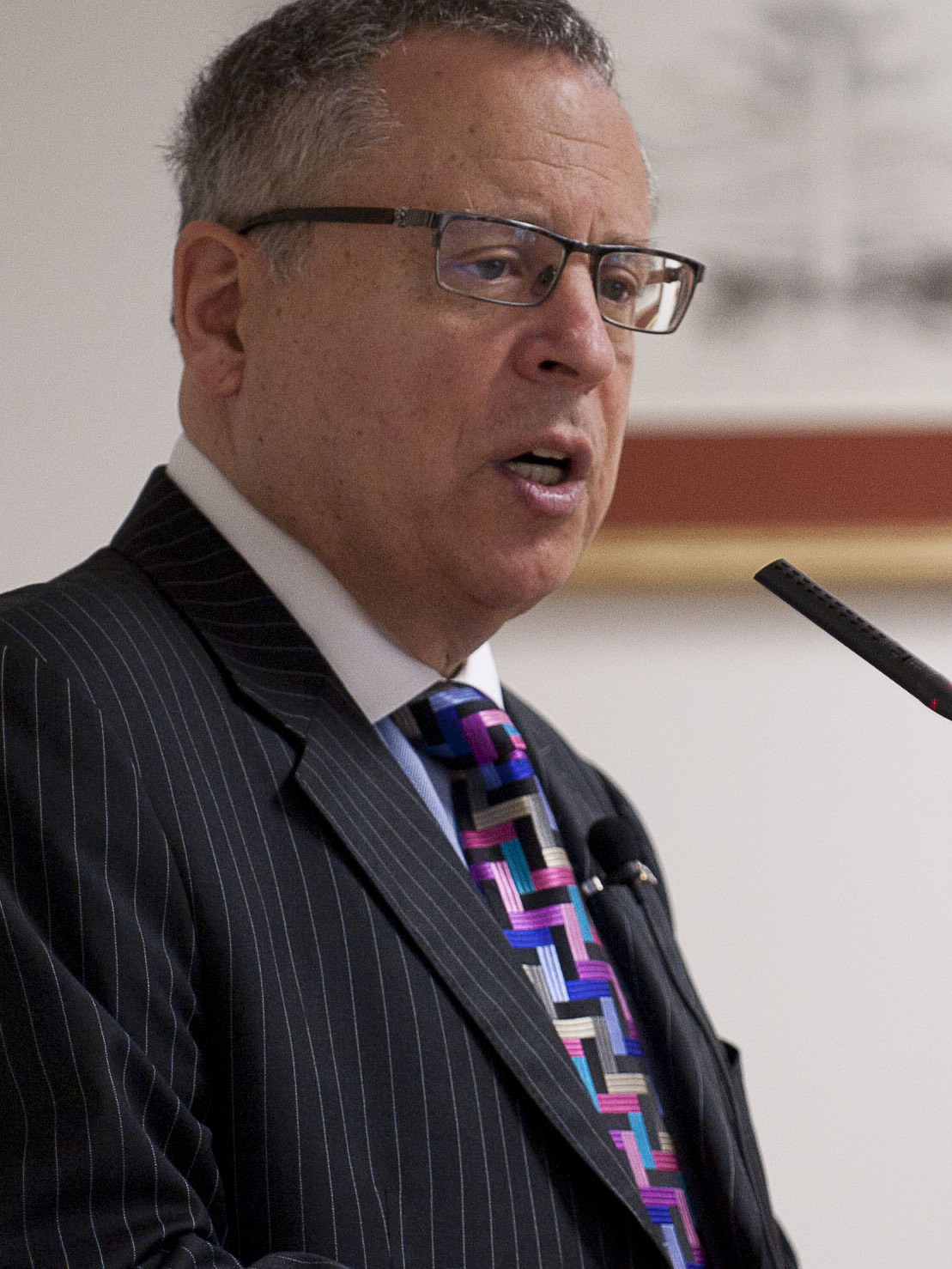

Judge of the Superior Court of Santa Clara County
- In office January 8, 1997 – 2011
- Succeeded by: Shelyna V. Brown

Judge of the Municipal Court of Santa Clara County
- In office 1990–1996

Personal details
- Born: Eugene Michael Hyman; May 14, 1950 (age 76) Perth Amboy, New Jersey, U.S.
- Education: Claremont Men’s College (BA); Santa Clara University (JD)

Eugene Michael Hyman (born May 14, 1950) is an American retired judge, lawyer, and former police officer. Besides being a retired judge and former police officer, he now also serves as an expert witness in the field of domestic violence, in the criminal and civil courts.

Hyman served as judge for over twenty years, combining municipal and the Superior Court of Santa Clara County. He helped create juvenile domestic and family violence juvenile court in Santa Clara County, believed to be the first therapeutic court in the United States in the field of therapeutic jurisprudence. Hyman has presided over cases in the criminal, family, probate, civil, and delinquency divisions of the court. Hyman was elected to the Superior Court and took the oath of office on January 8, 1997. He served on the court until his retirement, after which he was succeeded by Shelyna V. Brown. He helped establish the Superior Court, which became the first American court to receive the United Nations Public Service Award. Hyman presided over the first family/juvenile violence court in the United States to focus exclusively on teenage victims and perpetrators.

== Early life, education and career ==
Hyman graduated from Matawan Regional High School in 1968. He graduated from Claremont Men's College with a Bachelor of Arts in sociology, graduating cum laude in 1972. He received his Juris Doctor degree from the Santa Clara University School of Law in 1977.

From 1972 to 1977, he served as a police officer with the Santa Clara Police Department and from 1979 to 1981 he was an Instructor at the Santa Clara County Peace Officer's Academy.

== Legal career ==
He was in private practice from 1979 to 1990 concentrating on personal injury litigation, workers' compensation law, and criminal law. For over a decade, he represented clients in workers' compensation law. His practice encompassed both civil and criminal proceedings, allowing him to gain extensive courtroom experience before his judicial appointment.

Alongside his legal practice, Hyman began teaching law at Santa Clara University School of Law for over 30 years. Throughout the 1980s and 1990s he taught Workers' Compensation Law, Law Office Management, Community Property Law, Juvenile Law, Domestic Violence Law, and California Post-Conviction Practice. His courses combined legal doctrine with practical courtroom experience and emphasized the interaction between legal institutions and social services.

== Judicial career ==
=== 1990 to present ===
In 1990, Hyman was appointed to the Santa Clara County Municipal Court. In 1990, Hyman was appointed as a judge of the Municipal Court of Santa Clara County, California. During his six years on the municipal bench, he presided over criminal, civil, traffic, and misdemeanor matters while developing an interest in judicial practices that addressed the underlying causes of offending behavior rather than relying solely on traditional punitive sanctions. His courtroom management emphasized fairness, procedural integrity, and evidence-based decision-making, particularly in cases involving families, juveniles, and repeat offenders.

In 1997, following his election, Hyman became a judge of the Superior Court of California, County of Santa Clara, serving until his retirement in 2011. During his fourteen years on the superior court, he presided over juvenile, family, criminal, and collaborative justice assignments. His judicial work increasingly focused on domestic violence, child abuse, juvenile delinquency, adolescent relationship violence, and therapeutic interventions designed to reduce recidivism.

Unlike many judges whose work remained confined to courtroom adjudication, Hyman became actively involved in judicial policy development, interdisciplinary collaboration, and judicial education. His philosophy held that courts should function not only as institutions that resolve disputes but also as public institutions capable of reducing future violence through coordinated intervention involving law enforcement, educators, social workers, medical professionals, and community organizations.

=== Juvenile Domestic and Family Violence Court ===
Hyman is best known for establishing the Santa Clara County Juvenile Domestic and Family Violence Court, regarded as one of the first specialized juvenile domestic violence courts in the United States. Developed during the late 1990s and early 2000s, the court addressed violence committed by adolescents against dating partners or family members through an integrated model combining judicial supervision with education, counseling, victim advocacy, and behavioral intervention.

Under Hyman's leadership, the court adopted a multidisciplinary approach that brought together prosecutors, defense attorneys, probation officers, educators, mental health professionals, victim advocates, batterer intervention specialists, and community organizations. Rather than emphasizing punishment alone, the court sought to promote offender accountability while reducing the likelihood of future violence through early intervention and rehabilitation.

The program incorporated judicial monitoring, mandatory participation in counseling and educational programs, individualized treatment plans, and close collaboration among agencies responsible for child welfare, education, probation, and victim services. Hyman argued that adolescence represented a critical period during which intervention could prevent violent behavioral patterns from continuing into adulthood.

The Santa Clara model attracted national and international attention and became the subject of academic research, judicial conferences, and policy discussions. It was later cited as an example of collaborative justice and problem-solving courts that addressed complex social problems through coordinated institutional responses rather than conventional adversarial proceedings.

=== Domestic violence jurisprudence ===
During his judicial tenure, Hyman became one of California's leading judicial authorities on domestic violence law. His decisions, lectures, publications, and judicial education programs focused on improving court responses to intimate partner violence, child abuse, elder abuse, stalking, and adolescent relationship violence.

Hyman frequently argued that traditional assumptions regarding why victims remained in abusive relationships often misunderstood the realities of domestic violence and could result in ineffective judicial decision-making.

=== International career after retirement (2011–present) ===
Following his retirement from the Superior Court of California in 2011, Hyman embarked on an international career as a legal scholar, judicial educator, consultant, and expert on domestic violence, juvenile justice, therapeutic jurisprudence, and collaborative justice. Building on more than two decades of judicial experience, he advised governments, courts, universities, international organizations, and judicial education institutes throughout North America, Europe, Australia, New Zealand, and the Caribbean. His post-retirement work focused on improving judicial responses to family violence through evidence-based policy, interdisciplinary collaboration, and judicial education.

One of Hyman's earliest international appointments came in 2013, when he served as an International Juvenile Law Expert for the United Nations Development Programme (UNDP) in Belarus. As part of a judicial modernization initiative, he collaborated with international legal experts in reviewing proposals concerning court organization and juvenile justice reform. Hyman prepared a comprehensive review of juvenile justice policy and judicial administration, identifying institutional reforms consistent with international legal standards on children's rights. He subsequently travelled to Minsk, where he presented his findings during a roundtable attended by judges, government officials, United Nations representatives, and legal scholars.

In 2014, Hyman was appointed consultant to the Juvenile Justice Reform Project of the Organisation of Eastern Caribbean States (OECS), an initiative funded by the United States Agency for International Development (USAID) and administered by the National Center for State Courts. Working with governments across Antigua and Barbuda, Dominica, Grenada, Saint Kitts and Nevis, Saint Lucia, and Saint Vincent and the Grenadines, he reviewed judicial training materials and advised policymakers on juvenile court administration, rehabilitation programs, restorative justice, and youth violence prevention. His recommendations emphasized balancing accountability with rehabilitation while strengthening collaboration between courts, educators, mental health professionals, and community agencies.

Australia became the principal focus of Hyman's international work during the following decade. Beginning in the early 2010s, he developed long-standing collaborations with Australian universities, judicial institutes, police agencies, legal aid organizations, and state governments on domestic and family violence reform. In 2015, he appeared as an expert witness before Victoria's Royal Commission into Family Violence, where he provided evidence concerning intervention orders, specialist domestic violence courts, offender accountability, and judicial management of high-risk family violence cases. Drawing upon his experience establishing the Santa Clara County Juvenile Domestic and Family Violence Court, Hyman advocated coordinated responses involving courts, police, victim advocates, and treatment providers.

Hyman also served as a consultant to the Australian Institute of Judicial Administration (AIJA) during the development of the National Domestic and Family Violence Bench Book, providing comparative analysis of American and Australian legal practice, reviewing draft chapters, and advising on judicial education, victim safety, risk assessment, and evidence-based intervention. The Bench Book subsequently became Australia's principal online judicial resource on domestic and family violence.

Between 2015 and 2020, Hyman lectured widely in Australia, delivering judicial education and professional training on domestic violence courts, therapeutic jurisprudence, coercive control, implicit bias, and multidisciplinary approaches to family violence. He spoke at programs organized by judicial, legal, academic, and law-enforcement organizations, including the Australasian Institute of Judicial Administration, Bond University, the University of Melbourne, and Victoria Legal Aid.

His academic involvement in Australia culminated in his appointment as Adjunct Associate Professor at the University of Canberra School of Law, where he served for three months in early 2019.while also holding the position of Director of Professional Outreach. In these roles, Hyman contributed to undergraduate legal education, professional engagement, curriculum development, and research concerning domestic violence law, therapeutic jurisprudence, and legal reform. He collaborated with Australian legal scholars on projects relating to family violence intervention, trauma-informed judicial practice, and interdisciplinary legal education.

Hyman also established close professional relationships with New Zealand's legal community. He presented a continuing legal education seminar for the New Zealand Law Society, lectured at Auckland University of Technology and Victoria University of Wellington, and participated in public policy forums examining criminal justice reform, family violence, incarceration, and rehabilitation. His lectures frequently addressed specialist domestic violence courts, adolescent dating violence, judicial specialization, evidence-based sentencing, and information sharing between justice agencies.

In the United States, Hyman continued to play an active role in judicial education through his work with Legal Momentum's National Judicial Education Program. He advised the organization on educational initiatives concerning intimate partner sexual abuse, adolescent dating violence, and judicial responses to family violence, contributing to training programs designed to improve judicial understanding of coercive control, trauma, victim safety, and evidence-based decision-making.

Throughout the 2010s and 2020s, Hyman served as an expert witness and consultant on domestic violence, juvenile justice, family courts, collaborative justice, and specialized problem-solving courts. His expertise was sought by courts, universities, judicial institutes, and government agencies in Australia, Canada, Germany, New Zealand, and the Caribbean. His consulting work focused on specialist domestic violence courts, offender intervention programs, judicial administration, court management, and multidisciplinary approaches to reducing family violence.

Alongside his consulting and academic work, Hyman continued to write extensively on domestic violence law, criminal justice reform, judicial ethics, family law, and public policy. He authored numerous scholarly articles as well as opinion pieces for publications including the San Jose Mercury News, Daily Journal, The Wall Street Journal, The Washington Post, and other legal and national newspapers, addressing subjects such as judicial independence, sentencing reform, child protection, domestic violence prevention, evidence-based criminal justice policy, and electoral reform relating to sheriffs and judges.

Hyman's post-retirement career transformed him from a state trial judge into an internationally recognized authority on judicial education, therapeutic jurisprudence, and domestic violence law. Through consulting, scholarship, teaching, and public advocacy, he has continued to influence legal practice, judicial policy, and court reform initiatives internationally, extending the impact of his judicial innovations well beyond his years on the California bench.

=== Television analyst ===
Hyman has appeared on television and radio shows as a legal analyst. In 2009, he analyzed the potential domestic violence case concerning Chris Brown and Rihanna. During December 2009, Hyman stated "A large percentage of [DCFS] cases that are investigated are never filed with a court; Such a scenario is particularly likely given the family's celebrity status" inre Charlie Sheen's domestic problems.

In 2010, Hyman was interviewed concerning the death of Allison Myrick and commented on how the legal system fails abusive relationships.

== Legal conferences participation ==
In 2003, Hyman was a panelist on domestic violence the 30th annual Western Society of Criminology in Vancouver, British Columbia, Canada.

During May 2010, Hyman was on the "Developing Therapeutic Judging Panel" representing problem-focused domestic violence courts in East Melbourne, Victoria.

== Academic relationship ==
Hyman is also a lecturer at the Santa Clara University School of Law, where he has taught a Domestic Violence Law Seminar. He has over 30 years of experience as a law instructor.

In 1994, he served as a member of part-time Faculty at the Santa Clara University College of Arts & Sciences teaching Senior Seminar Law and Social Welfare.

In January 2005, as a Visiting Professor in Law, he taught Domestic Violence Law at the University of Western Ontario Faculty of Law in Canada.

For three months in 2019, he has served as an Adjunct Associate Professor at the University of Canberra School of Law and serves as the Director of Professional Outreach at the school.

== Awards ==
- "Judge Eugene M. Hyman named a Local Heroe" on YouTube (April, 2011). Cable Channel 30 airs stories of people who help to make positive changes in our community.
- The Santa Clara County Domestic Violence Council recognizes Honorable Eugene M. Hyman for his extraordinary commitment and leadership in the arenas of domestic violence and for his role as community leader and inspiration to others. October 15, 2010.
- "Alumni Achievement Award," University of Santa Clara, School of Law, 2003
- On June 23, 2008, Hyman, along with the Santa Clara County Superior Court was honored with the United Nations Public Service Award. On the same day in the United States House of Representatives, Zoe Lofgren recognized Hyman for the United Nations award.
- In 2004, The Superior Court of California, County of Santa Clara, announced that its Juvenile Domestic and Family Violence Court has been chosen as one of the "Top 50" programs in the 2004 Innovations in American Government Awards competition. Read the press release here.
- "Unsung Heroes" Award from the Victims Support Network, 2004.
- "Alumni Achievement Award," University of Santa Clara, School of Law, 2003
- Inductee, Matawan Regional High School Hall of Fame/Alumni. 2003
- In 2001, The Superior Court of California's Juvenile Domestic and Family Violence Court, headed by Judge Eugene M. Hyman, was honored by the California State Administrative office as a recipient of the Ralph N. Kleps Award for improvement in the administration of the courts.
- Director's Award, The Human Relations Commission and the Office of Human Relations of Santa Clara County, 2001
- Seventh Annual LACY (Legal Advocates for Children & Youth) Honors for the improvement of legal representation for minors, 2000.
- Patron, The Australian Institute of Public Safety, Melbourne, Australia
- Women's Fund "Man of the Year 1998." Recognized for efforts in domestic violence prevention.
