= Sainte Claire Club =

Private gentlemen's club in San Jose, California, United States

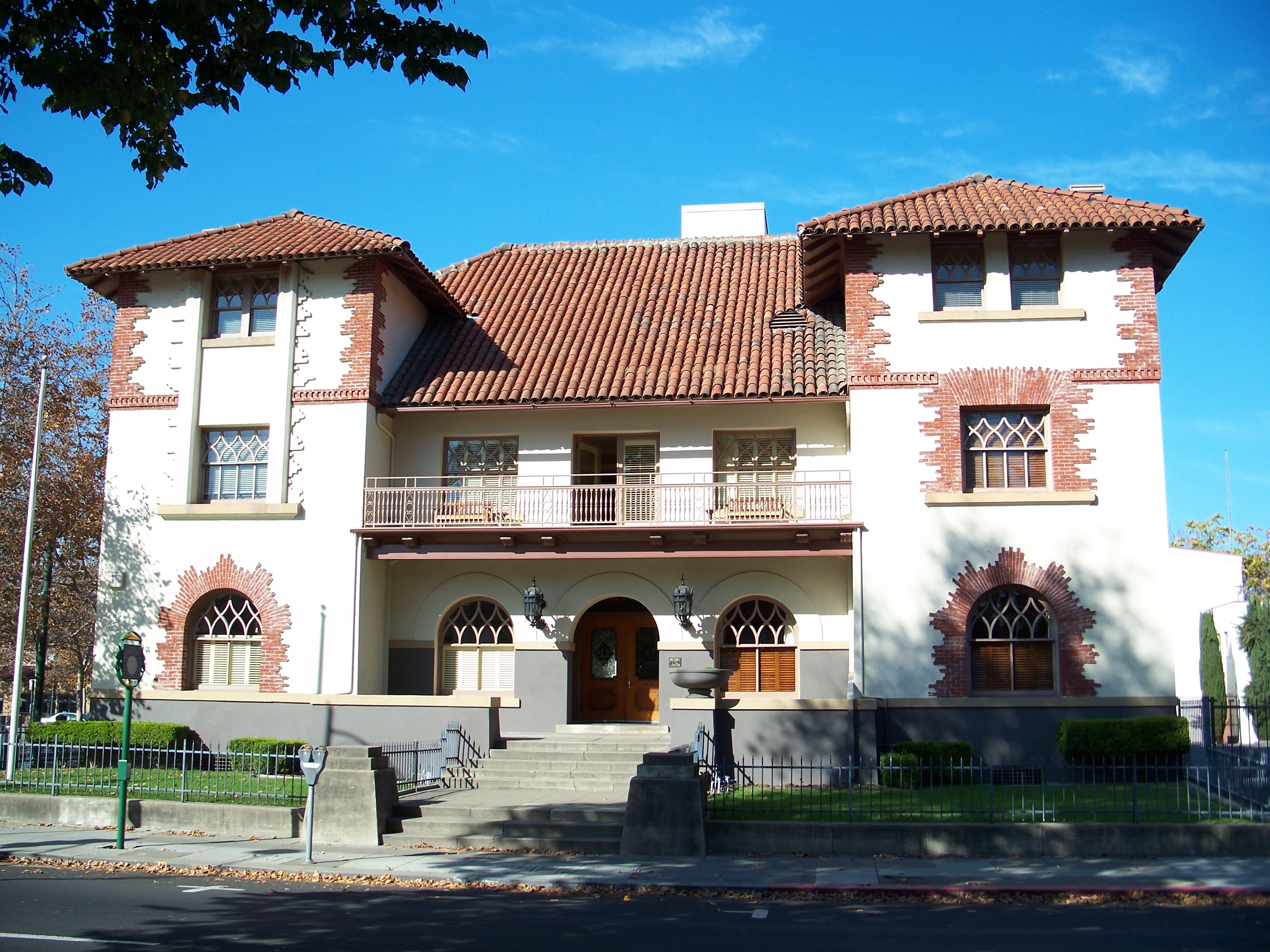
- Formation: October 16, 1888; 137 years ago
- Type: Private Men's Social Club, 501(c)(7)
- Purpose: Leisure, recreation
- Headquarters: 65 East St. James Street, San Jose, California, U.S.
- Coordinates: 37.33992°N 121.891597°W
- Website: www.sainteclaireclub.org

The Sainte Claire Club is a private gentlemen's club established in 1888 and located in the St. James Square Historic District in San Jose, California, United States. It is one of the oldest clubs in the state of California.

== History ==
The Sainte Claire Club was founded on October 16, 1888, with twenty members with R. E. Pearce serving as president. It is an all-male club, with an initiation fee.

The building headquarters was designed by architect A. Page Brown in a Mission Revival style and completed in 1893; the club moved into the building in June 1894. It was damaged in the 1906 San Francisco earthquake, and restored a year later.

From 2020 to 2024, the club battled the city in court over design plans for St. James Park, which included a new outdoor pavilion to host some 5,000 people, and they won their lawsuit.

The Sainte Claire Historic Preservation Foundation (SCHPF) is a 501(c)3 organization raising funds to preserve the building. The Sainte Claire Club has a historical marker, erected by the City of San Jose.
