= Independent Order of Odd Fellows Building (San Diego) =

Historic building in San Diego, California, U.S.

- U.S. National Register of Historic Places
- San Diego Historic Landmark
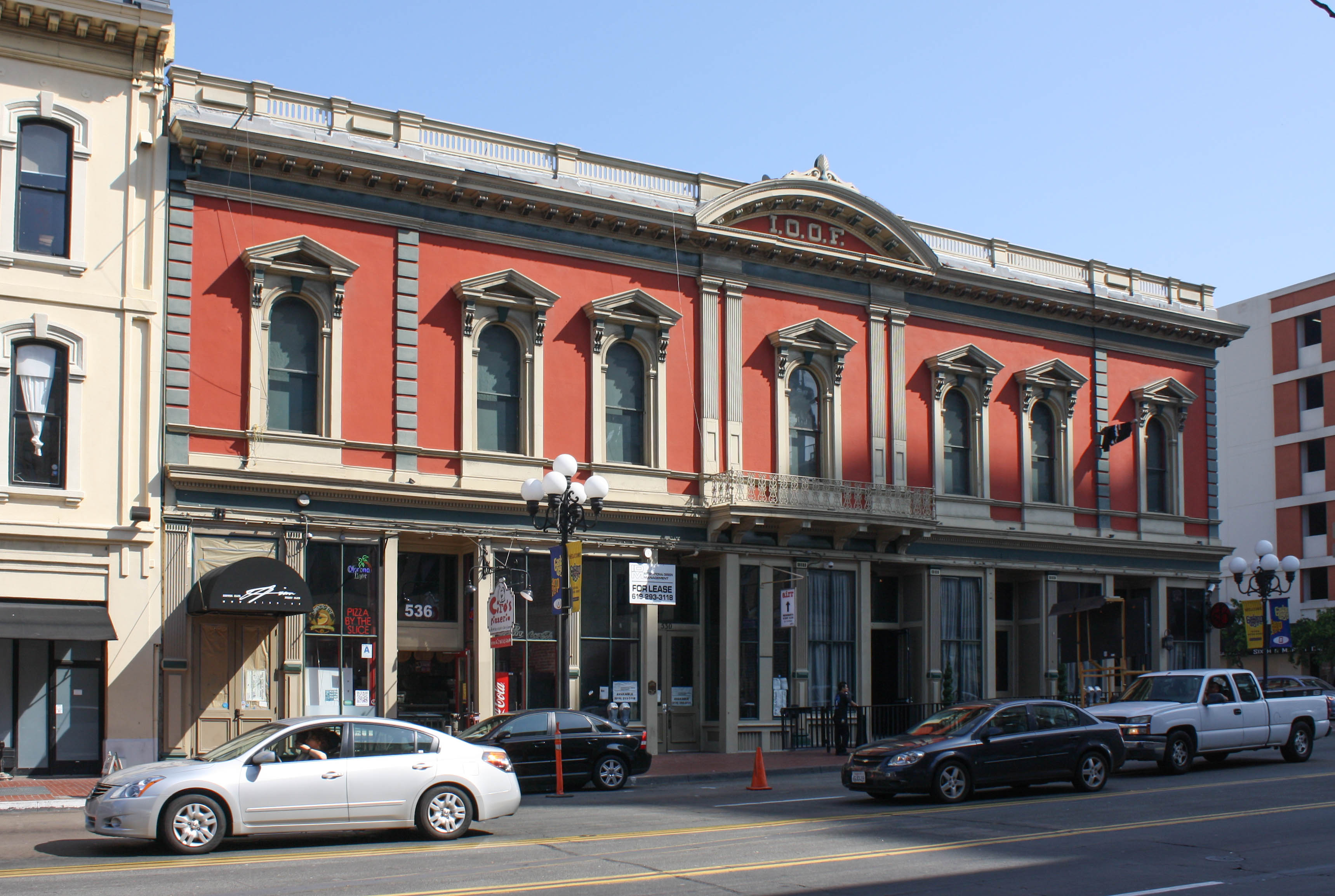
- Independent Order of Odd Fellows Building, 2008

- Location within San Diego Location within San Diego County, California Location within California Location within the United States
- Location: San Diego, California
- Coordinates: 32°42′42″N 117°9′31″W
- Built: 1882
- Architect: Levi Goodrich
- Architectural style: Late 19th And 20th Century Revivals
- NRHP reference No.: 78000751
- SDHL No.: 70

Significant dates
- Added to NRHP: January 31, 1978
- Designated SDHL: June 2, 1972

Independent Order of Odd Fellows Building is a historic building in San Diego, California. Built in 1882, the Odd Fellows Building was added to the National Register of Historic Places in 1978. It is located at 526 Market Street, within the historic Gaslamp Quarter.
