= William J. Knox =

American businessman and politician (1820–1867)

William J. Knox (1820–1867) was a medical doctor, businessman, and politician in 19th-century California. Knox migrated to California with his wife Sarah Knox-Goodrich in 1850, and co-founded the South Yuba Canal Water Company in Nevada County. He served in the California Assembly for Nevada County and the California State Senate for Santa Clara County where he authored a bill giving married women the right to control their own estate.

== Early life ==
William James Knox was born October 20, 1820, near Hopkinsville, Christian County, Kentucky, and moved at an early age to Lincoln County, Missouri. He attended the Louisville Medical Institute in Louisville, Kentucky, and earned his medical degree in 1847, and practiced in Troy, Missouri until 1850. Knox married Sarah Browning on April 1, 1846.

== Business and politics ==
In 1850, William and Sarah left Missouri, together with Sarah's sister, and traveled by wagon train to Nevada City, California. Knox and four partners built the South Yuba Canal and made a fortune selling water to gold miners during the California gold rush. In 1854, Knox was elected to the California Assembly, representing Nevada County.

In 1862, the Knoxes moved to San Francisco and then to San Jose in 1864. Knox purchased a 50-para lot on the northwest corner of First and Santa Clara streets in 1865 and built several buildings known collectively as Knox Block. Knox and his brother-in-law, T. Ellard Beans, opened Santa Clara County's first bank in 1866. It was called Knox & Beans, Bankers, and was located in Knox Block. Knox served as the bank's first president. After Knox's death, it was merged into the Bank of San José.

In 1865, Knox was elected to the California State Senate for Santa Clara county. He served only one year before his death but authored two important bills. First, he introduced Senate Bill No. 252 that gave married women the right to control their own estate. The bill read: "Any married woman may dispose of all her estate by will, absolutely, without the consent of her husband, either express or implied, and may alter or revoke the same in like manner". The bill was passed. Second, he authored a bill for taxation of all property not owned by the state or county. Despite opposition from groups such as churches, the bill passed (posthumously).

Knox died at Lick House in San Francisco on November 13, 1867. William and Sarah had one child, Virginia, who married Cabel H. Maddox of San Francisco. Maddox was elected to the California State Senate in 1882.

== Sources ==
- Munro-Fraser, J. P. (1881), History of Santa Clara County, California: Including Its Geography, Geology, Topography, Climatography and Description ..., San Francisco, California: Alley, Bowen, & Company, pp. 765–767
