= Japantown/Ayer station =

VTA light rail station in San Jose, California

Japantown/Ayer
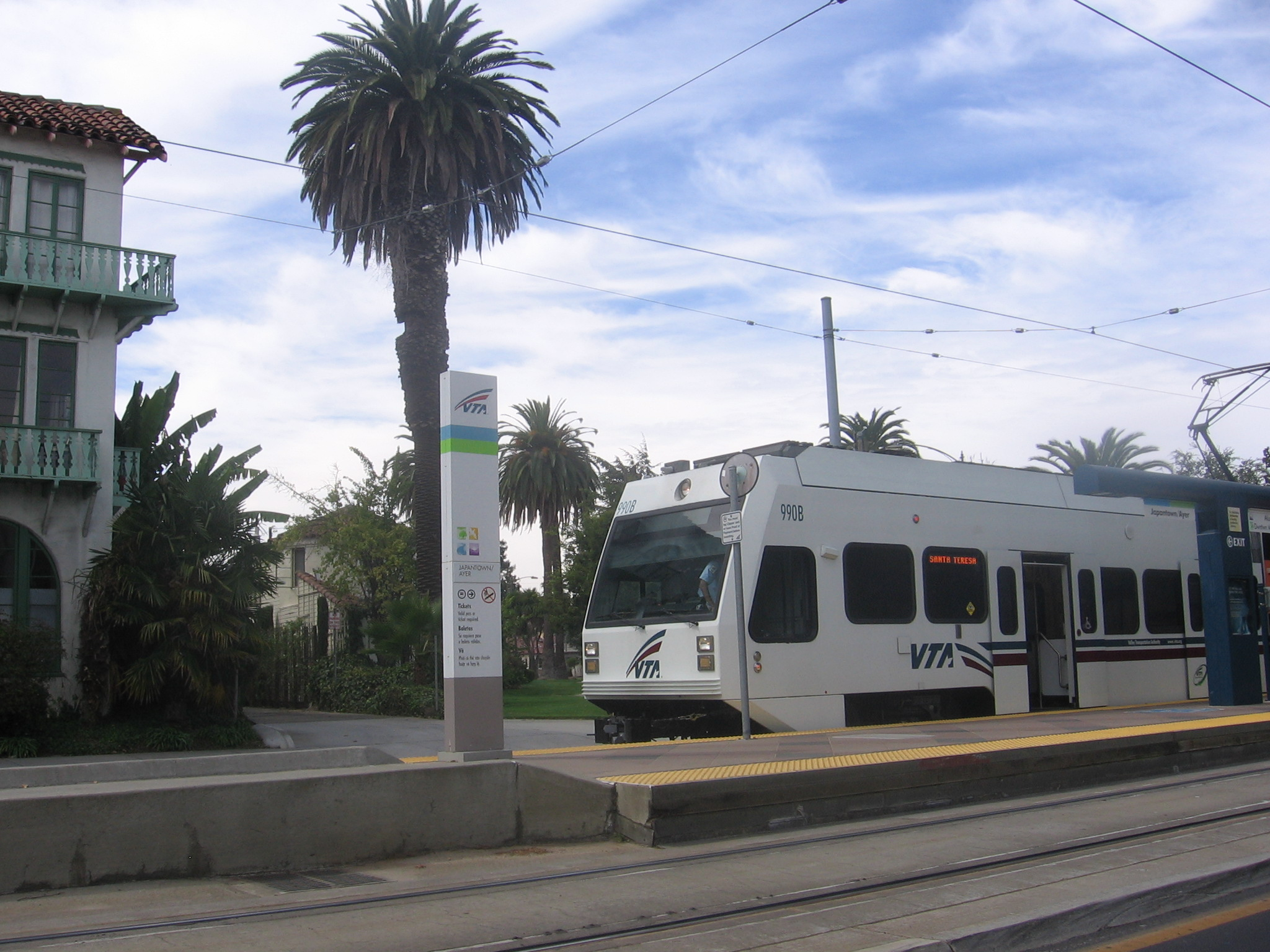
- A VTA train at Japantown/Ayer station

General information
- Location: 1st Street and Ayer Avenue; San Jose, California
- Coordinates: 37°20′42″N 121°53′50″W
- Owner: Santa Clara Valley Transportation Authority
- Line: Guadalupe Phase 2
- Platforms: 1 island platform
- Tracks: 2

Construction
- Accessible: Yes

History
- Opened: June 17, 1988

Services
Preceding station	VTA	Following station
Civic Center toward Baypointe	Blue Line	Saint James toward Santa Teresa
Civic Center toward Old Ironsides	Green Line	Saint James toward Winchester
Civic Center Terminus	Holly Trolley Christmastime only	Saint James toward San Jose Diridon
Location

Japantown/Ayer station is a light rail station operated by Santa Clara Valley Transportation Authority. It is located on the western side of the Japantown district of San Jose, California at the intersection of 1st Street and Ayer Avenue, just north of Empire Street. This station is served by the Blue and Green lines of the VTA light rail system.
