= St. James Park (San Jose, California) =

Park in San Jose, California

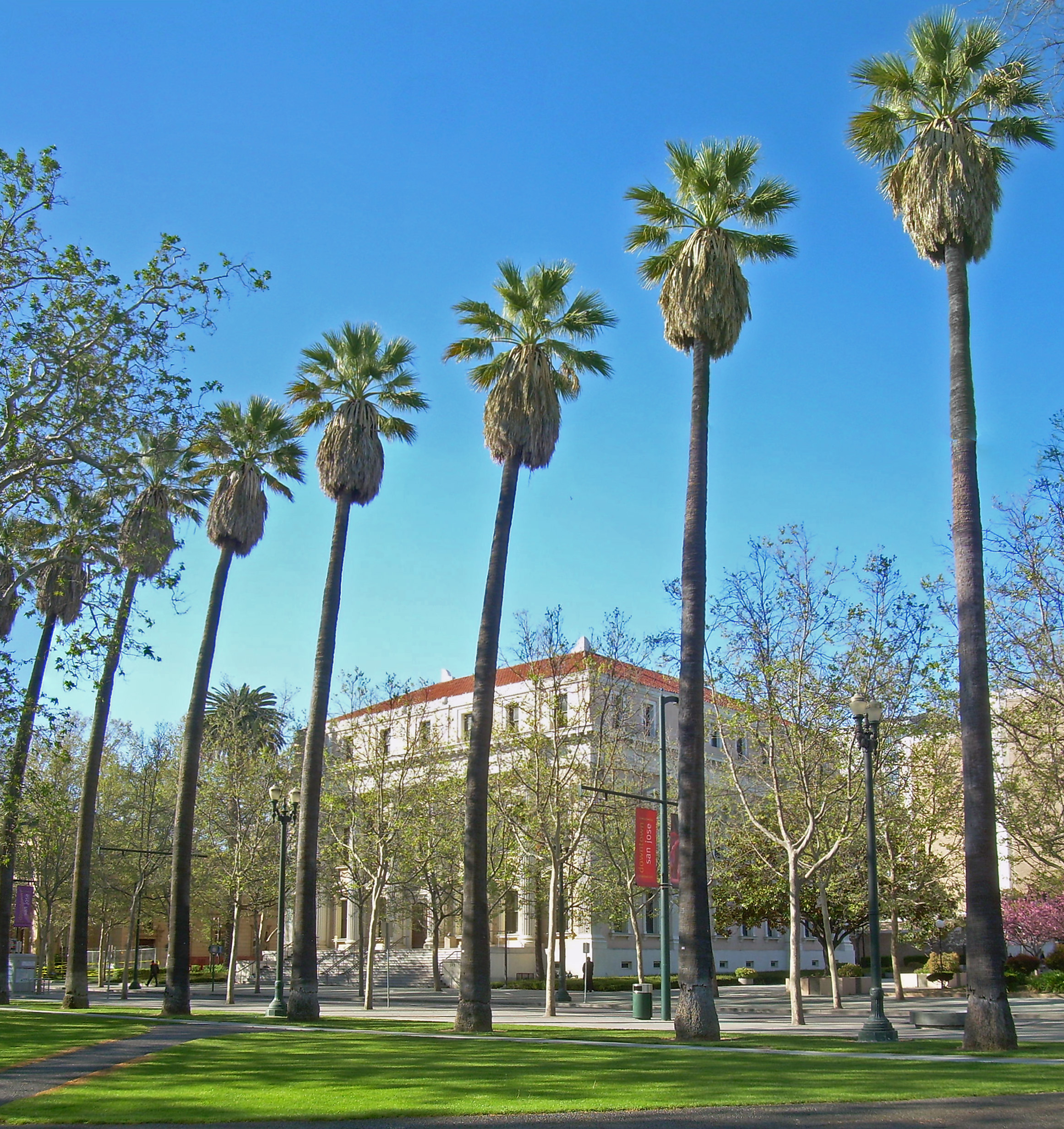
- View west towards the old Santa Clara County Courthouse along N 1st St from St. James Park.

- Location within San Jose, California
- Coordinates: 37.338949°N 121.891203°W
- Area: 6.8 acres (2.8 ha)
- Created: 1800s
- Operator: Department of Parks, Recreation & Neighborhood Services, City of San Jose
- Open: daily, sunrise – sunset
- Public transit: Saint James
- Website: www.sanjoseca.gov/Home/Components/FacilityDirectory/FacilityDirectory/2661/2028
- St. James Square
- U.S. National Register of Historic Places
- U.S. Historic district
- Built: 1863–1933
- NRHP reference No.: 79000546
- Added to NRHP: November 27, 1979

St. James Park is a 6.8-acre (2.8 ha) park in downtown San Jose, California. Originally laid out as St. James Square in 1848, local newspapers dubbed the site a park in 1885, shortly after a fountain was installed in the center of the area. In 1933, two men who were accused of kidnapping and murdering Brooke Hart were lynched in St. James Park. Since then, a road and light rail tracks have been added, bisecting the park; it is now a popular gathering spot for the homeless population of San Jose.

== History ==
St. James Square was mapped in 1848 as part of the official survey of the city by Chester Lyman, but not further developed until after Trinity Episcopal Church was erected next to the square in 1863; the Square was developed in the late 1860s, starting with a fence erected in 1866. William O'Donnell landscaped the park under contract to the city of San Jose. It was one of three public squares in San Jose at the time, alongside Washington Square (site of present-day San Jose State) and Market Plaza (now Plaza de César Chávez); O'Donnell was responsible for all three. Under O'Donnell's plan, the landscaping effort was in planting hundreds of trees to provide shade, a rarity in downtown San Jose at the time. At the time, no paths were known to exist, based on the earliest photograph of the park, dating to 1870. Although oral histories indicate that Frederick Law Olmsted was involved in the initial design of the park, his formal participation has not been confirmed. A hole 500 feet (150 m) deep was dug to provide a city well, but without success, and the effort was abandoned in 1879.

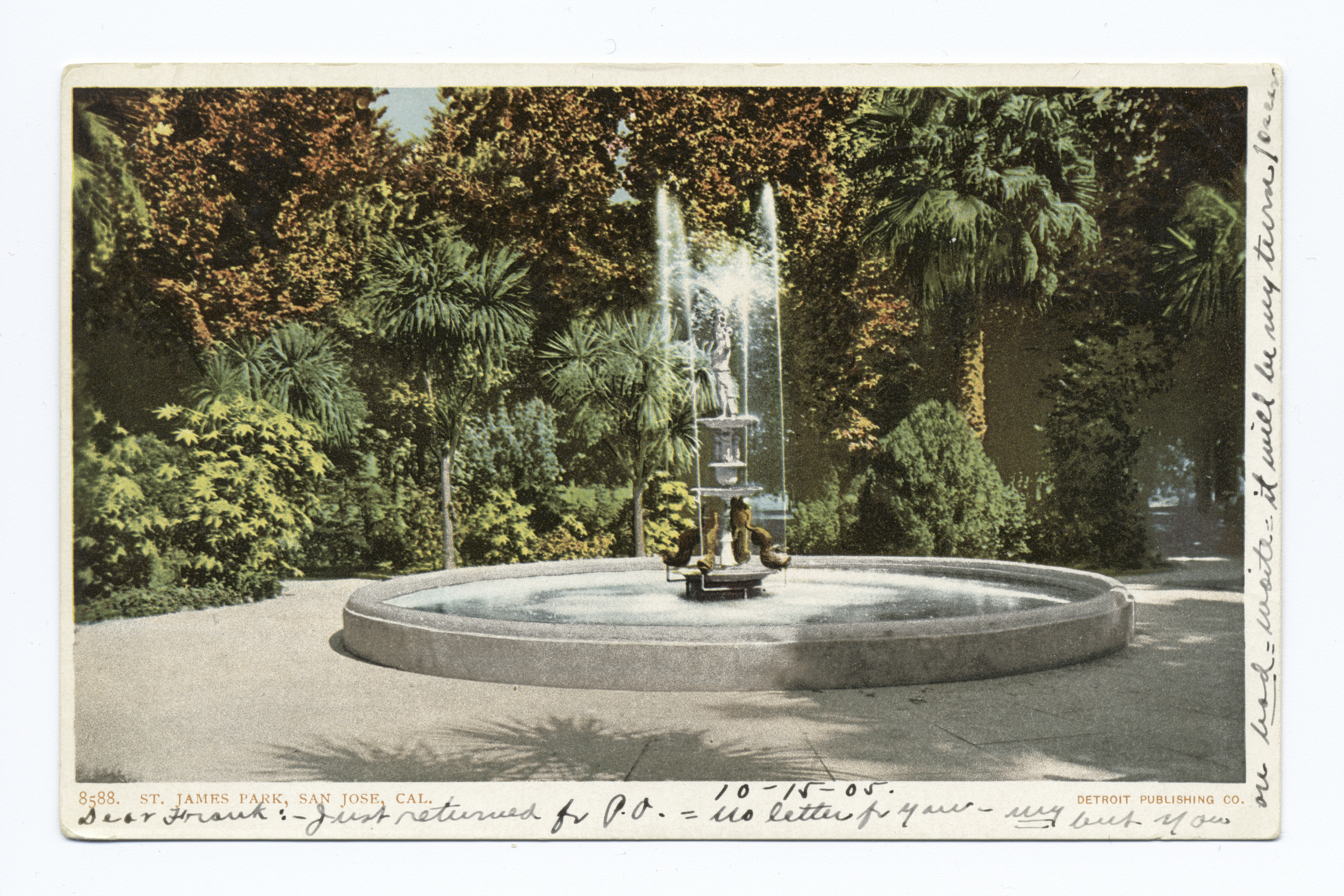
1885 fountain

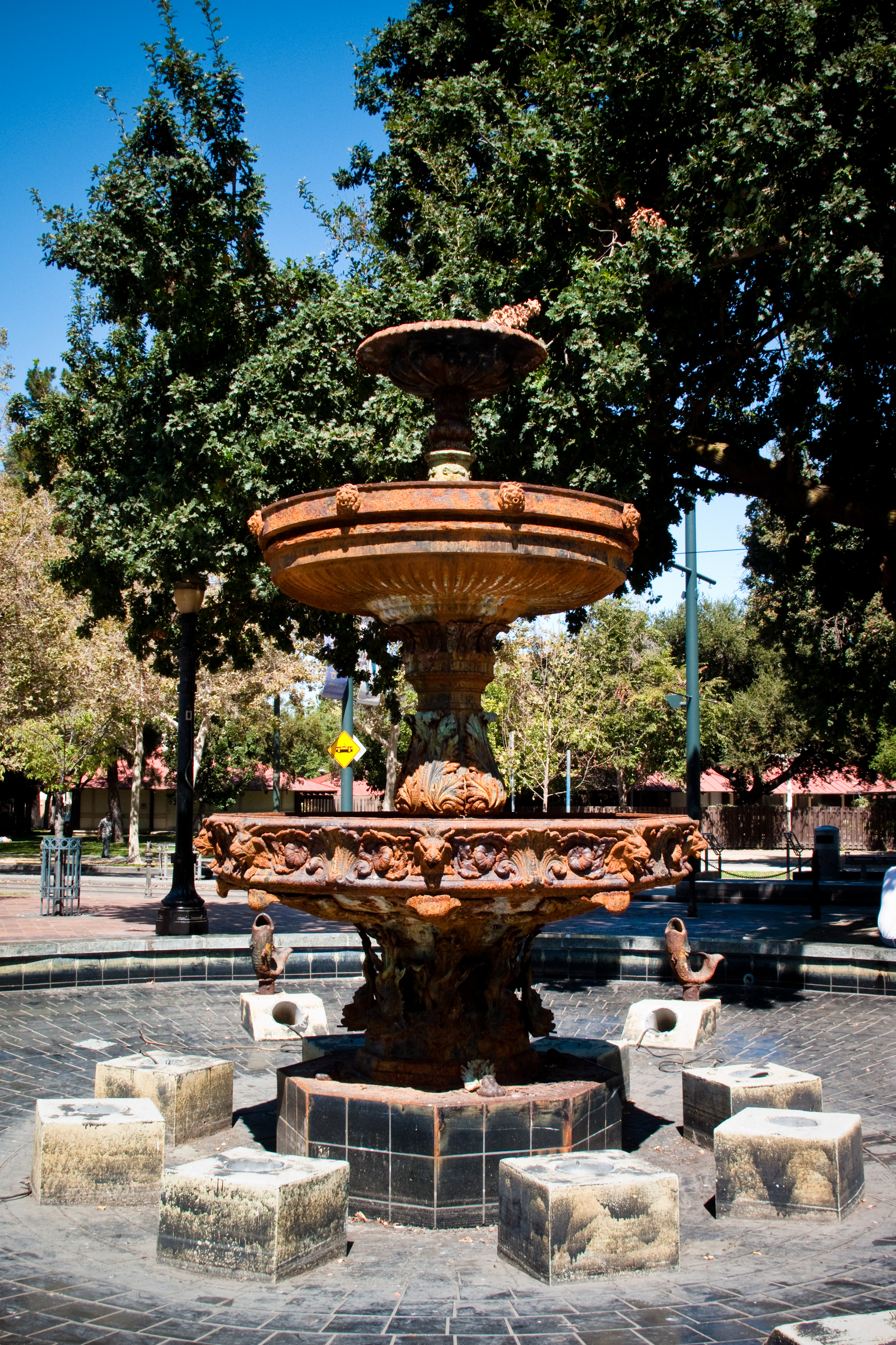
1990 fountain

One of the first major features was a fountain at the park's center; it was built in 1885 and the area began to be called St. James Park instead of St. James Square at about this time. According to contemporary photographs, the fountain contained a standing female figure, with water spilling from an urn held over the statue's head. The fence was removed in 1886. In 1887, Rudolph Ulrich was given a contract to re-landscape all three public squares. Simultaneously, local merchants advocated for an extension of North Second Street through the park. Ulrich is credited with adding rows of palm trees along North First and Third streets to provide a more formal border between the park and encroaching downtown businesses. By 1891, formal diagonal and curvilinear paths had been laid through the park, according to contemporary photographs and that year's Sanborn Fire Insurance Map.

President William McKinley visited San Jose on May 13, 1901, en route to San Francisco; plans for his welcome included a giant bouquet of cut flowers 30 feet (9.1 m) tall and 90 feet (27 m) in circumference at the western entrance to St. James Park, billed as the largest bouquet ever made. After his assassination in September 1901, citizens of San Jose held a memorial service at St. James Park and began planning a permanent monument.

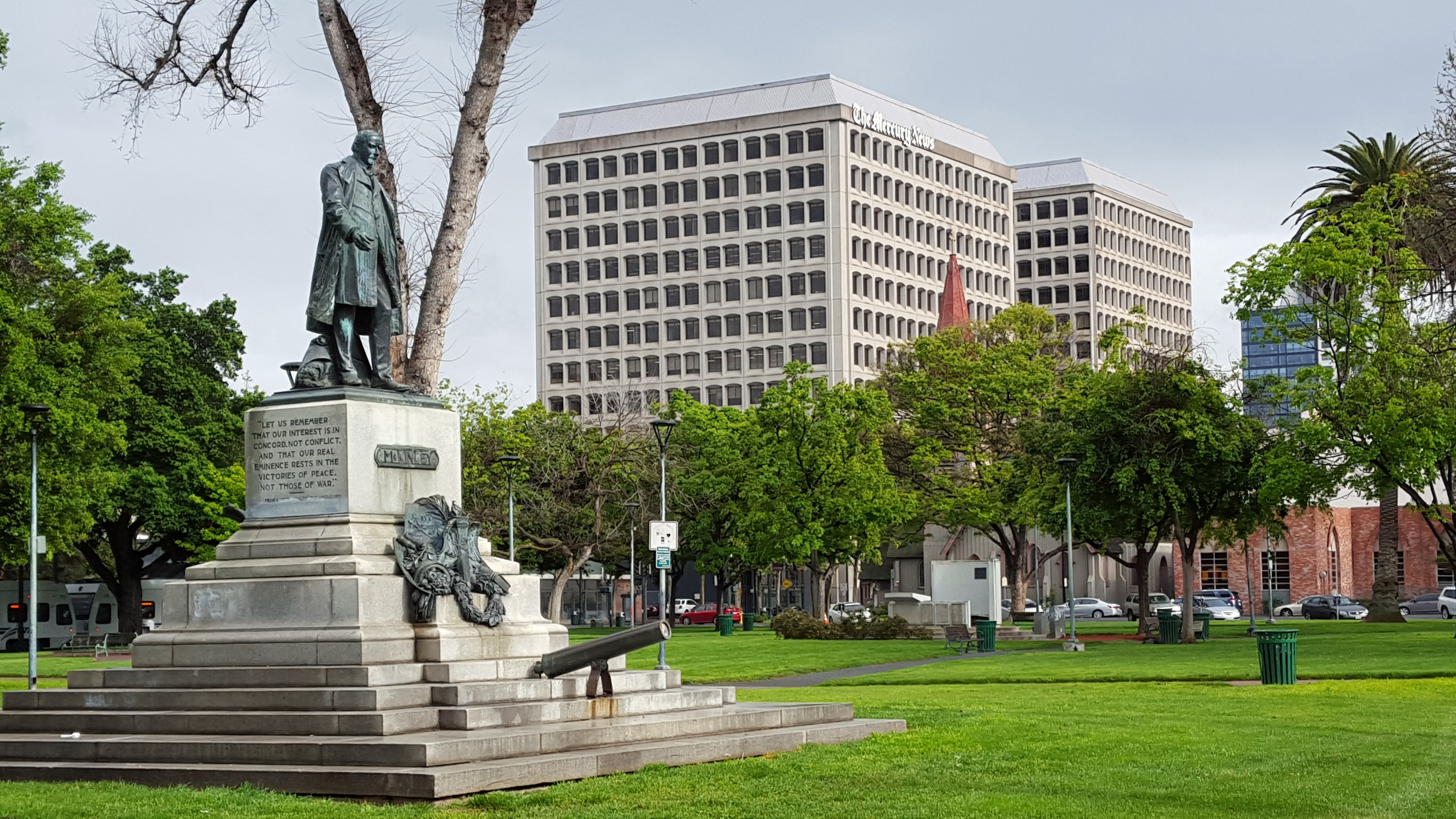
The McKinley Memorial dates back to 1903.

The William McKinley statue was placed on its base in December 1902. On February 21, 1903, the statue was unveiled on the site where the president had spoken to the public during his visit to the city in May 1901. The standing bronze sculpture, mounted on a granite pedestal, was executed by Rupert Schmid at a cost of US$13,500 (equivalent to $484,000 in 2025), paid through private donations. A brass cannon is at the foot of the McKinley monument; it has been the site of vigilante justice, including a 1918 incident in which George Koetzer, a brewery employee, was accused of making pro-German remarks by the Knights of Liberty, for which he was tarred and feathered, then chained to the cannon.

The city made its first drawing of the park in 1920, showing an overhead view of the park's layout. Diagonal paths connect the corners of the park with the central fountain plaza; additional paths cutting east–west and north–south through the center of the park are also present, along with a meandering path connecting all four corners slightly in from the park's perimeter.

The 1885 fountain was demolished in a remodel that occurred under a Works Progress Administration (WPA) project to renovate the park in the 1930s. Various WPA projects brought a new post office to the park's western edge and restrooms at the northern and southern ends of the park; the restrooms were removed in the 1950s. During the construction of the post office, Harold Thurmond and John Holmes were lynched in St. James Park for the kidnapping and murder of Brooke Hart in November 1933. Construction materials from the post office were used to storm the city jail where the men were being held; the trees in the park from which the men were hanged (not far from the McKinley memorial) were removed shortly afterward to deter souvenir-seekers.

Other memorials within St. James Park honor Henry Morris Naglee (erected 1915 by his daughters) and Robert F. Kennedy (1970). Kennedy had spoken at St. James Park on March 23, 1968, while running for president; he was assassinated later that year. In 1994, the Memorial Bell for San Jose firefighters was moved to the park from Plaza de César Chávez; it was subsequently relocated to Old Fire Station 1 in 2001.

Voters narrowly passed an initiative to extend North Second Street through the center of the park in 1952 to accommodate increased traffic, and the extension was completed in 1955, bisecting it; a later proposal to remove North Second in 1976 failed. A senior center was constructed in 1973 in the northeast quadrant of the park, using modular structures that were intended to be temporary.

The St. James Square Historic District was added to the National Register of Historic Places on November 27, 1979. It encompasses the original St. James Square (now St. James Park) along with several bordering properties.

A replacement fountain was constructed between 1988 and 1990 in the western half of the park, but is presently not functioning. The 1990 fountain is meant to evoke the 1885 fountain but not replicate it.

Contributing properties to the St. James Square Historic District
1 161 N 1st: Old Courthouse (1866, Levi Goodrich)
2 105 N 1st: Post Office (1933, Ralph Wyckoff)
3 81 N 2nd: Trinity Episcopal Church (1863, John W. Hammond)
4 152 N 3rd: Eagles Club (c.1900)
5 160 N 3rd: First Unitarian Church (1891, G.W. Page)
6 Scottish Rite Temple (1924, Carl Werner)
7 65 E St James: Sainte Claire Club (1893, A. Page Brown)
8 61 E St James: First Church of Christ Scientist (1904, Willis Polk)
9 200 N 1st: Letcher Garage (c.1906)

== Location ==
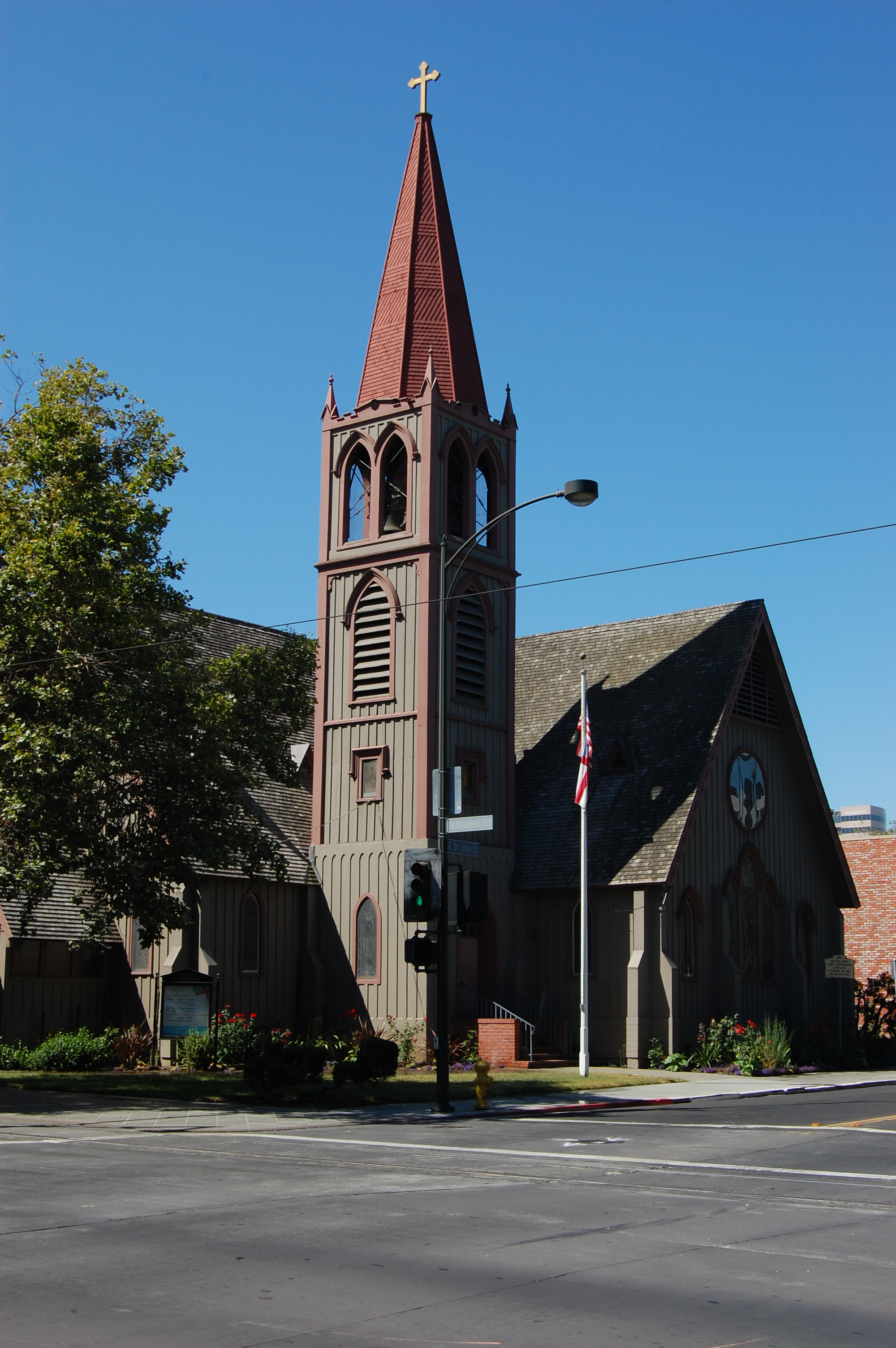
Trinity Episcopal Cathedral, 81 N 2nd

St. James Park is bounded by East St. James Street (on the north), North Third St (on the east), East St. John St (on the south), and North First St (on the west); it is divided into western and eastern halves by North Second Street. As originally laid out, it measured 1,005 feet (306 m) (east-west between North First and North Third) and 610 feet (190 m) (north-south from East St James to East St John).

It is served by the Saint James Santa Clara Valley Transportation Authority light rail stop; northbound trains stop along the western edge, along North First, and southbound trains stop in the center of the park, along North Second. The light rail lines were completed in 1988.

=== St. James Square Historic District ===
The St. James Square Historic District established in 1979 consisted of St. James Park along with nine contributing properties surrounding it.

One of the properties listed as contributing to the Historic District, the Clarence Letcher Garage or Four-Wheel Brake Building at the corner of N 1st and St James, most recently housed the Oasis nightclub until it was shut down in 1996 following the beating death of Jason Cooper; the building was demolished in 2010. Clarence Letcher was a prominent San Jose automobile dealer who was shot and killed by his wife in a murder-suicide that occurred at the Garage on July 3, 1926.

St. James Square Historic District
No.	Name	Image	Address	Year	Architect
1	Old Courthouse		161 N 1st	1866	Levi Goodrich
2	Post Office		105 N 1st	1933	Ralph Wyckoff
3	Trinity Episcopal Cathedral		81 N 2nd	1863	John W. Hammond
4	Eagles Club		152 N 3rd	1900	—
5	First Unitarian Church		160 N 3rd	1891	G.W. Page
6	Scottish Rite Temple		196 N 3rd	1924	Carl Werner
7	Sainte Claire Club		65 E St James	1893	A. Page Brown
8	First Church of Christ Scientist		61 E St James	1904	Willis Polk
9	Letcher Garage		200 N 1st	1906	—
