= Levi Goodrich =

American architect (1822–1887)

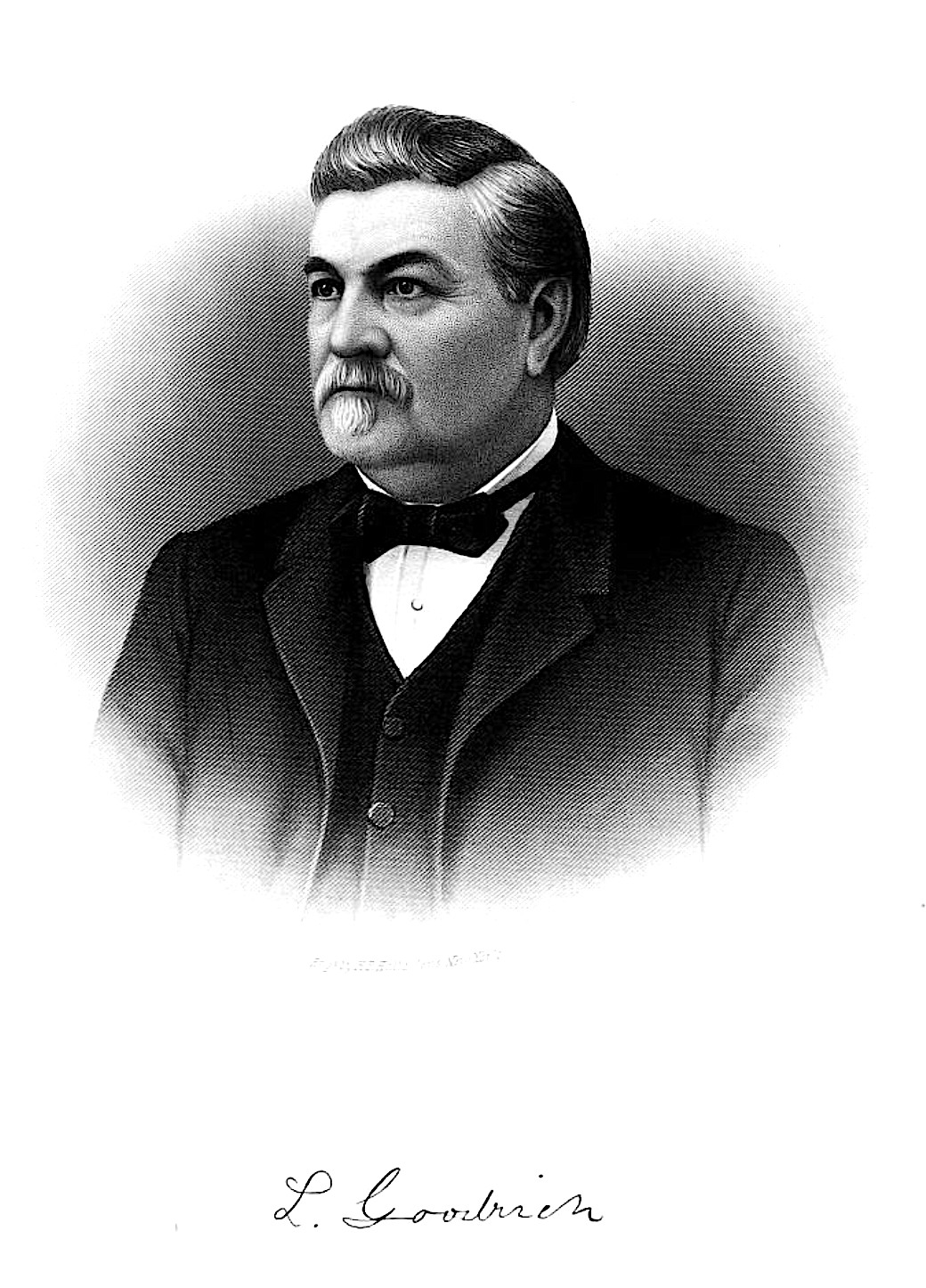
Levi Goodrich

Levi Goodrich (1822–1887) was an American architect based in San Jose, California. His most notable projects include San Jose City Hall, Santa Clara County Courthouse, San Jose City Hall, and California State Normal School. Goodrich's wife, Sarah Knox-Goodrich, was a well known activist who worked for women's suffrage in California.

== Biography ==
Levi Goodrich was born January 1, 1822, in New York City. His parents died when he was young, and he lived with relatives in Stockbridge, Massachusetts. Goodrich became a carpenter, then studied architecture in the office of R. G Hatfield in New York City.

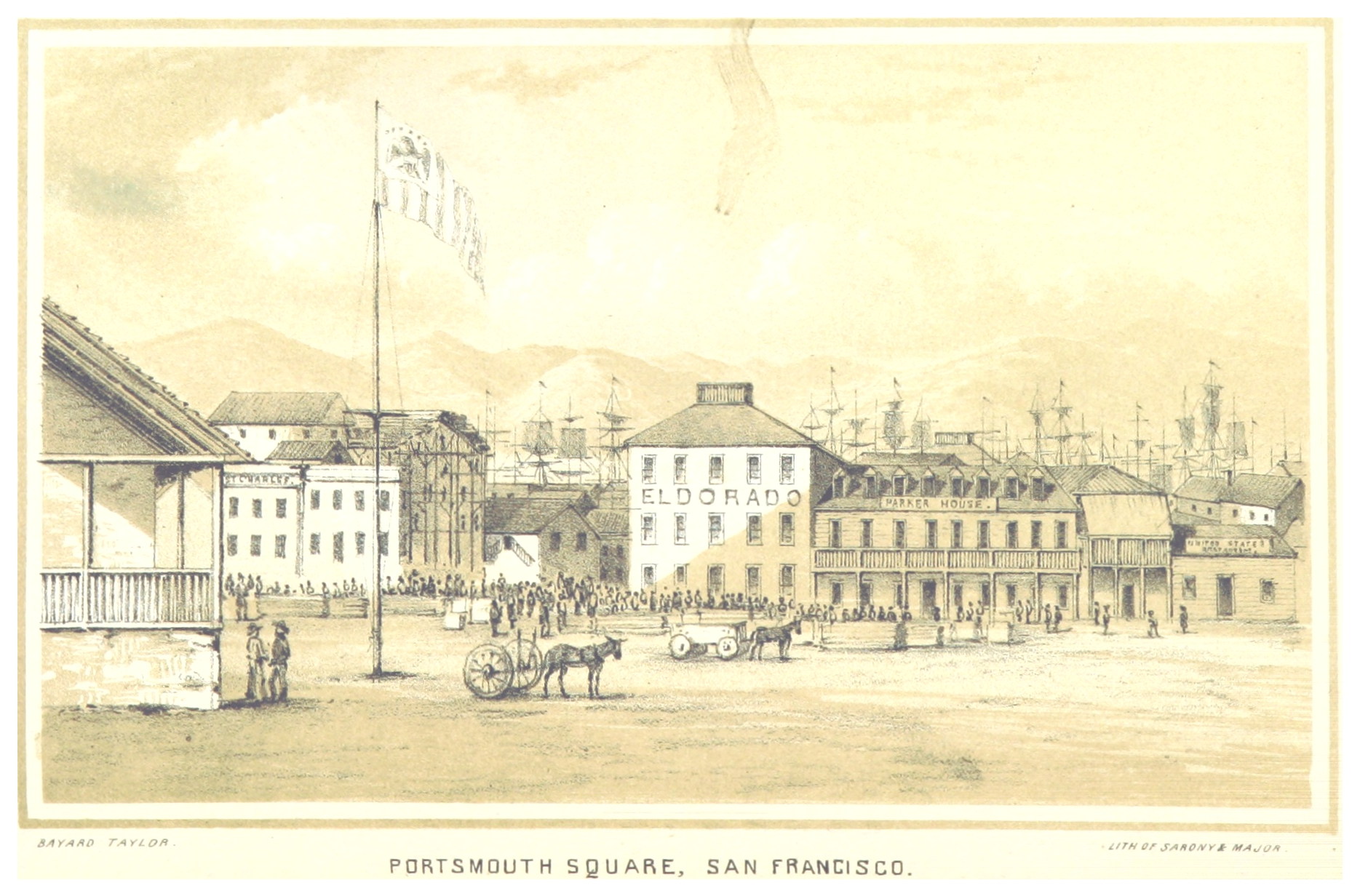
Portsmouth Square, San Francisco, with the Parker Hotel in the background

On March 8, 1849, Goodrich sailed for California via Cape Horn on the ship Loochoo arriving on September 16, 1849. He traveled with a large quantity of building materials and sold them upon arriving in San Francisco. Soon after arriving, he designed the Parker house, a wood-framed building on Portsmouth Square. The building, at the corner of Washington and Kearny Streets, was built to replace tents used by gold rush miners. It was reportedly the first work in San Francisco by a professional architect.

Goodrich moved to San Jose, California, in November 1849. His architectural offices were in the Knox Block.

On April 13, 1854, Goodrich married Juliet Peck. They had a son, E. B. Goodrich, who joined his father's office and, eventually, succeeded him.

Goodrich married Sarah Knox on January 15, 1879. She was prominent in the cause of equal rights for women, fully supported by her husband.

Goodrich retired in 1886. On April 2, 1887, he suffered an attack of apoplexy while visiting San Diego with his wife, and quickly died. He is buried in Oak Hill Cemetery in San Jose.

== Buildings ==
=== San Jose ===
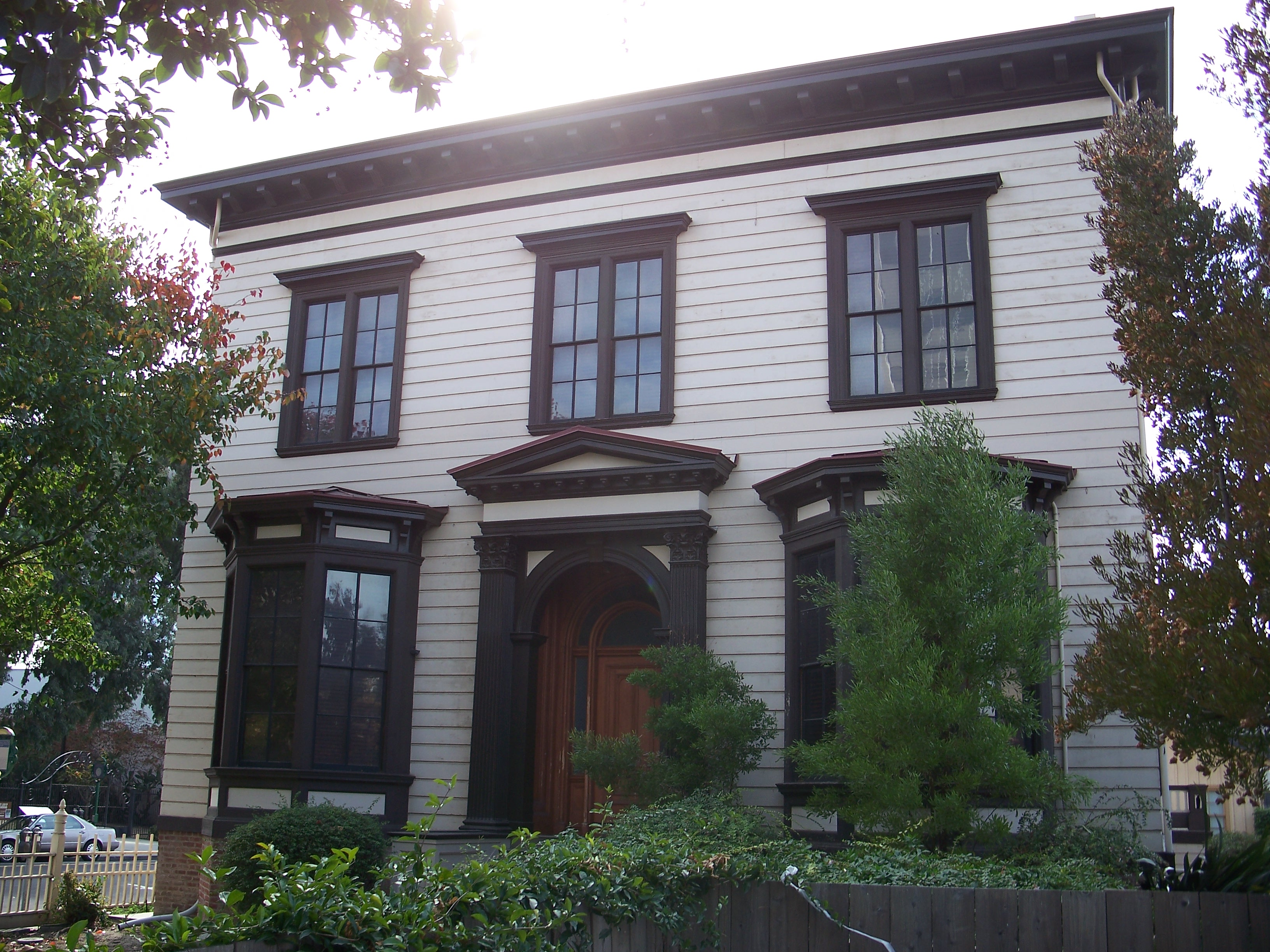
Thomas Fallon House, San Jose

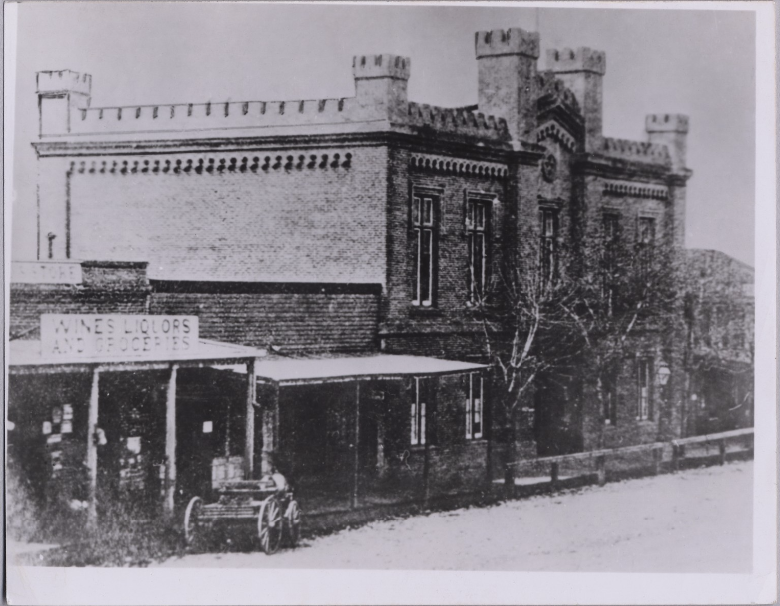
San Jose City Hall, San Jose

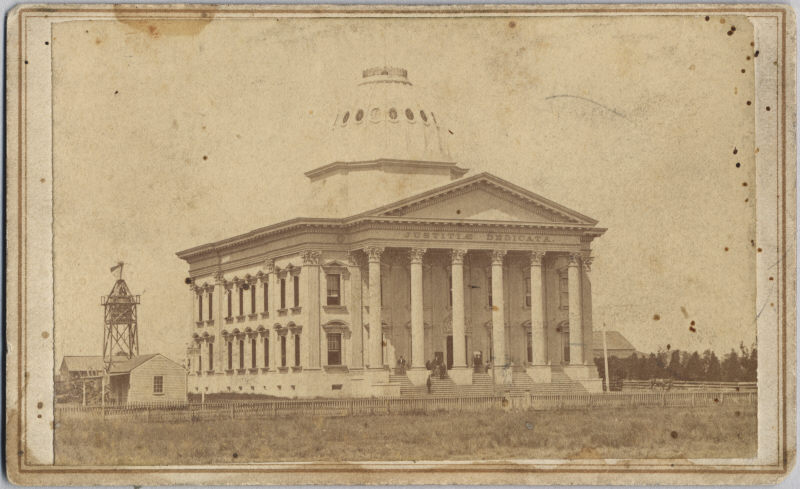
Santa Clara County Courthouse, San Jose

California State Normal School, San Jose

- 1851, an adobe house at Santa Clara and Lightstone Streets, with J. D. Hoppe
- 1851, two one-story adobe buildings on Santa Clara Street, for Frank Lightson
- 1853, part of the Women's College of Notre Dame and convent
- c. 1854, Thomas Fallon House, 175 West St. John Street, a two-story Italianate villa, now a museum
- 1855, San Jose City Hall, 35 North Market Street, designed to resemble a medieval castle with parapets and towers; destroyed in the 1906 San Francisco earthquake
- 1863, First Presbyterian Church of San Jose; destroyed in the 1906 San Francisco earthquake
- 1866–1868, Santa Clara County Courthouse, 161 North 1st Street, a two-story Neoclassical building with a dome, overlooking St. James Square; destroyed by fire in 1931
- 1869–1871, county jailhouse
- 1880, California State Normal School
- University of the Pacific
- Also, Knox Block (Goodrich's office was in room 20 of this building), three public school buildings, Bank of San Jose, and Martin Block

=== San Diego ===
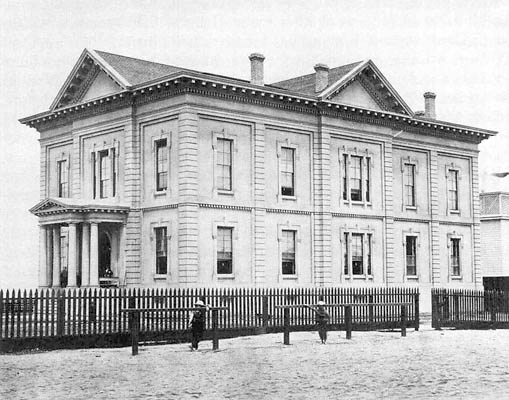
San Diego County Courthouse

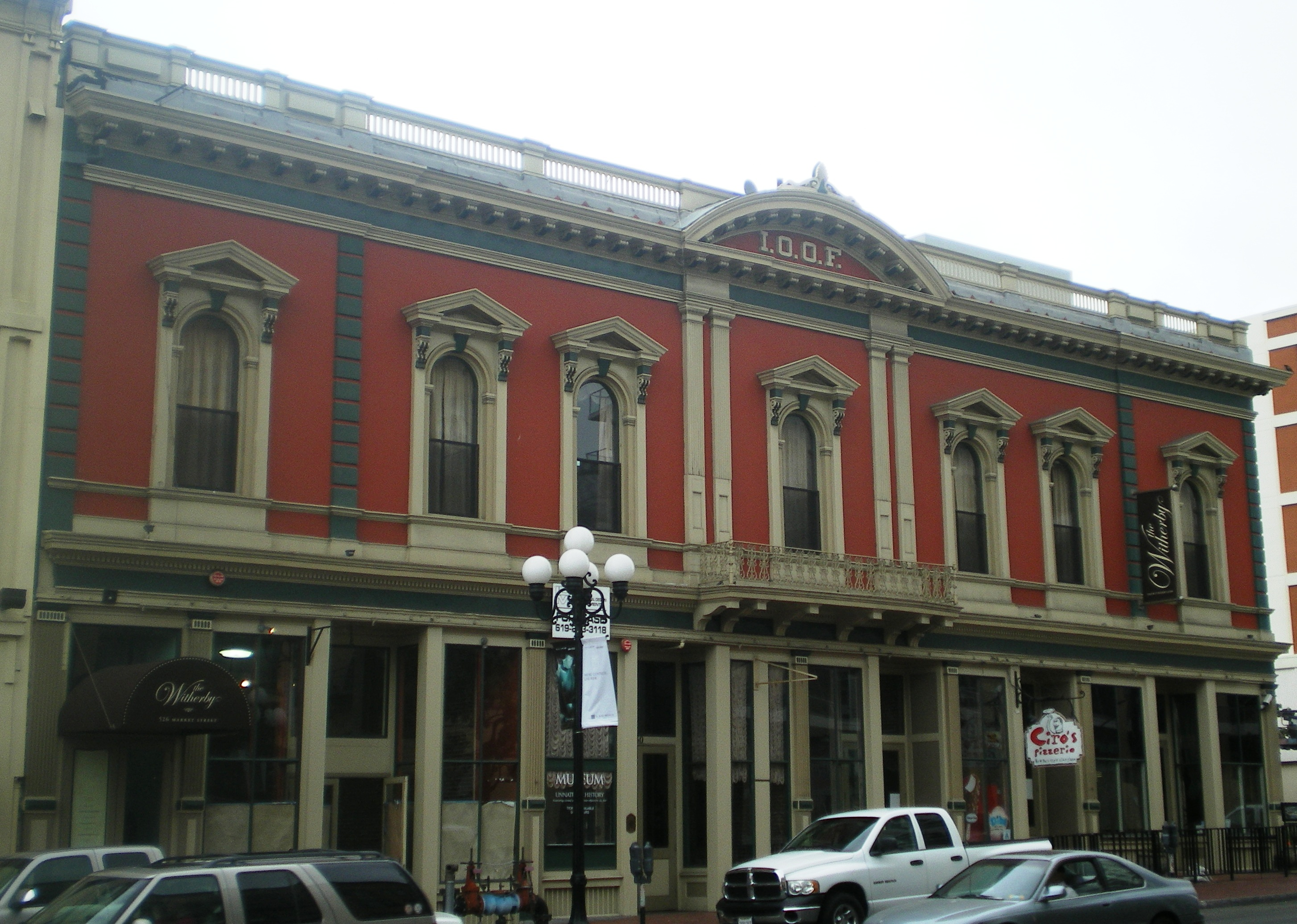
Independent Order of Odd Fellows Building, San Diego

- 1872, San Diego County Courthouse, a Classical-style building on land donated by Alonzo E. Horton
- 1882, Independent Order of Odd Fellows building, at 526 Market Street, listed on the National Register of Historic Places

=== Other places ===
- Monterey County Courthouse
- 1949, Parker House Hotel, San Francisco, CA

== Goodrich Quarry ==
In 1874, Goodrich purchased a 500-acre sandstone quarry that came to be known as Goodrich's Free-Stone Quarry. The quarry is about eight miles south of San Jose in the Santa Teresa Hills on the eastern slope of the Almaden Valley. After Goodrich's death, the quarry was leased, and then sold, to the quarry's stone master Jacob Pfeiffer. It was renamed Graystone Quarry.

The stone from the Goodrich/Graystone quarry has been used in many California buildings including the front walls and cornices of the Stanford University quadrangle the Santa Clara County Courthouse, U.S. Post Office in San Jose (now the San Jose Museum of Art), California State Normal School, Lick Observatory, University of the Pacific, the Knox-Goodrich Building, San Carlos Railroad Depot, and Agnews State Hospital.

== Sources ==
- Cerny, Susan Dinkelspiel (2007). An Architectural Guidebook to San Francisco and the Bay Area. Gibbs Smith. ISBN 978-1-58685-432-4.
- Foote, Horace S. (1888). Pen Pictures from the Garden of the World, Or, Santa Clara County California. Lewis Publishing Company.
- Hall, Frederic (1871). The history of San José and surroundings : with biographical sketches of early settlers. San Francisco : A.L. Bancroft and Co.
- Kirker, Harold (1960). California's Architectural Frontier. Russell & Russell. OCLC 750011.
- Langley, Henry G. (1867). The Pacific Coast Business Directory for the State of California. H. G. Langley. p. 239.
- Munro-Fraser, J. P. (1881). History of Santa Clara County, California: Including Its Geography, Geology, Topography, Climatography and Description ... Alley, Bowen, & Company.
