= Civic Center station (VTA) =

VTA light rail station in San Jose, California

Civic Center
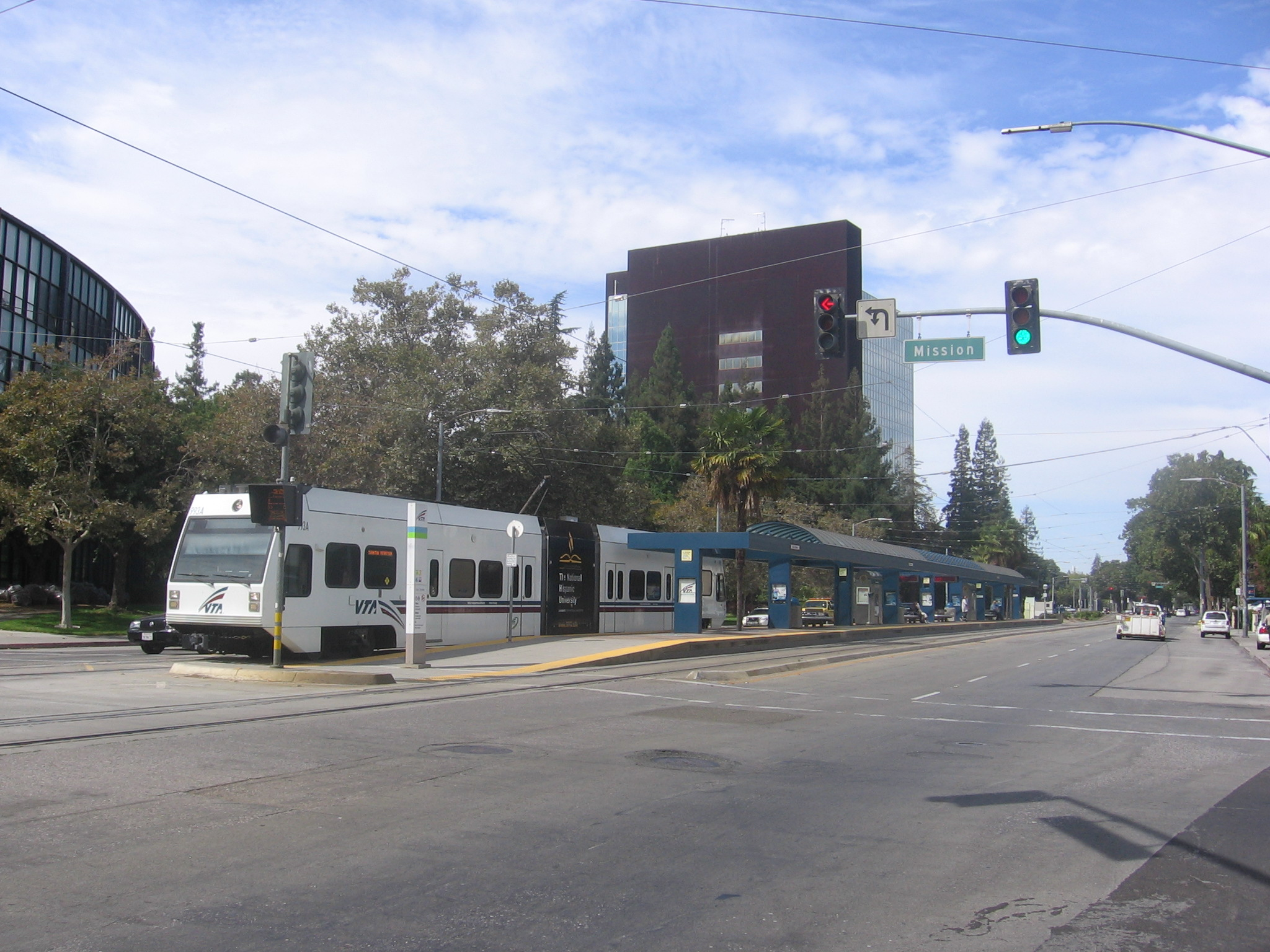
- A VTA Light Rail train at Civic Center station

General information
- Location: 1st Street and Mission Street; San Jose, California
- Coordinates: 37°21′04″N 121°54′06″W
- Owner: Santa Clara Valley Transportation Authority
- Line: Guadalupe Phase 2
- Platforms: 1 island platform
- Tracks: 2
- Connections: VTA Bus: 61

Construction
- Accessible: Yes

History
- Opened: June 17, 1988

Services
Preceding station	VTA	Following station
Gish toward Baypointe	Blue Line	Japantown/Ayer toward Santa Teresa
Gish toward Old Ironsides	Green Line	Japantown/Ayer toward Winchester
Terminus	Holly Trolley Christmastime only	Japantown/Ayer toward San Jose Diridon
Location

Civic Center station is a light rail station operated by Santa Clara Valley Transportation Authority. The station is located in San Jose, California, on 1st Street just north of Mission Street. The station is located in and named after the Civic Center area where many city and county government buildings are located, including the County Administration Campus, San Jose Police Department, Santa Clara County Sheriff's Office, and Santa Clara County Superior Court. The station is served by the Blue and Green lines of the VTA light rail system.
