= Santa Clara County Superior Court =

Law court in California, United States

Superior Court of California, County of Santa Clara
- Seal of the Court

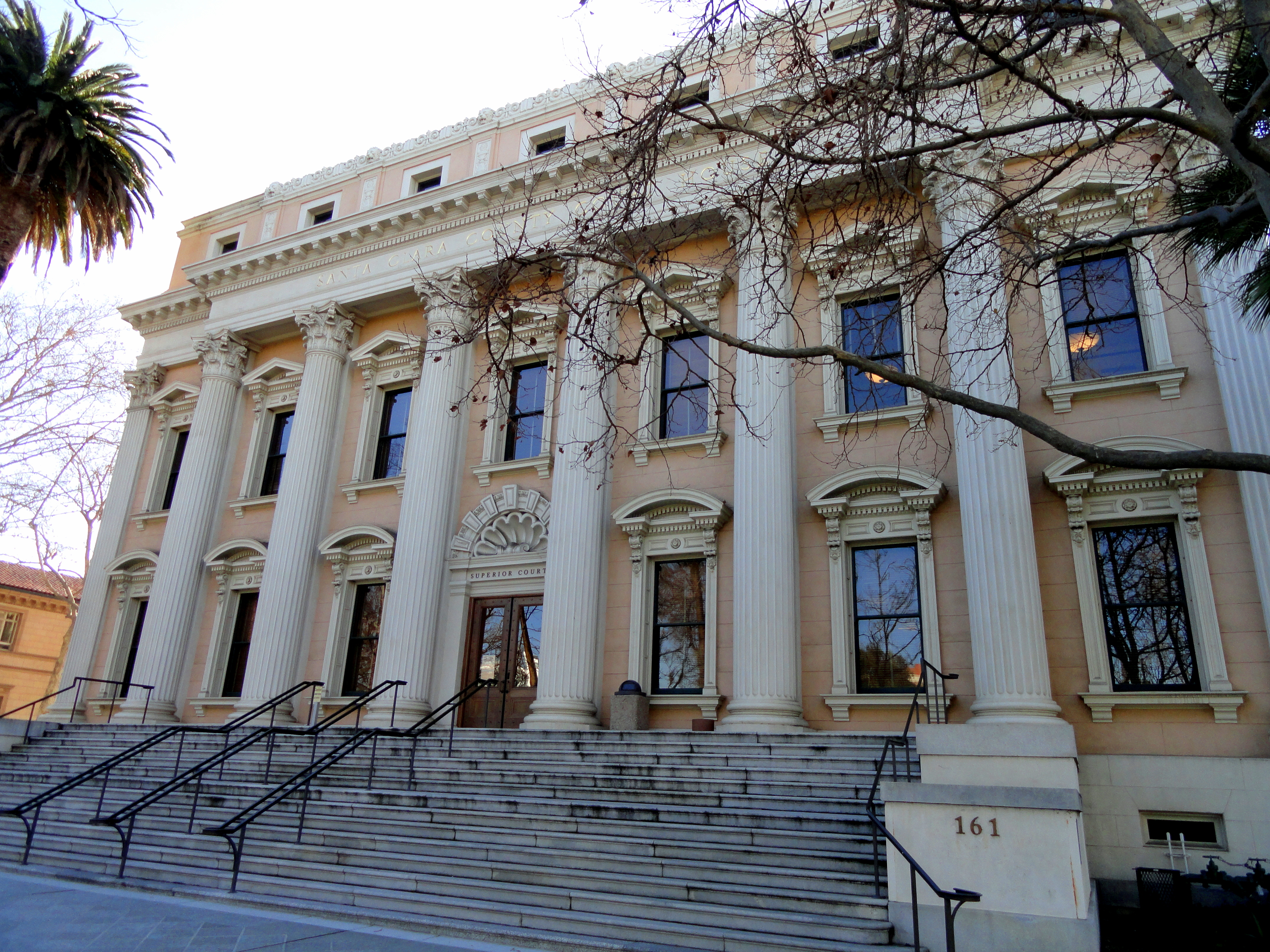
- Interactive map of Superior Court of California, County of Santa Clara
- Jurisdiction: California; Santa Clara County
- Composition method: Non-partisan election
- Authorised by: Constitution of California
- Appeals to: California Court of Appeal; 6th Appellate District
- Website: santaclara.courts.ca.gov

Presiding Judge
- Currently: Hon. Julie A Emede
- Since: Jan 1, 2025
- Lead position ends: Dec 31, 2026

Assistant Presiding Judge
- Currently: Hon. Eric S. Geffon
- Since: Jan 1, 2025
- Lead position ends: Dec 31, 2026

Court Executive Officer
- Currently: Rebecca J. Fleming
- Since: Dec 12, 2016

The Superior Court of California, County of Santa Clara is the state trial court in and for Santa Clara County, California.

== History ==
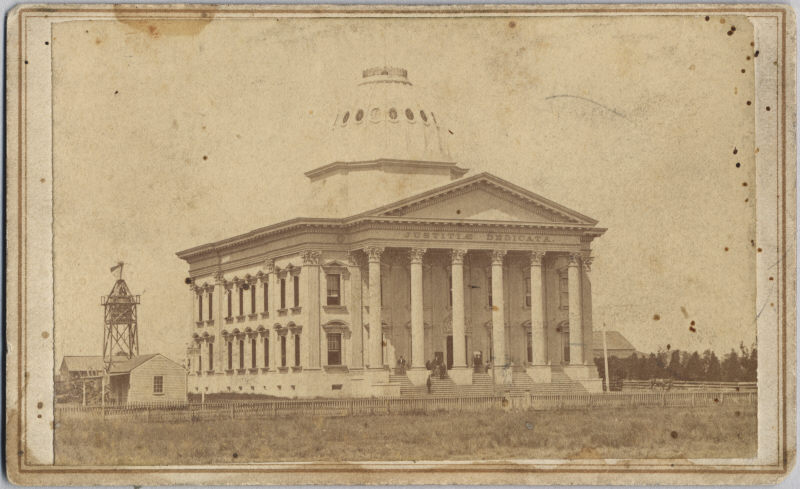
1868 County Courthouse (photographed in 1869, one year after completion)

San Jose was chosen as the initial site for the state's capitol in 1849, which it held until 1851, when legislators voted to move to Vallejo. After Santa Clara County was formed on April 25, 1851, a contest was held to select a design for a new building worthy of being a state capitol in 1860. The winning entry, designed by Levi Goodrich, was constructed from 1866 to 1868 at a cost of US$173,737.96 (equivalent to $4,100,000 in 2024).

The courthouse was destroyed by fire in May 1931. Reconstruction work began in December 1931 and completed in August 1932; a dedication ceremony for the reconstructed courthouse was held on September 17. As originally completed in 1868, the courthouse was topped by a copper-covered dome; the copper sheathing melted in the intense heat from the 1931 fire and the dome was removed during reconstruction. After the disastrous 1931 fire and rebuilding, it survives today as the Old Courthouse, which was listed on the National Register of Historic Places as part of the St. James Square National Historic District in 1979.

A modern courthouse was completed in 1964, replacing an older Hall of Records which had been built adjacent to the county courthouse. The Hall of Justice, located a few blocks to the north, was completed in 1991. The Family Justice Center was completed in 2016, consolidating court operations from six different facilities in a single building.

The doctrine of corporate personhood in US law is commonly traced to the 1886 decision of the United States Supreme Court in Santa Clara County v. Southern Pacific Railroad, which started in this court.

== Courthouses ==
Santa Clara County Superior Court locations:
1 Downtown Superior, 191 N 1st St (San Jose)
Family Justice, 201 N 1st St (San Jose)
Old Courthouse, 161 N 1st St (San Jose)
Notre Dame, 99 Notre Dame Ave (San Jose, closed 2016)
Park Center Family Court, 170 Park Ave (San Jose, closed 2016)
Terraine, 115 Terraine St (San Jose, closed 2016)
2 Hall of Justice, 190 W Hedding St (San Jose)
Juvenile Justice, 840 Guadalupe Pkwy (San Jose)
Ruff Drive, 935 Ruff Dr (San Jose, closed 2008)
3 Palo Alto, 270 Grant Ave (Palo Alto)
4 Santa Clara, 1095 Homestead Rd (Santa Clara)
5 South County, 301 Diana Ave (Morgan Hill)
6 Sunnyvale, 605 W El Camino Real (Sunnyvale, closed 2016)
- Downtown Superior Court, Downtown San Jose
- Family Justice Center, Downtown San Jose
- Hall of Justice, San Jose
- Juvenile Justice Courthouse, San Jose
- Old Courthouse, Downtown San Jose
- Palo Alto Courthouse, Palo Alto
- Santa Clara Courthouse, Santa Clara
- South County Courthouse, Morgan Hill

Closed

- Park Center Family Court, Downtown San Jose (closed August 15, 2016)
- Notre Dame Courthouse, Notre Dame Avenue, Downtown San Jose (closed August 22, 2016)
- Ruff Drive Courthouse, Ruff Drive, San Jose (closed 2008)
- Sunnyvale Courthouse, Sunnyvale (closed August 15, 2016)
- Terraine Courthouse, Terraine Street, Downtown San Jose (closed August 22, 2016)

== Areas Served ==
The Court serves the Incorporated Cities, Towns & Census Designated Places of Santa Clara County. (Incorporated Cities and or Towns are marked with an asterisk (*).)

- Alum Rock
- Burbank
- Cambrian Park
- Campbell*
- Cupertino*
- East Foothills
- Fruitdale
- Gilroy*
- Lexington Hills
- Los Altos*
- Los Altos Hills*
- Los Gatos*
- Loyola
- Milpitas*
- Monte Sereno*
- Morgan Hill*
- Mountain View*
- Palo Alto*
- San Jose*
- San Martin
- Santa Clara*
- Saratoga*
- Stanford
- Sunnyvale*

== Judges ==
=== Present ===
The following judicial officers serve on the Superior Court of California, Santa Clara County, as of June 2019:

- Charles F. Adams
- Javier Alcala
- Julia L. Alloggiamento
- Mary E. Arand
- Jacqueline M. Arroyo
- Kenneth Paul Barnum
- Thang Nguyen Barrett
- Paul R. Bernal
- Brooke A. Blecher
- Arthur Bocanegra
- Griffin M. J. Bonini
- Shelyna V. Brown
- David A. Cena
- Sharon A. Chatman
- Vincent J. Chiarello
- Frederick S. Chung
- L. Michael Clark
- Paul O. Colin
- Le Jacqueline Duong
- Julie A. Emede
- Rebeca Esquivel-Pedroza
- Micael Estremera
- Andrea E. Flint
- Maureen A. Folan
- Jose S. Franco
- Eric S. Geffon
- Matthew S. Harris
- Robert Hawk
- Roberta S. Hayashi
- Cindy Seely Hendrickson
- Joseph H. Huber
- Audra Ibarra
- Nahal Iravani-Sani
- Nicole Isger
- Peter H. Kirwan
- Nona L. Klippen
- Thomas E. Kuhnle
- Kelley Kulick
- Sunil R. Kulkarni
- Edward Frederick Lee
- Cynthia C. Lie
- Patricia M. Lucas
- Katherine Lucero
- Stephen V. Manley
- Socrates Peter Manoukian
- JoAnne McCracken
- Beth A. R. McGowen
- Michele McKay McCoy
- William J. Monahan
- Daniel T. Nishigaya
- Carol W. Overton
- Lori E. Pegg
- Evette D. Pennypacker
- Elizabeth C. Peterson
- Mark H. Pierce
- Hector E. Ramon
- Amber Rosen
- Christopher G. Rudy
- Deborah A. Ryan
- Panteha E. Saban
- Shawna M. Schwarz
- Stuart J. Scott
- Cynthia A. Sevely
- Julianne Sylva
- Drew C. Takaichi
- Patrick E. Tondreau
- James E. Towery
- Jesus Valencia, Jr.
- Brian Walsh
- Joshua Weinstein
- Helen E. Williams
- Charles E. Wilson, II
- Erica R. Yew
- Theodore C. Zayner
- Vanessa A. Zecher
- Carrie A. Zepeda

=== Commissioners ===
- Christine Copeland
- Jillian M. Laxton
- Johanna Thai Van Dat
- Benjamin Williams
- Erik S. Johnson

=== Notable past judges ===
- Ray J. Cunningham
- LaDoris Cordell
- Edward J. Davila
- Jeremy Fogel
- Mary Greenwood
- Eugene Michael Hyman
- Lucy H. Koh
- Jack Komar
- Mary Jo Levinger
- Aaron Persky, Recalled by voters in 2018 after his sentencing of Brock Turner in People v. Turner
