= Downtown Historic District (San Jose, California) =

Historic district in California, United States

- San Jose Downtown Historic District
- U.S. National Register of Historic Places
- U.S. Historic district
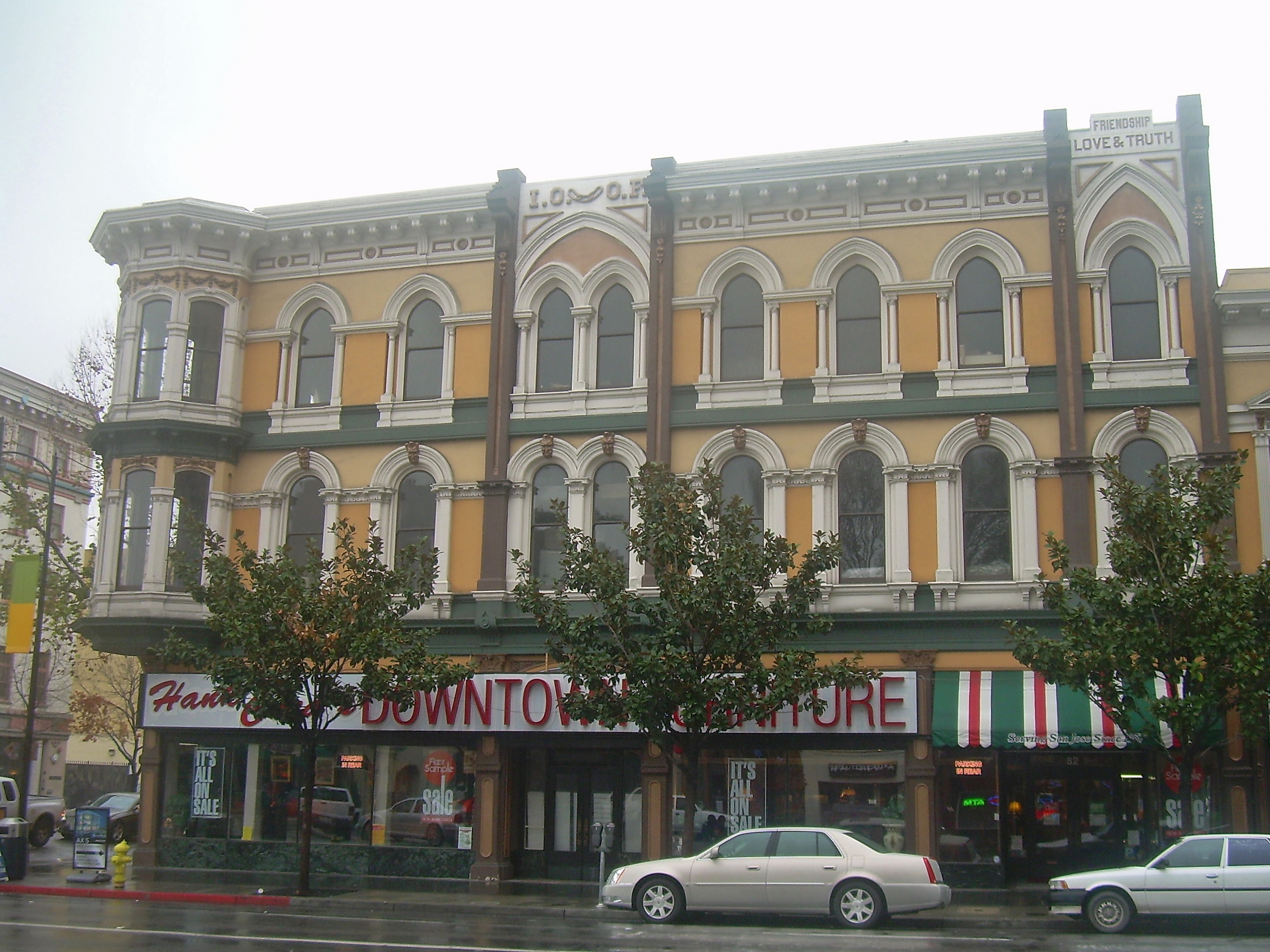
- A historic commercial building in the San Jose Downtown Historic District.

- Location within San Jose, California Location within California Location within the United States
- Location: San Jose, California
- Coordinates: 37°20′4.29″N 121°53′14.06″W
- NRHP reference No.: 83003822
- Added to NRHP: May 26, 1983

The Downtown Historic District of San Jose, California is a designated U.S. Historic District area of the city roughly the size of one square block. It is bounded by S. First Street to the west, E. San Fernando Street to the south, S. Third Street to the east, and E. Santa Clara Street to the north, but also includes the south side of E. Santa Clara Street between Third and Fourth Streets.

== Introduction ==
As Santa Clara Valley's mercantile and financial center for the past 100 years, San Jose's downtown historic commercial district is significant both from a historic and an architectural perspective. The downtown commercial district retains the highest concentration of older buildings in the downtown, which reflects the best examples of architecture from almost every period in the growth of the city. It is the prime example in Santa Clara County in its broad representation of historic California commercial architecture.

The district has been listed on the National Register of Historic Places and contains buildings of six different architectural styles: Italianate, Romanesque Revival, Victorian, Edwardian, Neoclassical, Mission Revival, and Spanish Colonial Revival.

== History ==
Soon after the Mexican–American War, the city was surveyed first by Thomas Campbell in 1847 and later by Chester Lyman, in 1848, following the standard grid street pattern utilizing traditional Spanish pathways. This street pattern has remained virtually unaltered to this day. The development of American commercial areas in San Jose extended into this newly surveyed area, just east of the original pueblo site of 1797 (relocated from the 1777 site after major flooding).

In the 1870s and mid-1880s, the heart of downtown commercial activity had moved northward along Market Street (immediately west of First Street and part of the Pueblo) to the Santa Clara Street intersection. However, by the latter part of the 1880s, Santa Clara and First Streets became the new focus for downtown business activity. The early horse-drawn railway systems reinforced the importance of this intersection with single and, later, double tracks located along both streets.

During this period, Italianate and Romanesque Revival styles dominated. This was a group of buildings designed by the finest local architects and built by the leading citizens of the time: James D. Phelan, F. Sourisseau, C. T. Ryland, Martin Murphy's descendants and the Auzerais family. Buildings such as the Knox-Goodrich Building at 34 South First Street, with its extreme rustication, reflect the qualities of the wealthy, orchard oriented, agricultural community of the turn-of-the-century.

Following the 1906 San Francisco earthquake, Edwardian and Neoclassical commercial buildings replaced the damaged Victorian and Romanesque businesses. In addition, Mission Revival, California's first indigenous architecture, dominated smaller commercial architecture. Spanish Colonial Revival also provided California with a new historic architectural mode.

During the 1930s, 1940s and 1950s, modernization and further consolidation characterized the downtown core. New growth patterns to the west and south of the center of the city changed the commercial desirability of the downtown core area of San Jose. New construction was virtually nonexistent until the government sponsored redevelopment programs of the 1960s began razing of entire center city blocks for planned new development.

== Architectural landmarks ==
=== Late 19th-century buildings ===
- Knox-Goodrich Building, 1889
- La Rosa Pharmacy, 1870
- Letitia Building, 1890
- Oddfellows Building, 1883 (Italianate)
- Security Building, 1892 (Romanesque Revival)

=== Early 20th century ===
- Landmark Square, 1907
- Bank of America building, 1926 – San Jose's first skyscraper, at fourteen stories
- Jose Theater (Mission Revival)
- "El Paseo" shopping block, 1920s (Spanish Colonial Revival)
