= Fountain Alley =

Pedestrian paseo

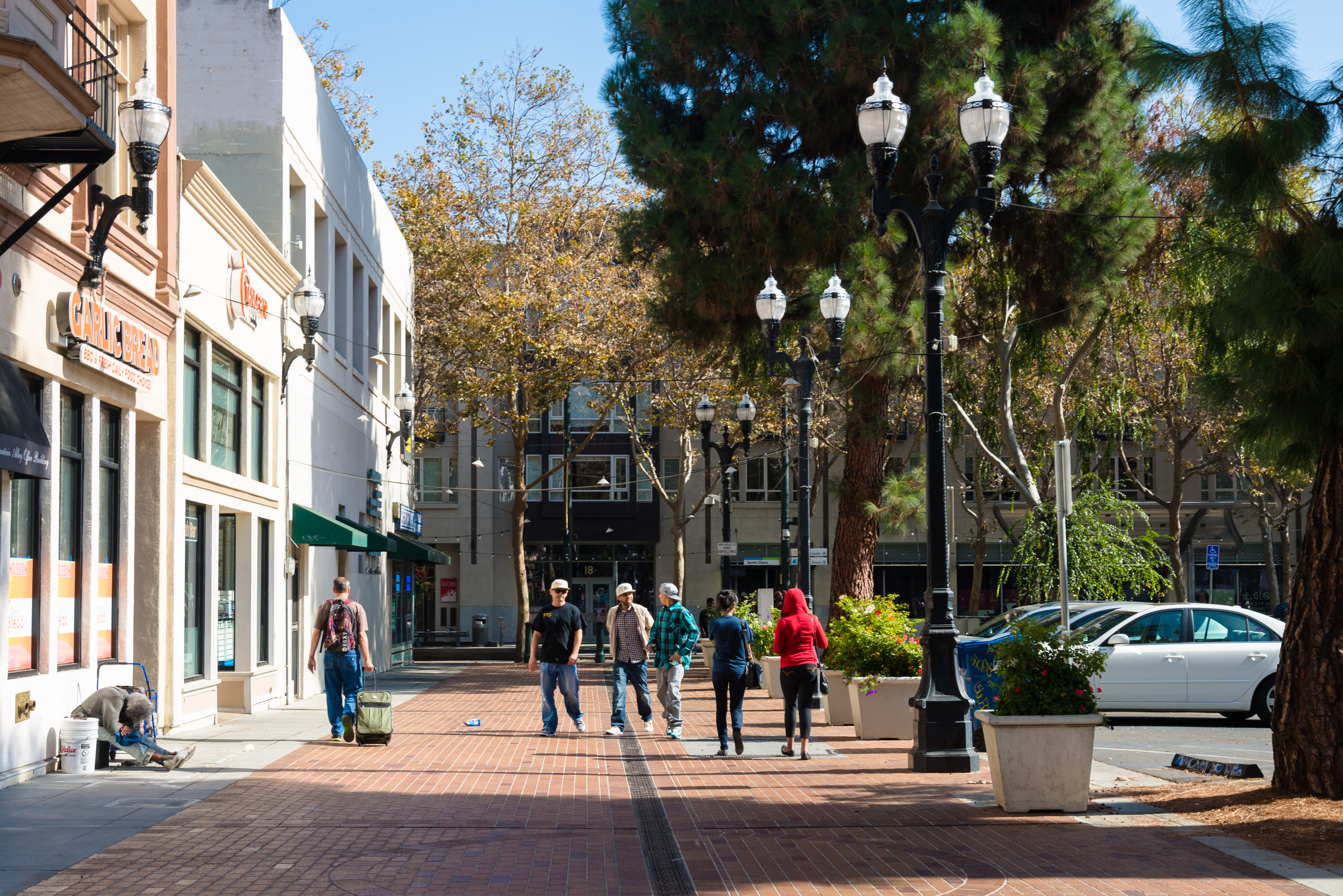
- Interactive map of Fountain Alley
- Type: Pedestrian paseo
- Length: 320 ft (98 m)
- Location: San Jose State University, San Jose, California
- Coordinates: 37.3358°N 121.8898°W

Fountain Alley is a pedestrian paseo in Downtown San Jose between 1st Street and 2nd Street.

== History ==
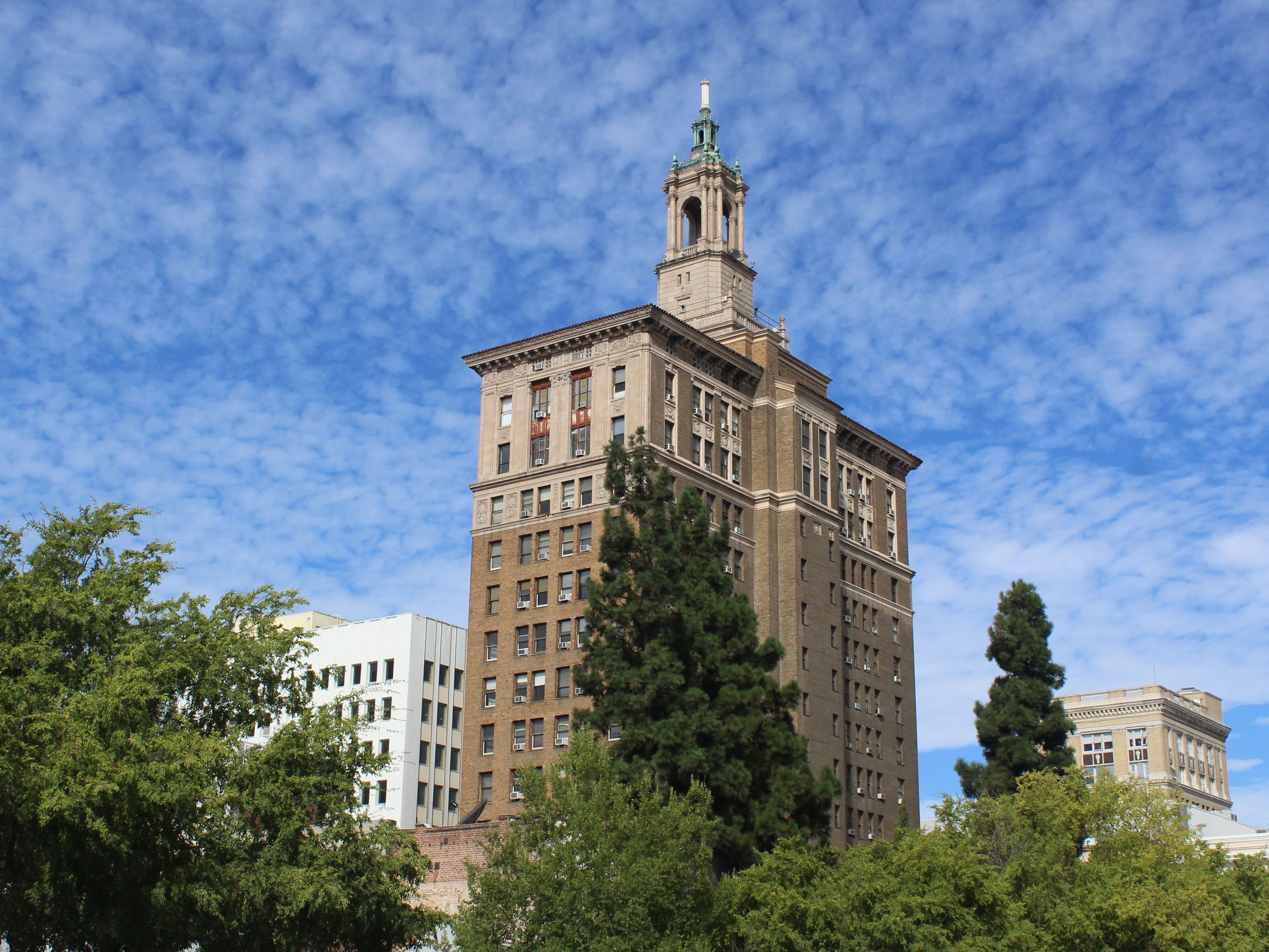
View of the historic Bank of Italy Building from Fountain Alley.

Fountain Alley's origins lie in the 19th century as a thin but prominent alley made up of mews and a horse trough, which gave it its name.

Originally a one block lane, Fountain Alley was first known as Archer Street, named for attorney Lawrence Archer who lived at the Second Street end. In 1854 William Campbell drilled an artesian well at First and Santa Clara Streets which flooded the area as far west as Market Street. To relieve the overflow, a ditch was dug down the alley to drain off the water.

On May 14, 1855, Frank Lightston, a pioneer among San Jose's Yankee settlers, officially transferred ownership of the alley to the city. A year following, City Alderman Moody suggested renaming it "Fountain" to mirror its association with the nearby well. Despite its official designation as "Fountain Street," the term "alley" gained popularity among San Jose residents, leading local maps, and signposts to adopt the name "Fountain Alley" by the 1330s. By 1861, this thoroughfare became an early beneficiary of gas street lamps in San Jose. Fountain Alley has hosted commercial structures since the 1870s. The most prominent among these was an extension of the L-shaped McLaughlin and Ryland Building, positioned at the southeast corner of First and Santa Clara Streets. Between 1884 and 1889, alterations were made to the eastern section of the McLaughlin and Ryland Building.

The Bank of Italy Building, San Jose's oldest skyscraper, was built on the alley in 1925.

Fountain Alley lost its urban importance in the late 20th century, when it became notable as a crime hotspot. Since the 2010s, the alley has been the site of an ongoing revitalization program, which has ended the area's crime streak and introduced public events, like tailgates and pop-ups.

== See also ==
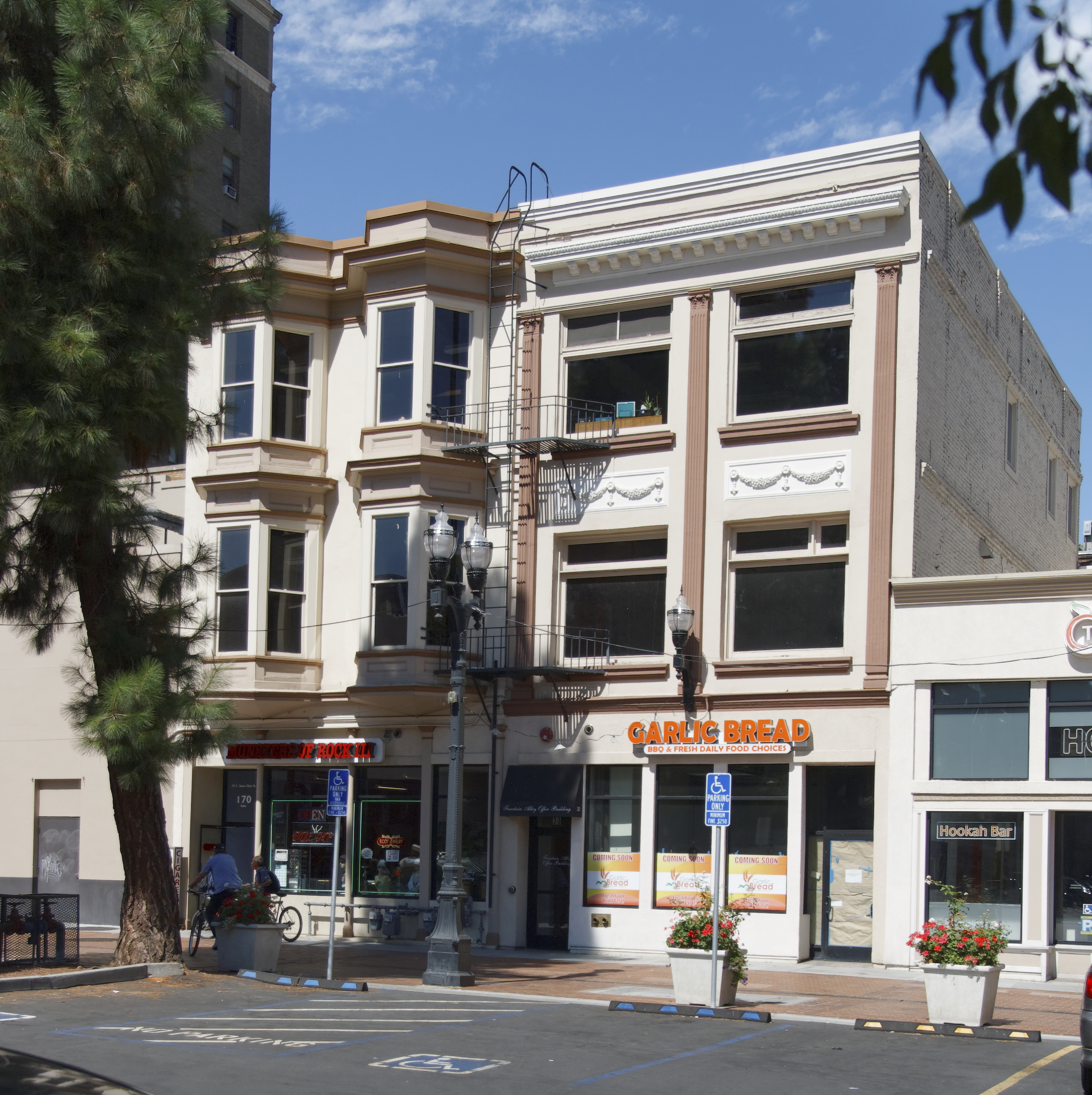
30 Fountain Alley is a National Historic Landmark.

- Paseo de San Antonio
- 27–29 Fountain Alley
