= Moitozo Park =

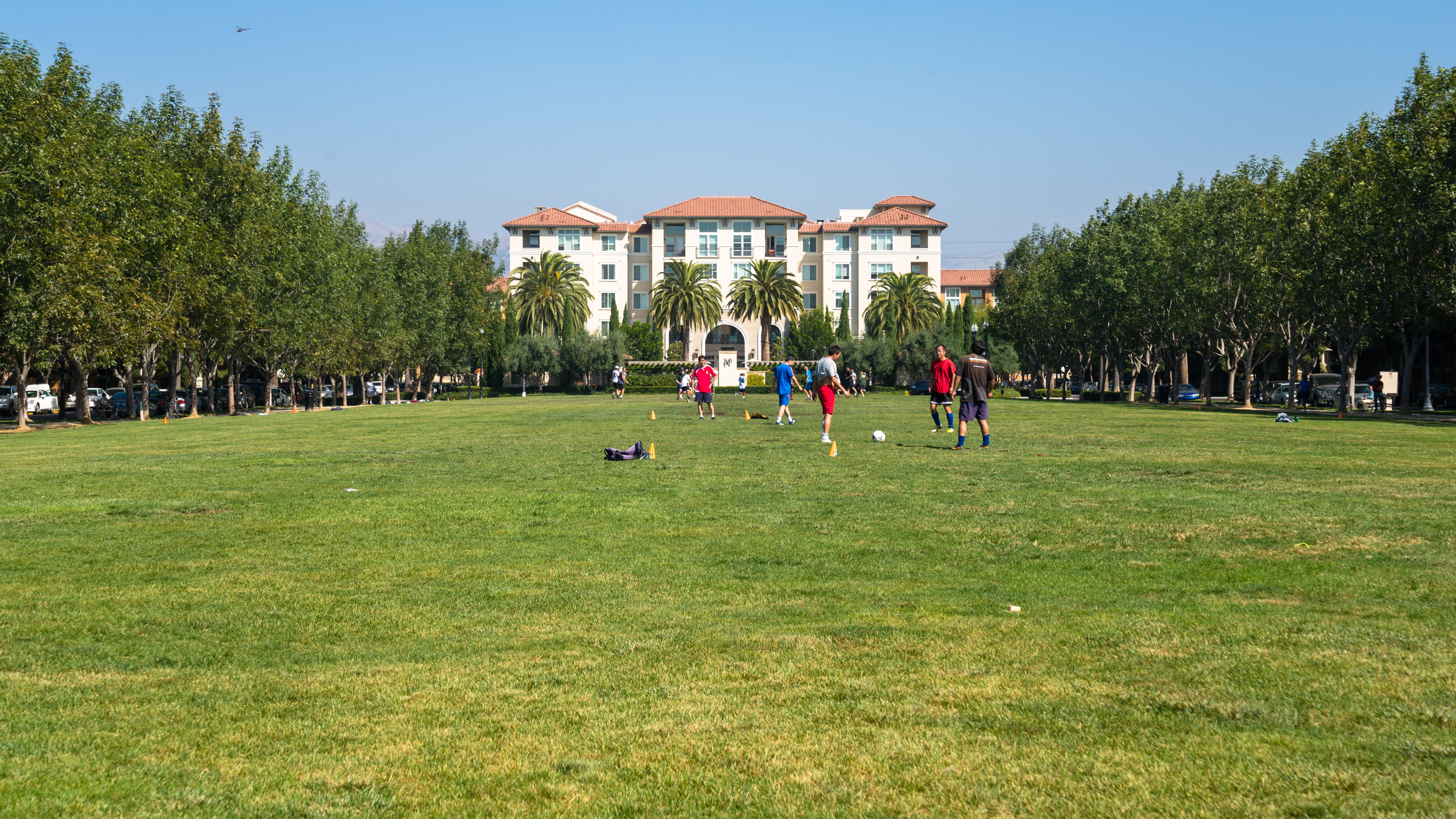
- Interactive map of Moitozo Park
- Location: San Jose, California
- Coordinates: 37.4058°N 121.9415°W
- Area: 6.3 acres (2.5 ha)

Moitozo Park is a park in San Jose, California, located in the Rincon district of North San Jose.

== History ==
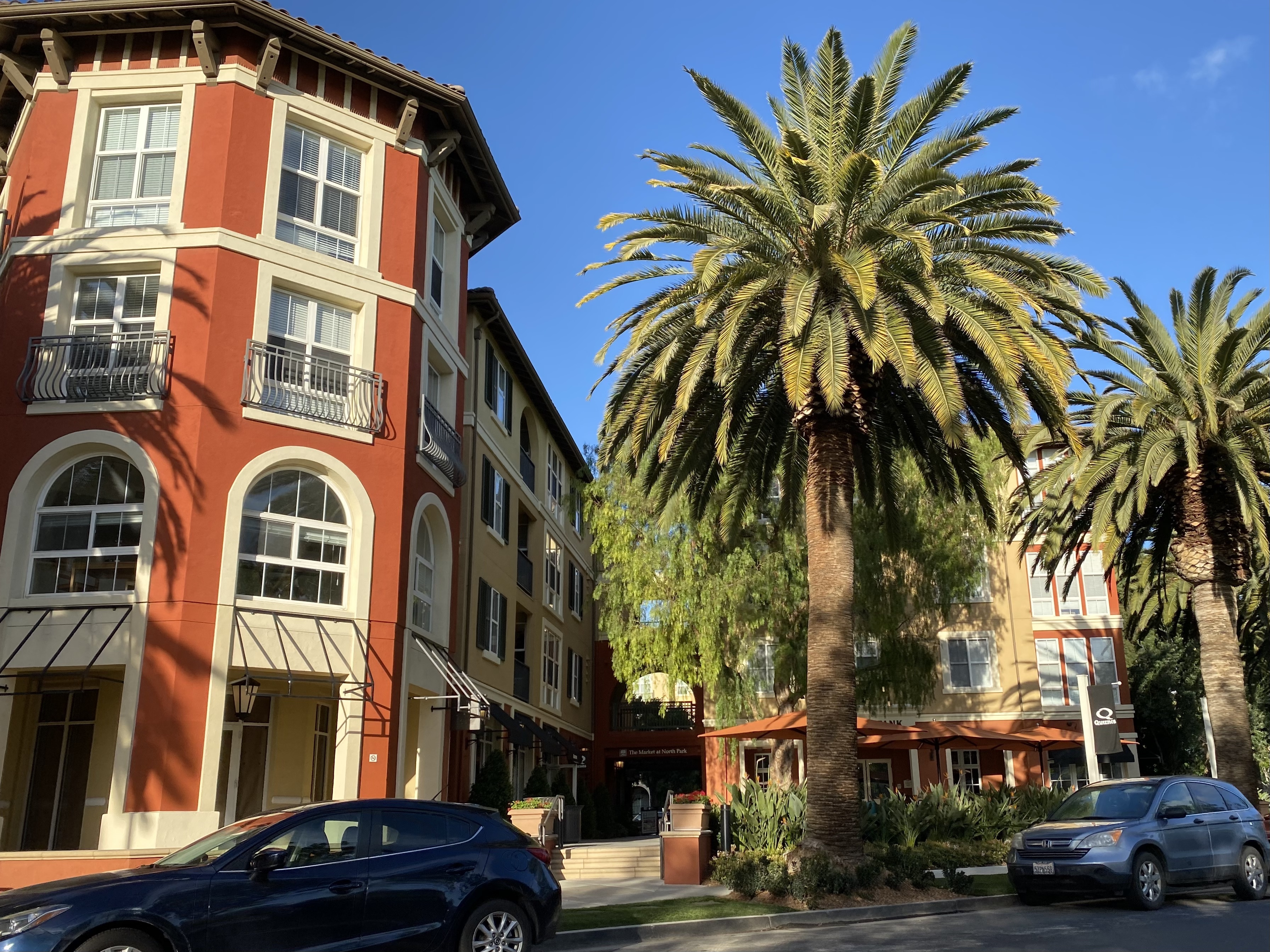
Shops on Rio Robles on the northern side of Moitozo Park.

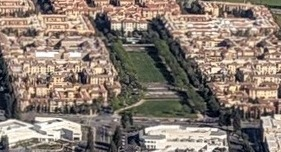
Aerial view of Moitozo Park.

Moitozo Park was laid out and dedicated in 2003.

The park is named after the Moitozo family, a long-established Portuguese-American family of San Jose, of Azorean origin, which had owned much of the land in the area since the 1920s.

== Location ==
Moitozo Park is a large alameda (tree-lined park) in North San Jose's Rincon district, located on North 1st Street and Río Robles.

It is located within walking distance of the River Oaks station and Tasman station on the VTA light rail.

== See also ==
- North San Jose
