= Riverview Park (San Jose) =

Park in San Jose, California

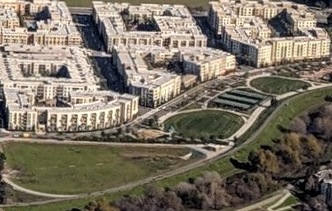
- Interactive map of Riverview Park
- Location: San Jose, California
- Coordinates: 37.4058°N 121.9415°W
- Area: 5.2 acres (2.1 ha)

Riverview Park is a park in San Jose, California, located along the Guadalupe River in the Rincon district of North San Jose.

== History ==
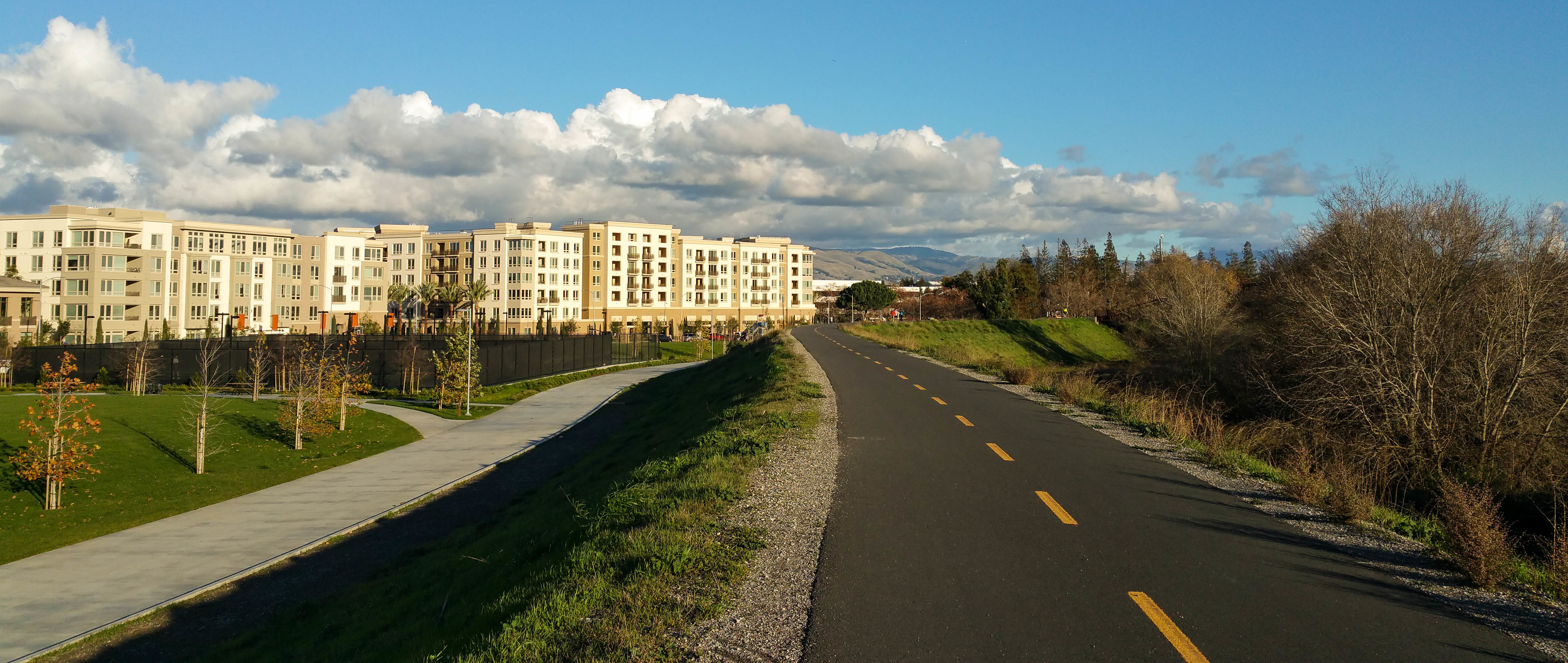
View of Riverview Park from the Guadalupe River Trail.

The park was laid out and dedicated in 2015.

A pedestrian bridge connects the park to the historic James Lick Mansion across the Guadalupe River, the 19th century estate built by local land baron James Lick who was the wealthiest man in California, at the time of his death in 1870.

== Location ==
Riverview Park is a large riverside park located on the eastern bank of the Guadalupe River, in the Rincon district of North San Jose.

The Guadalupe River Trail passes along the park's edge with the river.

It is located within walking distance of the River Oaks station on the VTA light rail.

== See also ==
- North San Jose
