= Rincon de los Esteros, San Jose =

Rincon de los Esteros Innovation Triangle / Golden Triangle
- Neighborhood of San Jose
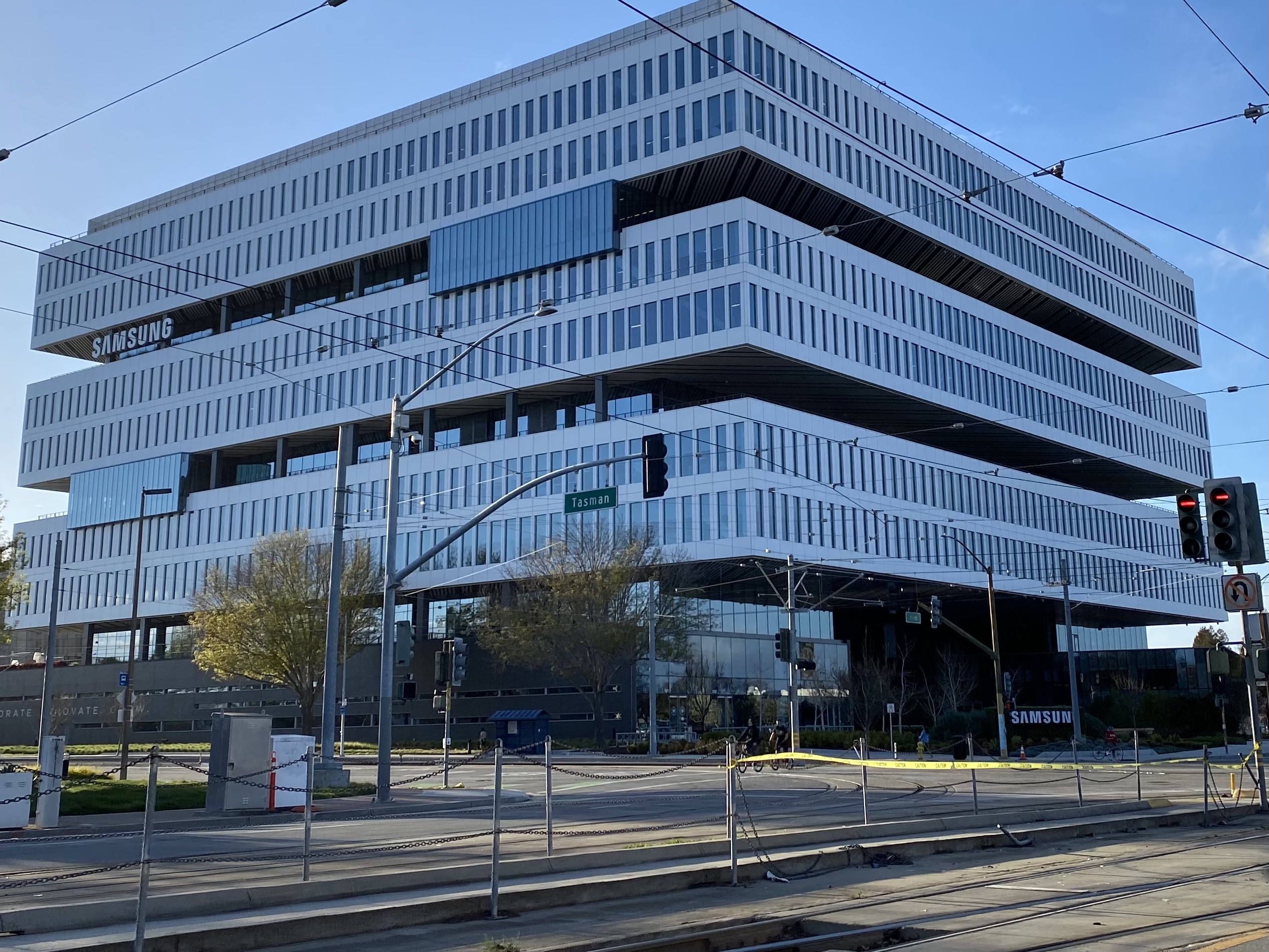
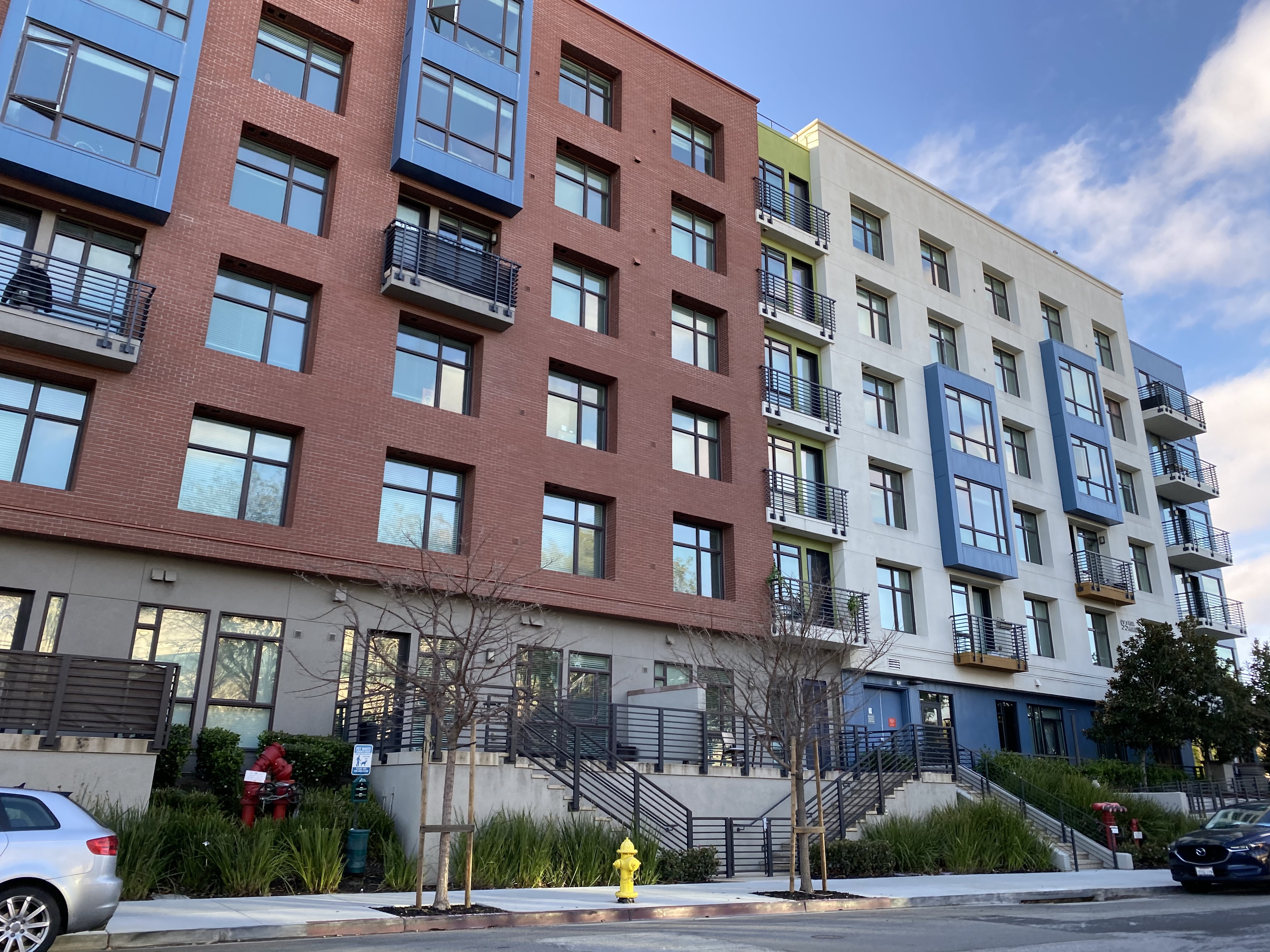
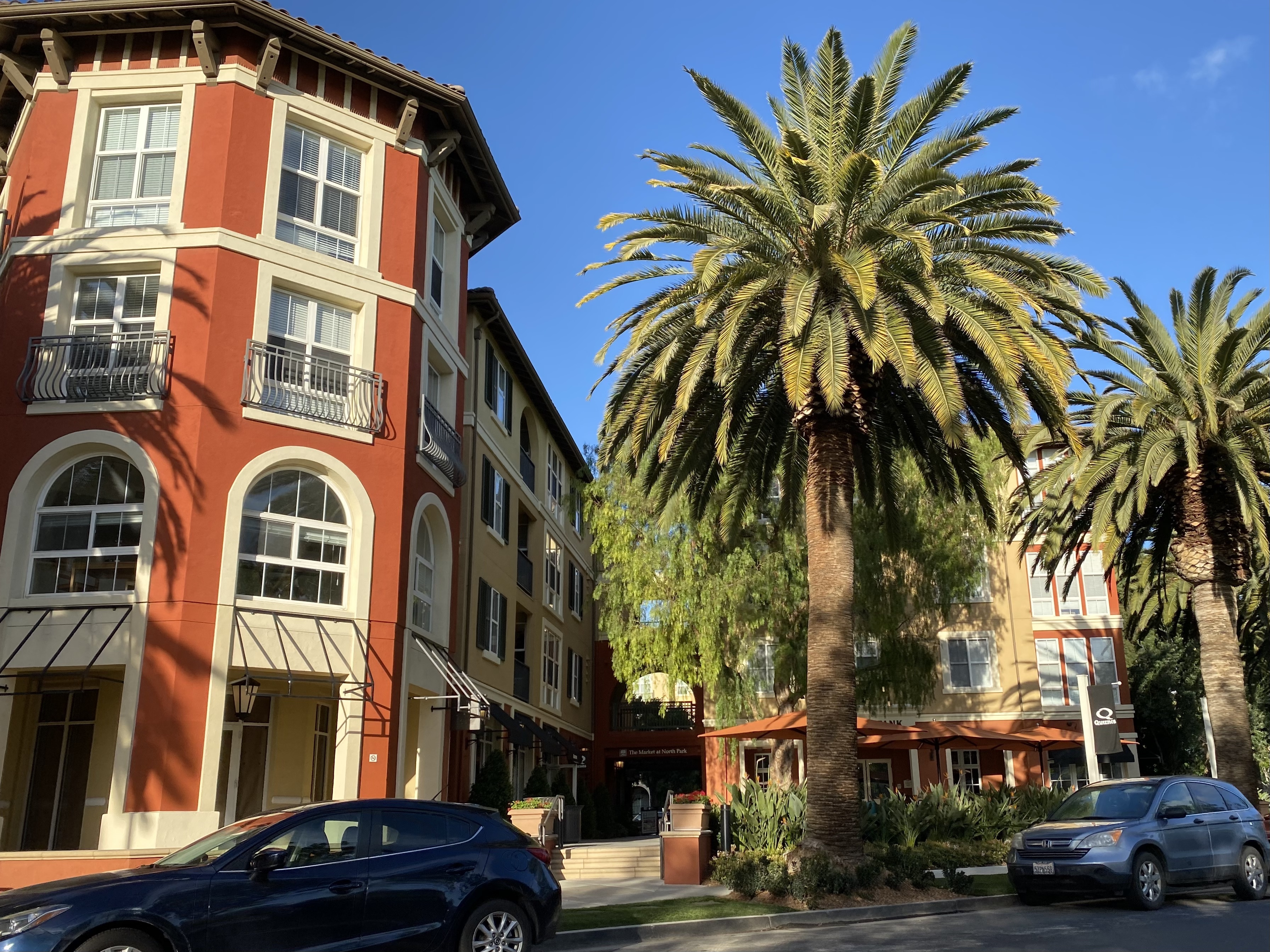
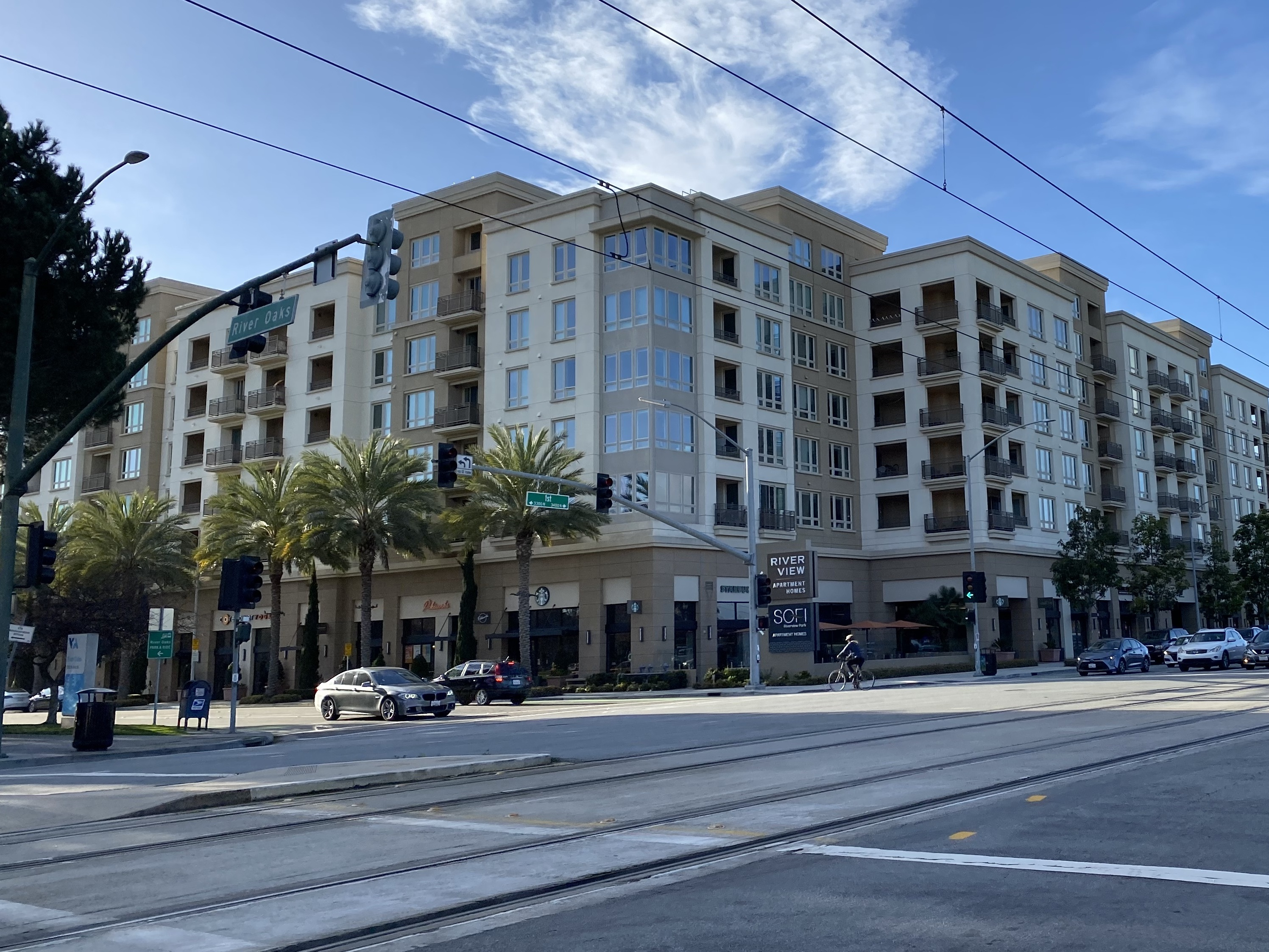
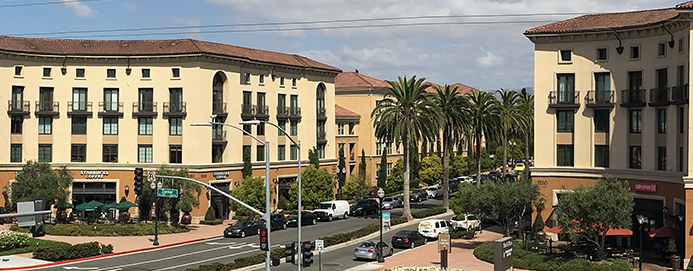
- Clockwise from top left: Samsung headquarters; apartments on Vista Montaña; corner of North 1st St & River Oaks Parkway; shops on Vilaggio St; shops on Moitozo Park.

- Location within San Jose
- Coordinates: 37.38965°N 121.93024°W
- Country: United States
- State: California
- County: Santa Clara
- City: San Jose

Rincon de los Esteros, also known as Innovation Triangle, the Golden Triangle, the Innovation District, or simply as Rincon, is a vast district of San Jose, California, making up a significant portion of North San Jose. The district has one of the largest concentrations of high tech company headquarters and campuses in Silicon Valley.

== History ==
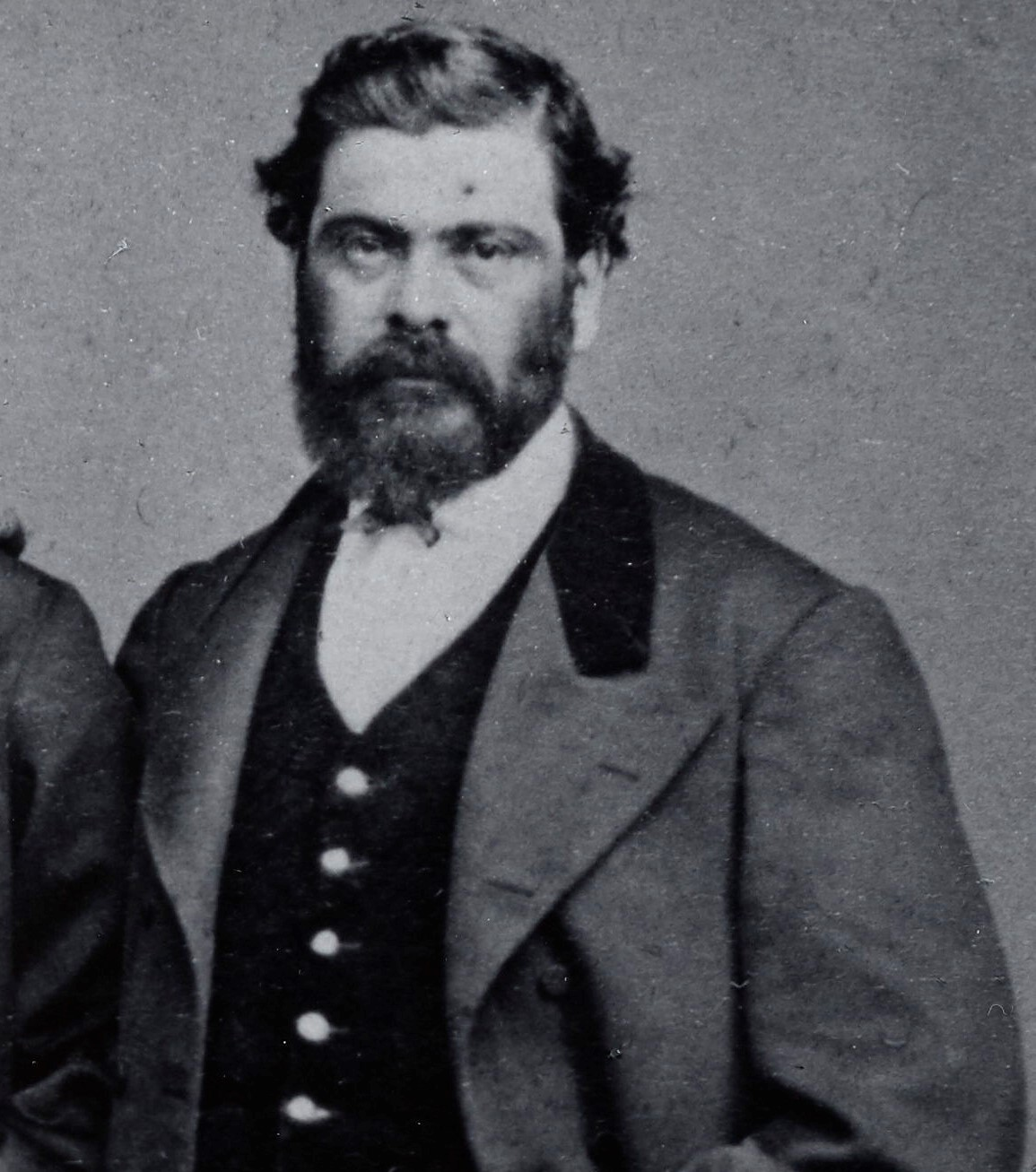
Rancho Rincón de los Esteros was granted to Ignacio Alviso in 1838.

The Rincon de los Esteros district of San Jose has its origins in the old Rancho Rincón de los Esteros, a Mexican-era rancho granted to local Californio ranchero Ignacio Alviso by Governor Juan Bautista Alvarado in 1838. The rancho would later come into the possession of the Berryessa family of California, a prominent Californio family in the Bay Area.

For much of the 19th and early 20th century, most of Rincon was occupied by orchards and fruit farms, like much of the rest of Santa Clara Valley prior to the high-tech industrial boom of Silicon Valley.

In 1974, the government of San Jose instituted the Rincon de los Esteros Redevelopment Plan, to develop the Rincon de los Esteros district into a major tech hub for Silicon Valley.

In 1998, the city established a specific plan for Rincon South, which has since been a separate neighborhood from the rest of Rincon.

== Economy ==
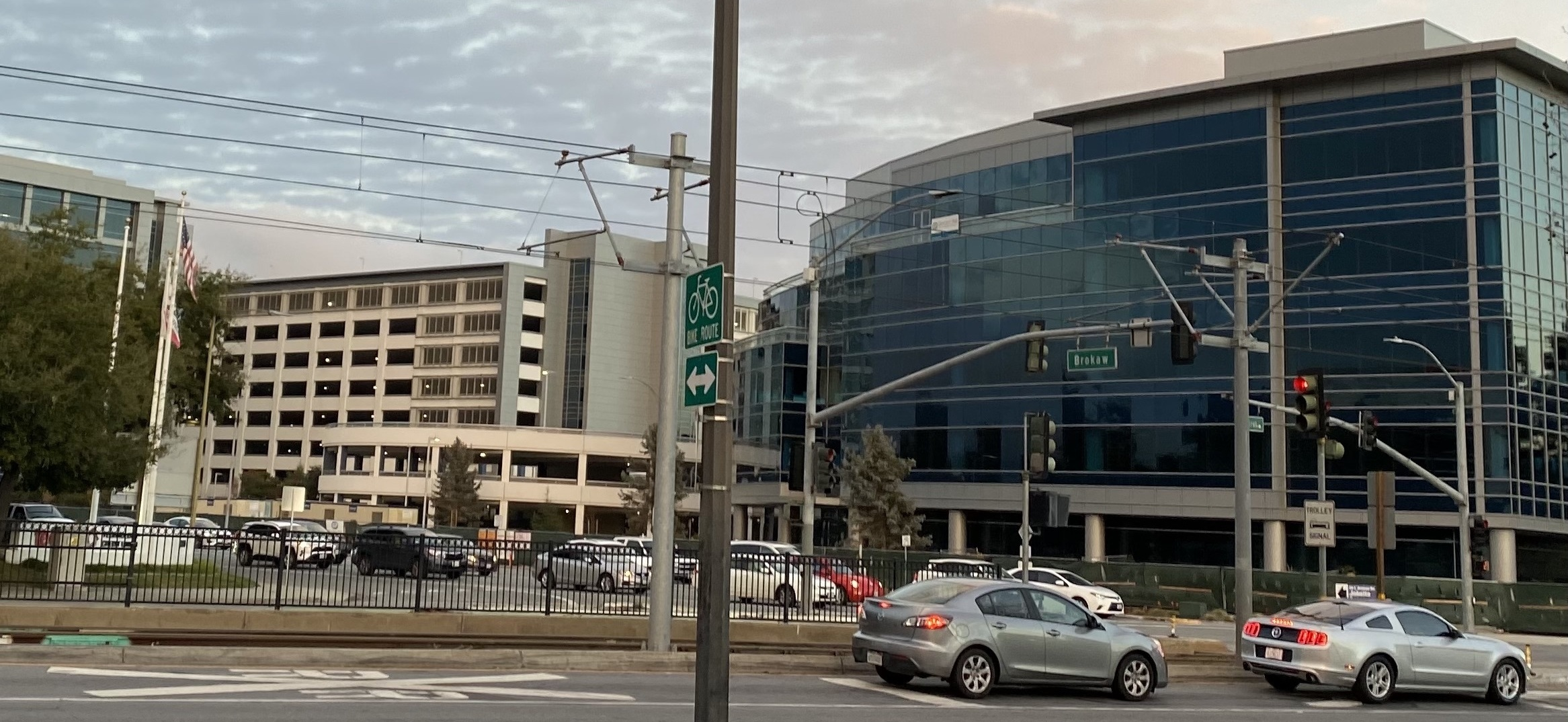
Corner of Brokaw & North 1st.

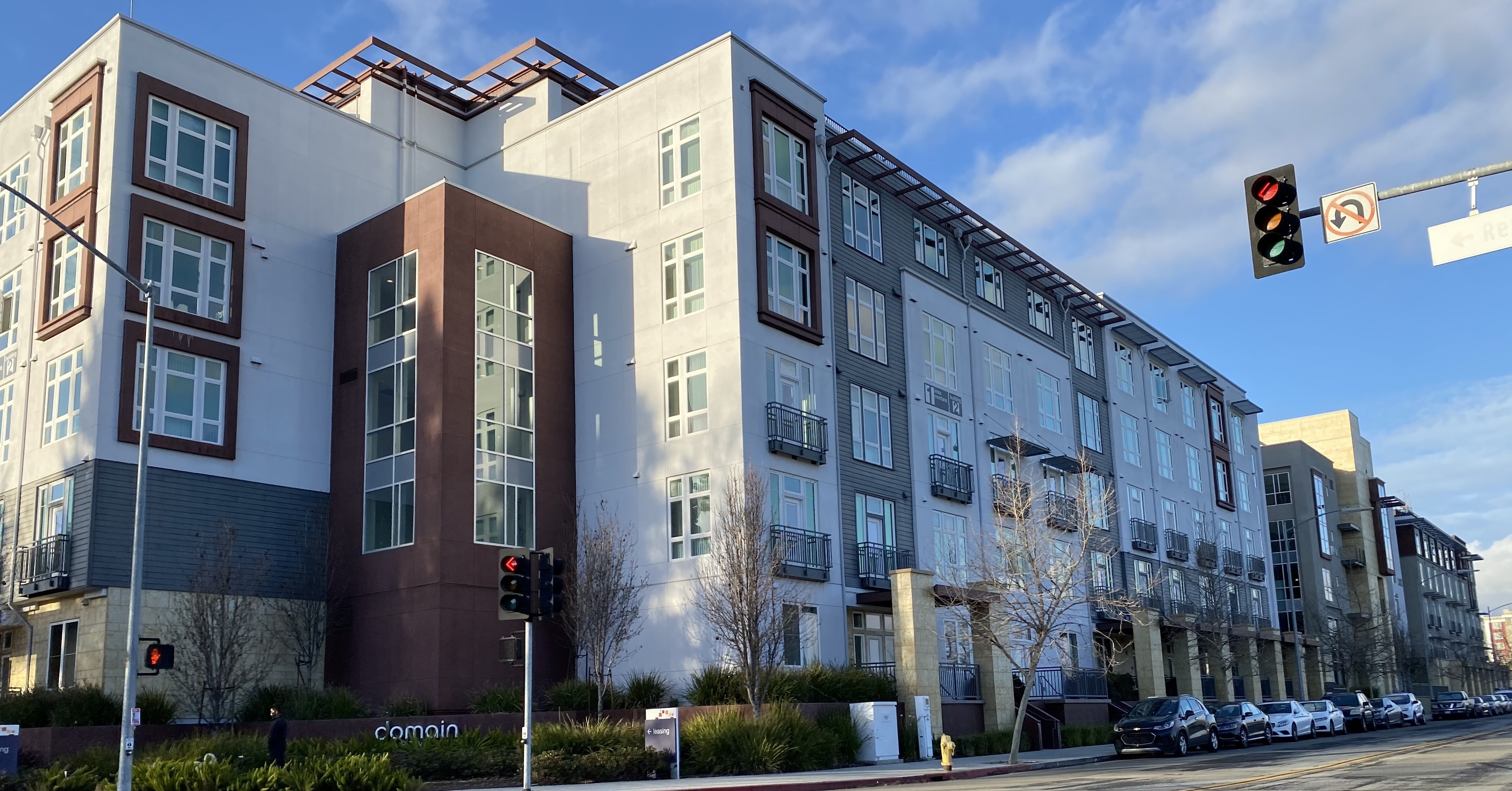
Apartments on Vista Montaña.

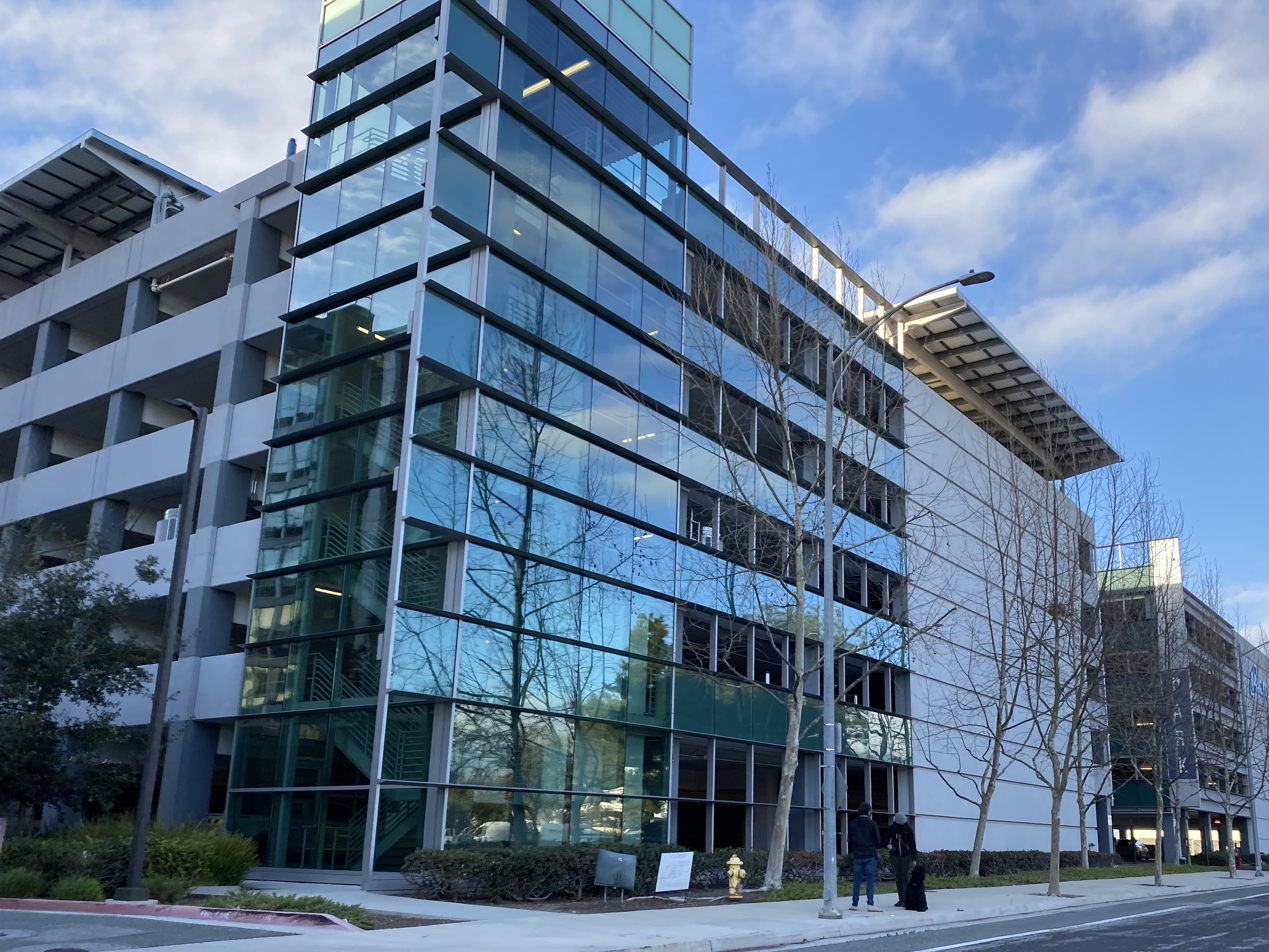
Offices on Vista Montaña.

Rincon is also known as Innovation Triangle and is one of the most important high tech hubs in Silicon Valley.

Over 81,000 people work in the district. One in five residents in the district have a STEM degree.

=== Companies ===
Companies that have their main headquarters, regional headquarters, or other offices in the district:

- Amazon
- A10 Networks
- Align Technology
- Ansys
- Atmel
- Bill.com
- Brocade Communications Systems
- Broadcom
- Cisco Systems
- Cadence Design Systems
- Flex
- F5 Networks
- Hewlett Packard Enterprise
- Immersion Corporation
- Intel
- Logitech
- MapR
- Microchip Technology
- NetScout Systems
- Nio
- Nutanix
- PayPal
- Qualcomm
- Samsung Electronics
- Sanmina Corporation
- Xperi
- Zscaler
- Bloom Energy

== Geography ==
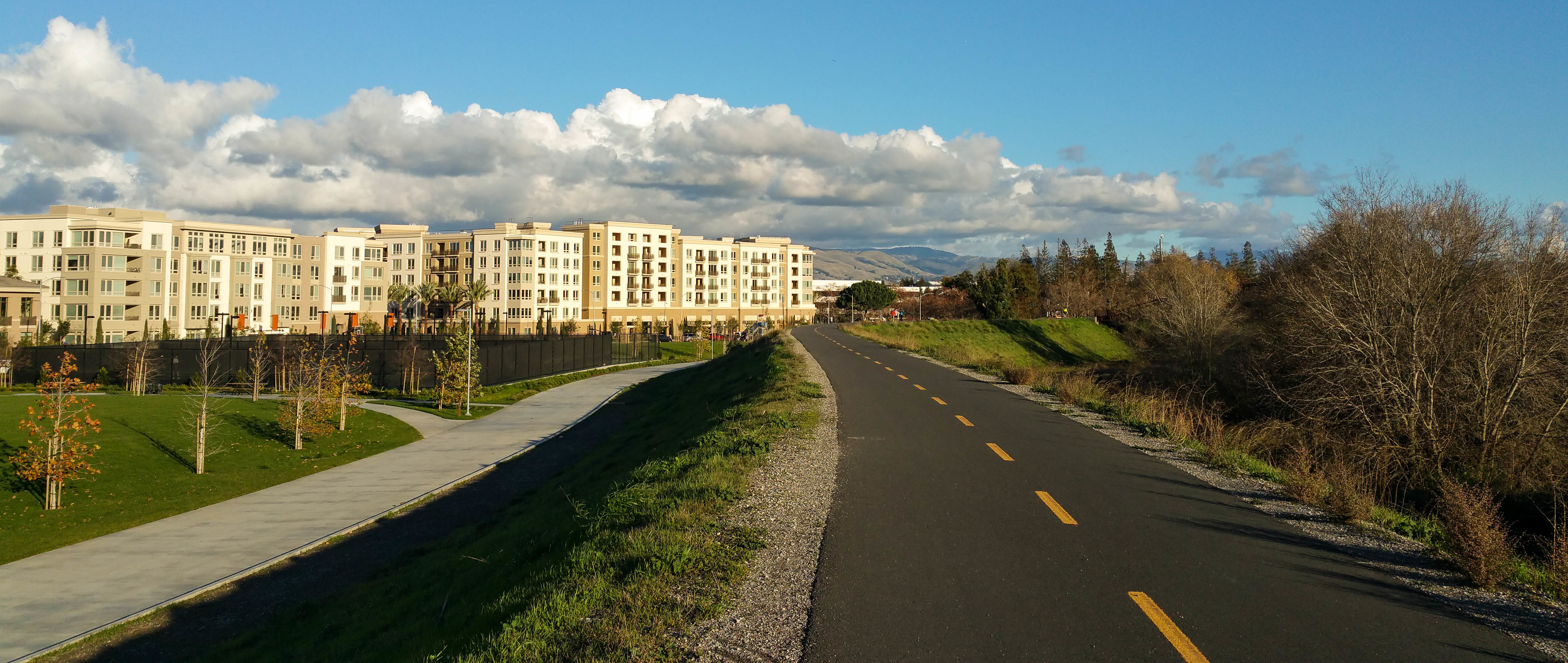
The Guadalupe River Trail passing along Riverview Park (on the left).

Though Rincon makes up much of the land of the former Rancho Rincón de los Esteros, its borders are different from those of the old rancho. Rincon's northern boundary is formed by the South Bay Freeway (CA 237), which separates Rincon from Alviso. Rincon's southern border is made up by the confluence of the Bayshore Freeway (US 101) and the Nimitz Freeway (I-880), which separate Rincon from Rincon South. Its eastern boundary is formed by Coyote Creek, which separates it from Berryessa and Milpitas. Its western boundary is formed by the Guadalupe River, which separates it from Santa Clara.

== Education ==
Much of Rincon is served by the Santa Clara Unified School District.

The University of Silicon Valley is located within the district.

== Parks and plazas ==
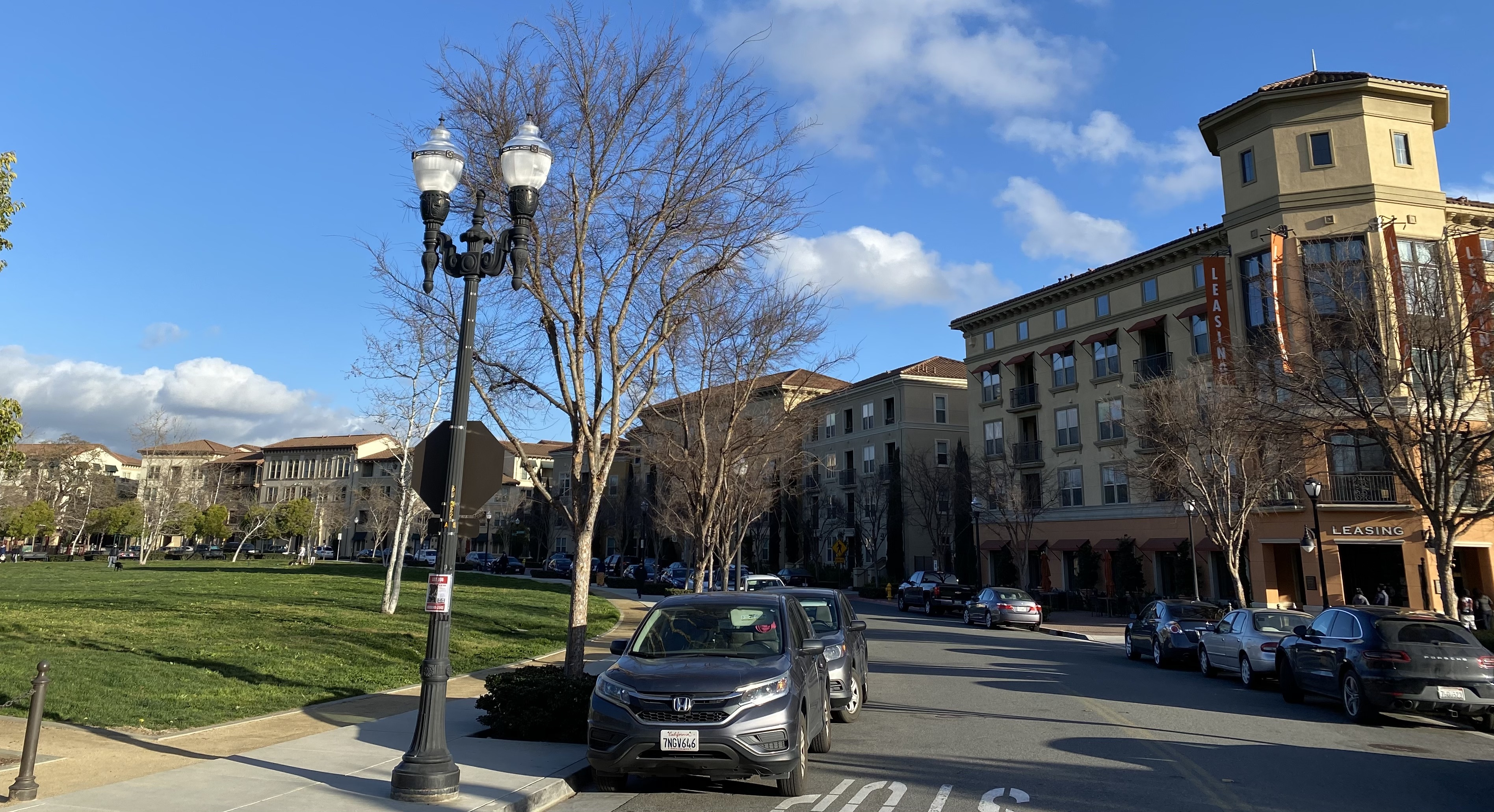
River Oaks Park.

There are also an abundance of bike and walk/run paths in the area, including the Guadalupe River Trail and the Coyote Creek Trail.

Parks in the area include:

- Moitozo Park
- Riverview Park
- River Oaks Park
- Vista Montaña Park
- Iris Chang Park
