= River Oaks Park =

Park located in California

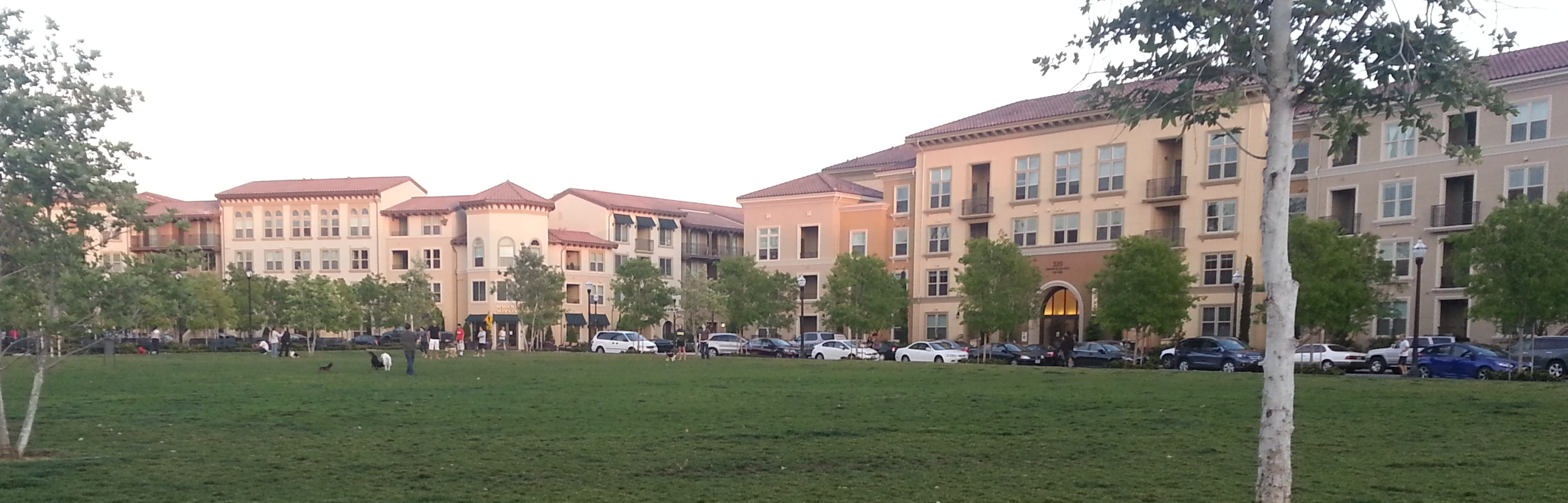
- Interactive map of River Oaks Park
- Location: San Jose, California
- Coordinates: 37.4037°N 121.9302°W
- Area: 5 acres (2.0 ha)

River Oaks Park is a park in San Jose, California, located in the Rincon district of North San Jose.

== History ==
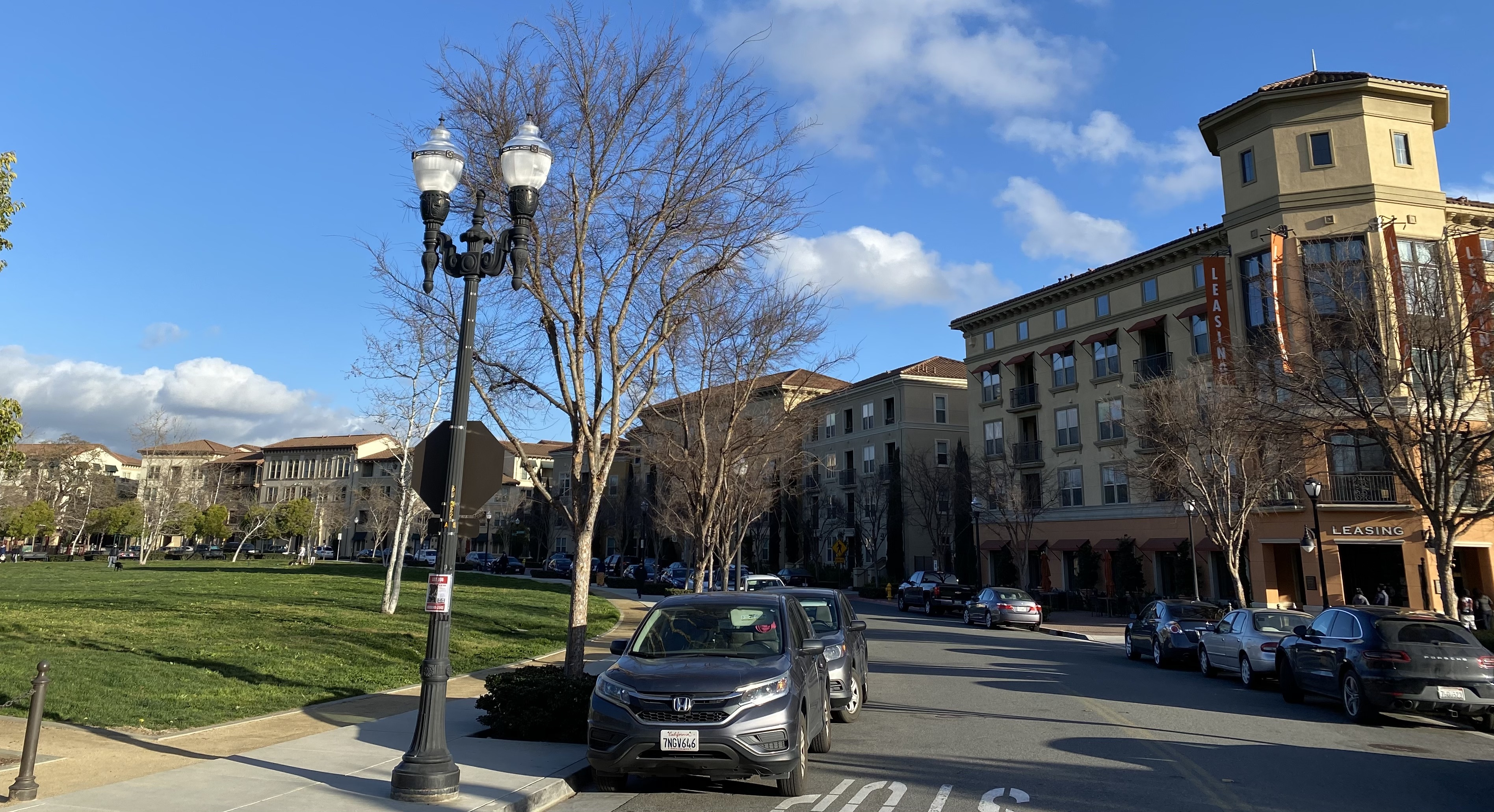
Buildings facing River Oaks Park.

The park was built and dedicated in 2013, on the site of Sony's former Silicon Valley manufacturing facility.

The land where River Oaks Park and much of its surroundings sit today was once part of the River Oaks Ranch, owned by the Okuba family, a well-established Japanese-American family of San Jose. During World War II, the Okuba family were sent to internment camps, but eventually returned to reclaim their land after the war.

== Location ==
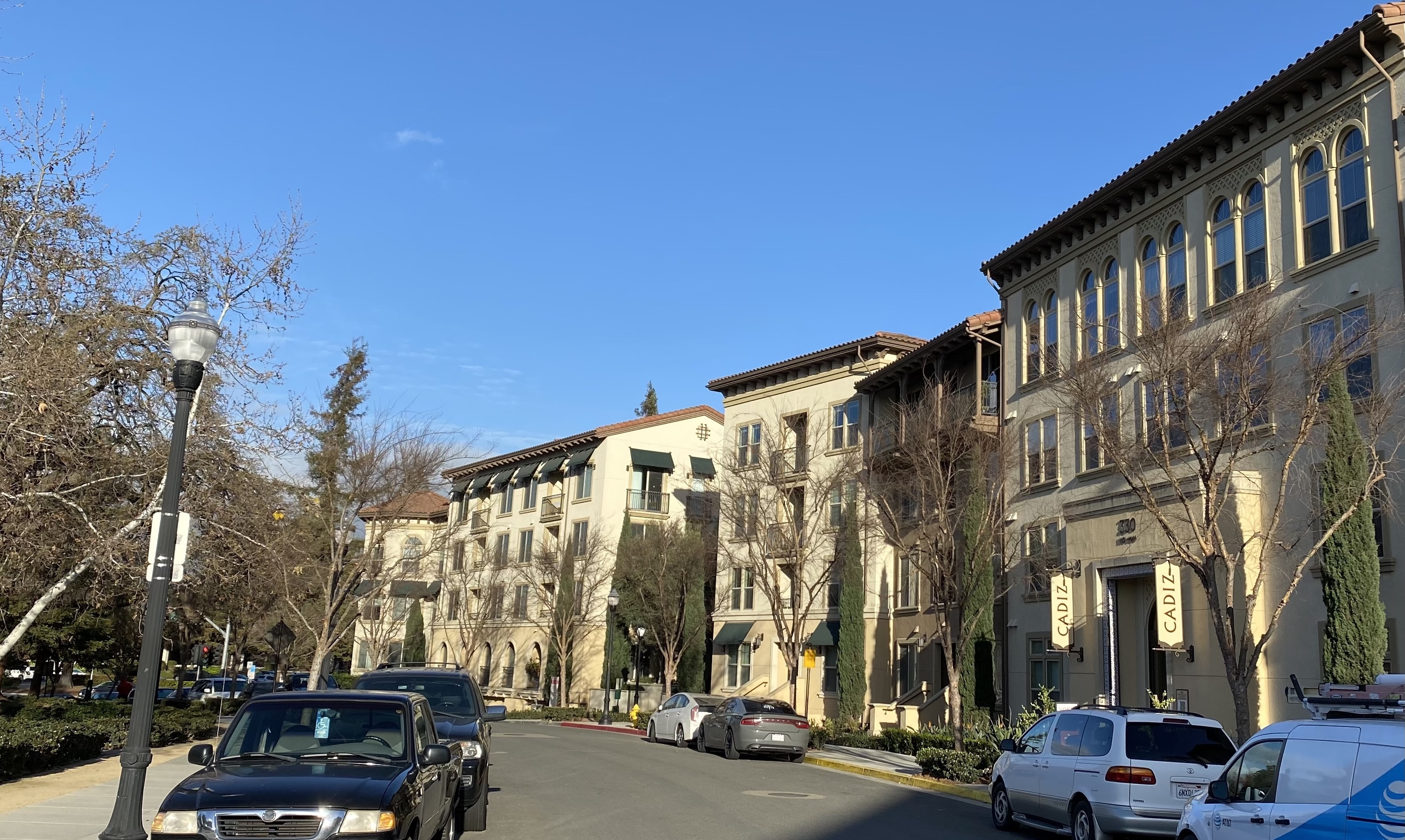
Apartment buildings on the park.

River Oaks Park is a crescent-shaped park located on the River Oaks Parkway, an important thoroughfare in the Rincon district of North San Jose.

It is located within walking distance of the River Oaks station on the VTA light rail.

== See also ==
- River Oaks station
