= Rancho Rincón de los Esteros =

Mexican land grant

Coordinates: 37.440°N 121.930°W

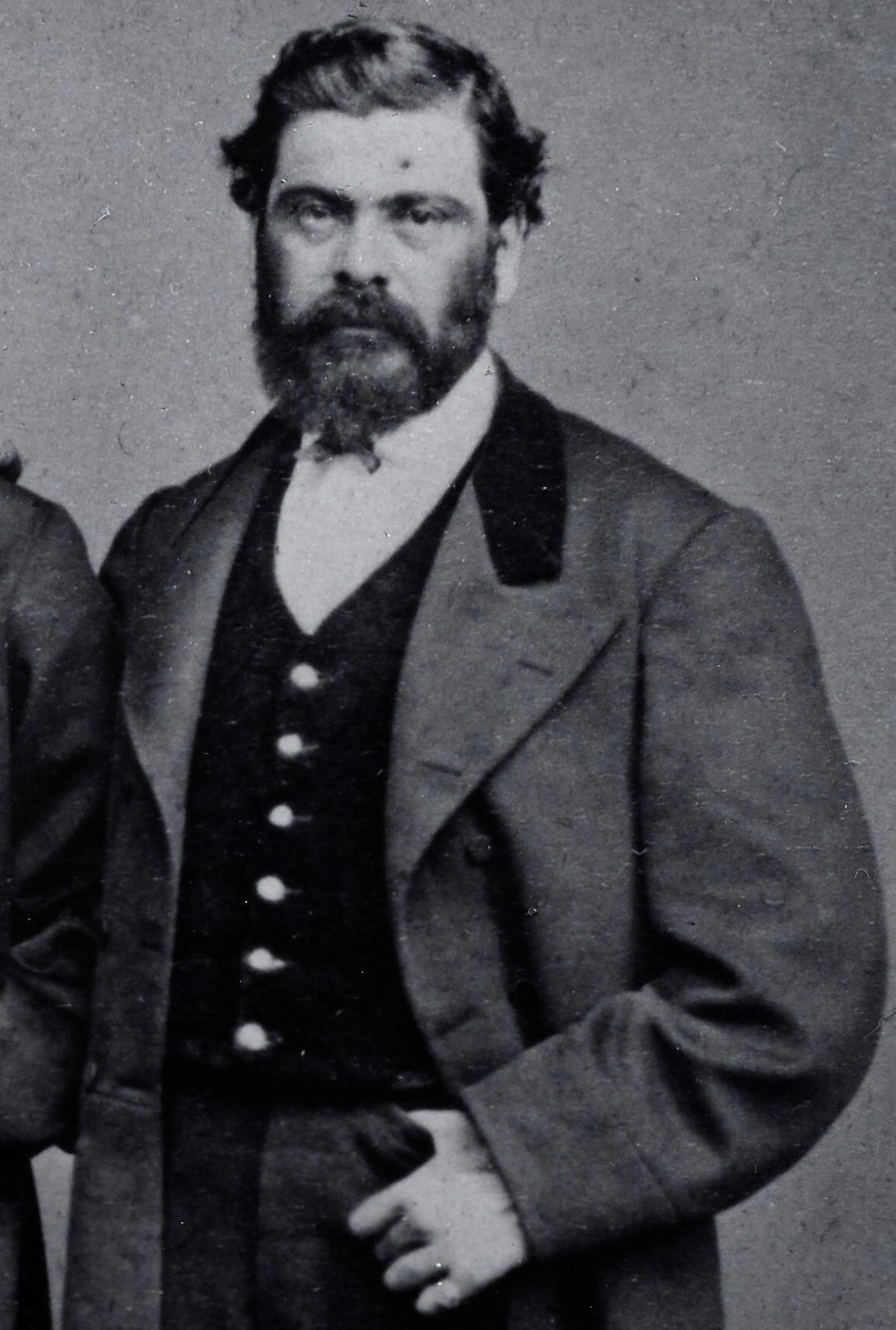
Rancho Rincón de los Esteros was granted to Ignacio Alviso in 1838.

Rancho Rincón de los Esteros was a 6,353-acre (25.71 km^{2}) Mexican land grant in present-day Santa Clara County, California, United States.

It was given by Governor Juan Bautista Alvarado in 1838 to Ignacio Alviso. The name means Estuaries Corner or Estuaries Bend, in reference to the local estuaries.

The ranch was located within the present day Santa Clara County, on the southern shore of San Francisco Bay between the Guadalupe River and Coyote Creek outflows.

== History ==
Ignacio Alviso (1772 - 1848), the son of Domingo Alviso, one of the members of the De Anza Expedition, was a soldier at the San Francisco Presidio, and retired in 1838. The city of Alviso was named after Ignacio.

With the cession of California to the United States following the Mexican-American War, the 1848 Treaty of Guadalupe Hidalgo provided that the land grants would be honored. As required by the Land Act of 1851, three claims for three separate parts of Rancho Rincón de los Esteros were filed with the Public Land Commission. A claim by Rafael Nicanor Alviso (1840–1904) was filed with the Commission in 1852, who was awarded 2,200 acres (8.9 km^{2}) in 1872.

The second claim was filed by Francisco Berryessa (of the Berryessa family of California) et al. with in 1852 and a patent for 1,844 acres (7.5 km^{2}) awarded in 1873. Francisco Berreyesa was the son of Guadalupe Berreyesa (1816–1850) and Maria Dolores Alviso (1817–1850), who was daughter of Ignacio Alviso and Margarita Bernal.

The third claim was filed by Ellen E. White in 1852, with a patent for 2,308 acres (9.3 km^{2}) awarded in 1862. Charles White (1823–1853), a native of Ireland who came overland from Missouri in 1846 with his wife, Ellen E. White, and two children, was one of San Jose's wealthiest citizens in the half-dozen years before and after statehood. He was alcalde of the Pueblo of San José in 1848. White also owned Rancho Cholame and Rancho Pala. Charles White was killed in the explosion of the steamboat "Jenny Lind" en route from Alviso to San Francisco on April 11, 1853.

Originally the Mexican rancho extended between Arroyo Penitencia in the east to Rio Guadalupe in the west. By the time the US courts confirmed the grant, the portion east of Coyote Creek had been lost to settlers in Milpitas.

The marshy land, only a few feet above sea level in most places, was used for cattle grazing after the original grant. Numerous orchards existed on the land in the early 1900s, with lettuce growth beginning in the 1970s.

== Legacy ==
Today, multiple locations within San Jose bear the name of the rancho. The Rincon de los Esteros (or simply Rincon) district and Rincon South neighborhoods of North San Jose cover the majority of the former ranch.

Rincón de los Esteros is also the name of a housing project within the Rincon district.

== See also ==
- Berreyesa family
- Ranchos of Santa Clara County, California
