= Rincon South, San Jose =

Neighborhood of San Jose, California, United States

Rincon South
- Neighborhood of San Jose
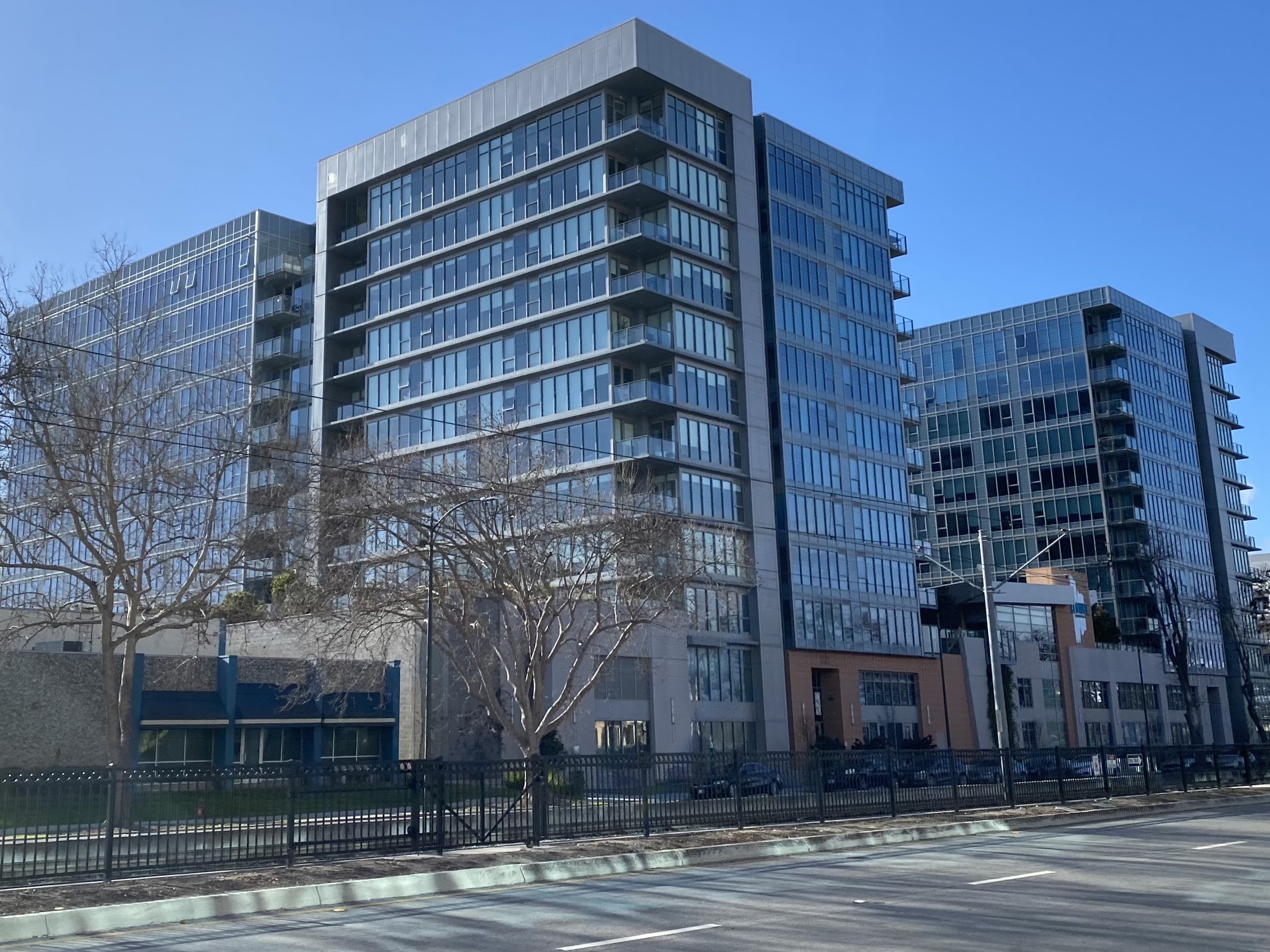
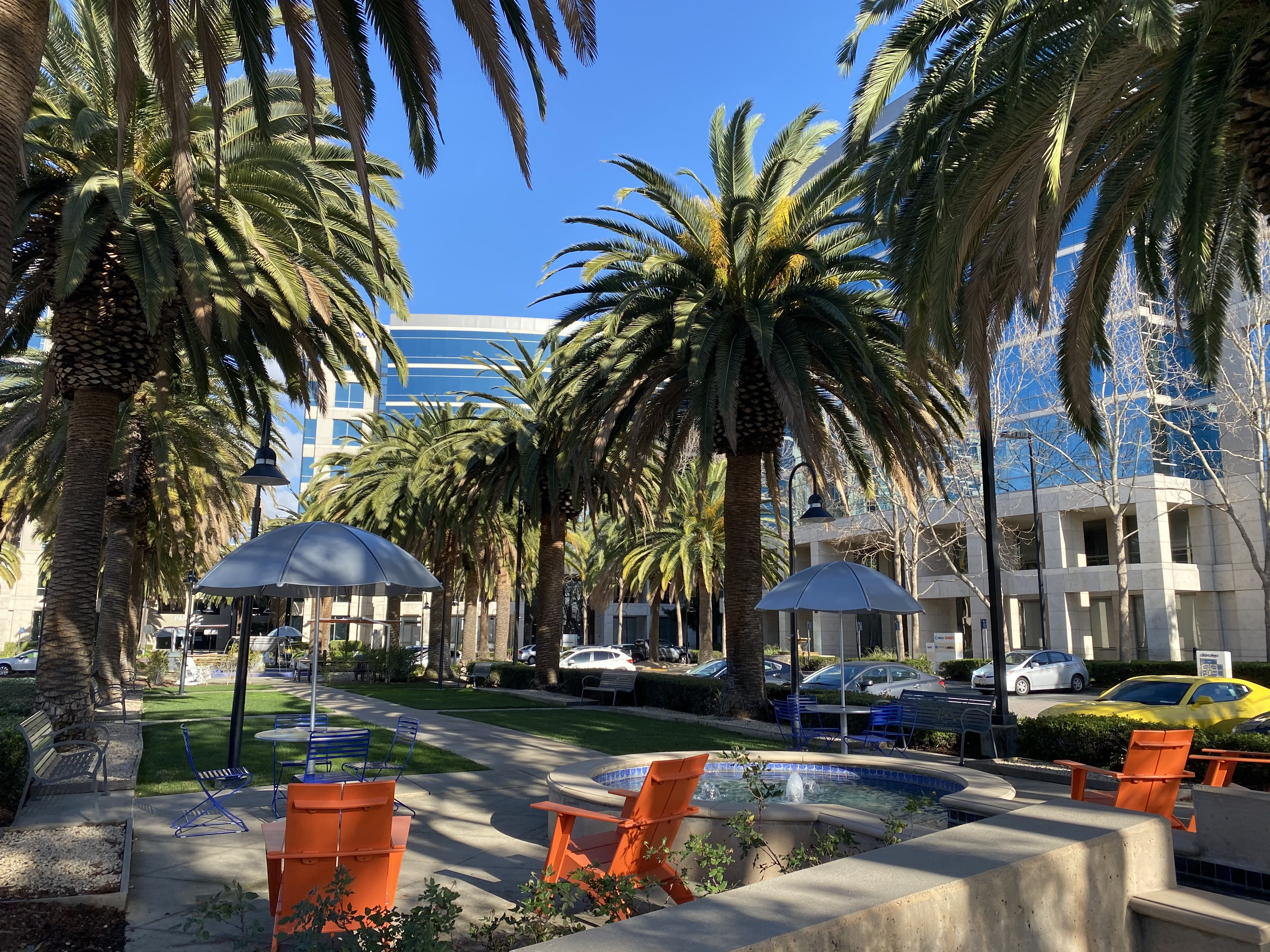
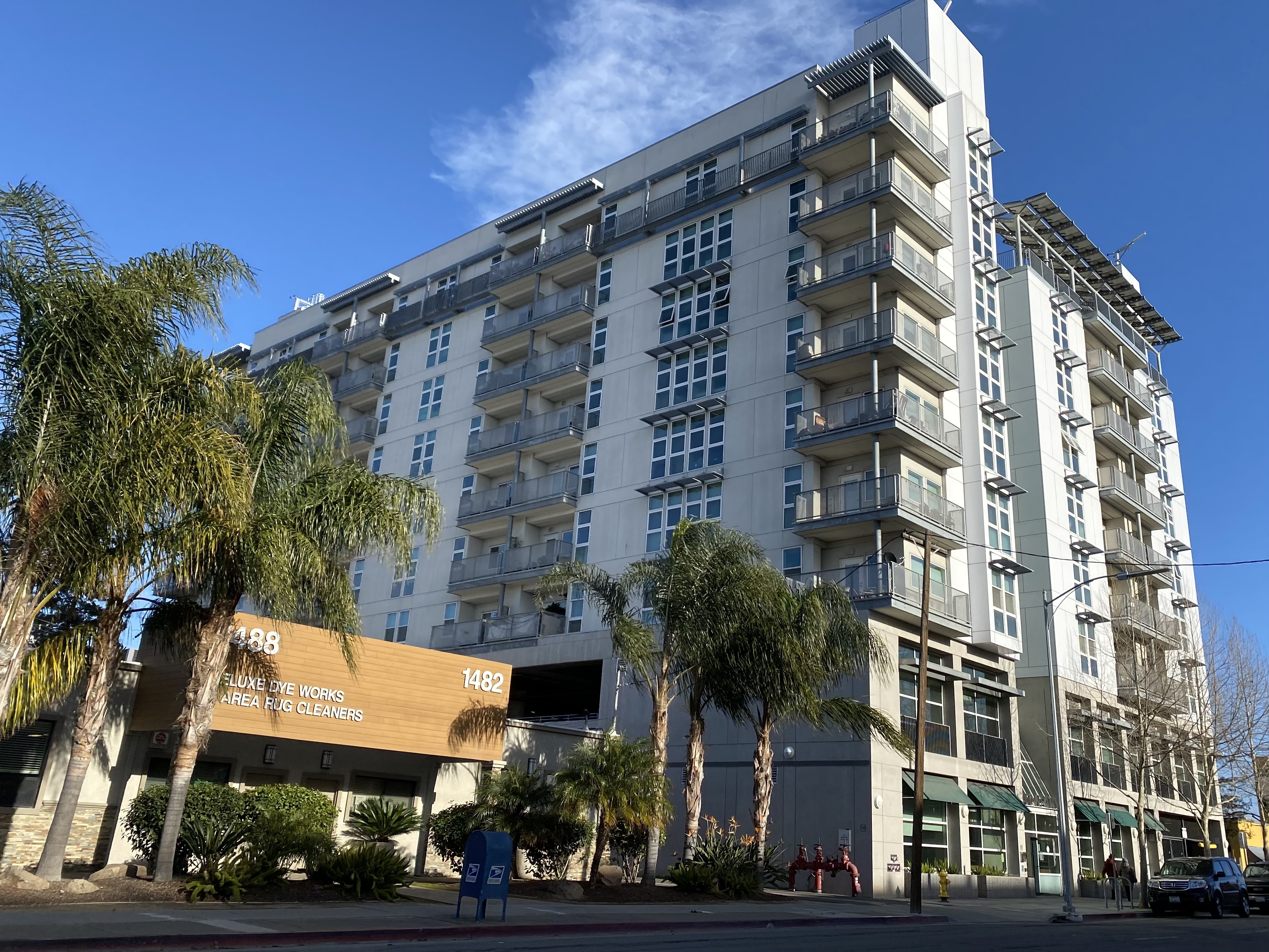
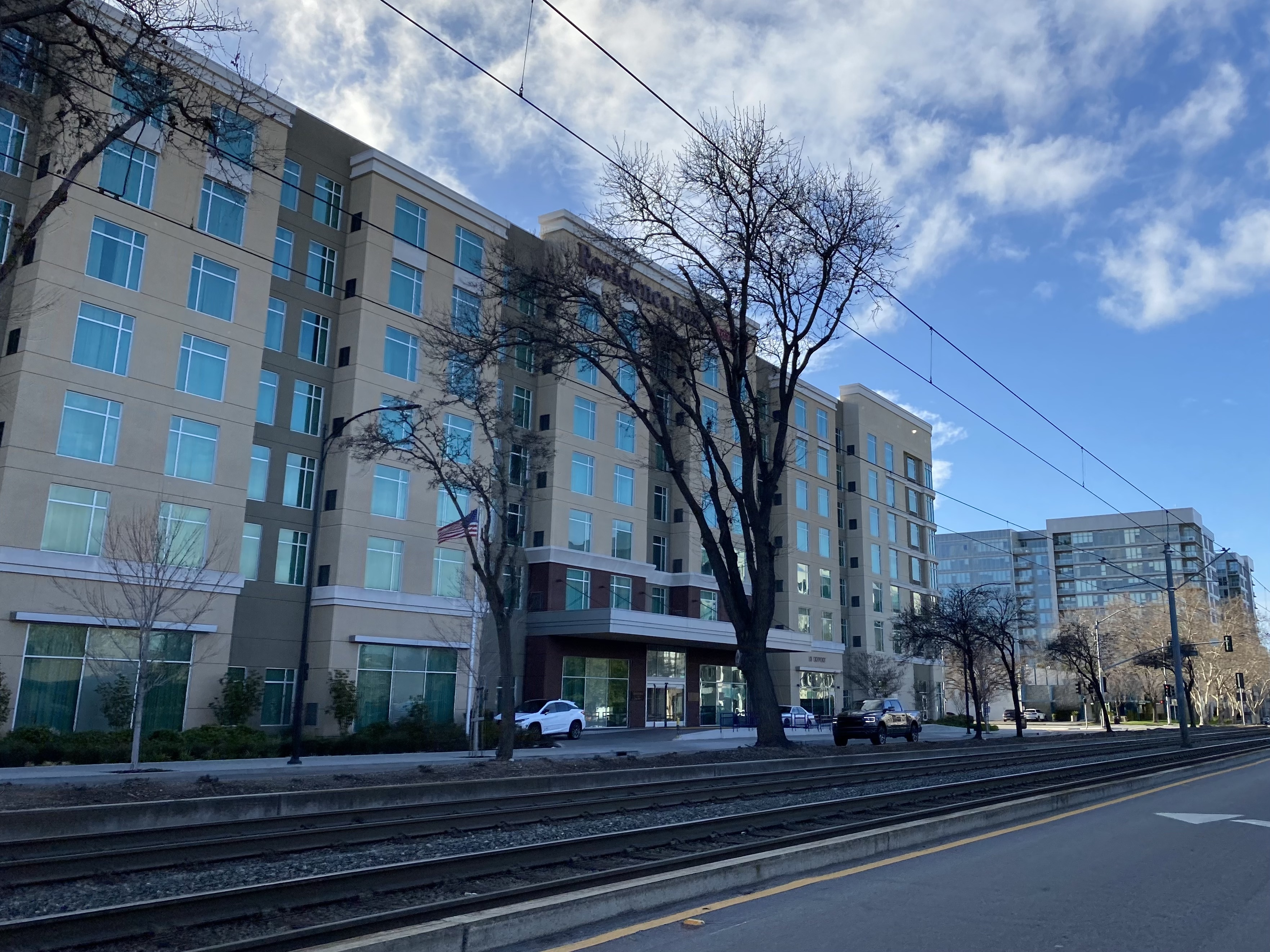

- Location within San Jose
- Coordinates: 37.367067°N 121.913803°W
- Country: United States
- State: California
- City: San Jose

Rincon South is a neighborhood of San Jose, California, located in North San Jose. Rincon South is a major employment hub for Silicon Valley businesses, and is home to numerous high tech companies.

== History ==
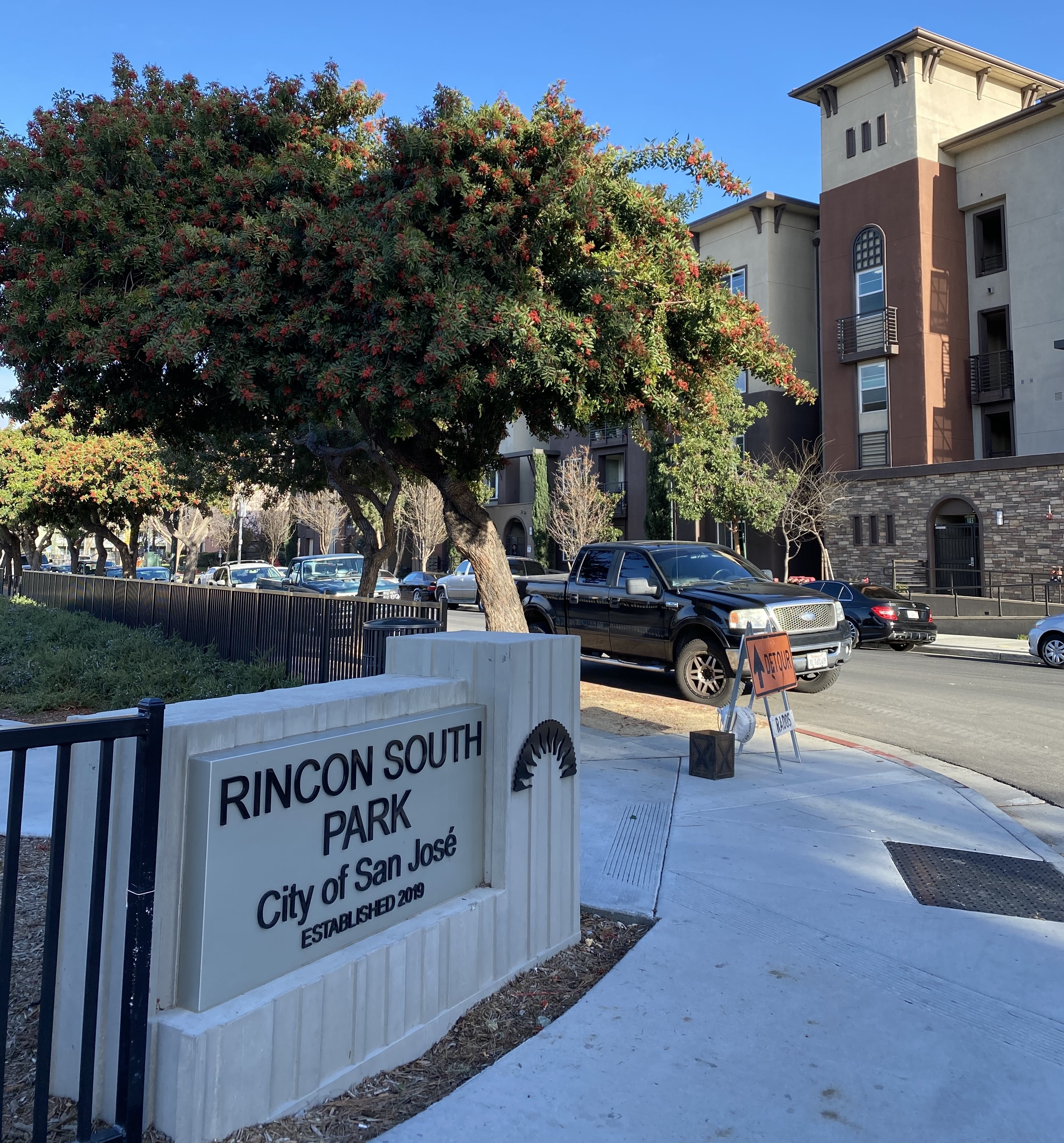
Rincon South Park.

The area takes its name from being the southernmost portion of the old Rancho Rincón de Los Esteros, a rancho grant given in 1838 to Ignacio Alviso, a prominent Californio ranchero and namesake of the Alviso neighborhood of San Jose. The majority of the former rancho makes up the Rincon de los Esteros district of North San Jose, which lies directly north of Rincon South.

In 1974, the government of San Jose instituted the Rincon de los Esteros Redevelopment Plan, to develop the Rincon de los Esteros district and Rincon South into major hubs for Silicon Valley. In 1998, the city established the Rincon South Specific Plan to create a specialized strategy for developing the neighborhood into a dense mixed-use district, improving pedestrian accessibility and transit connections, and attracting tech companies to the area.

In 2020, due to the ongoing California housing crisis and the COVID-19 pandemic, the city purchased a motel within the neighborhood to convert to a transitional housing facility for the homeless.

== Geography ==
Rincon South is located in the North San Jose region of the city. Its boundaries are the Guadalupe Freeway (CA 87) to the west, Bayshore Freeway (US 101) to the east, and the Nimitz Freeway (I-880) to the south.

== Economy ==
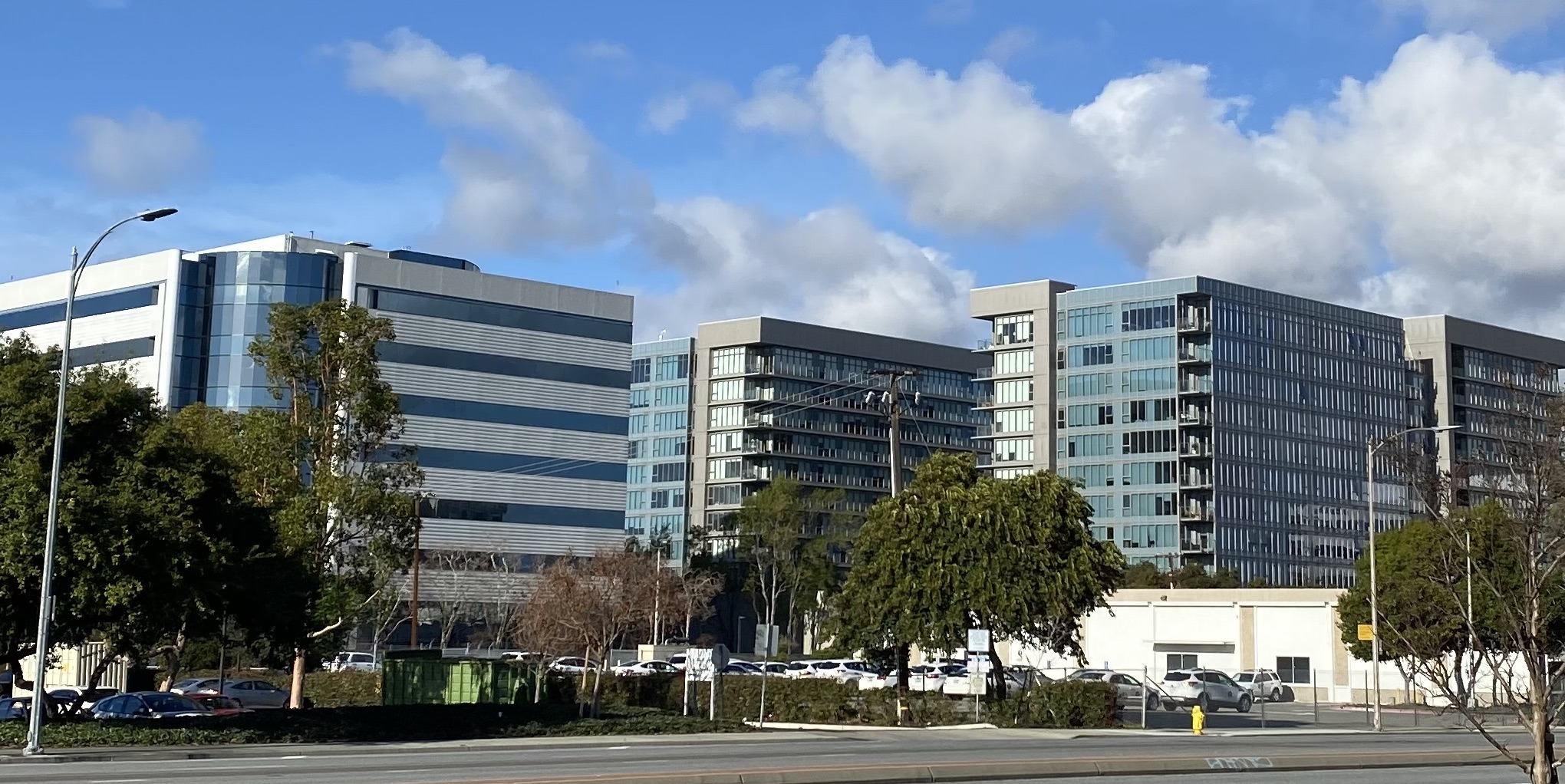
View eastwards from Skyport Dr.

Rincon South is an important economic hub for Silicon Valley. Notable companies based in the neighborhood include:

- Nutanix (headquarters)
- Qualcomm (Silicon Valley offices)
- FICO (headquarters)
- Sony Electronics (Silicon Valley offices)
- Semiconductor Manufacturing International Corporation (American headquarters)
- Eargo (headquarters)
- GlobalLogic (headquarters)
- NEC (American headquarters)

== Transportation ==
Rincon South is one of the best served neighborhoods in San Jose in terms of transportation. San Jose International Airport is located immediately west of Rincon South. It is primarily accessed through the neighborhood.

The VTA light rail has two stations in Rincon South:

- Gish station
- Metro/Airport station

The neighborhood has easy access to Guadalupe Freeway (CA-87), Highway 101, and the Nimitz Freeway (I-880).

== Parks and plazas ==
- Rincon South Park
- Rosemary Gardens Park
