= Rancho Cholame =

Land grant in California

Coordinates: 35.790°N 120.330°W

Rancho Cholame was a 26,622-acre (107.74 km^{2}) Mexican land grant in present-day Monterey County and San Luis Obispo County, California given in 1844 by Governor Manuel Micheltorena to Mauricio Gonzales. The grant extended along the Cholame Valley, and encompassed present day Cholame.

== History ==
Mauricio Gonzales, son of Rafael Gonzales grantee of Rancho San Miguelito de Trinidad, was granted the six square league Rancho Cholame from the secularized holdings of Mission San Miguel Arcángel in 1844, but it was soon abandoned due to Indian raids.

Charles White (1823–1853), a native of Ireland who came overland from Missouri in 1846 with his wife, Ellen E. White, and two children, was one of San Jose's leading and wealthiest citizens in the half-dozen years before and after statehood. He was alcalde of the Pueblo of San José in 1848. White also owned a part of Rancho Rincon de Los Esteros and Rancho Pala. Charles White was killed in the explosion of the steamboat "Jenny Lind" en route from Alviso to San Francisco on April 11, 1853.

With the cession of California to the United States following the Mexican-American War, the 1848 Treaty of Guadalupe Hidalgo provided that the land grants would be honored. As required by the Land Act of 1851, a claim for Rancho Cholame was filed with the Public Land Commission in 1852, and the grant was patented to Ellen E. White in 1865.

In 1867 William Welles Hollister (1818–1886) purchased the Rancho Cholame. Hollister sold a half interest in the rancho to Robert Edgar Jack in 1869 . In 1893, Jack purchased the remaining interest from Hollister’s widow. The Jack family operated Rancho Cholame until the Hearst Corporation purchased it in 1965. It continues to be owned by Hearst Ranch.

== See also ==
- Ranchos of California
- List of Ranchos of California
