= Rancho Pala =

Mexican land grant in California

Coordinates: 37.360°N 121.800°W

Rancho Pala was a 4,454-acre (18.02 km^{2}) Mexican land grant in present day Santa Clara County, California given in 1835 by Governor José Castro to José Joaquín Higuera. The origin of the name is the subject of debate. The word "pala" translates as "shovel" in Spanish, but means "water", in many native American dialects. The grant was a narrow strip of land east of San Jose, and extending southward along the foothills from Penitencia Creek to Norwood Avenue.

== History ==
The one square league Rancho Pala was granted to José Joaquín Higuera, and was acquired by Charles White.

Charles White (Abt. 1808–1853), a native of County Kilkenny, Ireland who came overland from St. Joseph, Missouri in 1846 with his wife, Ellen E. Kearney White (Abt. 1814-1887), and two children, was one of San Jose's leading and wealthiest citizens in the half-dozen years before and after statehood. He was alcalde of the Pueblo of San José in 1848. White also owned a part of Rancho Rincon de Los Esteros and Rancho Cholame. Charles White was killed in the explosion of the steamboat "Jenny Lind" en route from Alviso to San Francisco on April 11, 1853.

With the cession of California to the United States following the Mexican-American War, the 1848 Treaty of Guadalupe Hidalgo provided that the land grants would be honored. As required by the Land Act of 1851, a claim for Rancho Pala was filed with the Public Land Commission in 1853, and the grant was patented to Ellen White, widow and heirs of Charles White in 1866. A claim for Rancho Pala filed by José Joaquín Higuera with the Land Commission in 1853 was rejected.

Ellen White remarried but at the time of her death in 1887, she was separated from attorney Charles E. Allen. Her estate was left to a son, Charles E. White, a rancher and an attorney, and a daughter, Mary Elizabeth Staples who married Frank X. Staples in 1881. Two other children had died previously.
