= Tasman station =

VTA light rail station in San Jose, California

Tasman
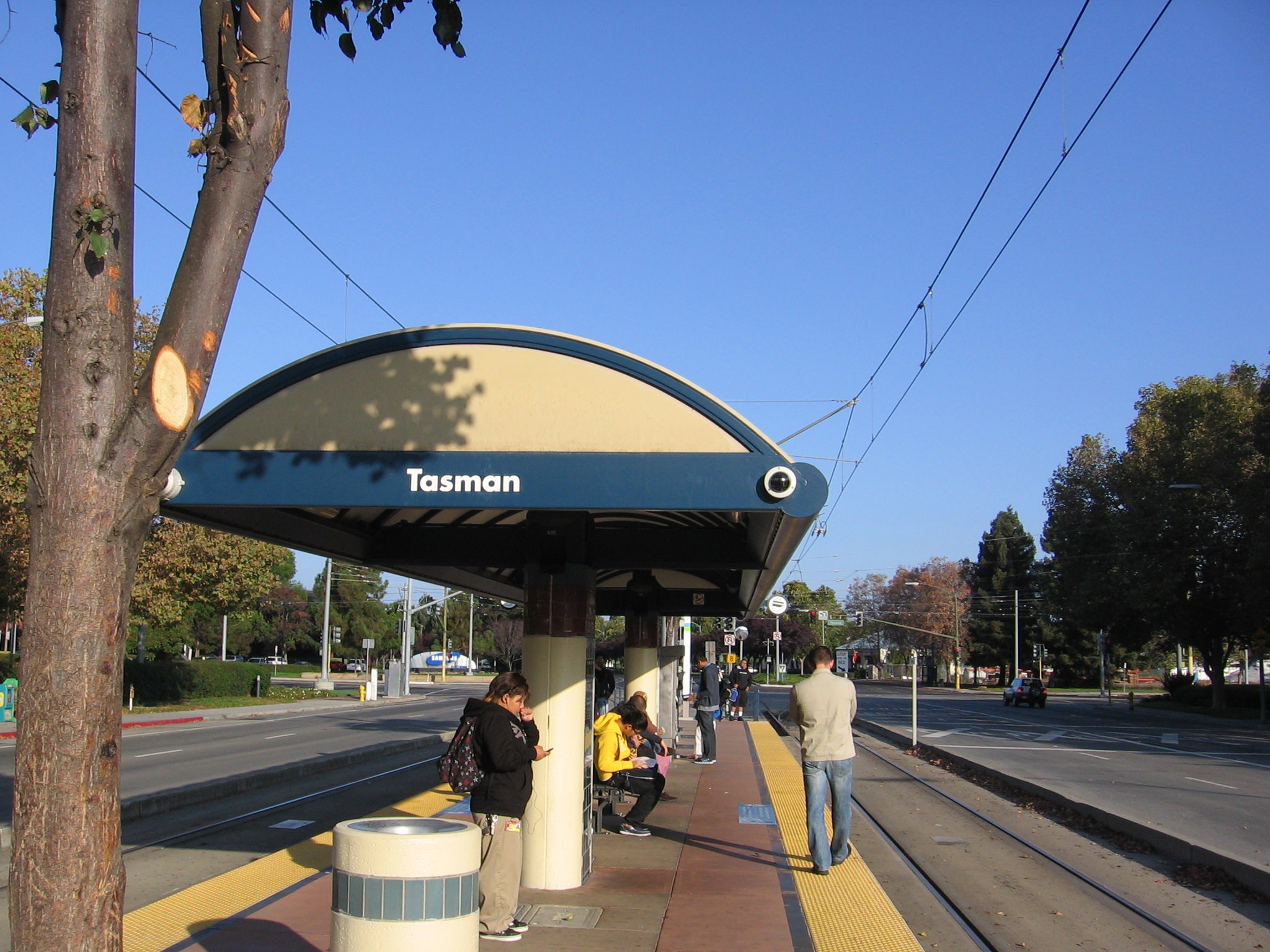
- Tasman station platform

General information
- Location: 1st Street and Tasman Drive; San Jose, California
- Coordinates: 37°24′30″N 121°56′39″W
- Owner: Santa Clara Valley Transportation Authority
- Line: Guadalupe Phase 1
- Platforms: 1 island platform
- Tracks: 2
- Connections: VTA Bus: 59; ACE Shuttle: Brown, Purple

Construction
- Structure type: At-grade
- Accessible: Yes

History
- Opened: December 11, 1987; 38 years ago

Services
Preceding station	VTA	Following station
Baypointe Terminus	Blue Line	River Oaks toward Santa Teresa
Champion toward Old Ironsides	Green Line	River Oaks toward Winchester
Location

Tasman station is an at-grade light rail station located in the center median of First Street at its intersection with Tasman Drive, after which the station is named, in San Jose, California. The station is owned by Santa Clara Valley Transportation Authority (VTA) and is served by the Blue Line and the Green Line of the VTA light rail system. This is the northernmost station served by both the Blue and Green lines and serves as one of the primary transfer points between the two lines.
