= Ignacio Alviso =

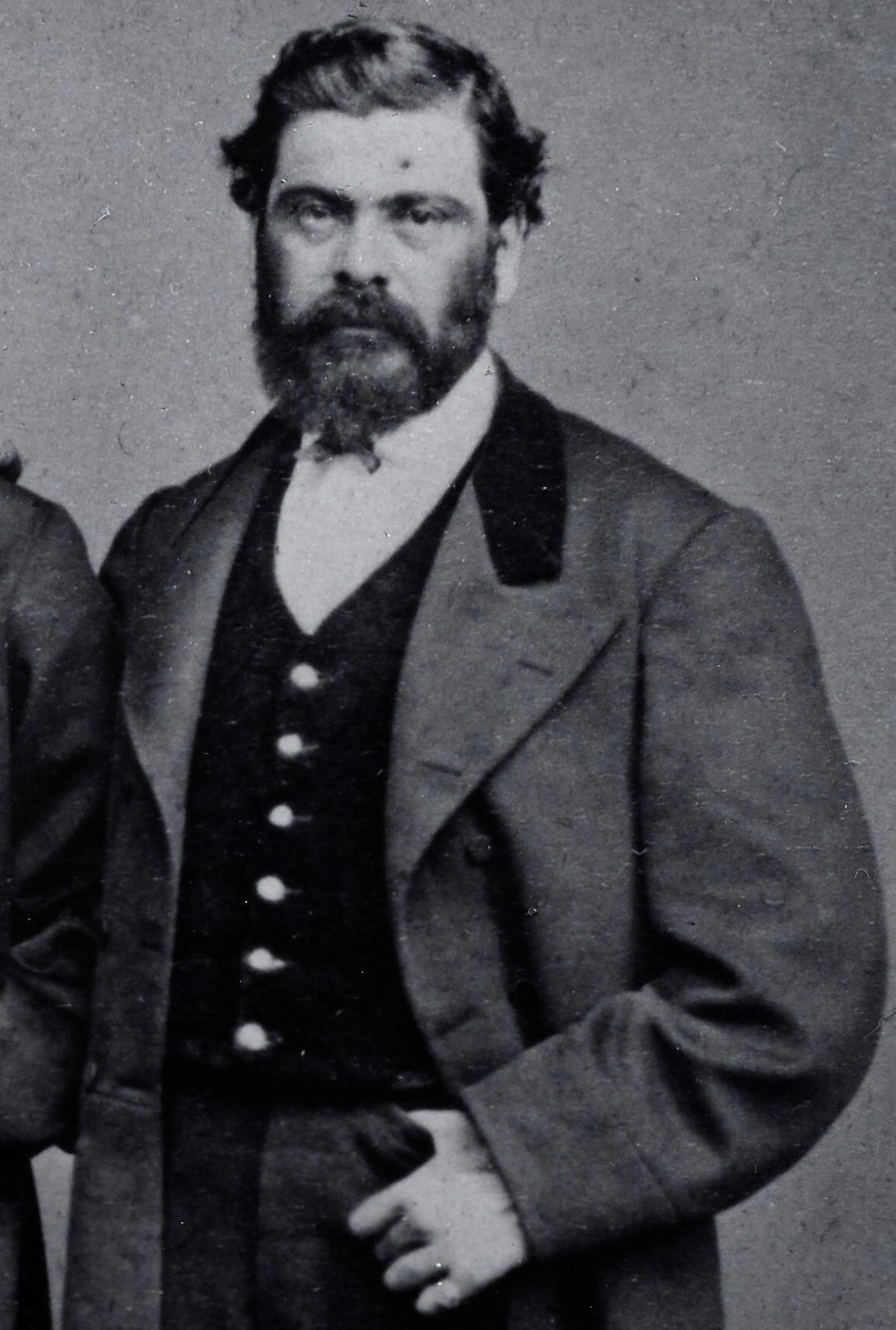
- Born: 1772; San Miguel de Horcasitas
- Died: 1848 (aged 75–76); Alviso, California
- Occupations: Ranchero, soldier
- Spouse: Maria Margarita Bernal

Juan Ignacio Alviso (1772–1848) was a Californio ranchero and soldier. He is the namesake of Alviso, a neighborhood of the city of San Jose, California.

== Biography ==
Born in San Miguel de Horcasitas in what is now the Mexican state of Sonora, three-year-old Ignacio left with his parents Corporal Domingo Alviso (1738–1777) and Maria Angela Trejo (1742–1803), brothers and sister in 1775 on the de Anza Expedition to San Francisco. His father died a year following their arrival. Ignacio served as a soldier in the San Francisco Company from 1805 to 1819.

He married Maria Margarita Bernal (1781–1828).

In 1838 he was granted Rancho Rincón de Los Esteros.

He died in 1848 leaving a large estate.

Ignacio Alviso is the uncle of José María Alviso, an early alcalde of San Jose. He is also the grandfather of Valentine Alviso, who was a member of the California State Assembly (14th District) from 1881 to 1883.

== See also ==
- Californios
- History of California through 1899
