= River Oaks station =

VTA light rail station in San Jose, California

River Oaks
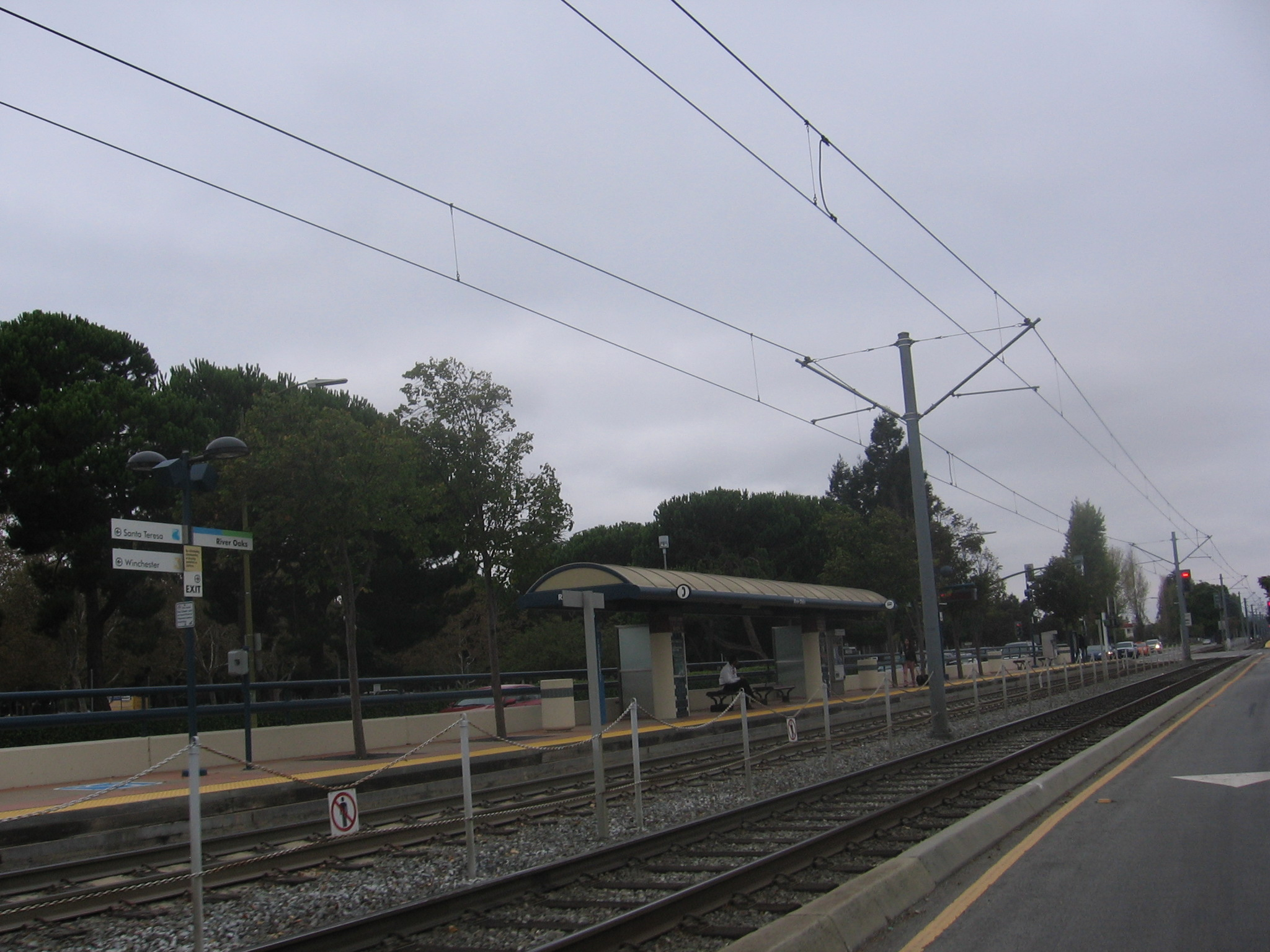
- River Oaks station, 2012

General information
- Location: 1st Street and River Oaks Parkway; San Jose, California
- Coordinates: 37°24′08″N 121°56′23″W
- Owner: Santa Clara Valley Transportation Authority
- Line: Guadalupe Phase 1
- Platforms: 2 side platforms
- Tracks: 2
- Connections: ACE Shuttle: Brown

Construction
- Structure type: At-grade
- Parking: 22 spaces
- Cycle facilities: Racks and lockers
- Accessible: Yes

History
- Opened: December 11, 1987; 38 years ago

Services
Preceding station	VTA	Following station
Tasman toward Baypointe	Blue Line	Orchard toward Santa Teresa
Tasman toward Old Ironsides	Green Line	Orchard toward Winchester
Location

River Oaks station is an at-grade light rail station located in the center median of First Street at its intersection with River Oaks Parkway, after which the station is named, in San Jose, California. The station is owned by Santa Clara Valley Transportation Authority (VTA) and is served by the Blue Line and the Green Line of the VTA light rail system.

== Services ==
=== Location ===
The station is located in San Jose, California in the center median of 1st Street at River Oaks Parkway. The stop serves its immediate San Jose neighborhood, which includes VTA's administration office, as well as a nearby portion of Santa Clara opposite the Guadalupe River, accessible via a bicycle-pedestrian bridge. The bridge makes River Oaks one of VTA's few North San Jose light rail stops to serve a residential neighborhood, as North San Jose is almost entirely industrial.

It is within walking distance of River Oaks Park.
