= Guadalupe River Trail =

Recreational trail in San Jose, California

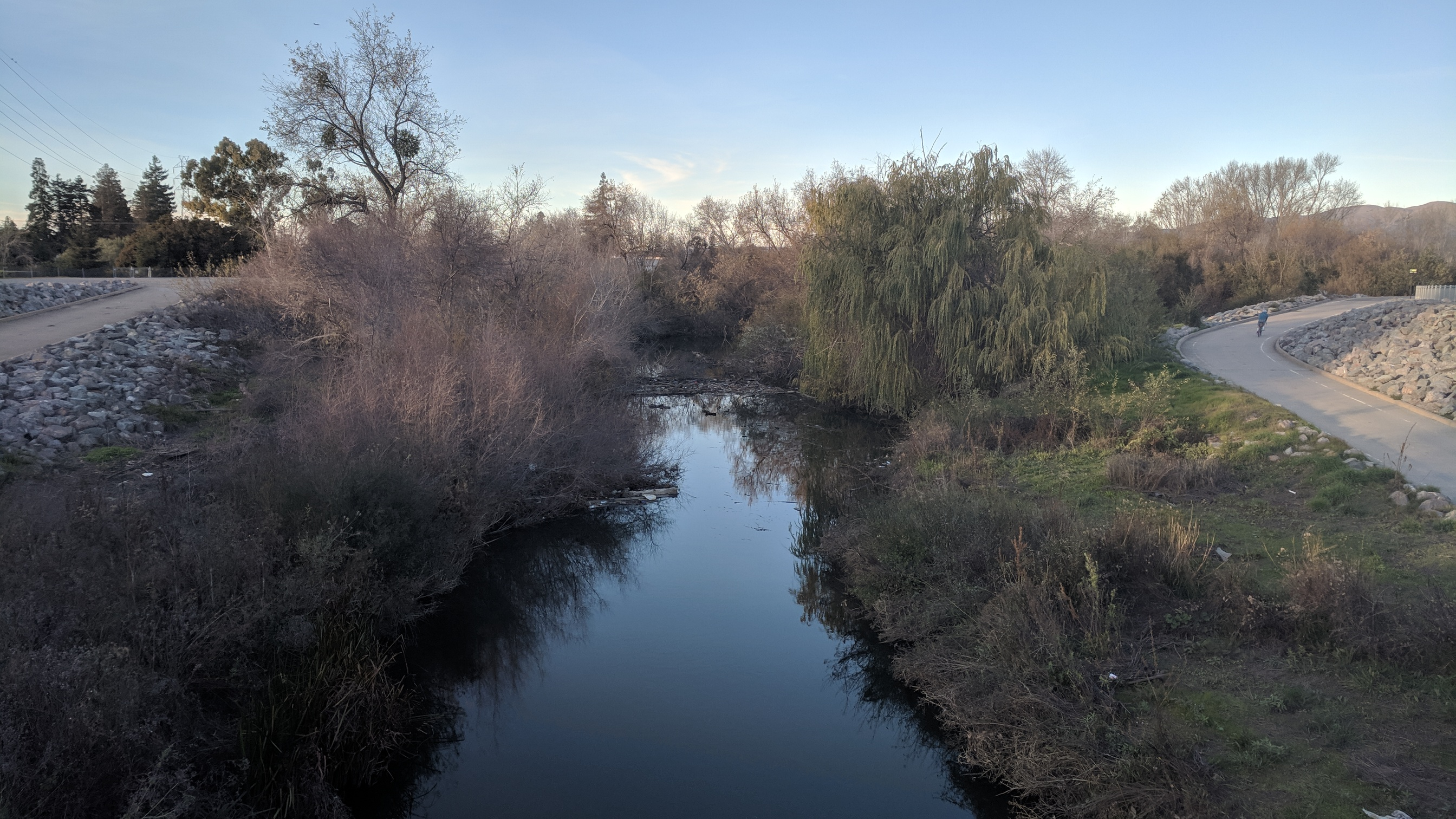
Guadalupe River, with trail on right, looking north from near Trimble Road, San Jose

The Guadalupe River Trail is an 11-mile (18 km) pedestrian and bicycle path in the city of San Jose, California. The path runs along the banks of the Guadalupe River. The trail is currently composed of two discontinuous segments: a shorter "upper" segment in the Almaden Valley neighborhood of San Jose and a longer "lower" segment through Downtown San Jose to Alviso. This trail is heavily used for both recreation and commuting, as it provides direct access to Downtown San Jose from many of the outlying neighborhoods. The trail is paved.

The trail is a part of a fabric of trails that connects the southern Almaden Valley with the Bay Trail with Class 1 bike trails with only two short street sections.

The Guadalupe River Trail was designated part of the National Recreation Trail system in 2009.

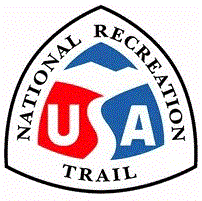
National Recreation Trail

== Upper Guadalupe River Trail ==
The trail's shorter, 2.4 mile upper (southern, upstream) segment is from Almaden Lake Park to Chynoweth Avenue—a distance of 1.4 miles (2.3 km). It is discontinuous with the rest of the trail.

The southern terminus is adjacent to Almaden Lake Park at Coleman Road in the Almaden Valley neighborhood. It runs along the river northward, with an undercrossing beneath Blossom Hill Road. It then passes very close to Westfield Oakridge Mall. It then passes beneath the highway flyovers of State Route 85 and ends at Chynoweth Avenue near William H. Cilker Park.

== Lower Guadalupe River Trail ==
=== Southern terminus ===
The trail's longer, 9.0 mile lower (northern, downstream) segment starts just south of Interstate 280 around West Virginia Street, just east of SR87. The trail on the western bank of the river starts from West Virginia Street. The trail on the eastern bank of the river starts from Palm Street, just north of West Virginia Street.

=== Through Downtown San Jose ===
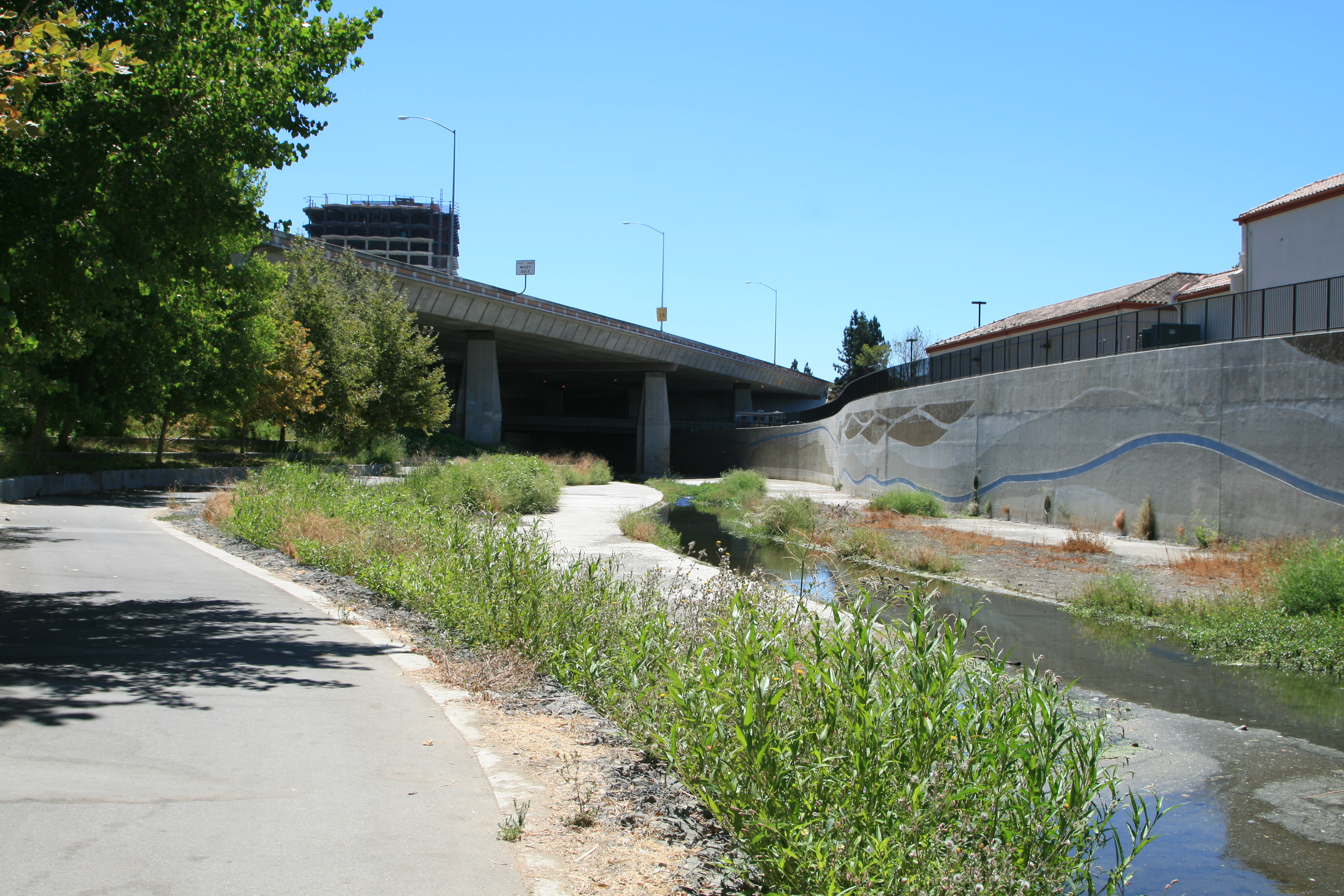
Guadalupe River Trail follows the river under Highway 87

The trail then follows the river northward beneath Woz Way and then north to where a trail bridge across the river exists at Discovery Meadow. The western trail passes under both West San Carlos Street and Park Avenue before terminating on the north side of Park Avenue. The eastern trail has surface crossings of West San Carlos Street and Park Avenue before passing by John P. McEnery Park and a surface crossing of San Fernando Street. It then passes under Santa Clara Street, through the Guadalupe River Park and Gardens, and through Arena Green East, which is directly across the river from the SAP Center. Further north, there are roadway crossings at St. John Street and Julian Street.

At Julian Street, the trail starts again on both sides of the river. The western trail has a road-level crossing of the railroad tracks, and the eastern trail passes beneath them. The trail continues northward, crossing under Coleman Avenue, Taylor Street, Hedding Street, and Interstate 880.

=== Airport to northern terminus ===
The trail continues along the border of Mineta San Jose International Airport, crosses beneath Skyport Drive. At Airport Parkway, the eastern path has no direct path and no crosswalk. Instead, the path is directed across the bridge to the western path, under the bridge, and then back across the bridge.The western path continues under the bridge.

It then passes under the airport green lot access bridge, U.S. Route 101, Trimble Drive, and Montague Expressway. A dedicated trail bridge across the river is next at the western end of River Oaks Parkway. The trail passes alongside the Ulistac Natural Area. The trail then passes under Tasman Drive. It then connects with the Highway 237 Bikeway before passing under State Route 237. This is the newest segment of the trail, which was officially opened on April 20, 2013.

The trail's northern terminus is at Gold Street in the Alviso neighborhood.

== Connection between the two segments ==
The Highway 87 Bikeway provides a connection between the two segments of the Guadalupe River Trail.From the northern terminus of the upper (southern) segment, go east on Chynoweth Avenue, cross to the north side of the street at Pearl Avenue, cross under Highway 87 and enter the Highway 87 Bikeway.

From the northern terminus of the Highway 87 Bikeway at Willow Street, immediately cross Willow Street. Cross under the railroad tracks and turn north on Mclellan Avenue. Turn east on Edwards Avenue, then north on Harliss Avenue. Turn west on West Virginia Ave.After a short distance the entrance to the western bank trail of the lower (northern) segment of the Guadalupe River Trail will be on the north side of the street. The entrance to the eastern bank trail is on Palm Street, just to the north of West Virginia Avenue.

== Connections to the trail ==
=== Connection to the Lake Almaden Trail and the Los Alamitos Creek Trail ===
At the northwest corner of lake Almaden, the trail connects to the Lake Almaden Trail, which encircles the lake. Just south of the lake, that trail connects to the Los Alamitos Creek Trail that connects to the southern Almaden Valley.

=== Connection to the southern segment of the Los Gatos Creek Trail and Willow Glen ===
The southern segment of the Los Gatos Creek Trail, which leads to Campbell and Los Gatos, can be reached from the southern terminus of the lower Guadalupe River Trail by turning west on West Virginia Street, then south on Delmas Avenue, and then west onto the on-street bike lane on Willow Avenue, which passes through downtown Willow Glen.

=== Connection to the Coyote Creek Trail and northbound Bay Trail ===
The trail connects to the Coyote Creek Trail via the bike lane on River Oaks Parkway. There is an entrance to that trail just south of Camille Circle. An alternate connection is via Cisco Way and then onto the trail behind building 15. Further north, the Coyote Creek Trail connects to the northbound portion of the Bay Trail.

=== Connection to the Highway 237 Bikeway ===
The trail connects to the Highway 237 Bikeway. This connection also provides a bridge between the trails on each side of the river.

=== Connection to the Alviso Slough Trail portion of the Bay Trail ===
The trail connects to the Alviso Slough Trail portion of the San Francisco Bay Trail from the northern terminus by turning north on Gold Avenue, west on Elizabeth Street, and then north on Hope Street. The Alviso Slough Trail is a segment of the region-wide Bay Trail.

=== Connection to the westbound Bay Trail ===
The trail connects to the westbound direction of the San Francisco Bay Trail via going west on the Highway 237 Bikeway, turning north on Lafayette Street, and then entering the trail just south of the Gold Street Connector.

=== Connection to the San Tomas Aquino Creek Trail ===
The trail connects to the San Tomas Aquino Creek Trail from the Bay Trail as above and then travels west about 1/2 mile.

=== Connection from the Southern Almaden Valley to the Bay Trail ===
The Guadalupe River Trail is a part of a fabric of trails that connects the southern Almaden Valley with the Bay Trail with Class 1 bike trails with only two short street sections. This path starts on the Los Alamitos Creek Trail and continues north on the Lake Almaden Trail, then the Upper Guadalupe River Trail, then a short street connection as detailed above, then the Highway 87 Trail, then another short street connection as detailed above, then the Lower Guadalupe River Trail, and finally connects to the Bay Trail as detailed above.
