= North San Jose =

- Region of San Jose, California
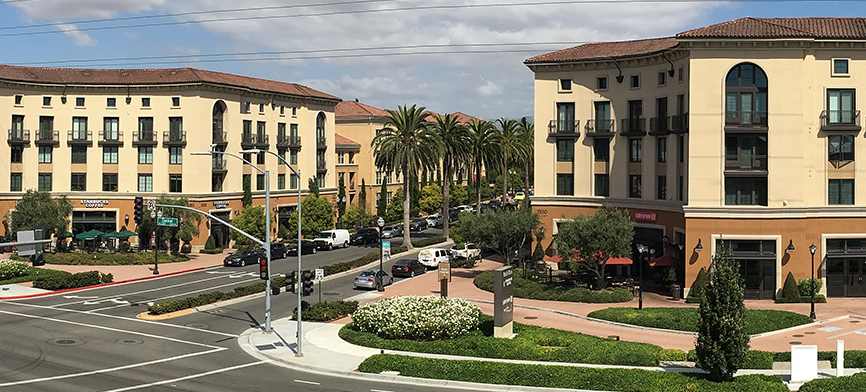
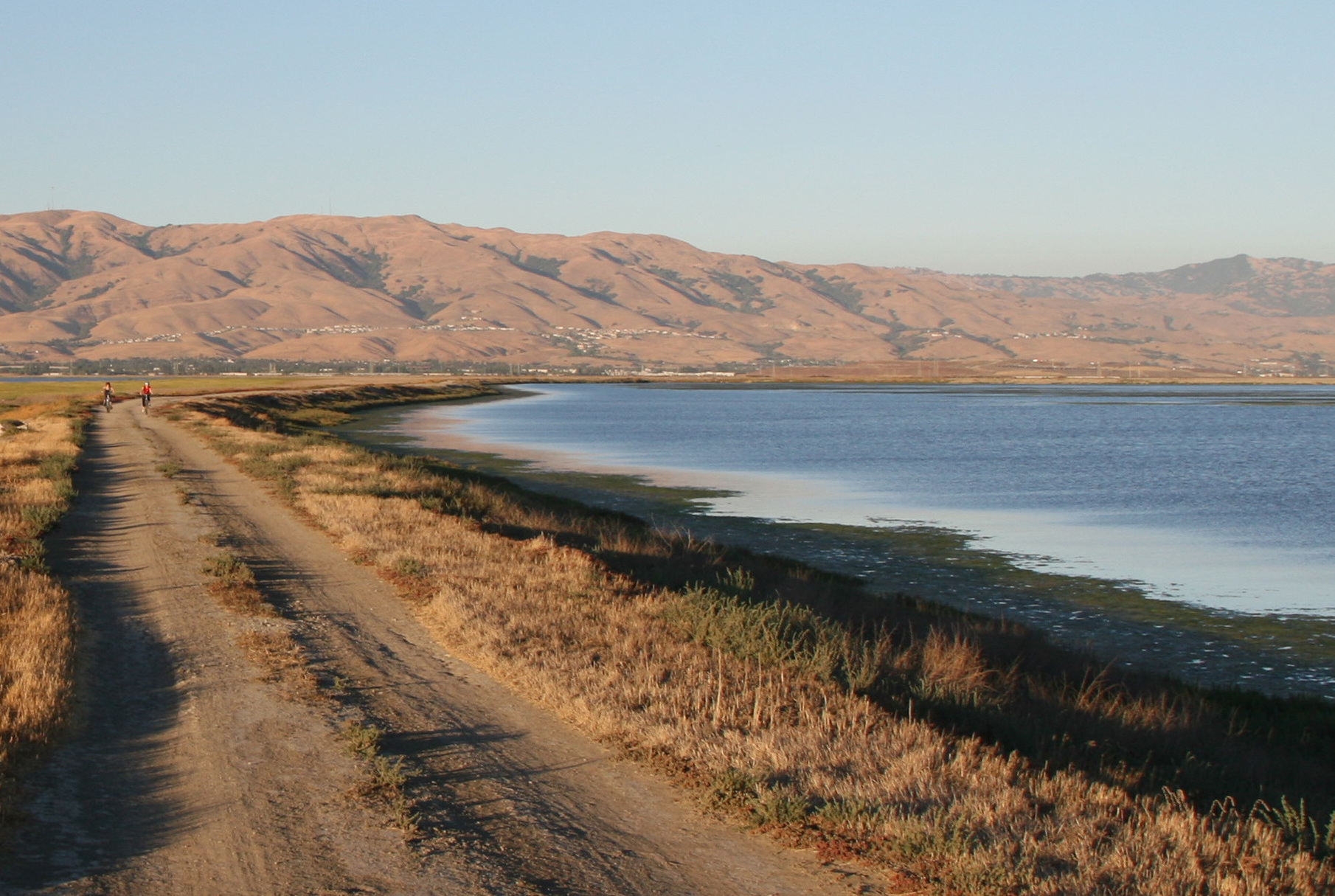
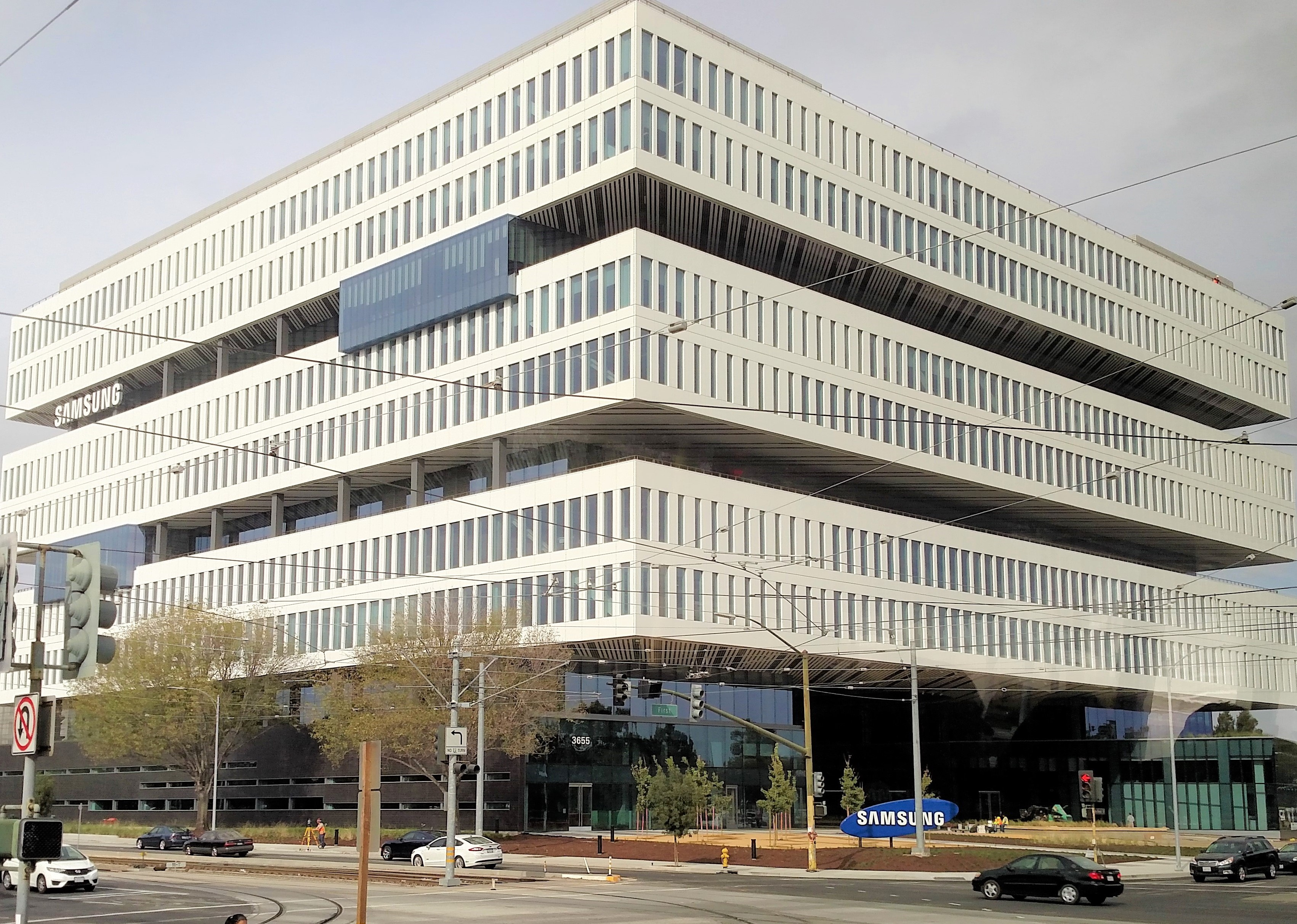
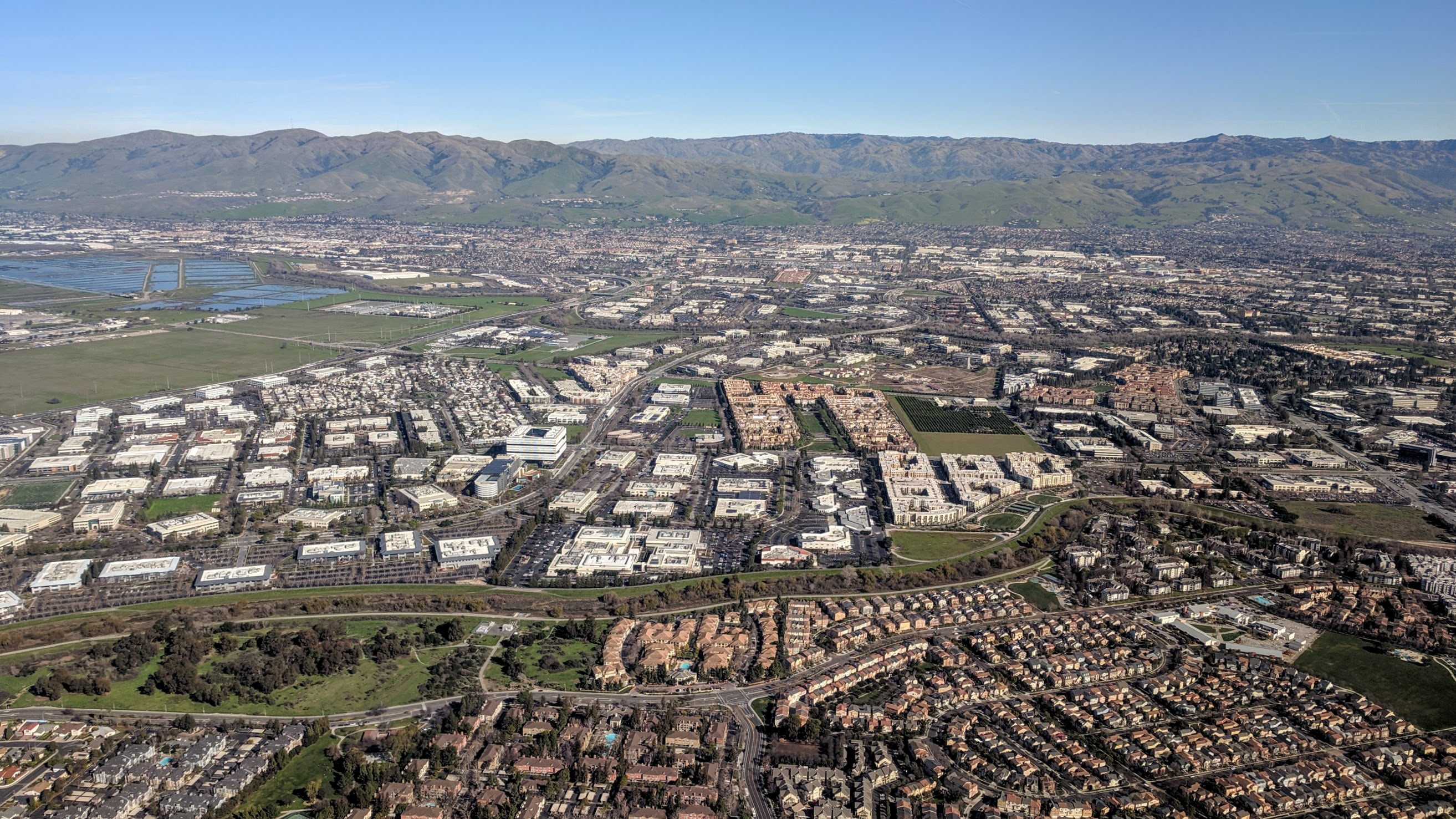
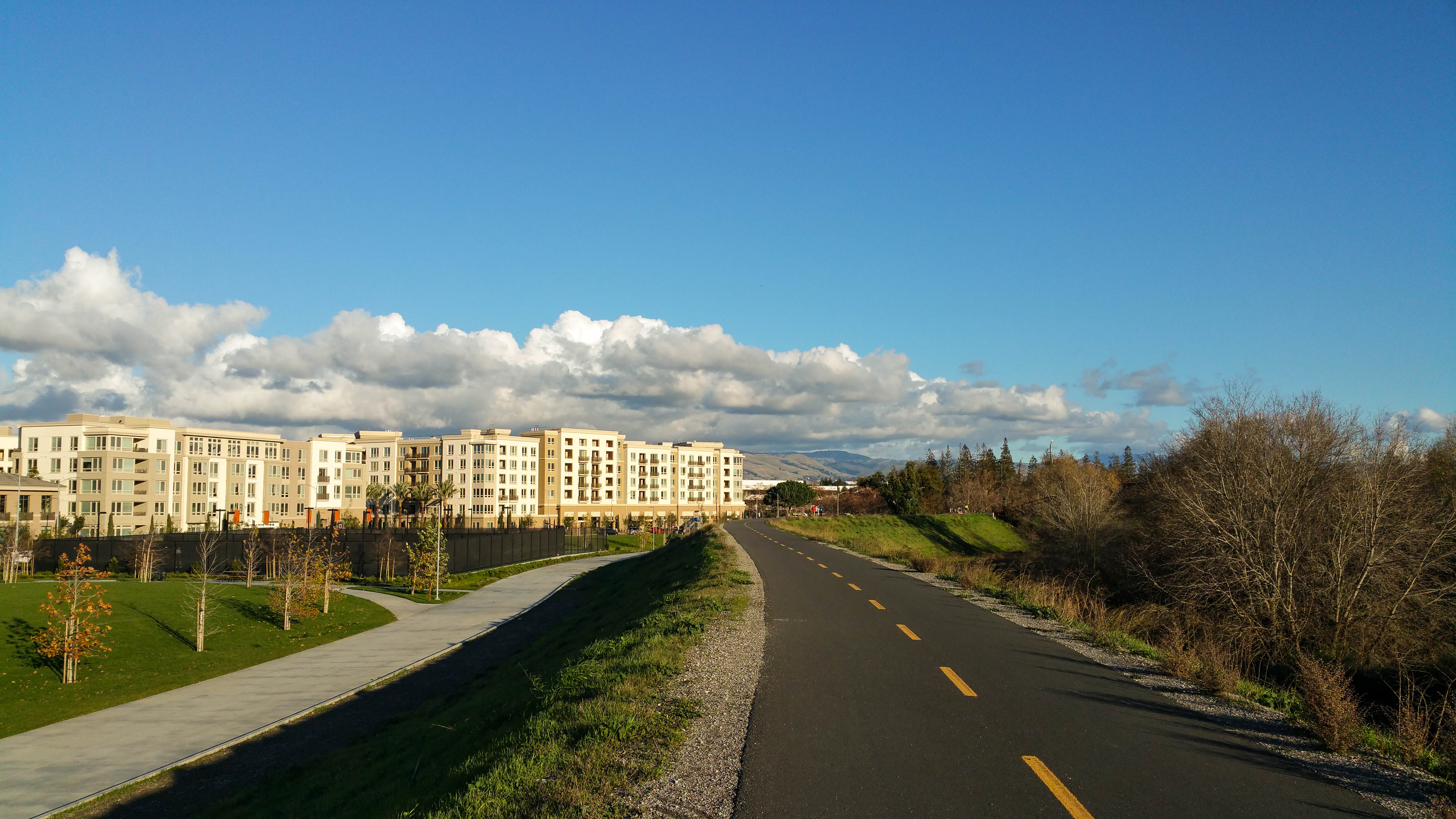
- Clockwise: North San Jose Innovation District; Samsung HQ; Guadalupe River Trail; aerial view of North San Jose; San Francisco Bay in Alviso.

- Location within San Jose
- Coordinates: 37.388752°N 121.927753°W
- Country: United States
- State: California
- County: Santa Clara
- City: San Jose

North San José (NSJ) is a region of San Jose, California located north of the city's urban core. The area is the subject of the city's North San José planning and development policies and includes portions of the communities of Alviso, Berryessa, and Rincon de los Esteros.

North San José is bounded by the southern shore of San Francisco Bay and the city of Milpitas to the north. The area includes major employment, industrial, residential, and commercial districts and is one of San José's principal growth areas.

== Districts and neighborhoods ==
Areas commonly associated with North San José include:

- Alviso
- Berryessa
- Rincon de los Esteros
- Rincon South

== Economy ==
North San José is one of the principal employment centers in San Jose, California. Development in the area is guided by the North San José Area Development Policy, which was adopted in 2005 and later incorporated into the city's Envision San José 2040 General Plan.

The area contains a large concentration of office, research and development, industrial, and technology-related employment. City planning documents identify North San José as a major growth area for both jobs and housing, with development policies intended to balance new residential construction with employment-generating land uses.

Planning documents for North San José envision substantial future employment growth and commercial development. The area has been described as a major employment district within Silicon Valley and one of San José's primary locations for future job creation.

== Transportation ==
North San José is served by several major transportation corridors, including U.S. Route 101, Interstate 880, and California State Route 237. These highways provide regional connections to the rest of Silicon Valley, the East Bay, and the San Francisco Peninsula.

Public transportation in North San José is provided primarily by the Santa Clara Valley Transportation Authority (VTA). The area is served by VTA Light Rail, including stations along the North First Street and Tasman corridors, which connect North San José with Downtown San José, Milpitas, Mountain View, and other parts of Santa Clara County.

In 2026, the City of San José adopted the Connect North San José plan, which identified transportation improvements intended to enhance transit access, bicycle and pedestrian connectivity, and mobility throughout one of the city's largest employment centers.
