= Rancho Ulistac =

Mexican land grant in California

Coordinates: 37.40°N 121.970°W

Rancho Ulistac was a 2,217-acre (8.97 km^{2}) Mexican land grant in present-day Santa Clara County, California, given in 1845 by Governor Pío Pico to Marcello and Cristobal, Indians. The grant extended across lowlands reaching from the Alviso shoreline southward and encompassing the land between the Guadalupe River and Saratoga Creek, and the town of Agnew.

== History ==
In 1846, Governor Pico granted one-half square league to Santa Clara Mission Indian Marcello and his nephews Pio and Cristobal.

Jacob David Hoppe (1813–1853), was born in Maryland and came to California in 1846. He established a newspaper, which later became the "Alta California". He was elected a delegate to the 1849 California Constitutional Convention. After the discovery of gold, he went to the mines, where he remained a few months with some profit, and returned to San Jose, where he became the first American Postmaster. Hoppe acquired Rancho Ulistac from the original Indian grantees. Hoppe was killed in the explosion of the SS Jenny Lind en route from Alviso to San Francisco on April 11, 1853.

With the cession of California to the United States following the Mexican–American War, the 1848 Treaty of Guadalupe Hidalgo provided that the land grants would be honored. As required by the Land Act of 1851, a claim for Rancho Ulistac was filed with the Public Land Commission in 1852, and the grant was patented to heirs of Jacob D. Hoppe in 1868.

The Hoppe heirs sold the land in 1860. In 1885, 1,650 acres (6.7 km^{2}) of Rancho Ulistac were developed as a site of the Agnews Developmental Center. The hospital was destroyed in the 1906 San Francisco earthquake, leaving 125 dead, but was quickly rebuilt.

The name "Ulistac" derives from the language of the Ohlone people who once inhabited the area. Uli is believed to be the name of an Ohlone chief, and the suffix -tac means "place", so that "Ulistac" likely meant "Uli's place". However, other sources define it to mean "at Ulis". In 1916, linguist A. L. Kroeber wrote that, while -tac is a Tamyen suffix meaning "place of", the rest of the name is unidentifiable.

== Historic sites of the Rancho ==
- James Lick Mansion – a large house built by James Lick around 1858

== Ulistac Natural Area ==
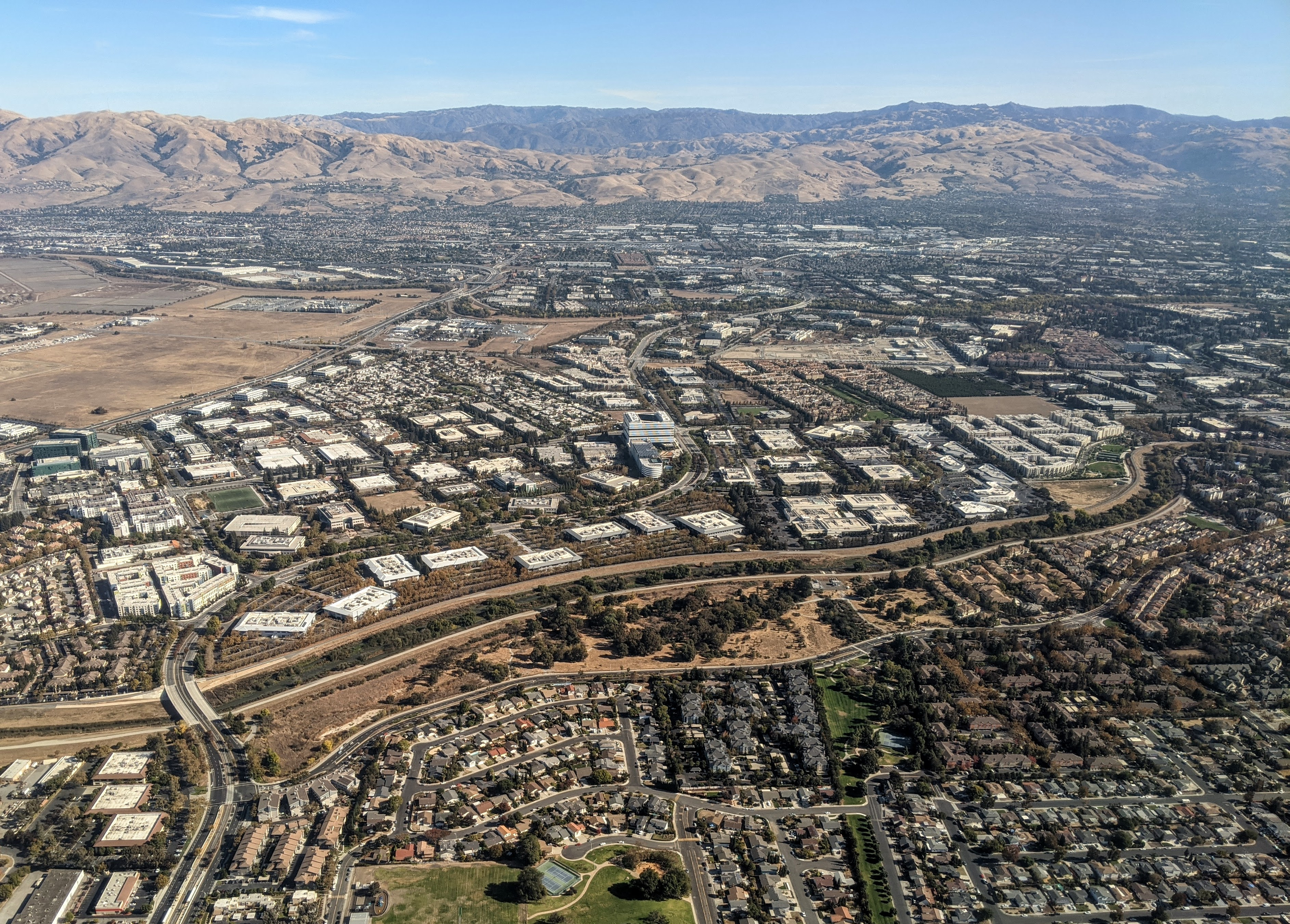
Aerial view of Ulistac Natural Area, along the near side of the Guadalupe River

The Ulistac Natural Area is a 40-acre volunteer-maintained natural area within the original rancho, between Lick Mill Blvd. and the Guadalupe River, showcasing seven distinctive natural habitats.
