= Jacob David Hoppe =

American journalist

Jacob David Hoppe (c. 1813 — 1853) was a 19th-century Californian newspaperman and politician.

Jacob Hoppe was born in Maryland and came to California in 1846. He established a newspaper, which later became The Daily Alta California. He was elected a delegate to the 1849 California Constitutional Convention. After the discovery of gold, he went to the mines, where he remained a few months with some profit, then returned to San Jose, where he became the first postmaster. He was a signatory to the first California Constitution. Hoppe acquired Rancho Ulistac from its original Indian grantees. Hoppe was killed in the explosion of the SS Jenny Lind en route from Alviso to San Francisco on April 11, 1853.
