= Thomas Chew =

Thomas Chew may refer to:

- Thomas Edward Manley Chew (1874–1928), lumber merchant and political figure in Ontario, Canada
- Thomas Foon Chew (1889–1932), Chinese American businessman
