= James Lick Mansion =

Historic house in California, United States

- James Lick Mill
- U.S. National Register of Historic Places
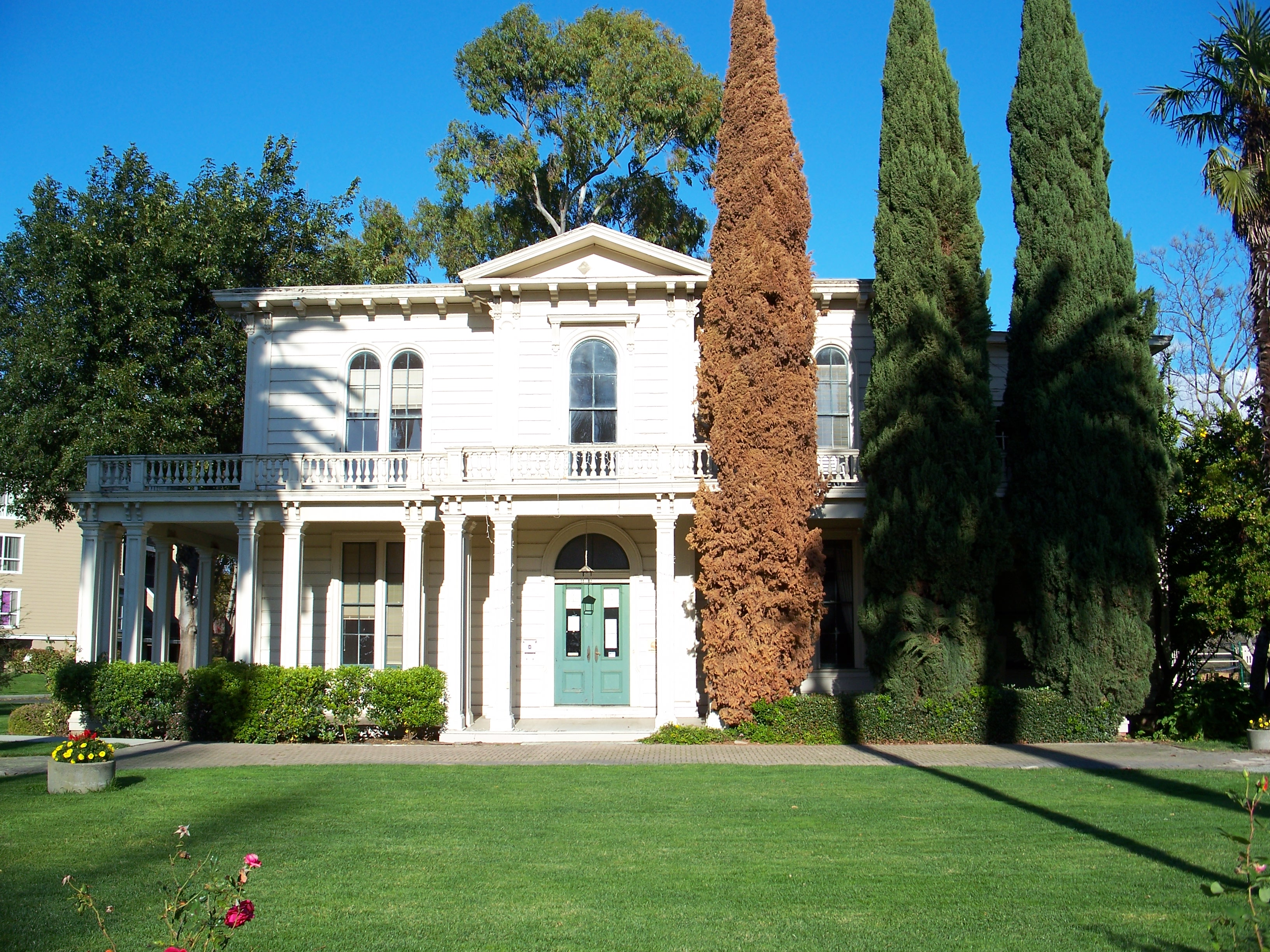
- Location: Santa Clara, California
- Coordinates: 37°23′58.91″N 121°56′34.87″W
- Built: 1858-1860
- Architectural style: Italianate—Victorian
- NRHP reference No.: 82002272
- Added to NRHP: March 2, 1982

The James Lick Mansion, in Santa Clara, California, United States, is the estate of James Lick, who was the richest man in California at the time of his death in 1876. The estate is listed on the National Register of Historic Places. This property was once part of the Rancho Ulistac land grant, a square league reaching from the Alviso shoreline southward and encompassing all the land between the Guadalupe River and Saratoga Creek.

== History ==
=== Lick era ===
The complex of buildings reflects the varied uses of the property over its history. The major historical constructions are a brick granary and millpond from the original mill built by James Lick around 1855, the large house built by Lick around 1858 and a late Victorian-era office building.

Lick built this Italianate Victorian mansion between 1858 and 1860 next to his flour mill. The mansion is constructed of native redwood featuring detailed woodwork and imported marble fireplaces in each of its 24 rooms.

His farm background helped him realize the potential of the site for agricultural production. Around the mansion and mill, Lick developed a highly successful orchard operation and pioneered the introduction of new fruits and horticultural techniques. Imported specimens include the large cork oaks on the property planted by Lick himself and are still standing presently at the Mansion Grove property.

=== Later ===
An 1882 fire destroyed the mill and in 1902 the Lick Mill complex was converted to the manufacture of alcohol. A series of owners, including Union Distilling, Western Grain and Sugar Products, Western Carbonic Gas, American Salt and Chemical, and Commercial Solvents and Chemical, manufactured a wide variety of products at this location.

=== Present day ===
The Lick Mansion and grounds are located at 4101 Lick Mill Blvd., Santa Clara, on the grounds of the Mansion Grove Apartment complex. The grounds are now privately owned and closed to the public. The City of Santa Clara disputes this statement – although the property was recently purchased by a private owner, the grounds remain subject to a right of public access to visit this important historic resource.
