= Agnew's Village, California =

Coordinates: 37°23′38″N 121°57′29″W

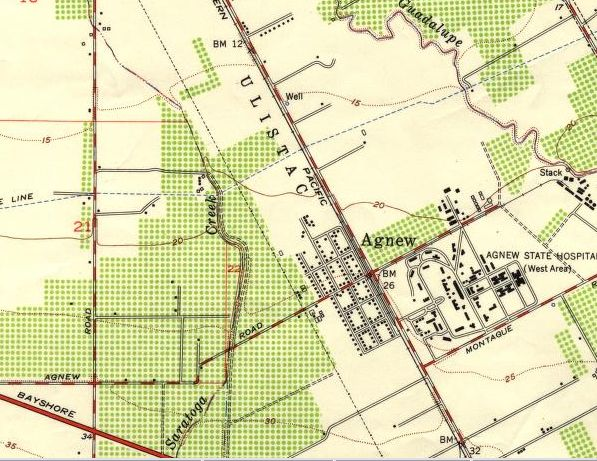
1953 USGS map showing "Agnew", where Agnew Rd. crosses the Southern Pacific railroad track that runs parallel to Lafayette Ave., Santa Clara, California

Agnew's Village (or Agnew) was a small unincorporated village in what is now Santa Clara, California. It was named for Abram Agnew, a Santa Clara Valley pioneer from Ohio who settled there around 1873. Agnew donated 4 acres (1.6 ha) of land for a South Pacific Coast Railroad station and laid out the town, causing the station and town to be referred to as "Agnew's". The railroad depot is still standing.

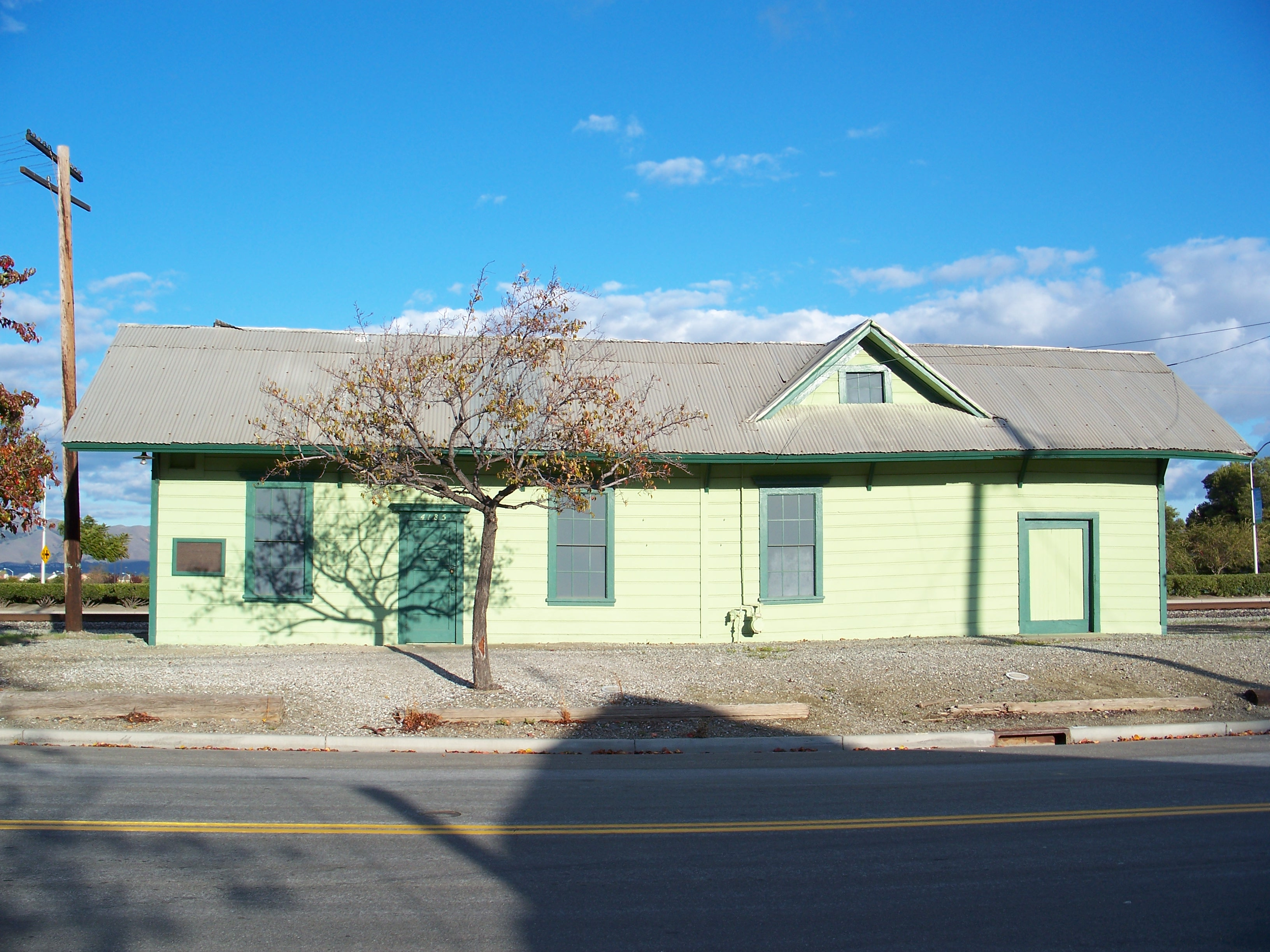
South Pacific Coast Railroad Agnew Depot, in what was once Agnew's Village

Agnew's land appears on 1877 maps, opposite Lick Mill, a paper mill operated by James Lick. Agnew's Village was annexed into Santa Clara in the mid 1980s.

The Agnew name lives on in Agnew Park in Santa Clara, as well as Agnews Developmental Center, the western campus of which was located in Agnew's Village. The campus has since been turned into the Rivermark community and an R&D campus for Oracle Corporation (formerly the headquarters for Sun Microsystems). The latter includes the 14.5-acre (5.9 ha) Agnews Historic Park.

== Notable people ==
- Marv Owen (1906–1991) was a baseball player, manager, coach and scout. Known for his time on the Detroit Tigers.
- Edward J. Livernash (1866–1938) was a newspaperman and lawyer who served one term as a U.S. Representative from California.
