= Steamboat Jenny Lind =

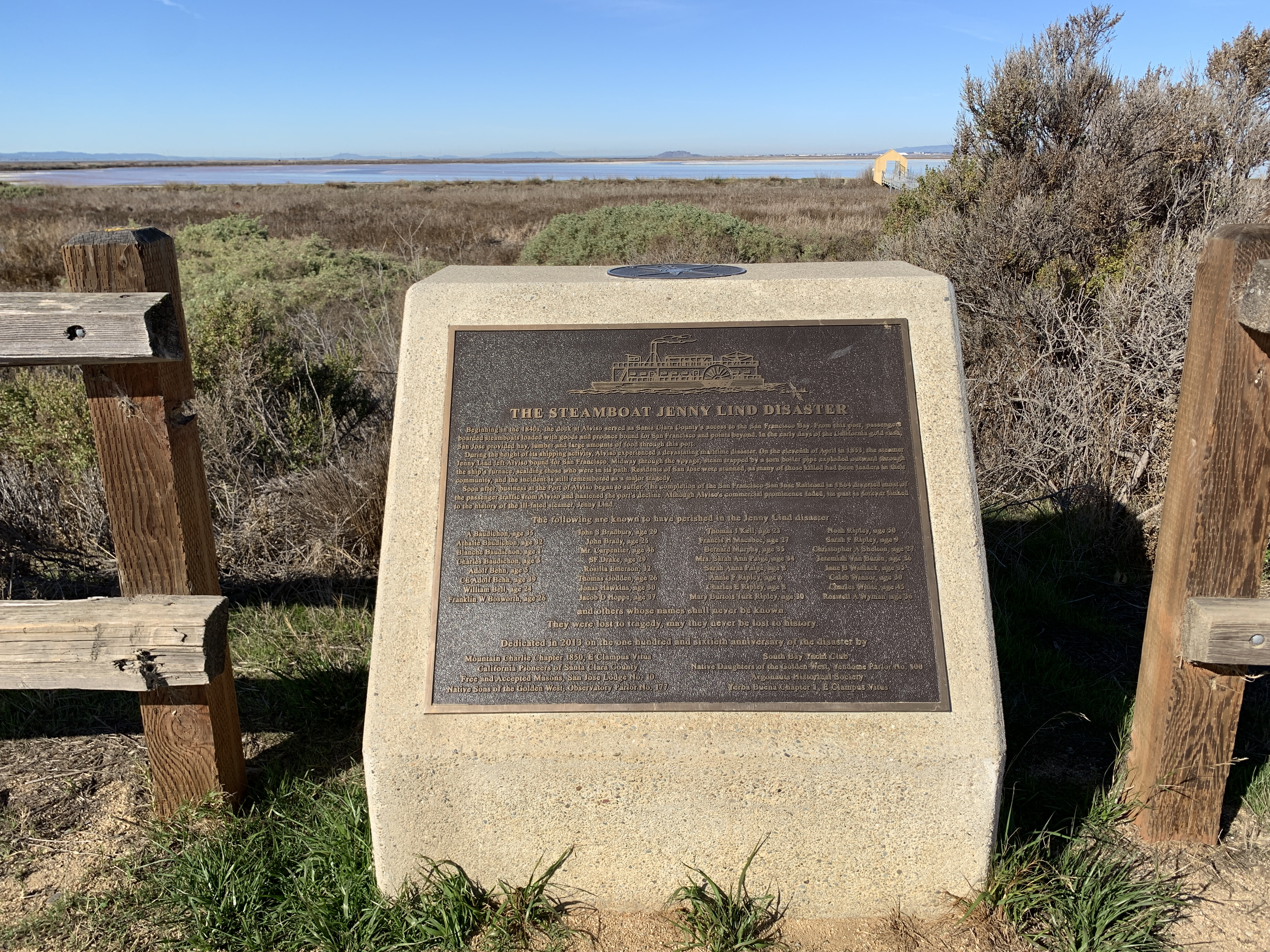
Memorial to Jenny Lind disaster at Alviso Marina County Park

The steamboat Jenny Lind was a ferry that exploded in San Francisco Bay on April 11, 1853 while on course to San Francisco from Alviso, California, killing many residents of Alviso and San Jose. The boiler exploded as the steamboat passed the Redwood City inlet (about 37.54°N 122.18°W), minutes after dinner was called for the passengers. The worst of the casualties were among the women and children who were seated first at dinner. At least 31 people were killed.

== History ==
Built in San Francisco in 1850, the Jenny Lind was named for Swedish opera singer Jenny Lind, made famous in the United States by PT Barnum. The destruction of the Jenny Lind was a major reason for building the San Francisco and San Jose Railroad.

== Victims of the Jenny Lind Explosion ==
- Thomas Godden, land owner in Santa Clara County and second husband of Maria Encarnacion Ortega de Sanchez
- Jacob David Hoppe, contributing founder of The Daily Alta California, signatory of the Constitution of California and first postmaster for San Jose
- Thomas J. Kell (1829–1853), nephew of Bernard Murphy
- Bernard Murphy (1818–1853), the son of Martin Murphy Sr., a pioneer of California and a Santa Clara County land owner
- Noah Ripley, prominent San Francisco resident
- Christopher A. Shelton, botanist who brought first beehive to San Jose.
- Thomas W. White, second mayor of the Pueblo of San Jose.
