= Agnew station =

Coordinates: 37°23′36.71″N 121°57′29.42″W

Agnew
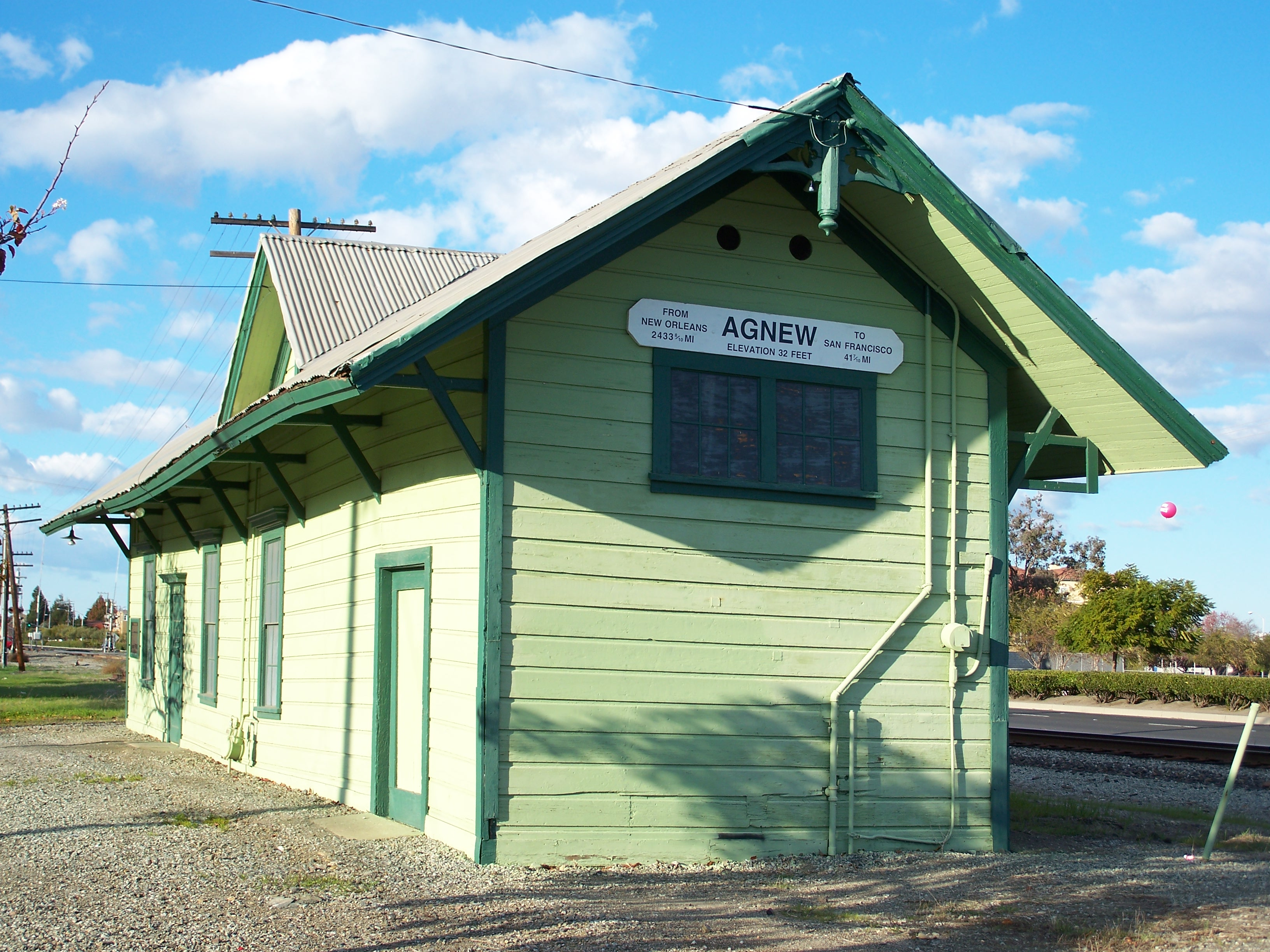
- The former station building in 2007.

History
- Opened: 1877

Former services
Preceding station	Southern Pacific Railroad	Following station
Newark toward Oakland Pier	South Pacific Coast Railroad	Santa Clara toward Santa Cruz
Location

Agnew station is a former railway station in Santa Clara County, California, in what is now the city of Santa Clara. The station was built in 1877 and originally served the narrow-gauge South Pacific Coast Railroad. Landowner Abram Agnew donated 4 acres (1.6 ha) to the railroad to build a station and laid out the settlement that would become known as Agnew's Village. (The station was similarly referred to as Agnew's.) The line and station came under the ownership of the Southern Pacific Railroad in 1887. The station building was purchased by the California Central Model Railroad Club in 1963 after passenger and freight services ceased — the rail line remains active. The building was made a City of Santa Clara Historic Landmark in 1988.
