= Rivermark of Santa Clara =

- Planned community
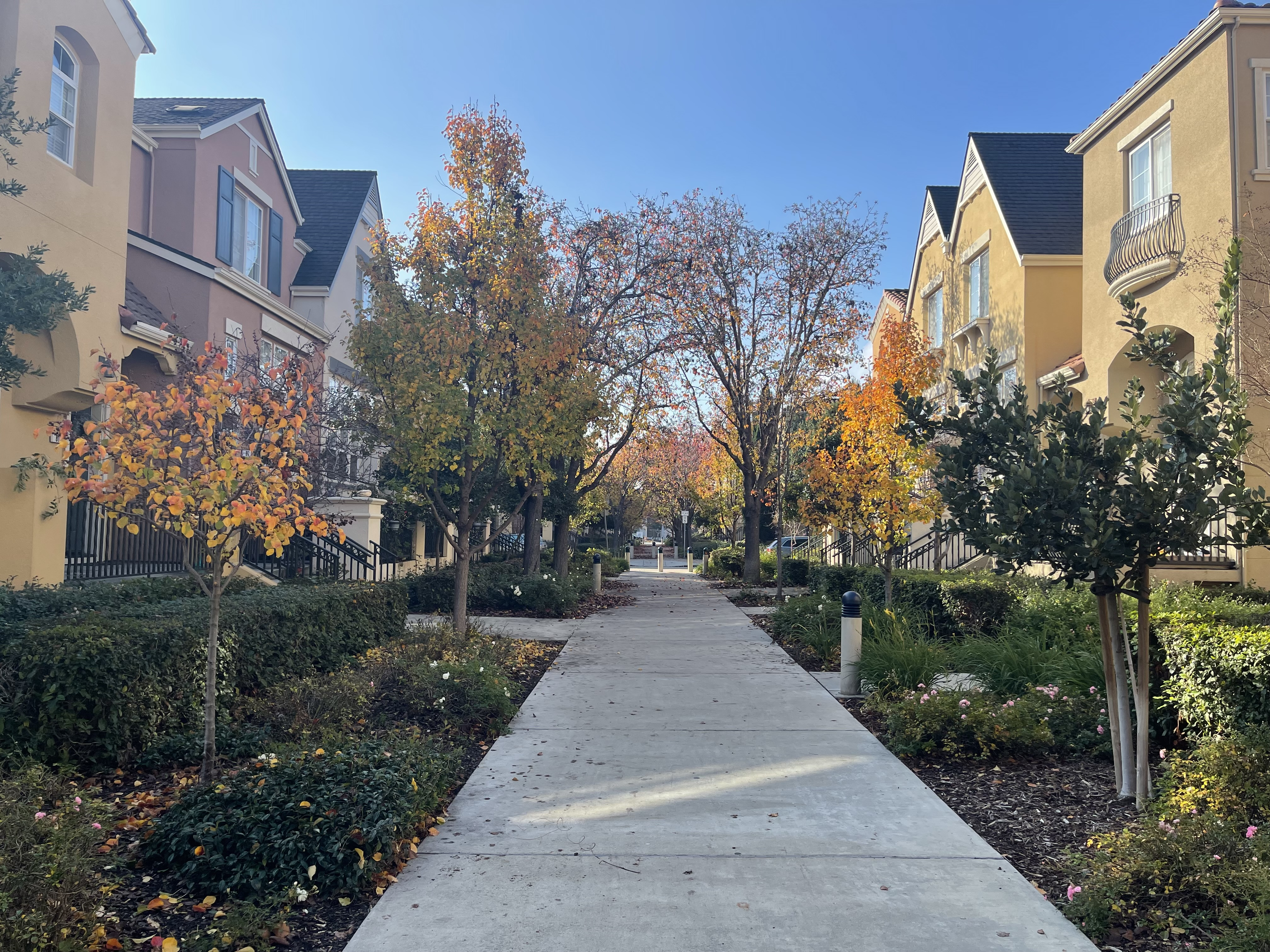
- Townhouses near Agnew Road

- Location within Santa Clara
- Coordinates: 37.395997°N 121.948989°W
- City: Santa Clara
- Zip Code: 95054

Rivermark of Santa Clara is a master-planned community in Santa Clara, California, built on a 152-acre (0.62 km^{2}) parcel formerly owned by the State of California and previously used by Agnews Developmental Center. The community comprises retail space, parks, school, library, apartments, condominiums, townhouses, and houses (detached single-family homes). The Rivermark neighborhood has been described as "upscale," with many young professionals and families as residents.

== Area and composition ==
The area associated with the community is bordered on the south by Montague Expressway, south and west by Agnew Road, west by Lafayette Street, north by Hope Drive, and east by the Guadalupe River. The area includes the Rivermark Village retail center, and the housing developments including The Arbors by Centex, The Park by Centex, The Promenade by Lennar, The Greens by Lennar, The Landings by Shea, The Glen by Shea, and 550 Moreland. The Mansion Grove Apartments (on Lick Mill Boulevard) are not included in Rivermark of Santa Clara.

== History ==
In 1998 the Agnews Developmental Center closed its west campus, on which site Rivermark was later developed. In September, 2000 the City of Santa Clara approved the Rivermark developers’ plans. In 2002 three builders started building new housing developments on land directly bordering the Guadalupe River in Santa Clara, California as part of the Rivermark Master Plan Development.

Since that time, developers have won several national design awards for their contributions to various facets of Rivermark, including Grand Award for Master Planned Project of the Year (2004) and Grand and Merit Award from Builder magazine in 2003.

On March 29, 2009, the neighborhood was the site of the deadliest incident of domestic violence in the city's history. Devan Kalathat shot and killed five members of his immediate and extended family, including three children, and critically injured his wife before turning the gun on himself.

After a controversial and delayed development process, the Northside Library opened on August 9, 2014. Redevelopment agency funding that was used to build the library was challenged by the County of Santa Clara and the State of California. Advocacy on the part of the Santa Clara Library Foundation and Friends, the Rivermark community, and Assemblyman Bob Wieckowski were credited with opening the long-awaited library.

Rivermark represents a significant portion of the Santa Clara's growth since 2000, housing many of the new residents who contributed to the citywide demographic shift from roughly 50% non-Hispanic white to 28% two decades later. As of the 2020 Census, 47% of residents are Asian American.

== See also ==
- Agnew's Village, California
