= Agnews Developmental Center =

- Agnews Insane Asylum
- U.S. National Register of Historic Places
- U.S. Historic district
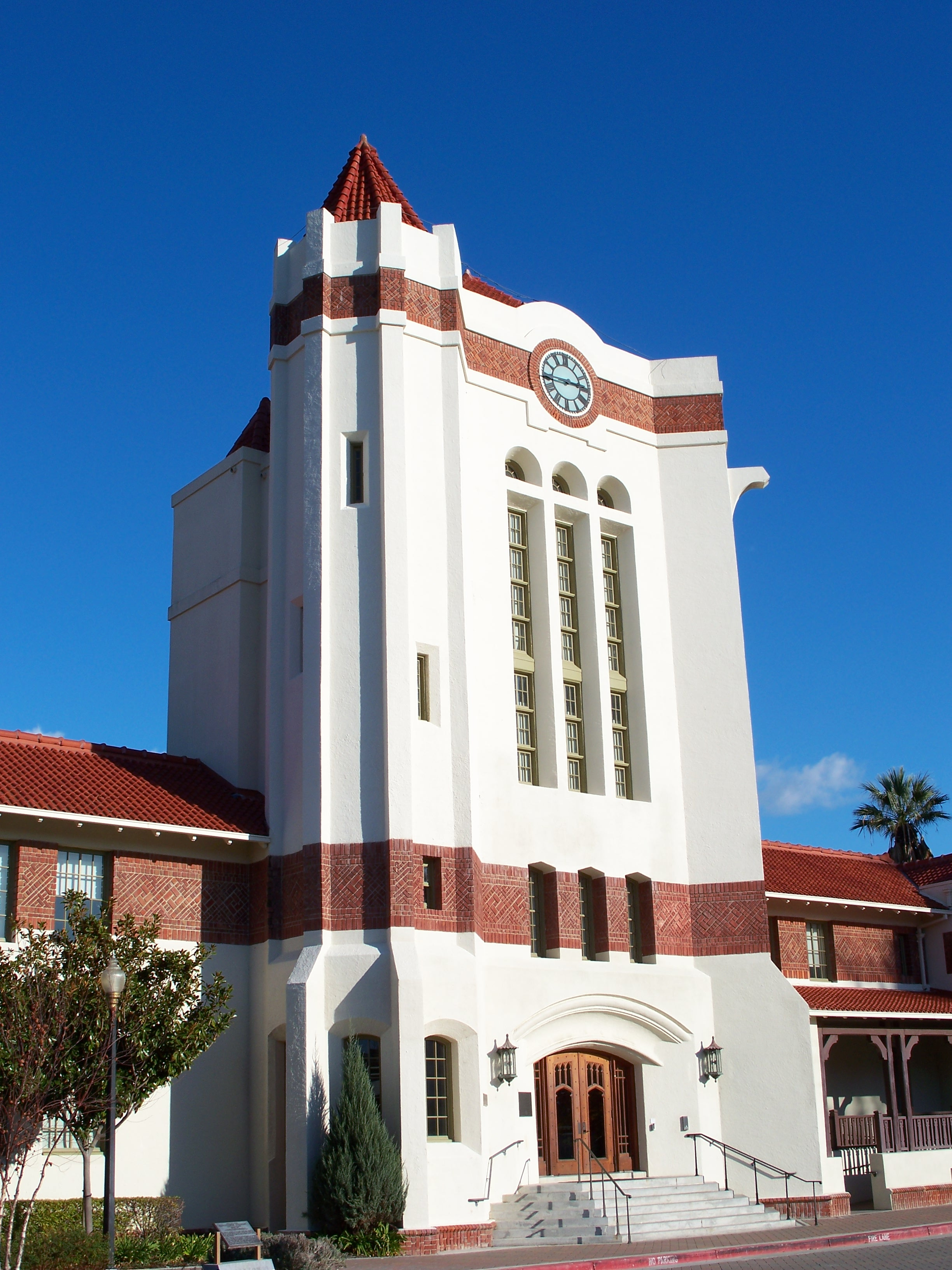

- Location within San Jose, California Location within California Location within the United States
- Location: 4000 Lafayette St., Santa Clara, California, 3500 Zanker Rd., San Jose, California
- Coordinates: 37°23′38″N 121°57′10″W
- Built: 1906
- Architects: Stocking, Leonard, State Architect; George C. Sellon, George McDougall
- Architectural style: Mission Revival—Spanish Colonial Revival
- NRHP reference No.: 97000829
- Added to NRHP: August 13, 1997

Agnews Developmental Center was a state institution located on two campuses in the U.S. state of California; one in Santa Clara and one in San Jose. Founded in 1885 as a psychiatric facility for the mentally ill, it operated for over a century before closing in stages between 1998 and 2011. Over time, its mission expanded to include people with developmental disabilities, which became its sole focus after psychiatric programs were discontinued in 1972 following deinstitutionalization.

== History ==
In 1885, the center, originally the Great Asylum for the Insane, was established for the care of the mentally ill. The building cost $750,000. The main red brick structure, was on land near Agnew's Village, which later became part of Santa Clara. The building was modeled on the Kirkbride Plan and designed by the architect Theodore Lenzen. By the early twentieth century, Agnews boasted the largest institutional population in the South San Francisco Bay area, and was served by two train stations designated for Agnews, at the west end of Palm Drive across Lafayette Street. The train station closest to Palm Drive survived until vandalism and fire precipitated its demolition in the mid-1990s while the other one remains standing to date, now as a model railroad showroom.

The psychiatrist Frederick W. Hatch was Superintendent of Agnews Insane Asylum from the fall of 1889 until 1897. He later served as the General Superintendent of State Hospitals in California for some 20 years.

The 1906 San Francisco earthquake destroyed the facility and nearby buildings. 117 patients and staff were killed and buried in mass graves on the site. Agnews became infamous as the site of the Santa Clara Valley's greatest loss of life resulting from the quake. The Daily Palo Alto reported: "The position of the people in Agnews is critical; a number of insane persons having escaped from the demolished asylum, are running at random about the country."

Following this disaster, Agnews was rebuilt in the Mediterranean Revival architecture styles of Mission Revival—Spanish Colonial Revival, in a layout resembling a college campus of two-story buildings. It re-opened circa 1911 as Agnews State Mental Hospital. The facility was a small self-contained town, including a many construction trade "shops", a farm which raised pigs and vegetable crops, a steam generating power plant for heat, and a fire department.

In 1926, the center was expanded to include a second campus about 2 miles (3 km) to the east on Zanker road in San Jose (37°24′32″N 121°55′53″W). A hospital was later built for that campus in the early 1960s.

Individuals with developmental disabilities were first admitted to a special rehabilitation program in 1965. Programs for the mentally ill were discontinued in 1971 following deinstitutionalization, and the last mentally ill patient left Agnews in June of the following year. After deinstitutionalization, both campuses were used for the care and treatment of people with developmental disabilities. In 1985, the campuses were officially renamed Agnews Developmental Center. Activity of the west campus shifted to the east campus in 1995 as the former campus was scheduled to close. In 1996, the west campus was sold and later redeveloped by Sun Microsystems. The east campus remained operational until it was sold and closed in 2011.

== West campus closure ==
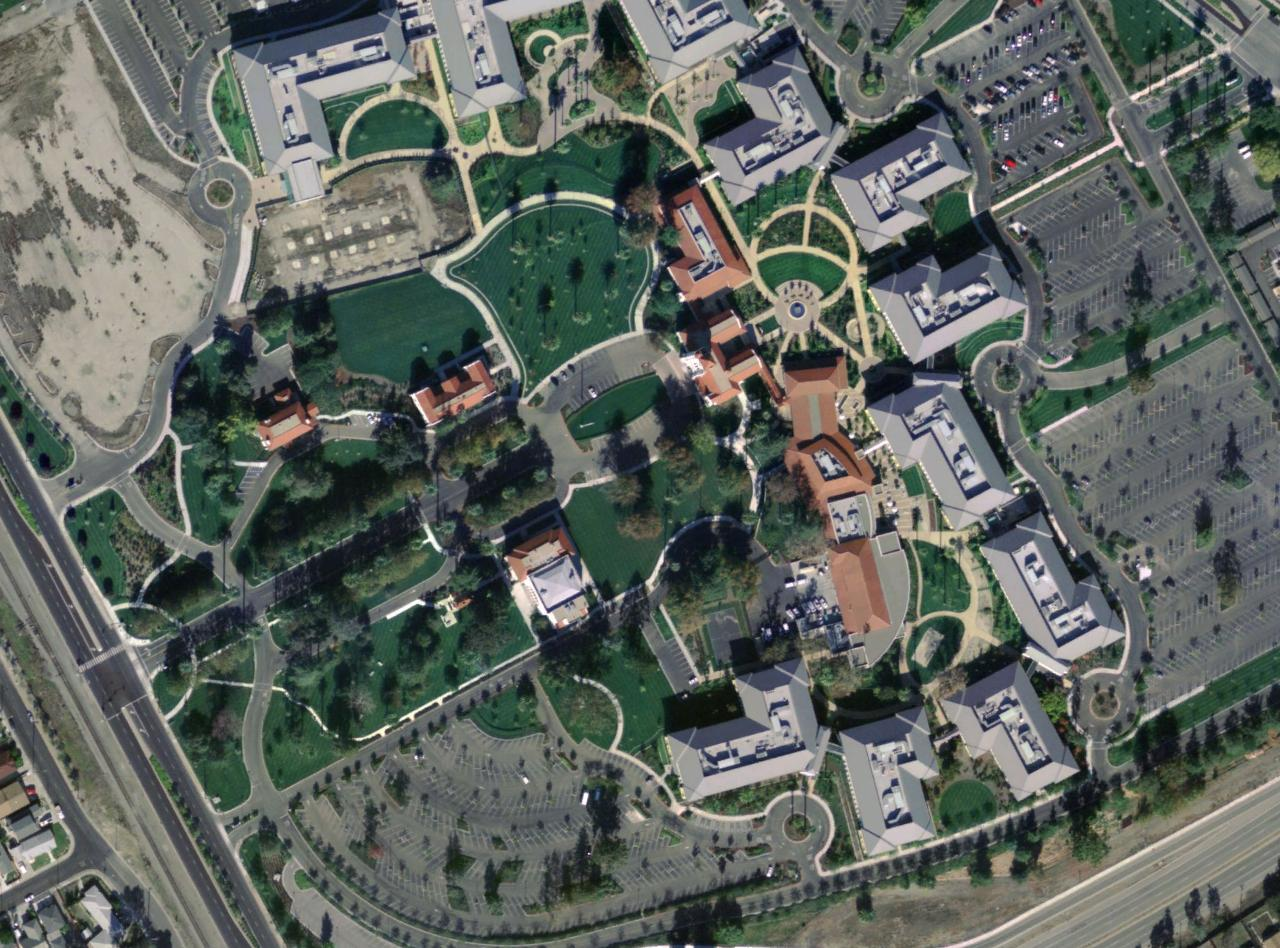
Aerial photograph of the Oracle campus at the former Agnews west campus

The original west campus was closed in 1995 as part of a plan to reduce and eventually close the center. When the west campus closed, the use of the land was the subject of local controversy. In April 1997, it was announced the state would sell an 82.5-acre (33.4 ha) parcel of the campus to Sun Microsystems for its corporate headquarters and R&D campus. Some objected to the arranged sale of this prime public land to a profitable corporation at the peak of a local economic and real-estate boom, while others valued the presence of a prominent high-tech employer. Also at issue was the preservation of and public access to historic Agnews Developmental Center buildings. Sun agreed to restore four of the historic buildings (the auditorium, the clock tower, the superintendent's villa, and the administration building) and to keep some of the facilities available for public use. An outdoor exhibit open to the public displays information and photographs regarding the center and its history. A small museum opened next to a cemetery and is still open.

In addition to the Sun deal, the Rivermark planned community was allocated 152 acres (62 ha) for a variety of residential, retail, public school, and open space uses.

The Agnews site was added to the National Register of Historic Places (under the name "Agnews Insane Asylum") on August 13, 1997.

Sun was acquired by Oracle Corporation in 2010; part of the campus continues to be used as an Oracle R&D facility and conference center.

Oracle put 40% of the campus up for sale in 2022, with plans proposed in 2024 to convert that portion into a housing development.

== East campus closure ==
In March 2009, the last patient moved out of the east campus and the residential facility was closed. The east campus provided outpatient clinic services through April 2011.

In July 2011, the Regional Project of the Bay Area and the Community State Staff Administration moved to Campbell and continued providing support to patients in the local area.

With the final sale of the land pending, the east campus was vacated and the land was turned over to the Department of General Services.

In July 2014, the City of San Jose and the Santa Clara Unified School District purchased the property from the State of California for $80 million with the intent to build a K-5 school, a middle school, a high school, and a city park. Demolition of the site started in late 2018 with construction starting soon after. The first two schools, Abram Agnew Elementary School and Dolores Huerta Middle School opened in August 2021. The third school, Kathleen MacDonald High School, opened the following year. The city park includes two restored historic buildings, the auditorium and the mansion, both of which are available for community events. Inside the refurbished auditorium is a small history museum. Outside, many of the 100+ year old heritage trees were preserved and the grounds beautified for public use.

== In popular media ==
The 1984 film Birdy by director Alan Parker used the center for the facility where the title character played by Matthew Modine is incarcerated.

The 1989 horror film The Dead Pit by director Brett Leonard was shot at the east campus.

The punk rock band Green Day recorded the music video for its 1994 song "Basket Case" at Agnews.
