= Thomas Foon Chew =

Chinese-American businessman

- 赵灿垣
- Chew in 1916
- Born: 1889; Heshan, Guangdong, China
- Died: February 25, 1931 (aged 41–42); San Jose, California, U.S.
- Occupations: Businessman; Cannery owner

Thomas Foon Chew (Chinese: 赵灿垣; pinyin: Zhào Cànyuán) (1889–February 25, 1931) was a Chinese American immigrant who became the richest Chinese-American in California and became known as the "Asparagus King" in the 1920s.

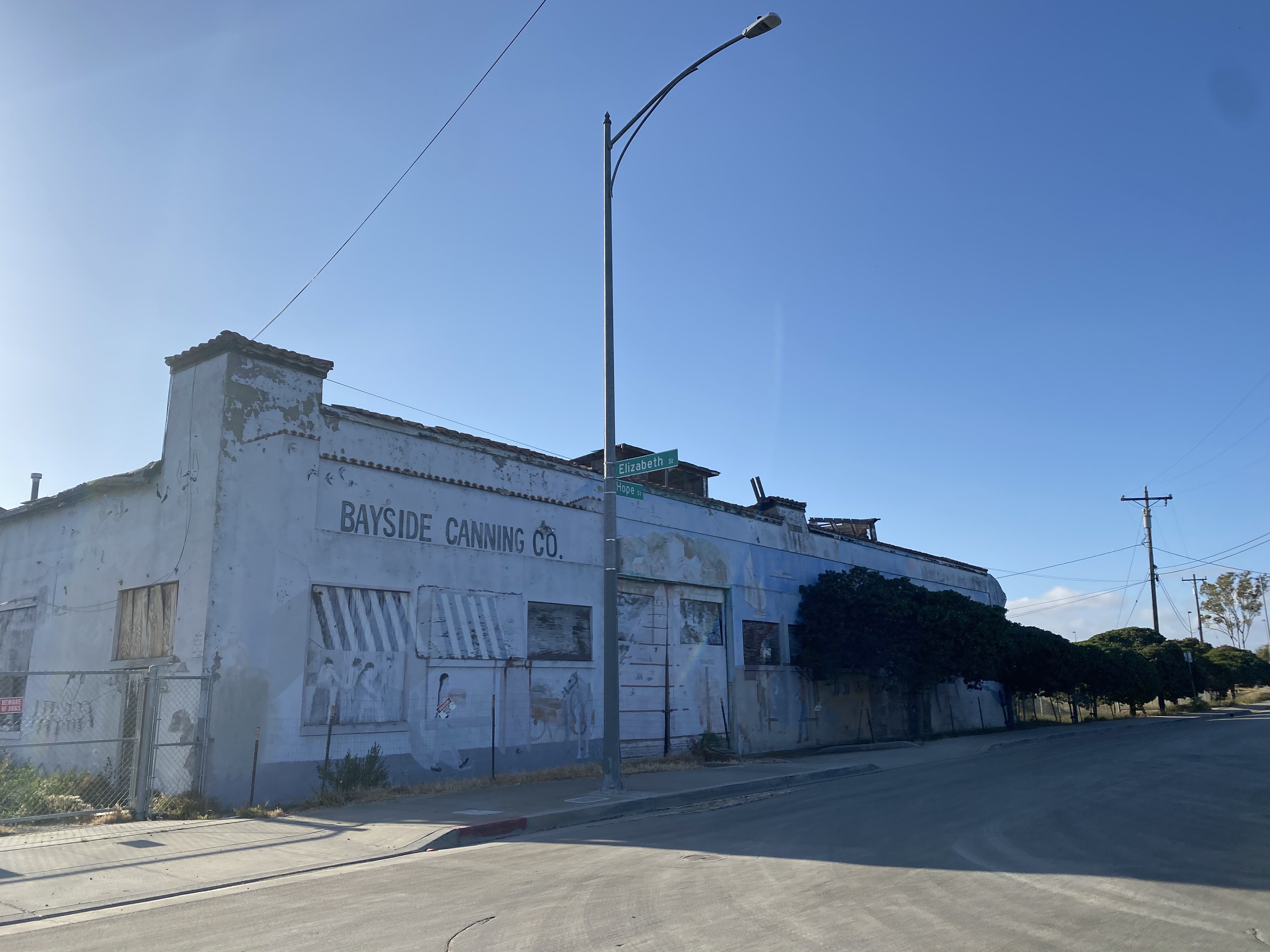
Bayside Cannery in 2012 (Alviso, San Jose, California)

Chew was born in Heshan, Guangdong in 1889. In 1897, at the age of 8, he immigrated to California with his mother to join his father, Sai Yen Chew, who owned the Precita Canning Company in San Francisco. The Chinese Exclusion Act of 1882 would have prevented their entrance, but they received an exemption for Chinese merchants. After the 1906 earthquake destroyed the family's cannery, Chew's father established the Bayside Canning Company, in Alviso at the southern tip of San Francisco Bay, and brought his son into business with him. Thomas Chew expanded the cannery from tomatoes to other fruit and vegetables, and added canneries elsewhere. In the 1920's, Bayside Cannery became the third-largest canning business in the United States.

In addition to the canneries, Chew's business endeavors included over 8,000 acres of farm land in the Sacramento-San Joaquin River Delta, which he ran as the "Thomas Foon Ranch Company".

In 1918, Chew bought 4 acres of land in what is now Palo Alto, California, where he constructed the Bayside Canning Company. The cannery building later housed other businesses including Fry's Electronics, which closed its store in 2020. In September of 2023, Palo Alto city council reached a deal with the Sobrato Organization to redevelop the property for housing and a park but with 40% of the cannery building demolished despite protests by preservationists to the demolition. The city council also indicated an interest in changing the name of Portage Drive, the adjacent road, to Thomas Foon Chew Avenue.

In 1919, Chew build a cannery for asparagus and spinach in Isleton, California in the Sacramento-San Joaquin River Delta, the center of asparagus growing in the United States at the time, and perfected the means of canning asparagus to be shipped elsewhere in the US. He became known as the "Asparagus King".

Chew died of pneumonia in 1931 at the age of 42, leaving behind seven children. His memorial parade along Grant Avenue in San Francisco's Chinatown was attended by twenty-five thousand people.
