= Alviso, San Jose =

Alviso
- Neighborhood of San Jose
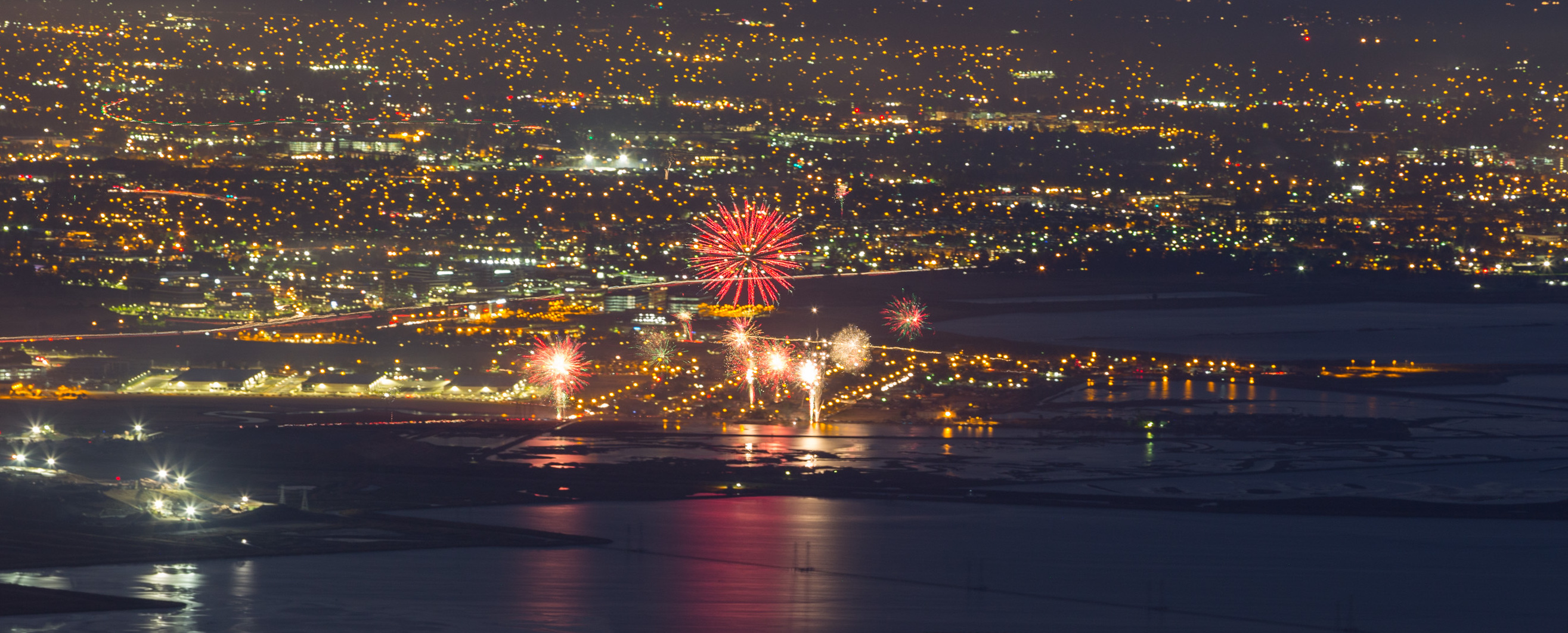
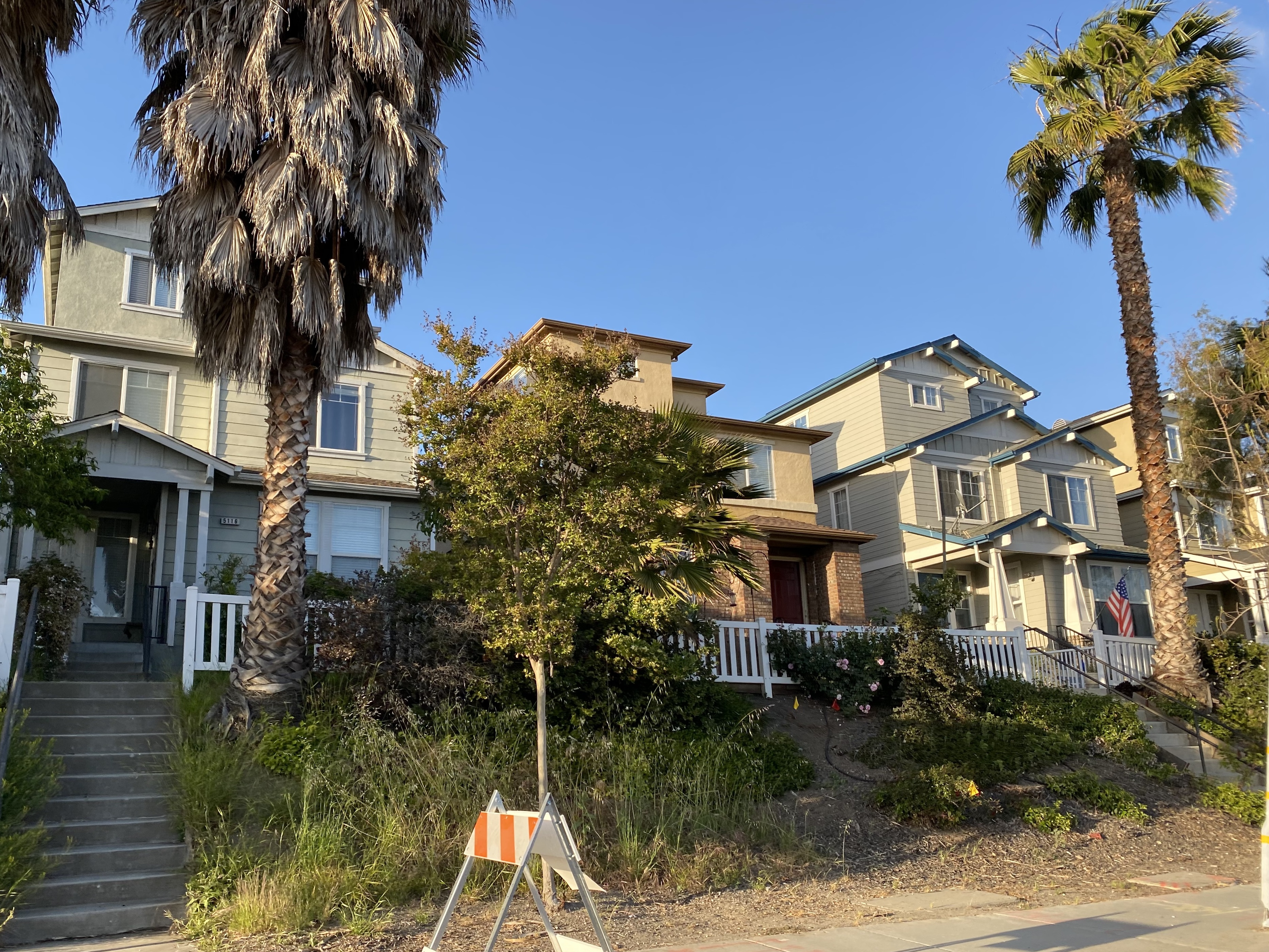
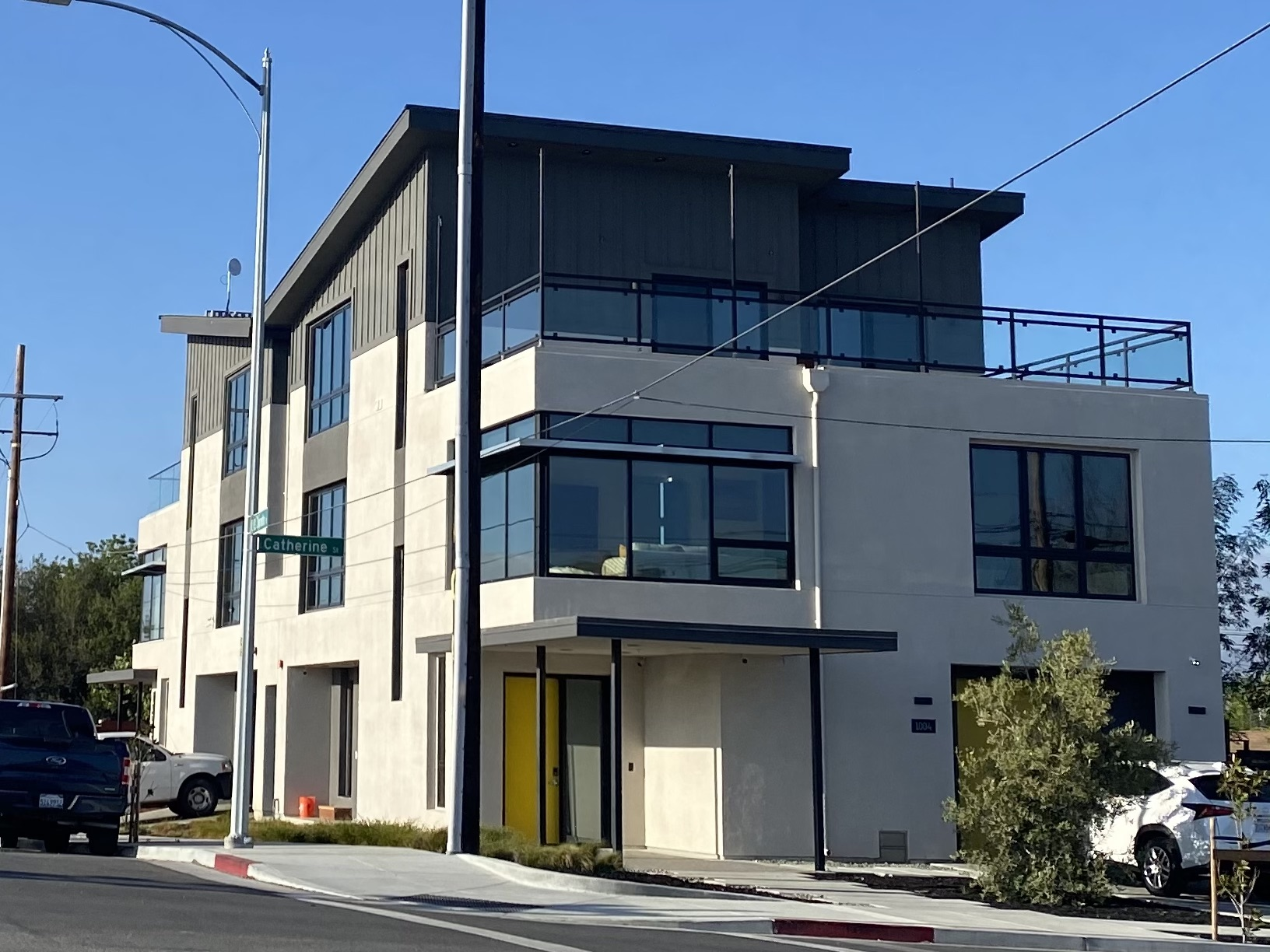
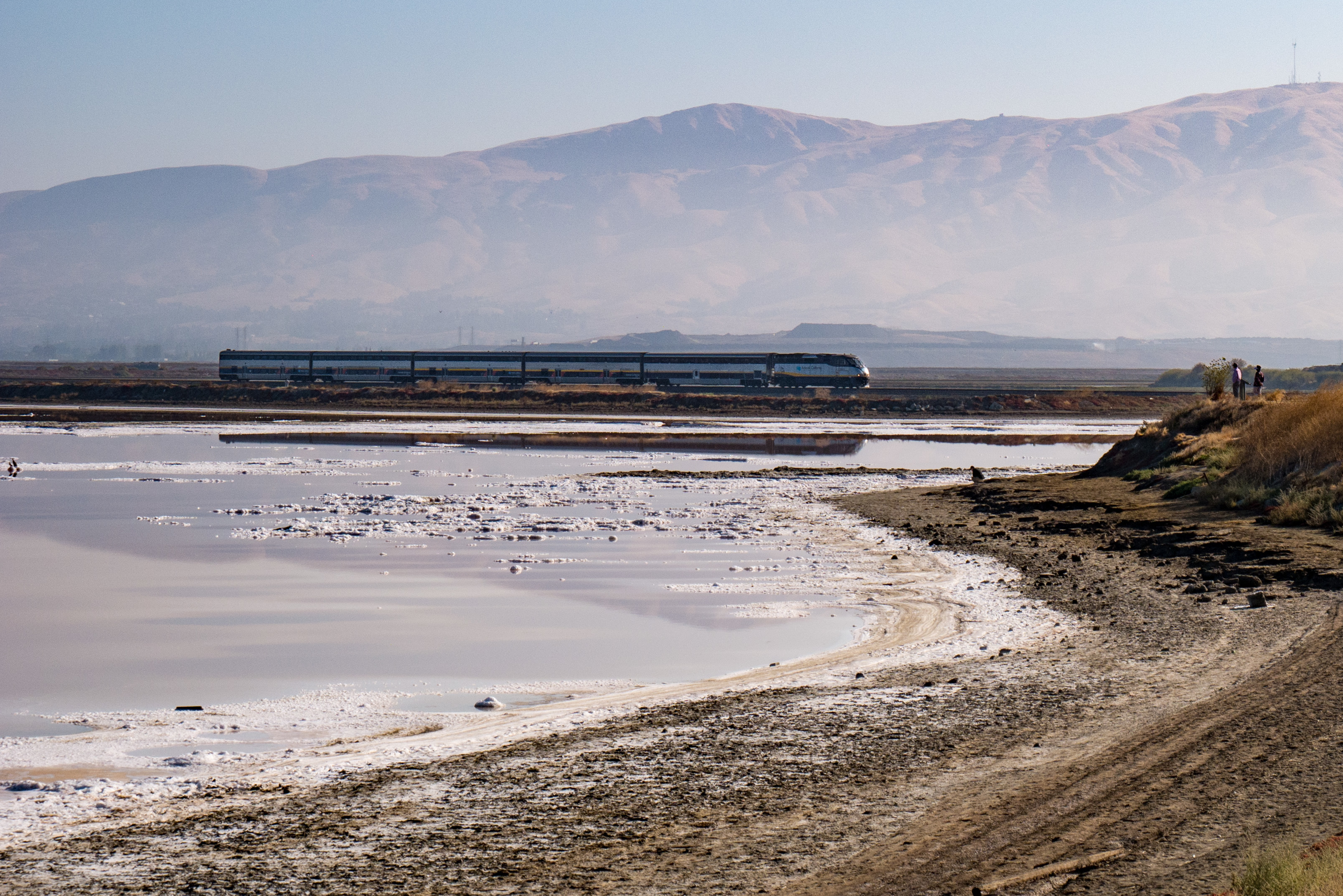
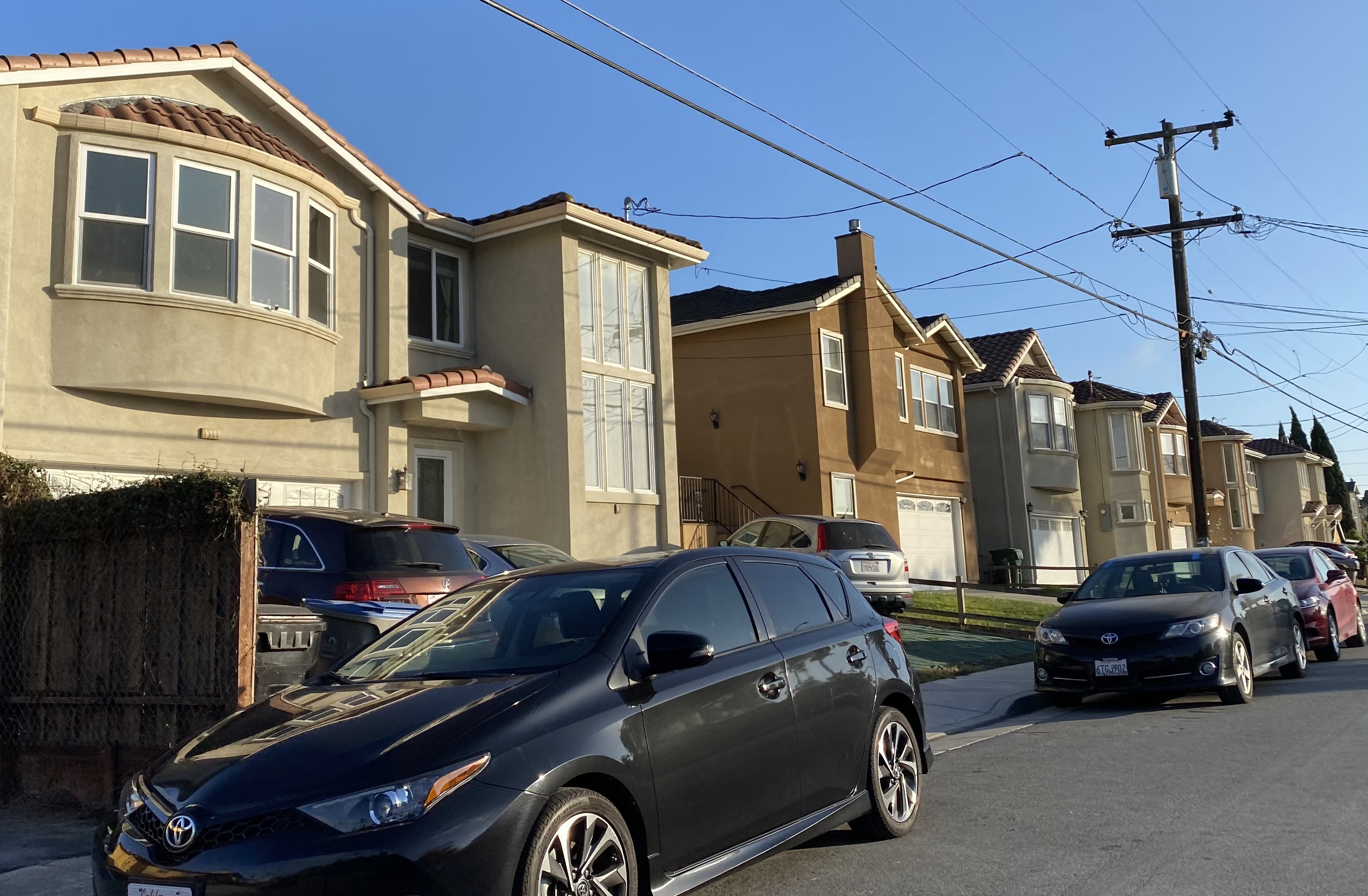
- Clockwise: Aerial view of New Years Eve celebrations in Alviso; new townhomes in El Dorado; homes in Alviso; San Francisco Bay; townhomes on North First.

- Location within San Jose
- Coordinates: 37°25′30″N 121°58′0″W
- Country: United States
- State: California
- Region: San Francisco Bay Area
- County: Santa Clara County
- Incorporated (City of Alviso): March 26, 1852
- Consolidated with San Jose: March 12, 1968

Population (2020)
  - Total: 2,251
- Demonym: Alvisans
- Time zone: UTC−8 (Pacific)
  - Summer (DST): UTC−7 (PDT)
- ZIP Code: 95002
- Area codes: 408/669
- GNIS feature ID: 233410
- Alviso Historic District
- U.S. National Register of Historic Places
- U.S. Historic district
- Coordinates: 37°25′30″N 121°58′0″W
- Area: 9 acres (3.6 ha)
- Built: 1851
- NRHP reference No.: 73000449
- Added to NRHP: October 9, 1973

Alviso is a district of San Jose, California, located in North San Jose on the southern shores of San Francisco Bay. Originally an independent town, founded in 1852, today Alviso is San Jose's only waterfront district, primarily residential in nature, with several Silicon Valley tech companies and recreation-oriented businesses. Alviso is named after 19th-century Californio ranchero Ignacio Alviso, who owned the area as part of his Rancho Rincón de Los Esteros.

The Guadalupe River separates Alviso from Santa Clara and Sunnyvale to the west, while Coyote Creek separates Alviso from Milpitas to the east. Alviso is the lowest point in the San Francisco Bay Area at 13 feet (4.0 m) below sea level.

== History ==
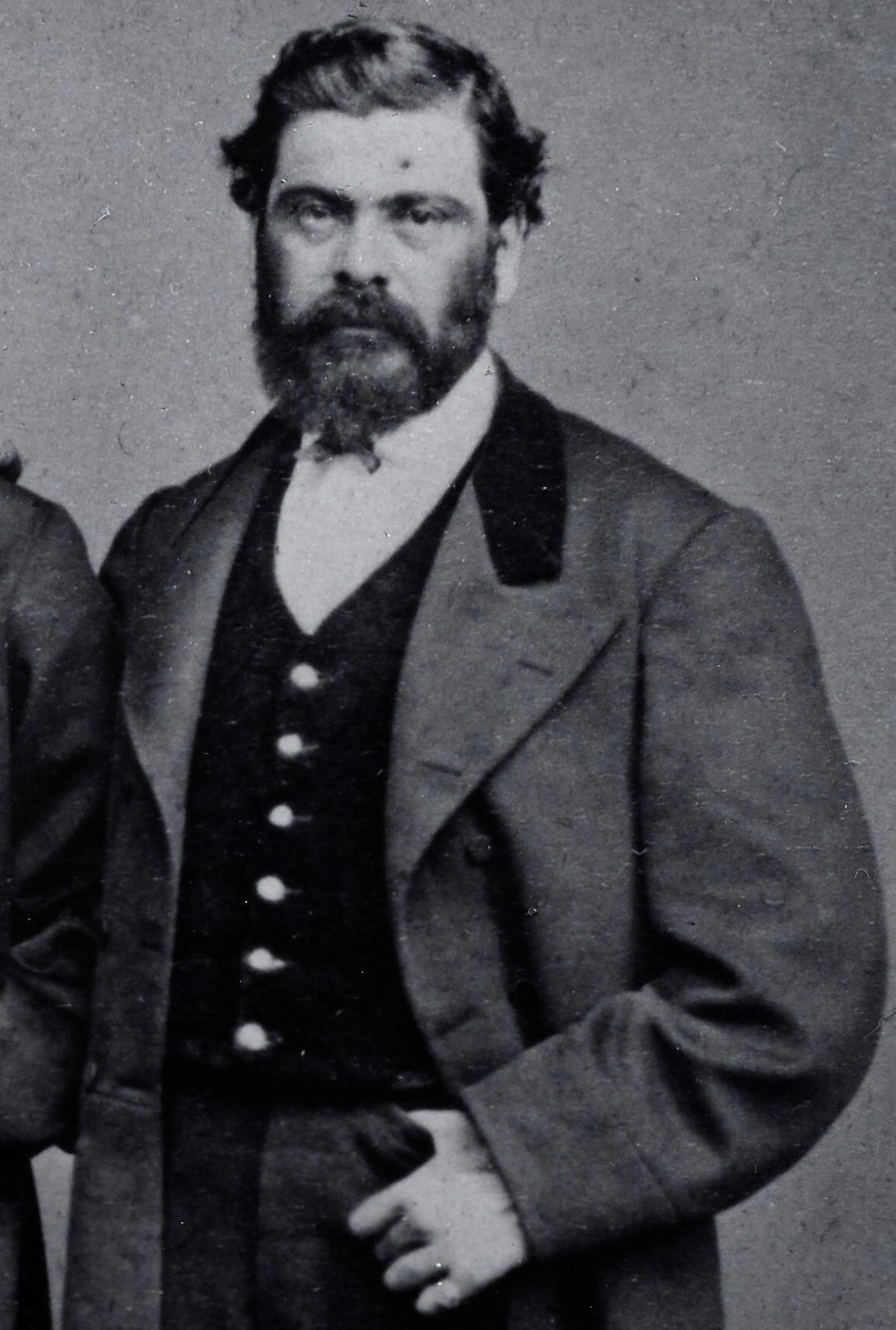
Alviso is named after Californio ranchero Ignacio Alviso, owner of Rancho Rincón de Los Esteros.

Alviso was first settled in the 18th century. The community was named for Ignacio Alviso, the son of Corporal Domingo Alviso, one of the original members of the de Anza expedition. Corporal Alviso lived but a short time after reaching San Francisco and was buried March 11, 1777. Alviso's descendants were granted the Rancho Rincón de los Esteros holding. In 1840 Ignacio Alviso moved from Mission Santa Clara de Asís to this 3,653 acres (14.78 km^{2}) ranchero. From this port, beaver pelts, cattle hides and tallow went to San Francisco.

The city of Alviso was incorporated and became the first chartered city in the State of California on March 26, 1852, as the boating and shipping port of San José and the transportation hub for the Santa Clara Valley to the San Francisco Bay. Steamboats traveled regularly between San Francisco and Alviso. That usage declined with the growth in railroad transportation between San Francisco and San José. In 1864 Alviso was bypassed by the San Francisco and San Jose Railroad, (later part of the Southern Pacific Railroad). However, in the 1880s Alviso was a stop on the Newark line of Southern Pacific Railroad between San José and Oakland.

Alviso was the home to a series of several successful business ventures. Alviso Mills, founded in 1853, at its peak produced up to 300 barrels of flour a day. As wheat production in the San Joaquín Valley grew, production in the Santa Clara Valley waned and the Alviso Mills closed in 1885. In 1906, Sai Yin Chew opened the Bayside Canning Company there, and at its peak, under his son Thomas Foon Chew, was the 3rd largest cannery in the United States. During the Great Depression Alviso was known for its dance halls and gambling establishments. In the 1960s and 1970s, a small independent boat building community developed there.

The city ceased to exist when it was consolidated with the City of San Jose on March 12, 1968, following a 189 to 180 vote in favor of consolidation. The city's final census was in 1960 when it recorded a population of 1,174. The United States Postal Service still recognizes "Alviso" as a place name. Mail is not delivered in Alviso, but must be picked up at the post office.

After the 1970s, Alviso was treated like a socioeconomic backwater of the prospering Silicon Valley business community and struggled to restore its former vitality. On October 9, 1973, 9 acres (3.6 ha) were added to the National Register of Historic Places listings in Santa Clara County, California as site 73000449 under the name Alviso Historic District. The listing cited 11 historic structures and alternative name Embarcadero de Santa Clara, although exact boundaries were not disclosed. The floods of the early 1980s were devastating to Alviso, especially because Alviso is below sea level and is on marshland. Water was as much as 10 feet (3 m) deep in some locations. A number of homes and businesses were destroyed. Some of the picturesque character of the town was lost.

Shipping and industry have left Alviso, leaving it mostly as a small residential neighborhood. Digital video recorder company TiVo and Polycom have their corporate headquarters in Alviso. Many salt evaporation ponds formerly owned by Cargill in the neighborhood are being converted to wetlands as part of the Don Edwards San Francisco Bay National Wildlife Refuge.

Throughout the 20th century, Alviso was victim to severe flooding, most recently in 1983 and 1995.

As of 2021, Amtrak trains and the Altamont Corridor Express still cross through Alviso on the Coast Line.

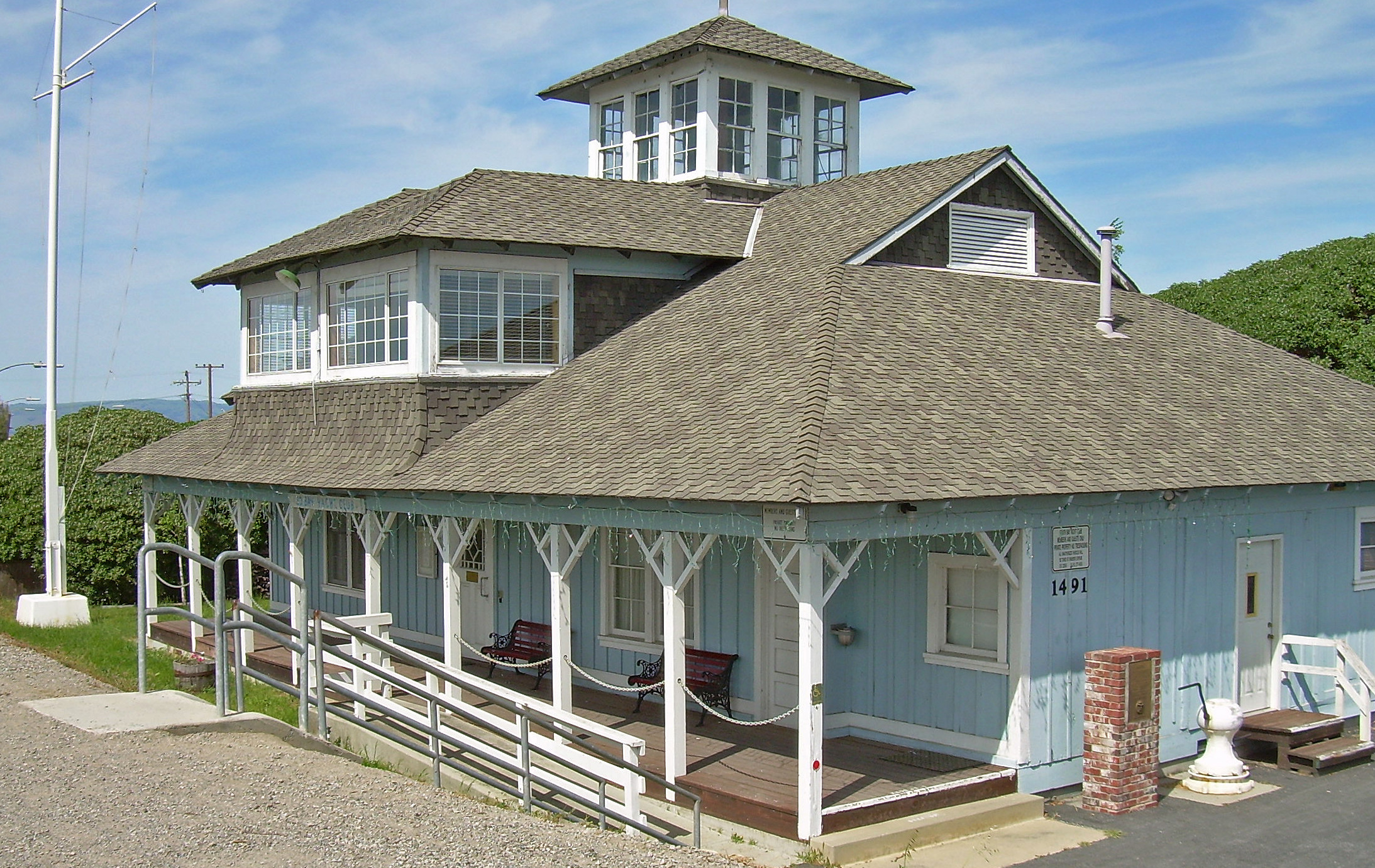
The historic South Bay Yacht Club, founded in 1888

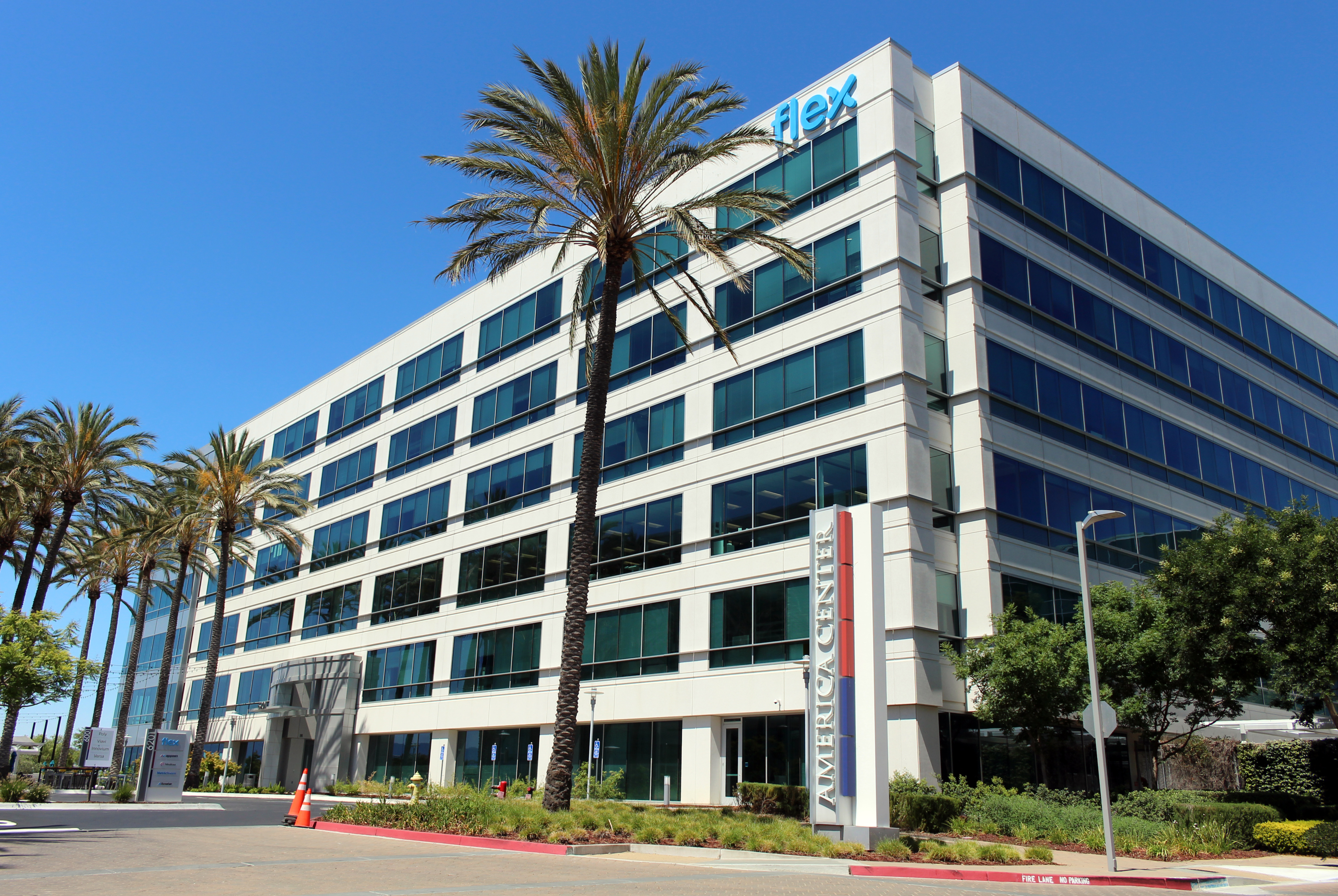
Flex headquarters in Alviso

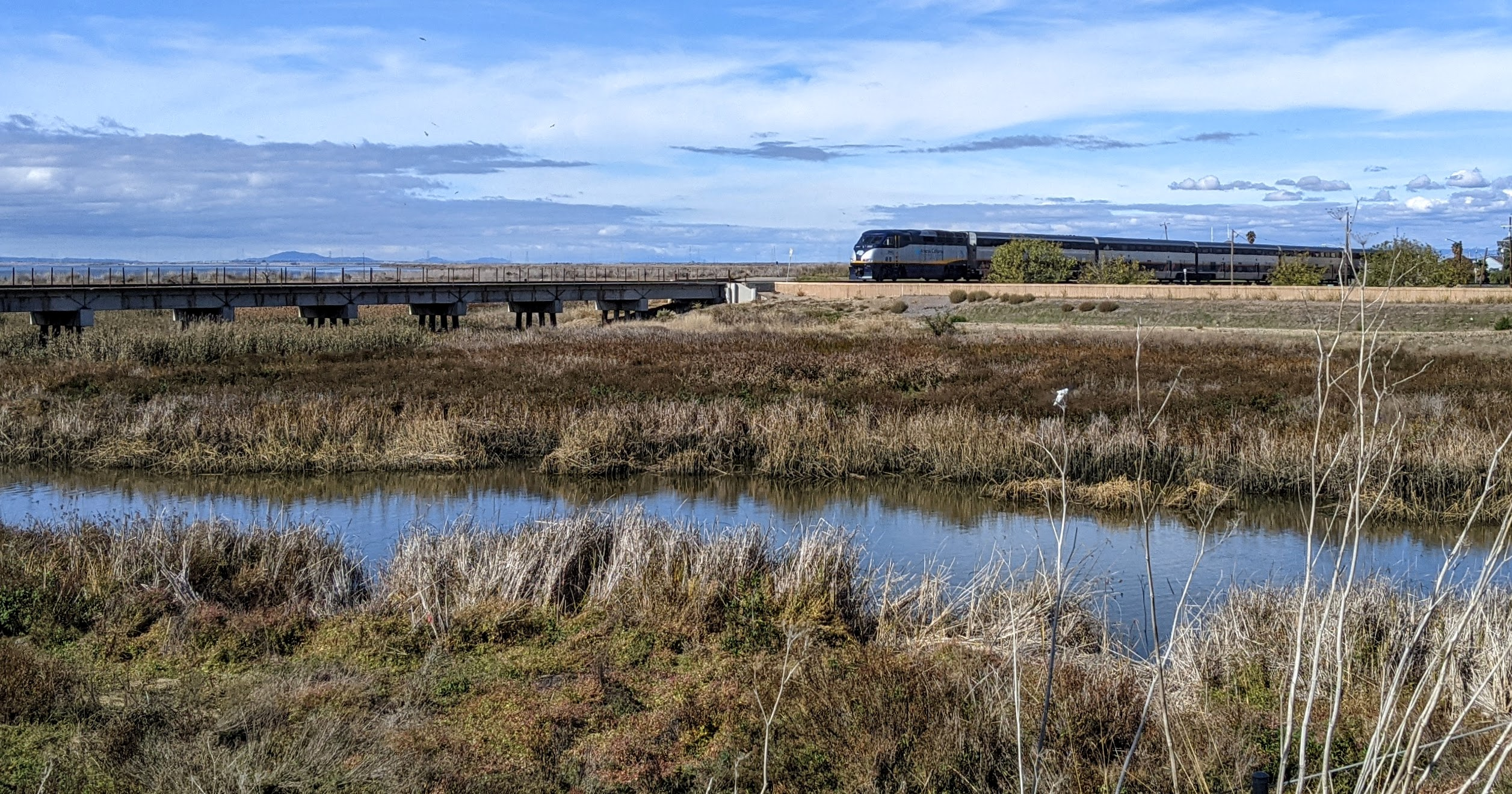
Amtrak train at Guadalupe River, Alviso

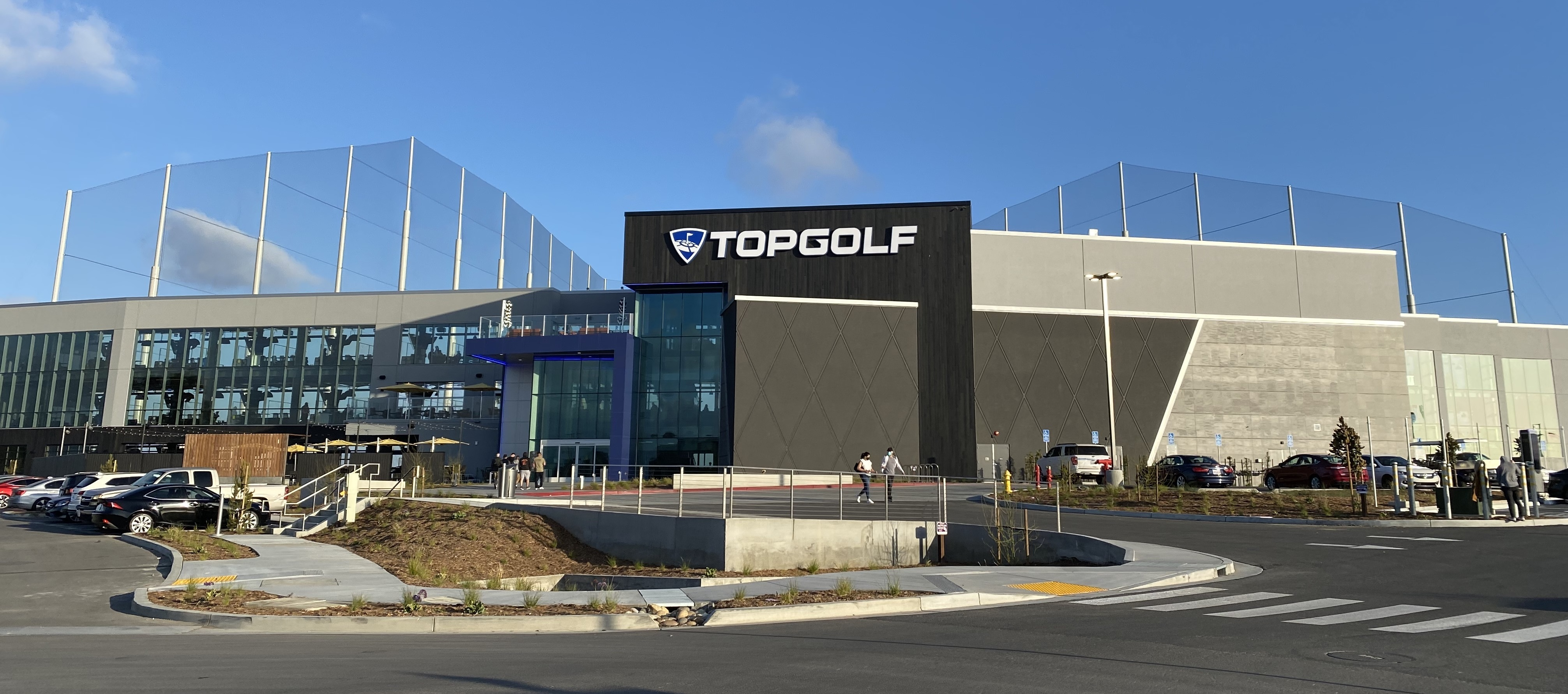
Topgolf San Jose

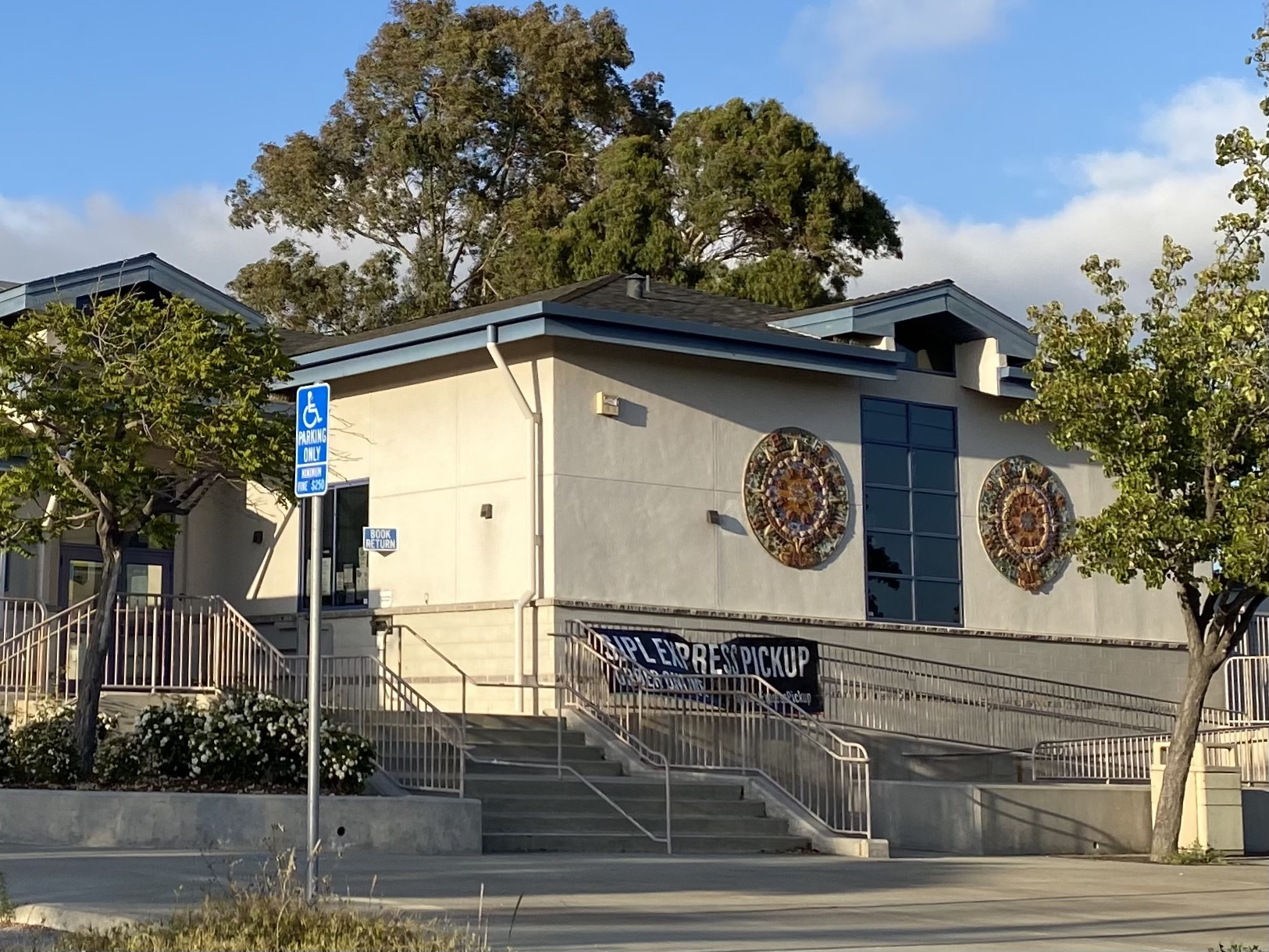
Alviso Branch Library of the San José Public Library

== Demographics ==
=== 2020 ===
The 2020 census reported that Alviso had a population of 2,251. With a total of 558 households with an average size of 4.03 people and 428 families. The racial makeup of Alviso was 539 (23.9%) White, 316 (14.0%) Asian (4.9% Indian, 3.5% Vietnamese 3.3% Chinese and 1.1% Filipino), 38 (1.7%) Native American, 1,200 (53.3%) from other races, and 109 (4.8%) from two or more races. There were 1,374 residents of Hispanic or Latino background (61%). 59.6% of the neighborhood's population was of Mexican descent.

=== 2000 census ===
According to the 2020–2024 American Community Survey 5-year estimates, ZIP Code Tabulation Area (ZCTA) 95002, which includes the former City of Alviso, had a population of 1,542. As of the census of 2000, there were 2,128 people, 506 households, and 400 families residing in the ZCTA. There were 514 housing units.

The racial makeup of the ZCTA was 40.8% White, 0.6% African American, 1.1% Native American, 2.7% Asian, 50.5% from other races, and 4.3% from two or more races. Hispanic or Latino of any race were 75.4% of the population.

The median income for a household in the ZCTA was $87,679, and the median income for a family was $105,827. Males had a median income of $58,750 versus $56,875 for females. The per capita income for the ZCTA was $62,452. About 3.8% of families and 5.1% of the population were below the poverty line, including 11.8% of those under the age of eighteen and 10.4% of those sixty five or over.

== Attractions ==
=== Alviso Marina County Park ===
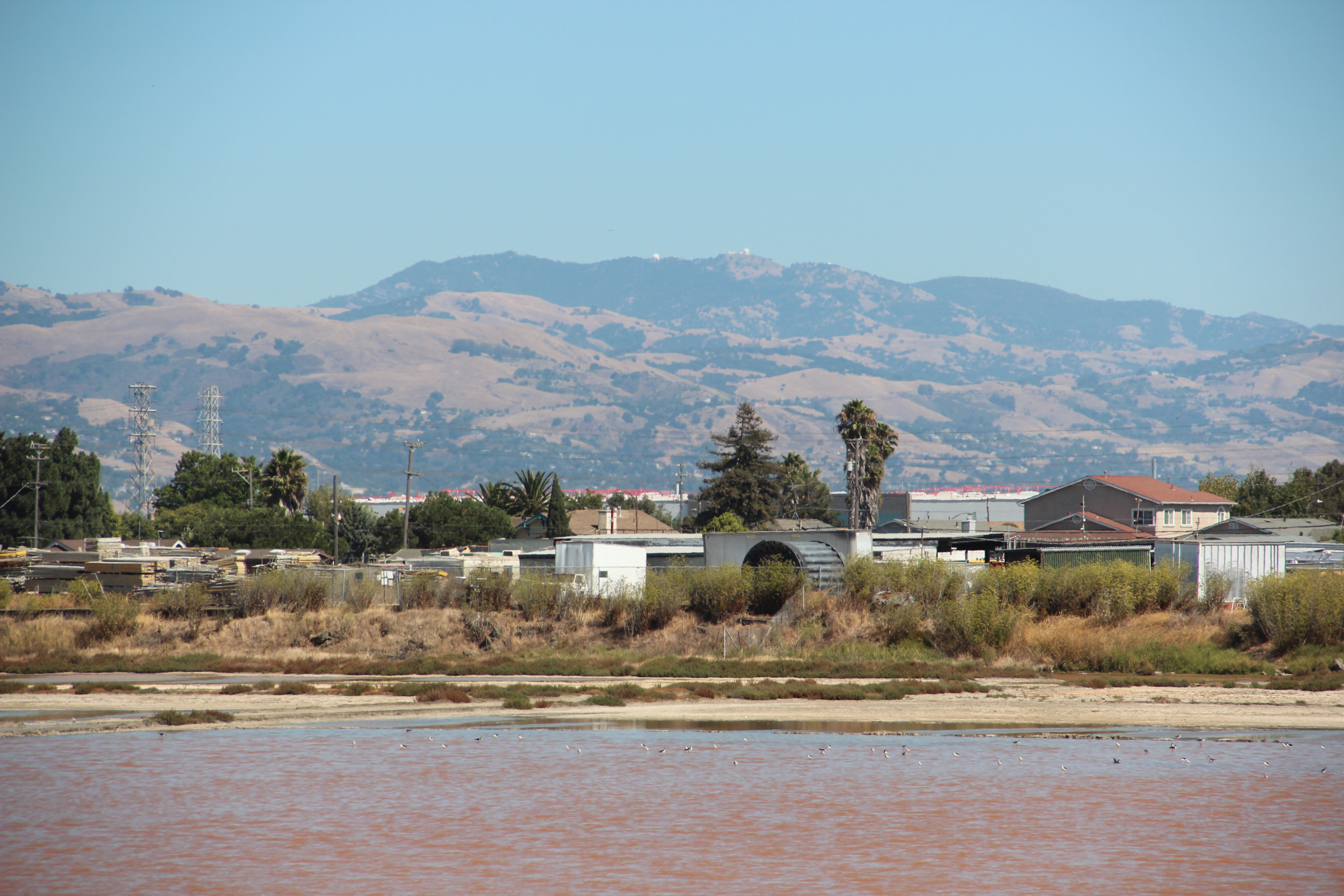
View of Alviso from San Francisco Bay, with Mt. Hamilton and the Diablo Mountains in the background

This 18.9 acres (76,000 m^{2}) bayside park, though small in size, offers a great deal of activities within its boundaries and on into the Wildlife Refuge. The first phase of improvements, which included construction of a boardwalk, trails, observation deck, signage, picnic areas, and improvements to the parking lot, was completed in 2005. A second phase, completed in 2010, added new boat launch ramps, a parking lot for boat trailers, and wetland mitigation areas. Both the pathways and boardwalks of the County Park and trails around the ponds in the adjacent Wildlife Refuge offer fantastic views of the mountains surrounding the bay, and of the wildlife that call these ponds home.

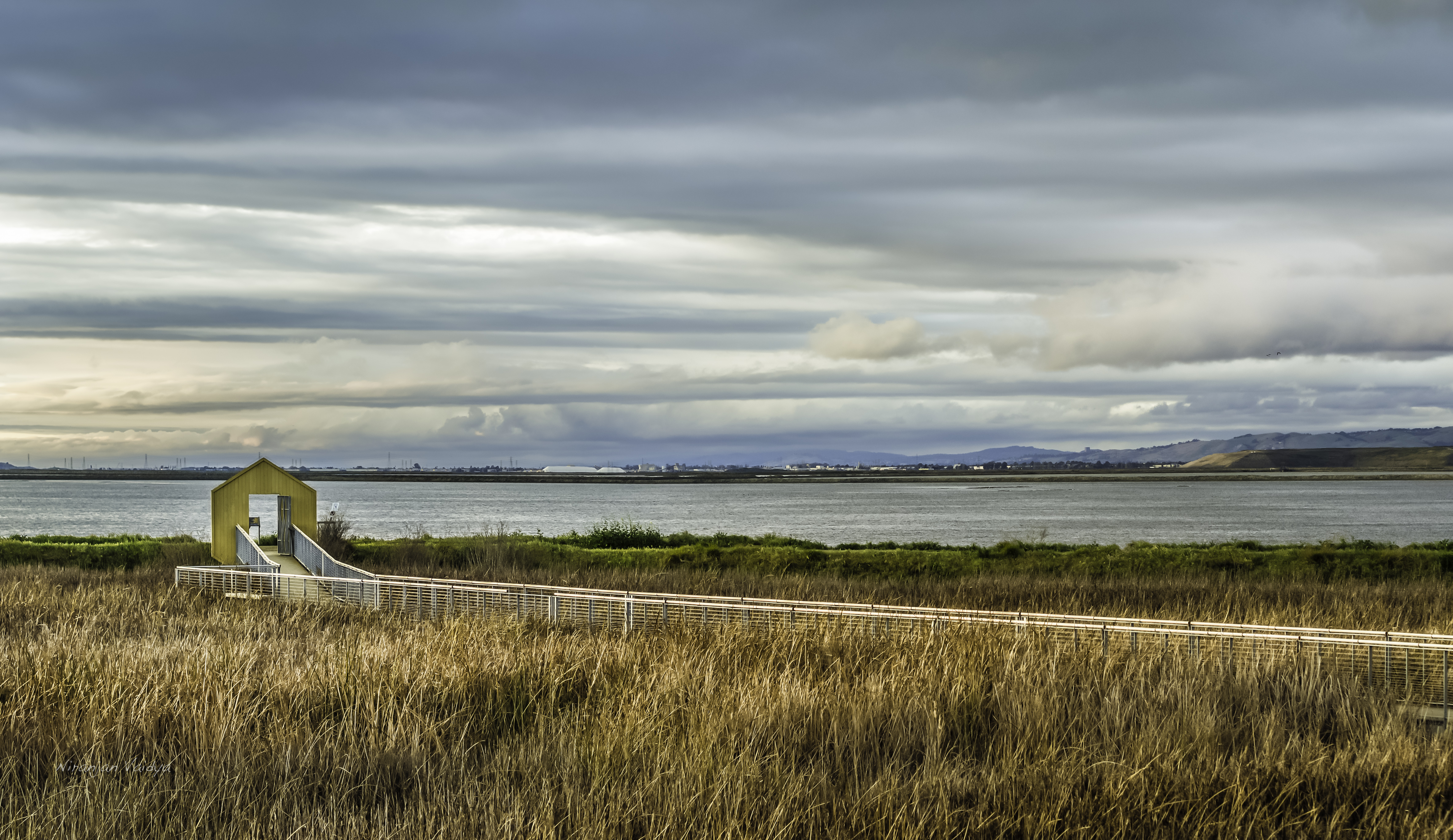
Alviso Marina County Park

Dogs are allowed in the County Park's pathways and picnic areas, but are not allowed on the trails, levees and boardwalks. Bicycles are allowed on all pathways and trails in the park, but should be walked when on the boardwalks. The launch ramp provides one of the few clear routes in the San Jose area through the salt marshes out to the open waters of the San Francisco Bay.

Day on the Bay

Every year on a Sunday in October Alviso celebrates Day on the Bay, a multicultural event, free for all, sponsored by Santa Clara County. Day on the Bay attracts families with music, food, booths for community organizations, Halloween pumpkins, kayak rides, and other activities.

Day on the Bay began on October 16, 2010, to celebrate the opening of the newly renovated Marina Park. About 5,000 people were in attendance from all around the county. The event was created to celebrate the new city attraction but also to attract a diverse crowd to the outdoor recreational setting.

=== Don Edwards San Francisco Bay National Wildlife Refuge ===
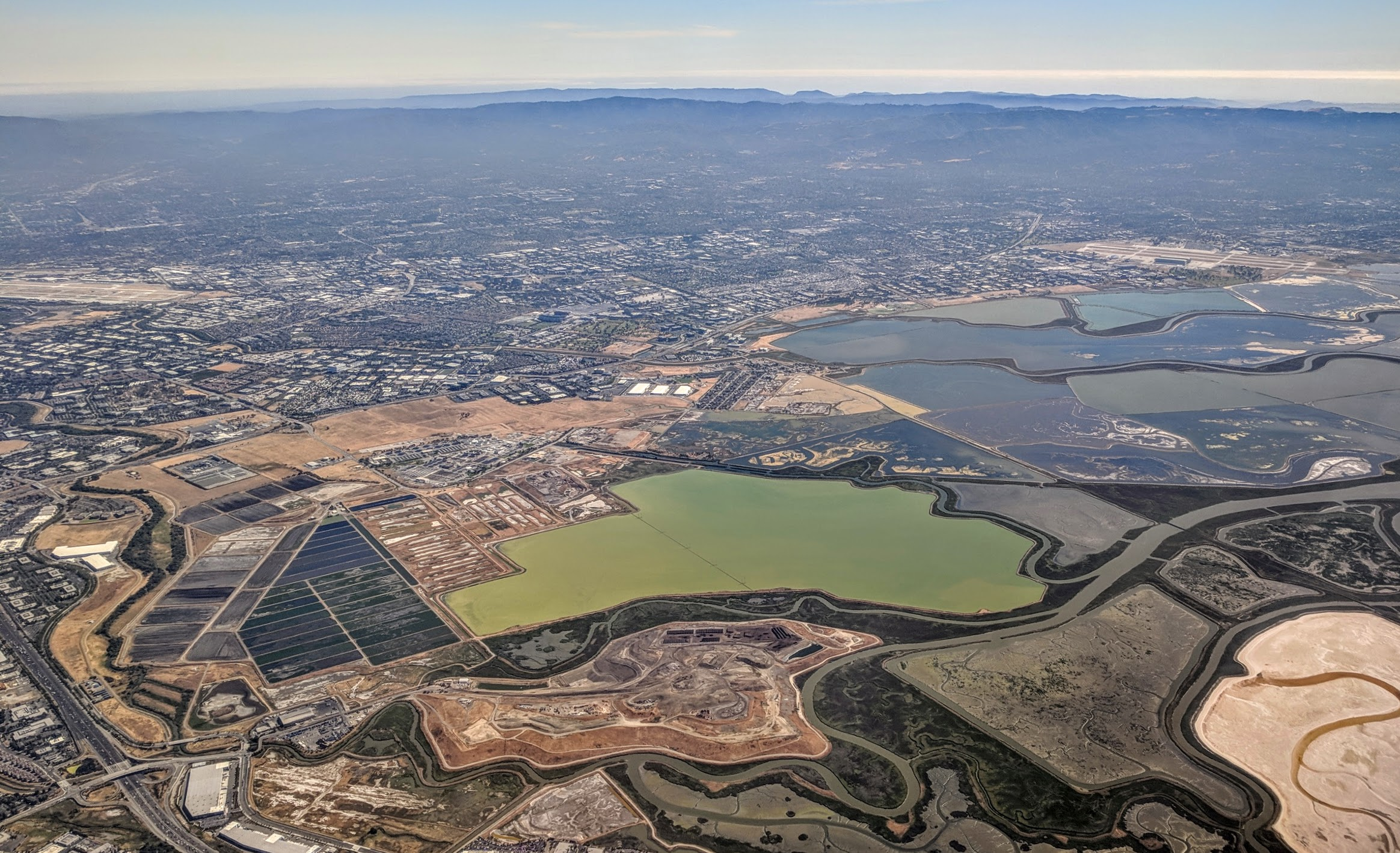
Aerial view showing salt ponds (and former salt ponds) in and around Alviso

Don Edwards San Francisco Bay National Wildlife Refuge, the first urban National Wildlife Refuge established in the United States, is dedicated to preserving and enhancing wildlife habitat, protecting migratory birds, protecting threatened and endangered species, and providing opportunities for wildlife-oriented recreation and nature study for the surrounding communities.

As of 2004, the Refuge spans 30,000 acres (12,000 ha) of open bay, salt pond, salt marsh, mudflat, upland and vernal pool habitats located throughout south San Francisco Bay. Located along the Pacific Flyway, the Refuge hosts over 280 species of birds each year. Millions of shorebirds and waterfowl stop to refuel at the Refuge during the spring and fall migration. In addition to its seasonal visitors, the Refuge provides critical habitat to resident species like the endangered Ridgway's rail and salt marsh harvest mouse.

The Don Edwards San Francisco Bay National Wildlife Refuge is part of a complex made up of six other wildlife refuges in the San Francisco Bay Area. Founded in 1974 and administered by the U.S. Fish and Wildlife Service, It was renamed Don Edwards San Francisco Bay National Wildlife Refuge in 1995 in recognition of Congressman Don Edwards' efforts to protect sensitive wetlands in south San Francisco Bay.

== Landmarks ==
=== Bayside Cannery ===
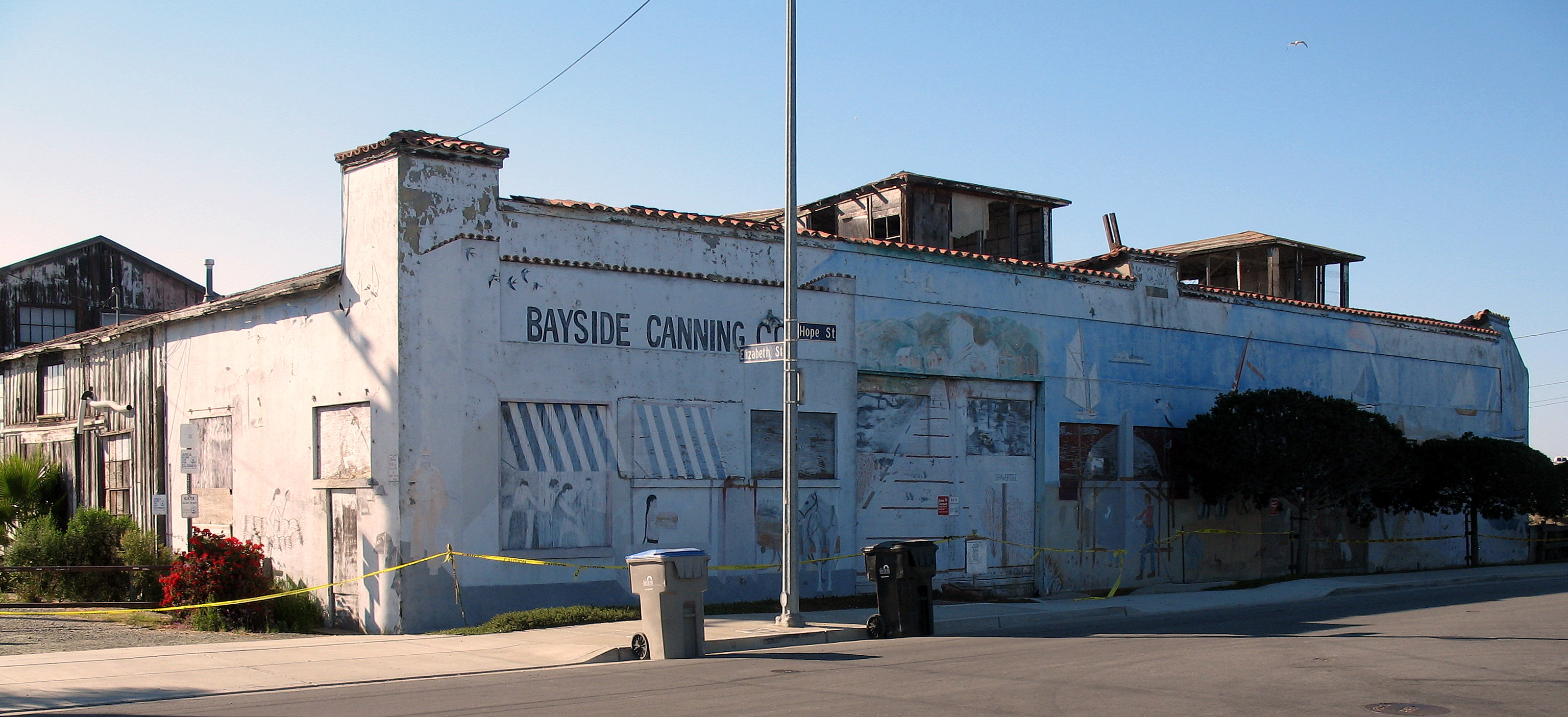
The historic Mission Revival style Bayside Cannery, built 1906

The Bayside Cannery is a historic Mission Revival style building in Alviso, built in 1906. Originally founded as the Precita Canning Co. in San Francisco, the cannery moved to Alviso following the 1906 San Francisco earthquake. Bayside Cannery grew to be the third largest canning company in the world, after Del Monte and Libby Cannery. It was closed in 1936 and the property is currently used by the San Francisco Bay Bird Observatory.

=== Laine Store ===
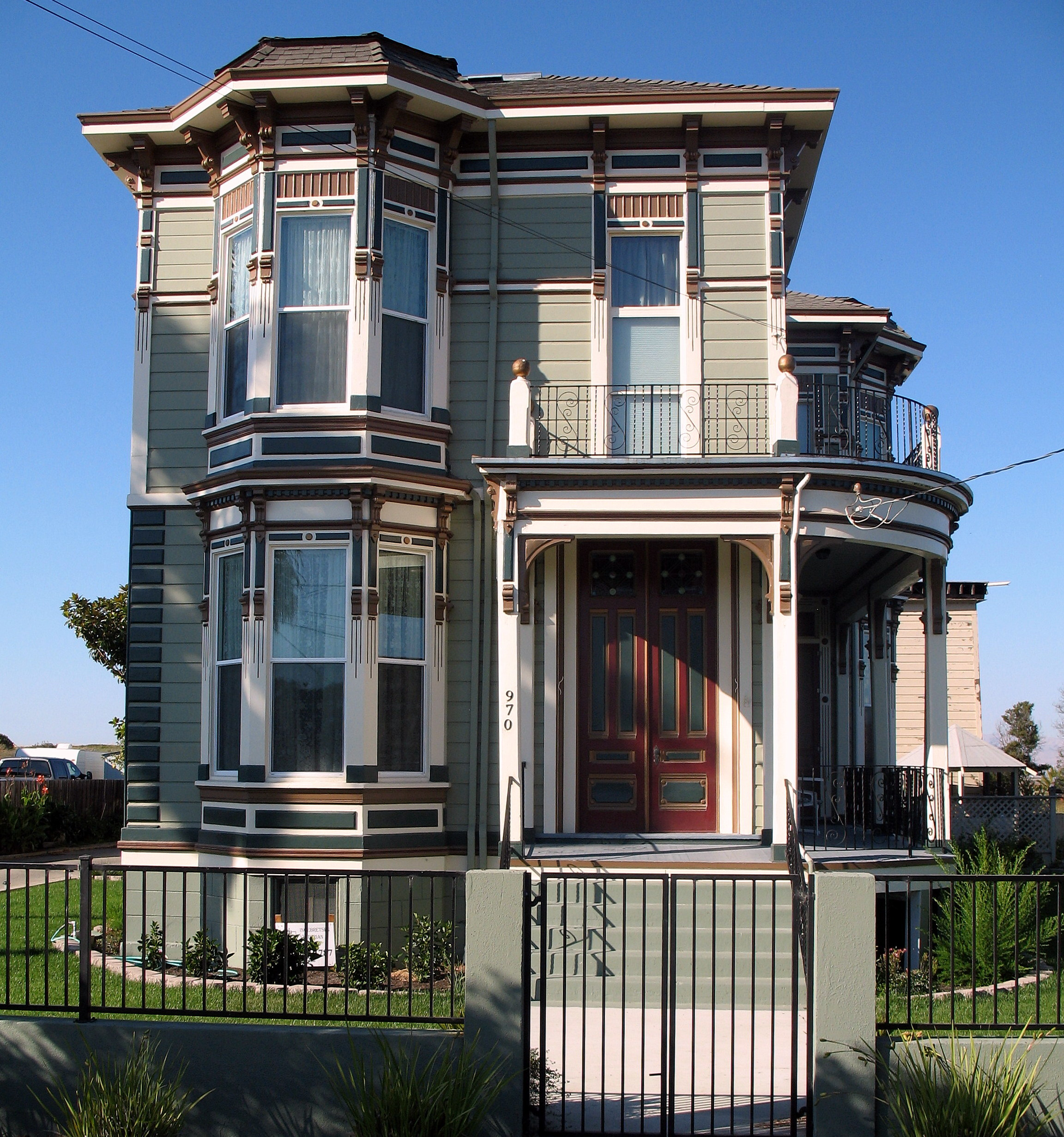
Tilden House, built 1887

The Laine Store at 996 Elizabeth Street was run by the Tilden family from 1865 to 1912. In the 1920s it became a Chinese gambling hall. After the 1983 flood, the store was abandoned and fell into disrepair. In 2017 it collapsed and the debris was removed.

=== Tilden–Laine House ===
An Italianate–Victorian home built in 1887 by Susan Tilden, and located on Elizabeth Street. The home is still occupied by the Laine family; Thomas Laine and Beverly Laine.

=== Wade Warehouse ===
The H. G. Wade Warehouse was built in 1860 and used for storage of grain and hay prior to shipment to San Francisco, and for Wells Fargo horse-drawn carriages. It was a City of San Jose historic landmark. It was destroyed by fire in June 2021.
