= Trout Creek (Los Gatos Creek tributary) =

Stream in California, US

- Location of mouth

Location
- Country: United States
- State: California
- Region: Santa Clara

Physical characteristics
- Source: El Sereno Summit in the Santa Cruz Mountains
  - coordinates: 37°12′56″N 122°1′20″W
  - elevation: 1,333 ft (406 m)
- Mouth: Los Gatos Creek
  - location: 1.7 mi (3 km) southeast of Los Gatos, California
  - coordinates: 37°12′14″N 121°59′24″W
  - elevation: 474 ft (144 m)
- Length: 9 mi (14 km)

Trout Creek is a 1.8-mile-long (2.9 km) southeastward-flowing stream originating in the Santa Cruz Mountains, a tributary of Los Gatos Creek in Santa Clara County, California. From its confluence with Los Gatos Creek, its waters flow to the Guadalupe River and thence through San Jose, California to south San Francisco Bay.

== History ==
Trout Creek is likely named for local steelhead trout (Oncorhynchus mykiss), and is one of over 25 named Trout Creeks in California.

== Watershed and course ==
Trout Creek begins southeast of and below the 2,526 feet (770 m) El Sereno Summit in El Sereno Open Space Preserve near the top of Montevina Road in the Santa Cruz Mountains. It joins lower Los Gatos Creek just below (north of) Leniham Dam on Lexington Reservoir.

== Ecology and conservation ==
Trout Creek could serve as an important wildlife linkage undercrossing to reduce wildlife-vehicle collisions on Highway 17. Trout Creek runs through protected San Jose Water District lands on the west side of the highway, and on the east side of the highway lie the conserved lands of St. Joseph's Hill Open Space Preserve.

== See also ==
- Lexington Reservoir
- Guadalupe River
