= Bear Creek Redwoods Open Space Preserve =

Protected area in California, US

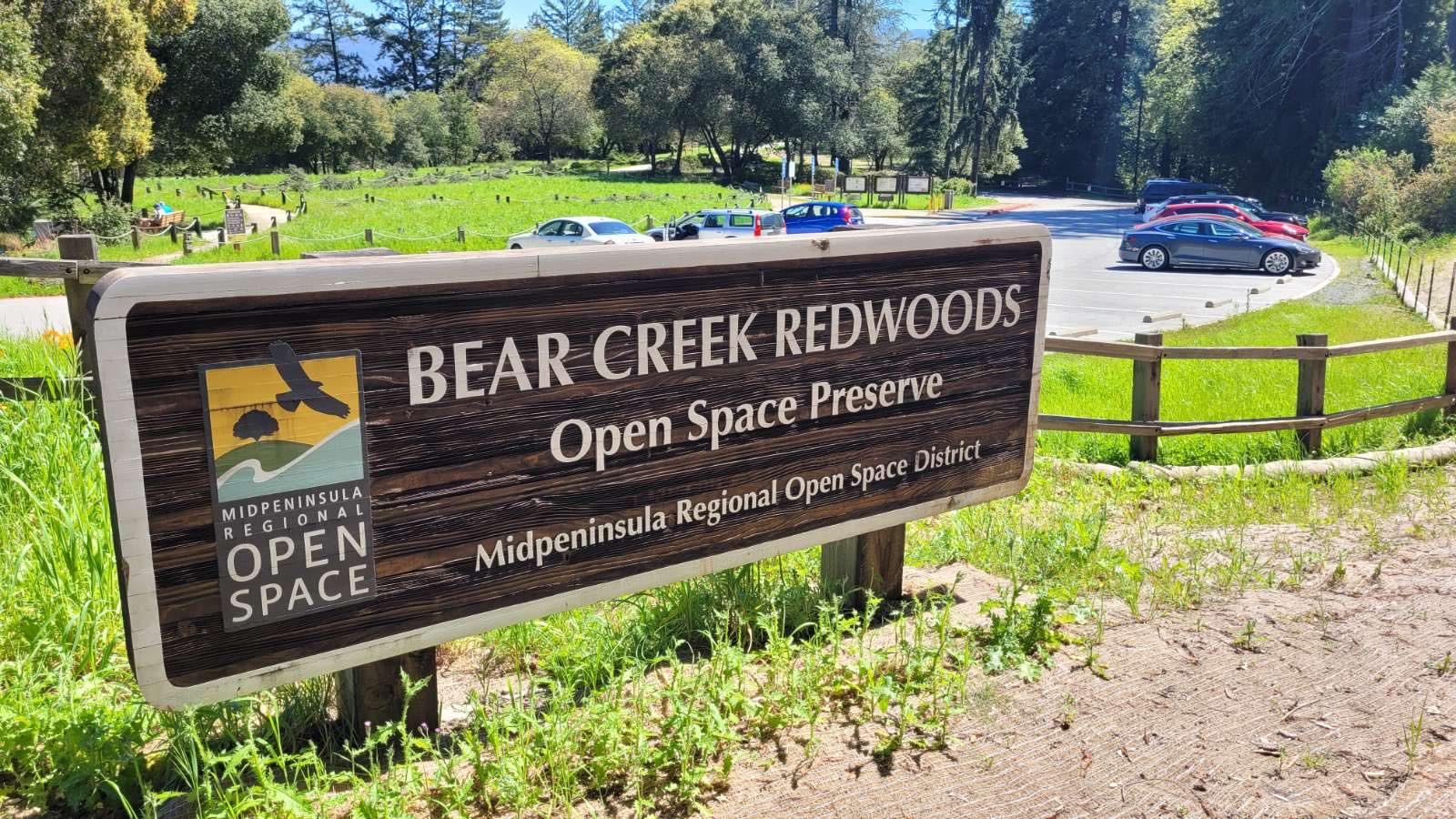

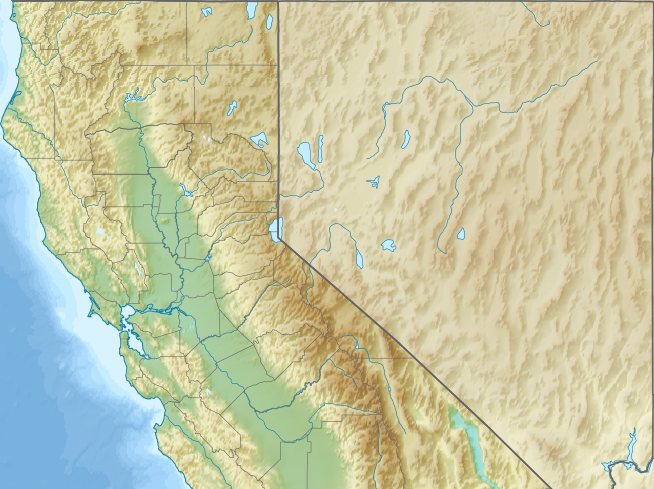
- Location within Northern California Location within California Location within the United States
- Location: Santa Clara County, California, United States
- Nearest city: Los Gatos, California
- Coordinates: 37°10′56″N 122°00′00″W
- Area: 1,432 acres (5.80 km^{2})
- Established: 2019
- Governing body: Midpeninsula Regional Open Space District

The Bear Creek Redwoods Open Space Preserve is a public open space preserve in Santa Clara County, California, United States, in the Santa Cruz Mountains. The preserve is located along both sides of Bear Creek Road, west of State Route 17 and Lexington Reservoir, and mostly north and east of the Skyline Boulevard and Summit Road sections of State Route 35. It surrounds the Presentation Center, a conference and retreat facility run by the Sisters of Presentation.

The preserve is owned and managed by the Midpeninsula Regional Open Space District. A first phase, including about 500 acres (200 ha) west of Bear Creek Road, was opened to the public on June 8, 2019. It includes six miles (9.7 km) of hiking and equestrian trails, a 52-space parking lot, and restrooms for visitors. The remainder of the preserve remains closed to the public, and will open in two additional phases – phase 2 between 2020 and 2026, and phase 3 after 2026.

== Ecology ==
The preserve is notable for its tall coast redwoods (Sequoia sempervirens), including several surviving old-growth trees over 200 feet tall and estimated to be 600 to 800 years old. In addition to coast redwood forest, the preserve includes Douglas fir forest and oak woodland.

Fauna include mountain lions, mule deer, coyotes, bobcats, song sparrows, mallard ducks, bullfrogs, western pond turtles, Townsend's big-eared bats, California myotis bats, Mexican free-tailed bats, Steller's jays, Santa Cruz black salamanders, California giant salamanders, red-shouldered hawks, belted kingfishers, and many migratory bird species.

Most of the preserve lies in the watersheds of Aldercroft Creek and Briggs Creek, tributaries of Los Gatos Creek which empty eastwards into Lexington Reservoir. The southwestern corner of the preserve reaches south of State Route 35 into the upper watershed of Zayante Creek, a tributary of the San Lorenzo River.

== History ==
Ohlone people lived in the region for thousands of years. There are several Ohlone rock mortars in the preserve. The Ohlone gathered acorns and grass seeds to make bread and porridge, and ground them into flour at milling stations on boulders and rock outcrops. Over generations the grinding wore deep holes, or mortars, into the stone. During the estate period, these boulders were moved from elsewhere on the property to a spot near the Upper Lake, where they remain.

The area was logged multiple times starting in the 1850s, although some old-growth trees survived.

In 1906 Harry Tevis, heir to a San Francisco mining fortune, built a 50-room mansion, gardens, and stables on a ridge top. Tevis died in 1931, and the site was acquired by the Sacred Heart Novitiate, a Jesuit order. From 1934 to 1969 Alma College, a Jesuit seminary, was located on the site of the Tevis mansion.

In February 1969, Alma College relocated to Berkeley to become one of the member schools of the Graduate Theological Union.

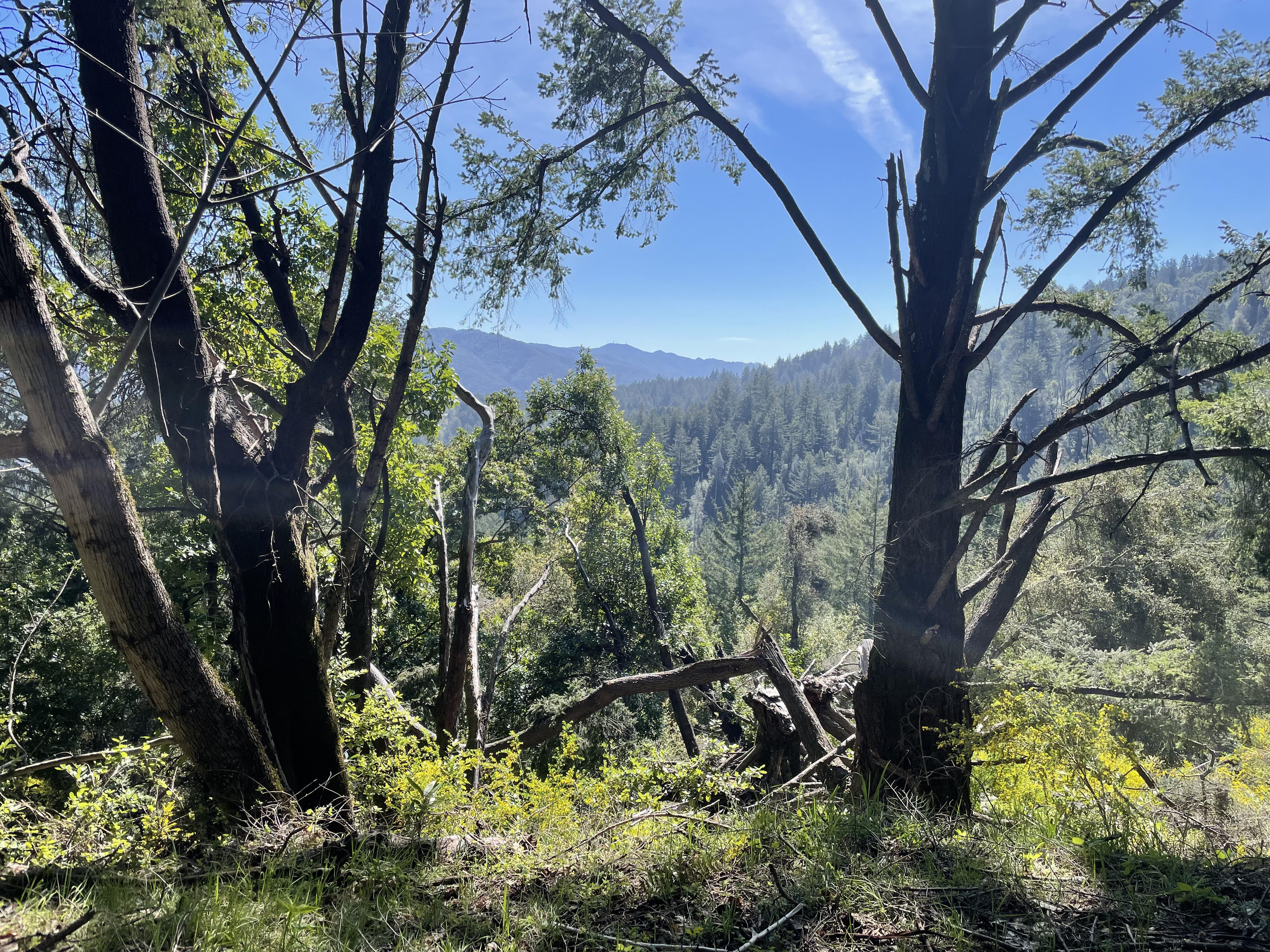

The original college buildings were heavily damaged by the Loma Prieta earthquake on October 17, 1989. That same year, the Jesuits sold the property for $12 million to Hong Kong Metro Realty, based in Madison, Wisconsin, and run by Dr. Jun Lee, nephew of Hong Kong casino billionaire Stanley Ho. Lee sold the land to Arlie Land and Cattle of Cottage Grove, Oregon, in December 1997 for more than $17 million.

In 1999, the Midpeninsula Regional Open Space District signed a contract to acquire the former college site, set on 1,071 acres (4.33 km^{2}) of wooded hillsides. The complex agreement, which the Board of Directors approved 7–0 at a March 10 meeting, was the costliest in the district's history and the first open space agreement that included potential development. Officials said it was the district's last chance to get the land, which it had been considering since 1975.

Under the deal, Midpeninsula agreed to pay $10.5 million for an option on the upper 811 acres (3.28 km^{2}), but the remaining 260 acres (1.1 km^{2}), on the lower property along Highway 17, was considered for possible development of a golf course and up to 50 luxury homes by Arlie Land and Cattle.

== Plans for the preserve ==
Midpeninsula dedicated funds from a 2014 open space bond to prepare the 1432-acre property for public use. In 2017 Midpeninsula completed the Bear Creek Redwoods Preserve Plan, a "long-term use and management plan for the preserve." The plan calls for habitat restoration, erosion control, preserving cultural and historic resources, and opening the preserve to the public in three phases. The first phase, including about 500 acres west of Bear Creek Road, opened to the public on June 8, 2019. Bond funds were used to build trails, a parking lot, restrooms, retaining walls, bridges, culverts, and a pedestrian crossing of Bear Creek Road.

The second phase, which includes the former college buildings and stables, will open to the public between 2020 and 2026. Midpeninsula plans to demolish most of the college buildings starting in 2020, except for the chapel and the library. The horse stables built in 1915 will be renovated. The third and final phase, south of the college and east of Bear Creek Road and Summit Road, will open to the public after 2026. The second and third phases will include another 15 miles (24 km) of trails, including a trail connection across Highway 17 to Lexington Reservoir County Park.

== See also ==
- Midpeninsula Regional Open Space District areas
- Coast redwood groves
