= Lexington Hills, California =

Lexington Hills
- census-designated place
- Location in Santa Clara County and the state of California

- Location in the United States
- Coordinates: 37°9′28″N 121°59′2″W
- Country: United States
- State: California
- County: Santa Clara

Area
  - Total: 4.753 sq mi (12.309 km^{2})
  - Land: 4.719 sq mi (12.221 km^{2})
  - Water: 0.034 sq mi (0.089 km^{2}) 0.72%
- Elevation: 1,250 ft (381 m)

Population (2020)
  - Total: 2,492
  - Density: 528.1/sq mi (203.9/km^{2})
- Time zone: UTC-8 (PST)
  - Summer (DST): UTC-7 (PDT)
- ZIP code: 95033
- Area codes: 408/669
- FIPS code: 06-41282
- GNIS feature ID: 1867036

Lexington Hills is a census-designated place and an unincorporated area in Santa Clara County, California, United States. The population was 2,492 at the 2020 census. The area is located in the Santa Cruz Mountains, about five miles south of Los Gatos and about 14 miles (23 km) north of Santa Cruz. Lexington Hills is the name assigned by the United States Census Bureau to the area, which actually comprises several small communities, including Redwood Estates, Holy City, Chemeketa Park, and Aldercroft Heights.

== Geography ==
Lexington Hills is located at 37°09′28″N 121°59′02″W.

According to the United States Census Bureau, the CDP has a total area of 4.7 square miles (12 km^{2}), of which 4.7 square miles (12 km^{2}) is land and 0.03 square miles (0.078 km^{2}) (0.72%) is water.

=== Climate ===
This region experiences warm (but not hot) and dry summers, with no average monthly temperatures above 71.6 °F. According to the Köppen Climate Classification system, Lexington Hills has a warm-summer Mediterranean climate, abbreviated "Csb" on climate maps.

== Demographics ==
Historical population
Census	Pop.	Note	%±
1990	2,064		—
2000	2,454		18.9%
2010	2,421		−1.3%
2020	2,492		2.9%

=== 2020 census ===
As of the 2020 census, Lexington Hills had a population of 2,492. The population density was 528.2 inhabitants per square mile (203.9/km^{2}). The median age was 46.9 years, with 20.9% of residents under the age of 18 and 17.4% aged 65 or older. For every 100 females, there were 102.8 males, and for every 100 females age 18 and over, there were 101.0 males age 18 and over.

The age distribution was 20.9% under the age of 18, 5.3% aged 18 to 24, 21.2% aged 25 to 44, 35.3% aged 45 to 64, and 17.4% who were 65 years of age or older.

The whole population lived in households. There were 952 households, out of which 31.5% included children under the age of 18, 62.7% were married-couple households, 6.1% were cohabiting couple households, 14.6% had a female householder with no spouse or partner present, and 16.6% had a male householder with no spouse or partner present. 20.9% of households were one person, and 8.3% were one person aged 65 or older. The average household size was 2.62. There were 691 families (72.6% of all households).

There were 1,017 housing units at an average density of 215.6 units per square mile (83.2 units/km^{2}), of which 952 (93.6%) were occupied. Of occupied units, 83.9% were owner-occupied and 16.1% were occupied by renters. Of all housing units, 6.4% were vacant. The homeowner vacancy rate was 0.6% and the rental vacancy rate was 7.5%.

0.0% of residents lived in urban areas, while 100.0% lived in rural areas.

Racial composition as of the 2020 census
Race	Number	Percent
White	1,958	78.6%
Black or African American	22	0.9%
American Indian and Alaska Native	17	0.7%
Asian	138	5.5%
Native Hawaiian and Other Pacific Islander	0	0.0%
Some other race	68	2.7%
Two or more races	289	11.6%
Hispanic or Latino (of any race)	225	9.0%

=== Income and poverty ===
In 2023, the US Census Bureau estimated that the median household income in 2023 was $245,000, and the per capita income was $113,384. About 3.0% of families and 2.7% of the population were below the poverty line.

=== 2010 census ===
The 2010 United States census reported that Lexington Hills had a population of 2,421. The population density was 513.0 inhabitants per square mile (198.1/km^{2}). The racial makeup of Lexington Hills was 2,148 (88.7%) White, 10 (0.4%) African American, 5 (0.2%) Native American, 90 (3.7%) Asian, 0 (0.0%) Pacific Islander, 59 (2.4%) from other races, and 109 (4.5%) from two or more races. Hispanic or Latino of any race were 193 persons (8.0%).

The Census reported that 2,413 people (99.7% of the population) lived in households, 8 (0.3%) lived in non-institutionalized group quarters, and 0 (0%) were institutionalized.

There were 946 households, out of which 321 (33.9%) had children under the age of 18 living in them, 559 (59.1%) were opposite-sex married couples living together, 52 (5.5%) had a female householder with no husband present, 42 (4.4%) had a male householder with no wife present. There were 55 (5.8%) unmarried opposite-sex partnerships, and 11 (1.2%) same-sex married couples or partnerships. 210 households (22.2%) were made up of individuals, and 51 (5.4%) had someone living alone who was 65 years of age or older. The average household size was 2.55. There were 653 families (69.0% of all households); the average family size was 2.99.

The population was spread out, with 539 people (22.3%) under the age of 18, 121 people (5.0%) aged 18 to 24, 558 people (23.0%) aged 25 to 44, 948 people (39.2%) aged 45 to 64, and 255 people (10.5%) who were 65 years of age or older. The median age was 44.8 years. For every 100 females, there were 105.9 males. For every 100 females age 18 and over, there were 101.9 males.

There were 996 housing units at an average density of 211.0 per square mile (81.5/km^{2}), of which 760 (80.3%) were owner-occupied, and 186 (19.7%) were occupied by renters. The homeowner vacancy rate was 1.3%; the rental vacancy rate was 2.6%. 2,026 people (83.7% of the population) lived in owner-occupied housing units and 387 people (16.0%) lived in rental housing units.

=== Census county division ===
Lexington Hills is also the name of a wider unincorporated census county division (CCD) located on the eastern side of the Santa Cruz Mountains in west Santa Clara County, California. The area covers approximately 54 square miles (140 km^{2}), much of it open space, and contains Lake Elsman, Lexington, and Williams reservoirs, as well as the Lexington Reservoir County Park and Bear Creek Redwoods and Sierra Azul open space preserves. The Lexington Hills communities, as well as the former Almaden Air Force Station on Mount Umunhum, and Loma Prieta (highest peak in the Santa Cruz Mountains) are also located in the area.

As of the 2020 census, the population of the CCD was 4,185 residents of whom 75.1% were non-Hispanic white, 10.0% Hispanic, 6.3% Asian, and 8.5% of other races, with a median age of 46.8 years old.

Most residents and businesses in the area use postal zip codes from the Lexington Hills CDP, the neighboring city of Los Gatos and the adjoining San Jose neighborhood of Almaden Valley. The telephone area code is 408.

== Government ==
In the California State Legislature, Lexington Hills is in the 15th senatorial district, represented by Democrat Dave Cortese, and in the 28th Assembly district, represented by Democrat Gail Pellerin.

In the United States House of Representatives, Lexington Hills is in California's 16th congressional district, represented by Democrat Sam Liccardo.

== Education ==
Most of the CDP is in Los Gatos Union Elementary School District. A portion is in Loma Prieta Joint Union Elementary School District. All of it is in Los Gatos-Saratoga Joint Union School District.
