= Redwood Estates, California =

Unincorporated community in California, United States

The Redwood Estates Post Office is a gathering place

Redwood Estates is a rural unincorporated community along State Route 17 in the coastal Santa Cruz Mountains in Los Gatos, California, United States. The Census Bureau includes it in a census-designated place named Lexington Hills. It lies inside the confines of Santa Clara County. The area is about eight miles from downtown Los Gatos and nine miles from the Santa Cruz County community of Scotts Valley.

Nearby Summit Road is roughly the dividing line between the counties: Santa Cruz County areas being generally west of Summit Rd. The Butano Fault (also known as the Butano Rift Zone), roughly follows Summit Road through the area. The ZIP code for post office boxes in Redwood Estates is 95044, although the city and ZIP code for street delivery is Los Gatos, 95033. Street addresses are usually five digits. The U.S. Geological Survey, National Geographic Names Database, lists the NAD27 coordinates of the community as 37°09′23″N 121°59′08″W. The community is inside area code 408 while communities further west (but outside Redwood Estates) are in the coastal area code 831.

The architecture of homes in the community varies widely. The roads are paved, but narrow and winding when compared to modern urban streets. While area housing prices have been buoyed by rising real estate prices in Silicon Valley, the area is quiet and informal. There are few lawns: most homes have redwood duff in the front yard. Poison oak is evident in the area. There are very few storm drains, curbs, or sidewalks. Roads are framed by vegetation and wind along the contours of the area's hills. As the name implies, the area is populated by the towering redwood trees ubiquitous to the occasionally fog-shrouded areas of the California coast. Redwood roots seem to serve as informal speed bumps on many of the narrow community roads.

Business occupancies in the community include: Nonnos Italian Cafe, 21433 Broadway; Redwood Estates Store, 20121 Broadway; San Jose Water Co., Santa Clara County Fire Department Redwood Station at 21452 Madrone Dr.; and the Redwood Estates Post Office. A traffic focal point is the SR17 interchange with Madrone Drive. Summit Road has an interchange with SR17 and approximates the southern extent of the community.

The area has a history with ties to railroading. Until the 1940s, a Southern Pacific Railroad line to Santa Cruz passed through Holy City east of Redwood Estates. A factor in the removal of the rail line was its high maintenance cost. The portals of three tunnels along this line were closed during World War II in case an invading military force might use them as cover.

== Nearby ==
Other nearby mountain communities include Chemeketa Park, Aldercroft Heights, and Zayante. Previous communities include the ghost towns Holy City and Wrights (also known as Wrights Station).

Moody Gulch oil field, an abandoned field, is north of Redwood Estates. There are roughly twenty plugged wells, some with buried well heads, in the area. Moody Gulch extends in an arc east to Chemeketa Park north of the street named Apache Trail. One well is shown on the 7.5-minute quadrangle at 37°09′39″N 121°59′26″W (NAD83). The oil field is named for Moody Gulch, a creek tributary to Los Gatos Creek.

== Climate ==
This region experiences warm (but not hot) and dry summers, with no average monthly temperatures above 71.6 °F. According to the Köppen Climate Classification system, Redwood Estates has a warm-summer Mediterranean climate, abbreviated "Csb" on climate maps.
