= Lexington, California =

- Ghost town
- Location within the state of California Lexington (San Francisco Bay Area) Lexington (the United States)
- Coordinates: 37°11′47″N 121°59′18″W
- Country: United States
- State: California
- County: Santa Clara
- Elevation: 620 ft (190 m)
- Time zone: UTC-8 (Pacific (PST))
  - Summer (DST): UTC-7 (PDT)
- GNIS feature ID: 1670812

Lexington is a ghost town in Santa Clara County, California, United States, now submerged by the Lexington Reservoir. Originally located along Los Gatos Creek, the town was 550 feet above sea level.

Lexington started out as a sawmill built in 1848 by Isaac Branham and Julian Jank. Zachariah "Buffalo" Jones bought the mill for $3000 and laid out a town called "Jones Mill". In 1860, John P. Hennings bought some of the property and changed the name to Lexington, after his hometown of Lexington, Kentucky.

Lexington was a stop on the stagecoach route from Los Gatos to Santa Cruz. In the 1860s, the sawmills moved up into the hills and Lexington began to decline in importance. In 1880, a narrow gauge railroad from Los Gatos to Santa Cruz was completed, bypassing Lexington and accelerating its decline; its post office had already been transferred to Alma, a mile south, where the trains stopped and which was the transfer point to stagecoaches until the line was completed.

The railroad ceased operations in March 1940, following major damage by a winter storm and the completion of State Route 17 that same year. When the Lexington Reservoir was created in 1952, both Lexington and Alma were officially abandoned and SR 17 was rerouted to its present location. The visible ruins under Lexington Reservoir are actually those of Alma, not Lexington; building foundations and original pavements of roads are sometimes visible during droughts.

The nearby unincorporated town of Lexington Hills is a reminder of the former town; it combines several villages in the Santa Cruz Mountains.

The Lexington Murders was one of the most notable crimes in California during the 19th century. Three men were responsible for the brutal murders of William Peter Renowden and Archibald McIntyre in Lexington, on March 11, 1883.
