= Alma, California =

Alma
- Ghost town
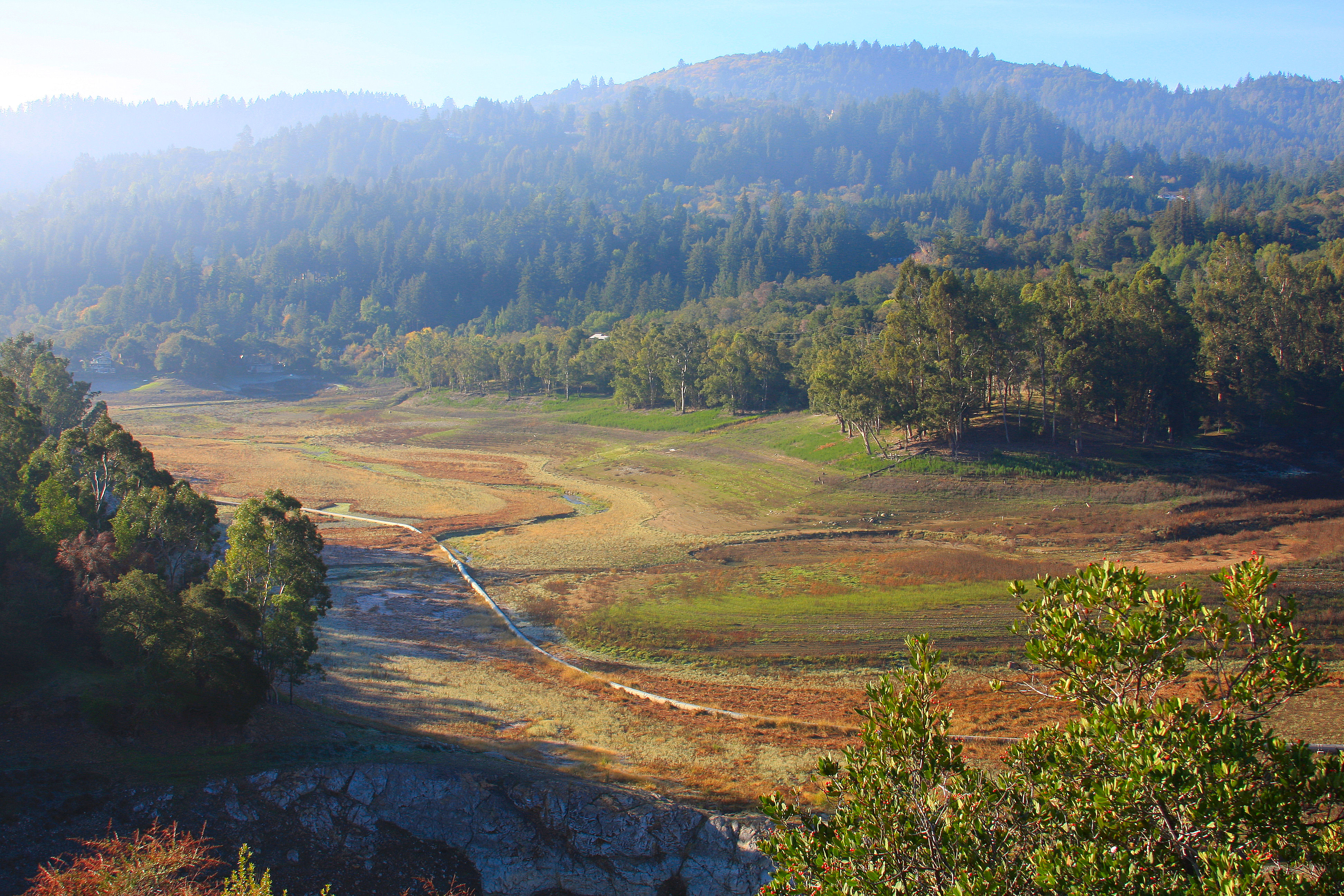
- Lexington Reservoir at low water, the former site of Alma as it appeared in 2008.

- Location within the state of California
- Coordinates: 37°10′48″N 121°58′48″W
- Country: United States
- State: California
- County: Santa Clara
- Time zone: UTC-8 (Pacific (PST))
  - Summer (DST): UTC-7 (PDT)

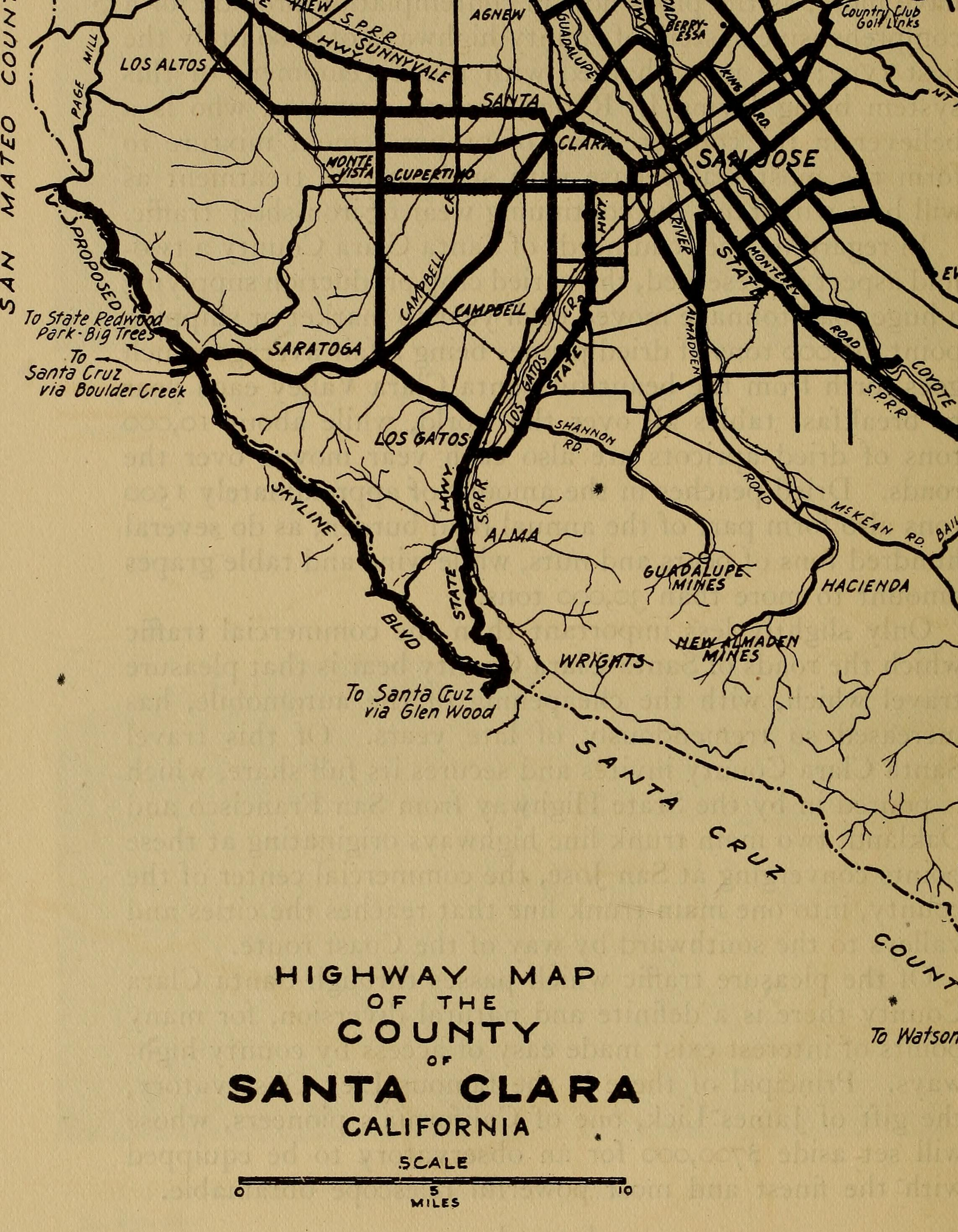
Location of Alma, about 5 miles south of Los Gatos, on the 1920s highway map of Santa Clara county

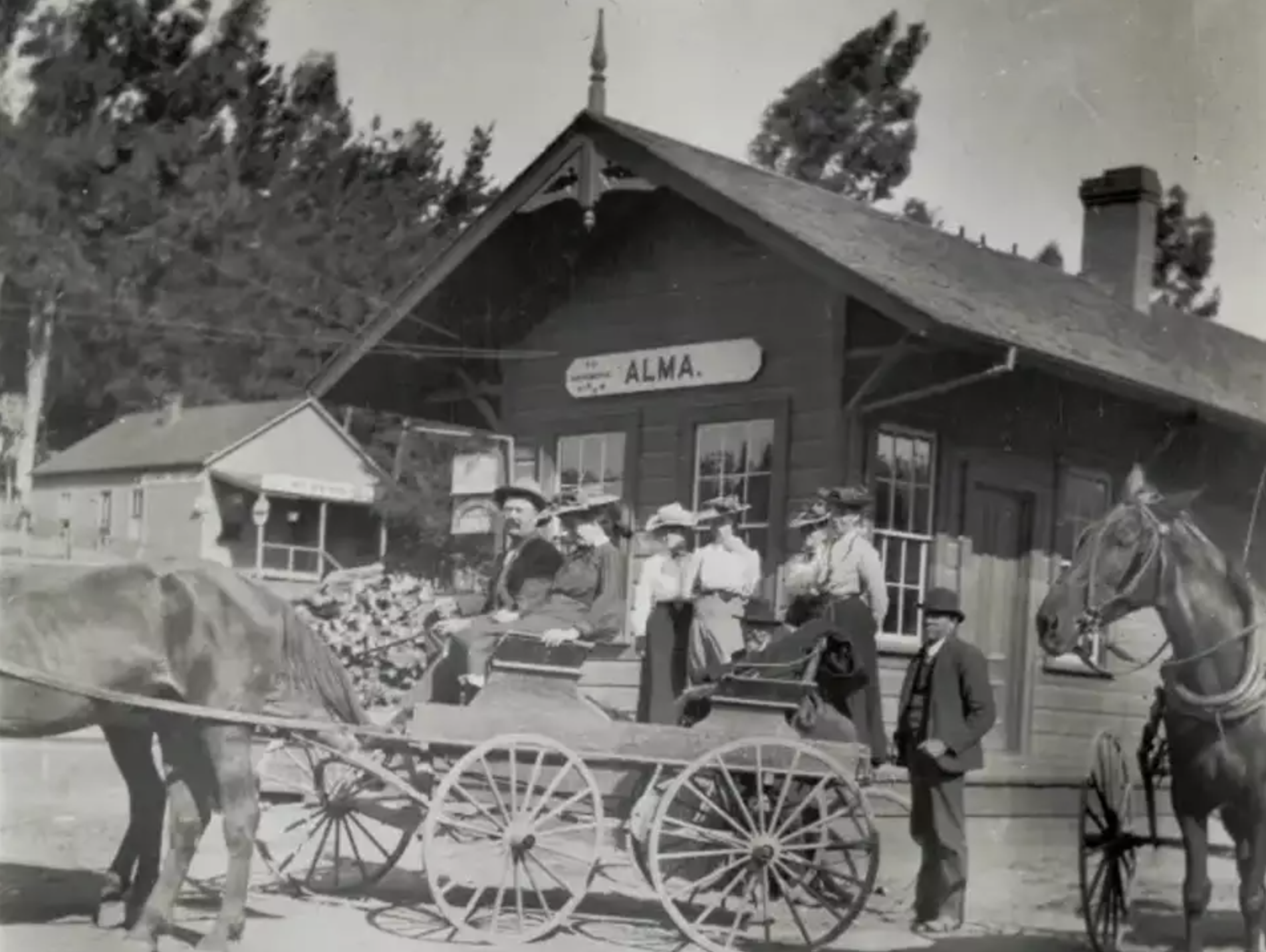
Alma train station (c. 1890) in Alma, California

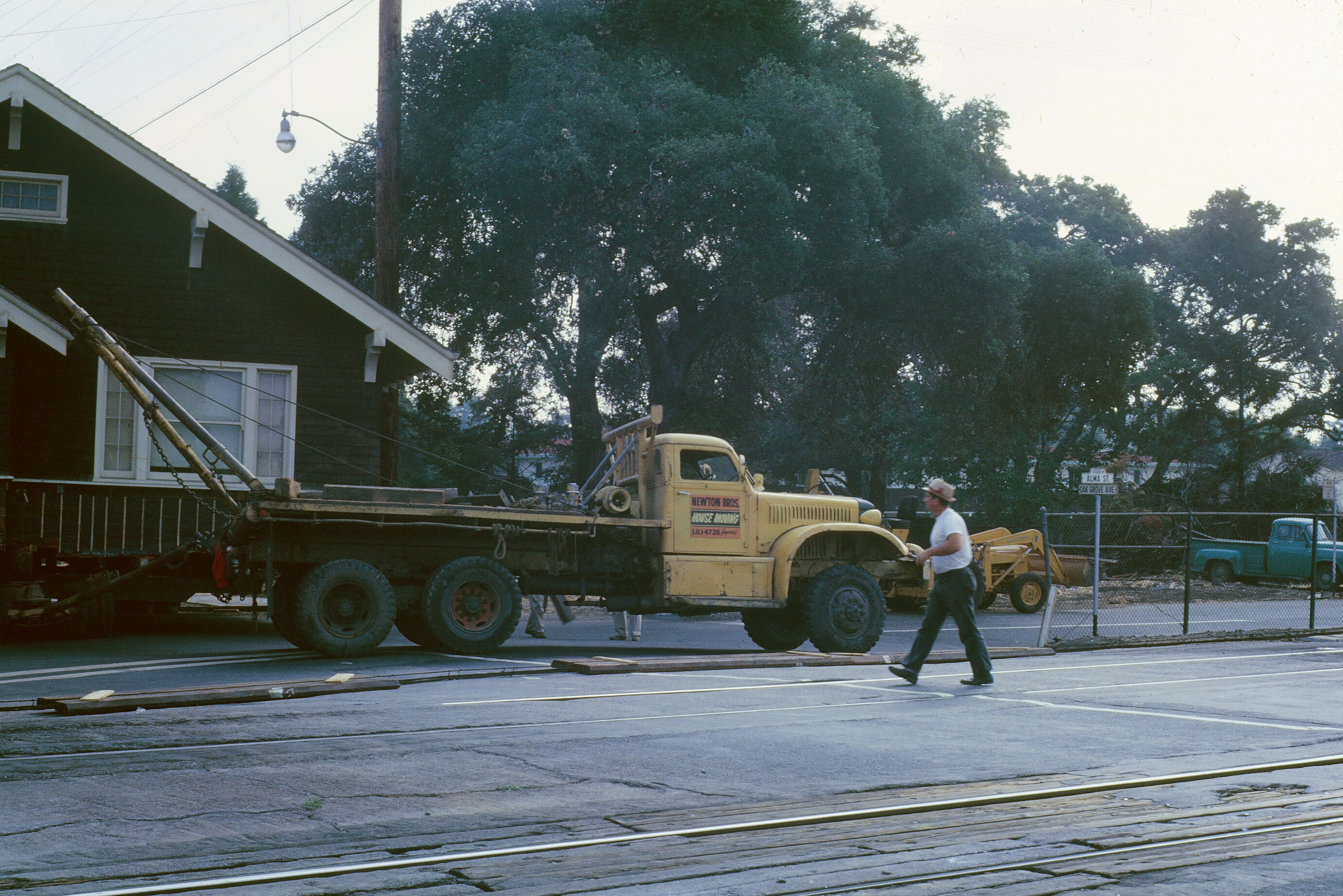
House from Alma being moved to Menlo Park, California, July 1962

Alma is a ghost town and drowned town in Santa Clara County in California, United States. It lies beneath the waters of the Lexington Reservoir above Los Gatos. The location is latitude 37.18N and longitude 121.98W. It was 551 feet (168 meters) above sea level.

There are two different possible origins for the name of the town. The first is that the town was the location of a branch road that led to the New Almaden mine. The second, and more fanciful, origin is that the town was named after a local prostitute. The original town name registered with the Postal Service in 1861 was Lexington. It was re-registered as Alma in 1873.

The town was mostly demolished when the James J. Lenihan Dam was constructed there in 1952. Alma, at the time, had a population of fewer than 100 people. The town was an important rail stop for the logging industry in the Santa Cruz Mountains as well as a stop for vacationers heading to the coast from the Santa Clara Valley. Just north of Alma was the town of Lexington, which had greatly declined by the time that dam and reservoir were constructed.

Alma had a stage stop, hotel, saloons, small agricultural operations, general merchandise store, and lumber mills, as well as other establishments. The South Pacific Coast Railroad served Alma between 1880 and 1940, providing service between Los Gatos and Santa Cruz via Wrights, also known as Wrights Station or Wright's Station.

Some foundational structures are only visible when the water levels drop in the reservoir, and some old roads and a bridge dating from 1926. The bridge can only be viewed when the water level is unusually low, such as the summer of 2008 when construction on the dam lowered the water level to 7% capacity. Modern day State Route 17 passes by the reservoir—beneath which lie the former towns of Lexington and Alma.

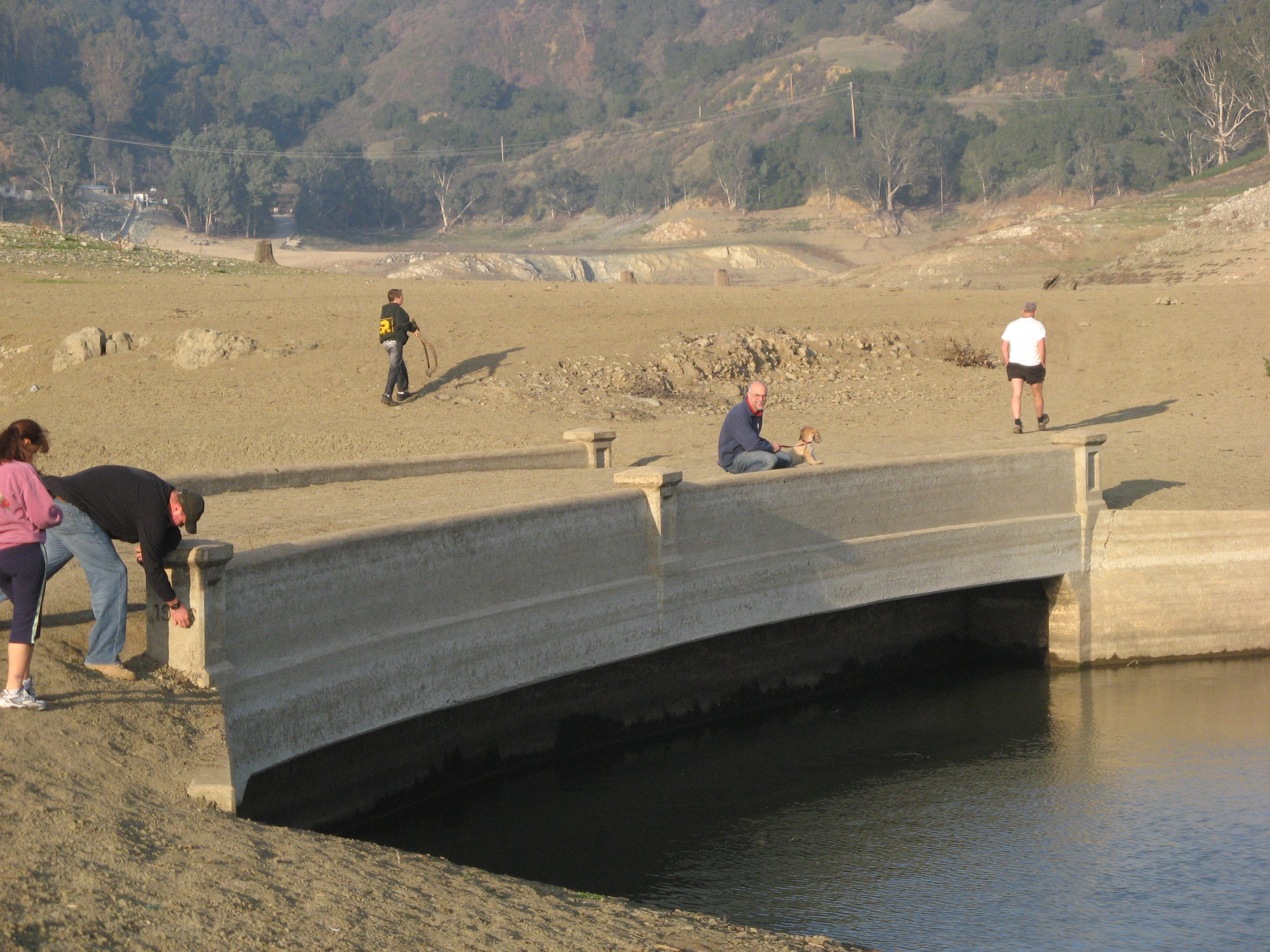
A sunken bridge across Black Creek, which was exposed during the pipe replacement project (2008).

A U.S. Weather Bureau cooperative weather station in Alma reported average annual rainfall of 22.60 inches (574 millimeters).

== Alma Helitack Base ==
CAL FIRE operates one of its 11 helitack bases near the site of the former town. Alma Helitack Base houses one helicopter and one fire engine.

== Alma College ==
Alma College was located west of Alma on Alma College Road, above the Lexington Reservoir, at latitude 371056N, longitude 122000W; decimal degrees: latitude 37.18222, longitude -122.00111.

The college was a Jesuit seminary which opened in 1934. Located in the foothills south of Los Gatos, it was founded to serve the needs of two Jesuit provinces, California and Oregon.

In February 1969, the school relocated to Berkeley to become one of the member schools of the Graduate Theological Union and placing it in close proximity to the University of California. The board of trustees voted to change the name of Alma College to the Jesuit School of Theology at Berkeley in June 1969.

Today, the Jesuit School is one of only two Jesuit theological centers in the United States operated by the Society of Jesus. The school intends to be "an international center for the culturally contextualized study of theology and ministry," and admits students from all over the world.

The Jesuit School is accredited by the Western Association of Schools and Colleges, the American Association of Theological Schools, and by the Vatican Congregation of Catholic Education as an Ecclesiastical Faculty of Theology.

The original college buildings were heavily damaged by the Loma Prieta earthquake on October 17, 1989. That same year, the Jesuits sold the property for $12 million to Hong Kong Metro Realty, based in Madison, Wisconsin, and run by Dr. Jun Lee, nephew of Hong Kong casino billionaire Stanley Ho. Lee sold the land to Arlie Land and Cattle of Cottage Grove, Oregon in December 1997 for more than $17 million.

The triangular-shaped lower parcel lies between Highway 17 and Bear Creek Road. The irregularly-shaped upper parcels lie on both sides of Bear Creek Road and surround the Presentation Center, a conference and retreat facility run by the Sisters of Presentation. The western portions of the upper parcels are crossed by a network of trails and roads built by the Jesuits, while the southern parcel is the steepest and most heavily wooded part of the land and can't be easily accessed. The two upper parcels stretch nearly to the Santa Cruz County line.

In 1999, the Mid-peninsula Regional Open Space District signed a contract to acquire the former college site, set on 1,071 acres (4.33 km^{2}) of wooded hillsides. The complex agreement, which the Board of Directors approved 7–0 at a March 10 meeting, was the costliest in the district's history and the first open space agreement that included potential development. Officials said it was the district's last chance to get the land, which it had been considering since 1975.

Under the deal, Mid-peninsula agreed to pay $10.5 million for an option on the upper 811 acres (3.28 km^{2}), but the remaining 260 acres (1.1 km^{2}), on the lower property along Highway 17, was considered for possible development of a golf course and up to 50 luxury homes by Arlie Land and Cattle.

Although the property was heavily logged in the late nineteenth century, the district said it is one of the largest and finest second-growth redwood forests remaining in the county. Some redwoods on the property are believed to be 800 to 900 years old.

Mid-peninsula dedicated funds from a 2014 open space bond to prepare the 1432-acre property for public use. It was renamed Bear Creek Redwoods Open Space Preserve, and a first phase, including about 500 acres lying west of Bear Creek Road, was opened to the public on June 8, 2019. Bond funds were used to build trails, a parking lot, restrooms, retaining walls, bridges, and culverts. The second phase, which includes the former college buildings, will open to the public between 2020 and 2026. Mid-peninsula plans to demolish most of the college buildings starting in 2020, except for the chapel and the library. Horse stables built in 1915 will be renovated. The third and final phase, south of the college and east of Bear Creek Road and Summit Road, will open to the public after 2026.
