= Los Gatos Creek (Santa Clara County) =

Los Gatos Creek Arroyo de Los Gatos, Jones Creek
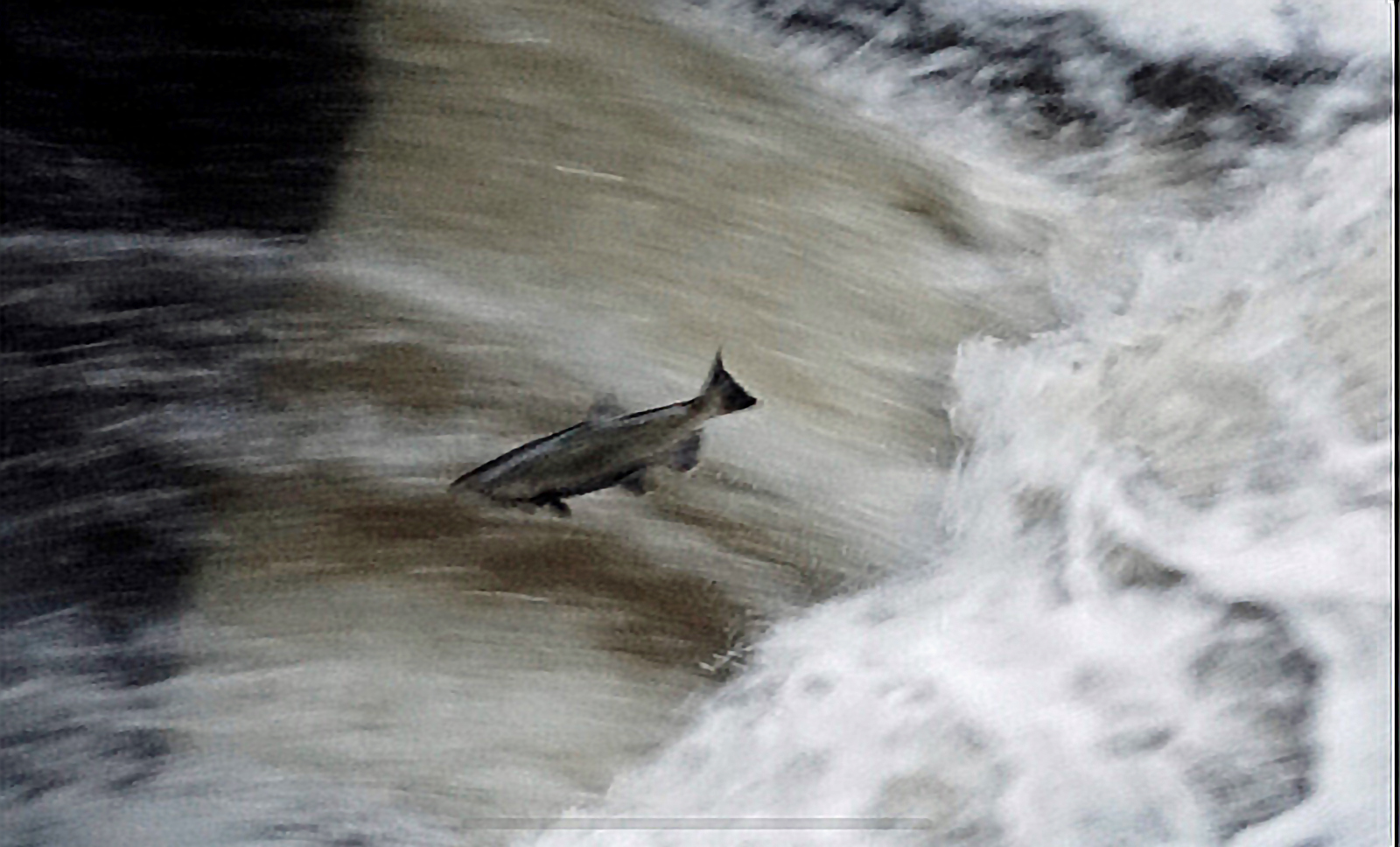
- Chinook salmon leaping passage barrier on Los Gatos Creek in December 2018

- Location of the mouth of Los Gatos Creek in California

Location
- Country: United States
- State: California
- Region: Santa Clara County
- Cities: Los Gatos, Campbell, San Jose, Holy City, Chemeketa Park

Physical characteristics
- Source: Loma Prieta Mountain in the Santa Cruz Mountains
  - coordinates: 37°06′36″N 121°50′48″W
  - elevation: 3,250 ft (990 m)
- Mouth: Guadalupe River
  - location: San Jose, California
  - coordinates: 37°00′02″N 121°53′57″W
  - elevation: 69 ft (21 m)

Basin features
- Tributaries
  - left: Moody Gulch, Aldercroft Creek, Briggs Creek, Black Creek, Lyndon Canyon Creek, Trout Creek
  - right: Austrian Gulch, Hooker Gulch Creek, Hendrys Creek, Soda Springs Creek, Limekiln Canyon Creek, Dry Creek

The Los Gatos Creek runs 24 miles (39 km) in California through Santa Clara Valley Water District's Guadalupe Watershed from the Santa Cruz Mountains northward through the Santa Clara Valley until its confluence with the Guadalupe River in downtown San Jose. The Guadalupe River then continues onward into San Francisco Bay.

The creek begins in the Santa Cruz mountains near the Santa Clara/Santa Cruz County border, just south of the peak Loma Prieta. It then flows northwesterly to Lake Elsman, a reservoir owned by the San Jose Water Company, then on to Holy City and Chemeketa Park, then northward into the Lexington Reservoir. The creek then flows through the Los Gatos Canyon and through the town of Los Gatos and Vasona Reservoir, then northeasterly through Campbell and San Jose where it meets the Guadalupe River.

== History ==
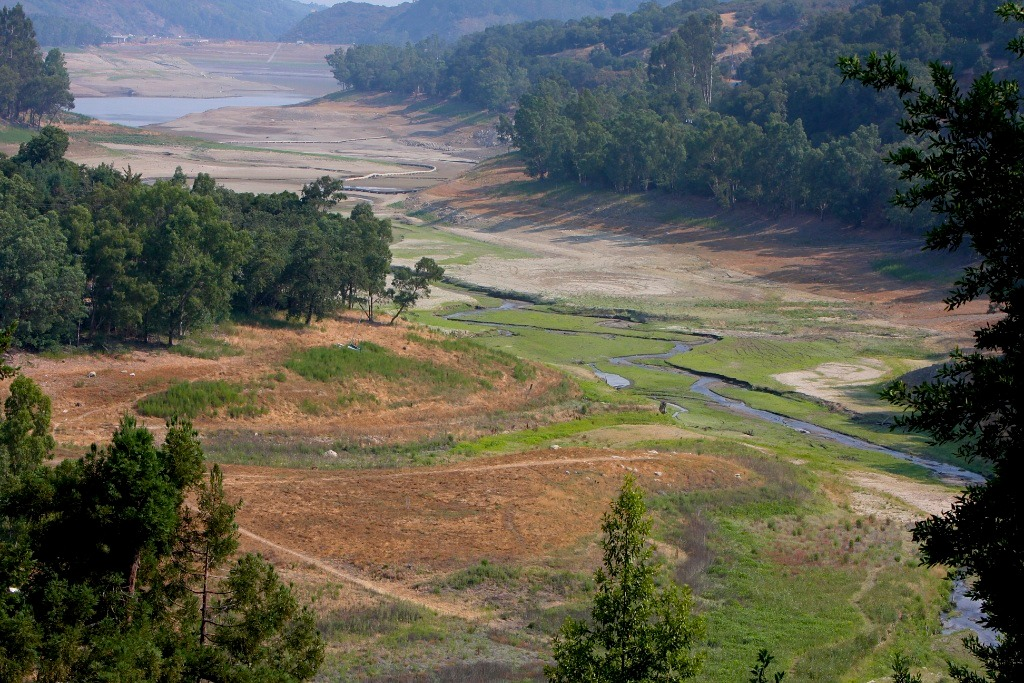
Upper Los Gatos Creek confluence with Lexington Reservoir

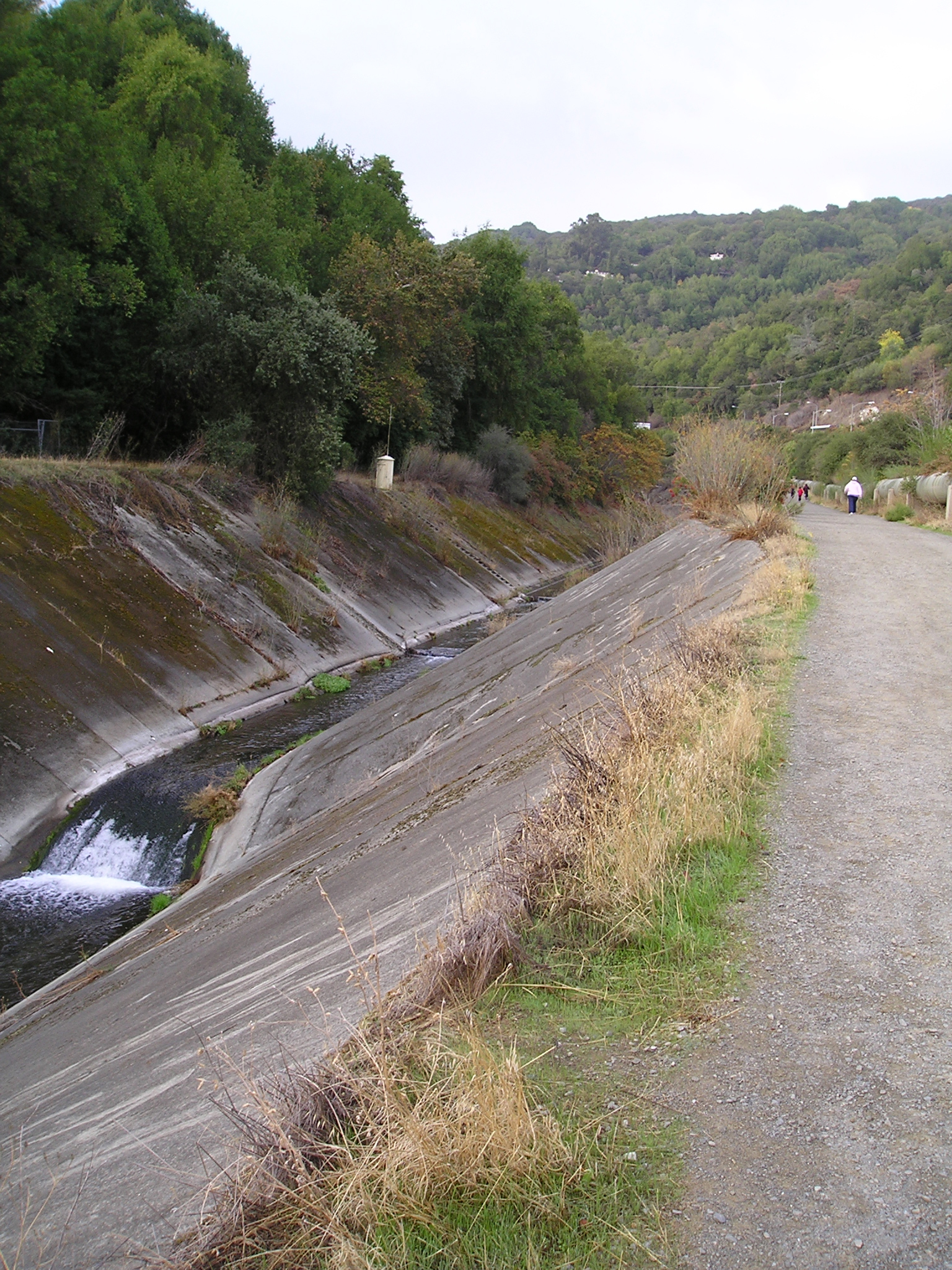
Between Lexington Reservoir and downtown Los Gatos, the creek runs in a deep concrete culvert alongside the Los Gatos Creek Trail

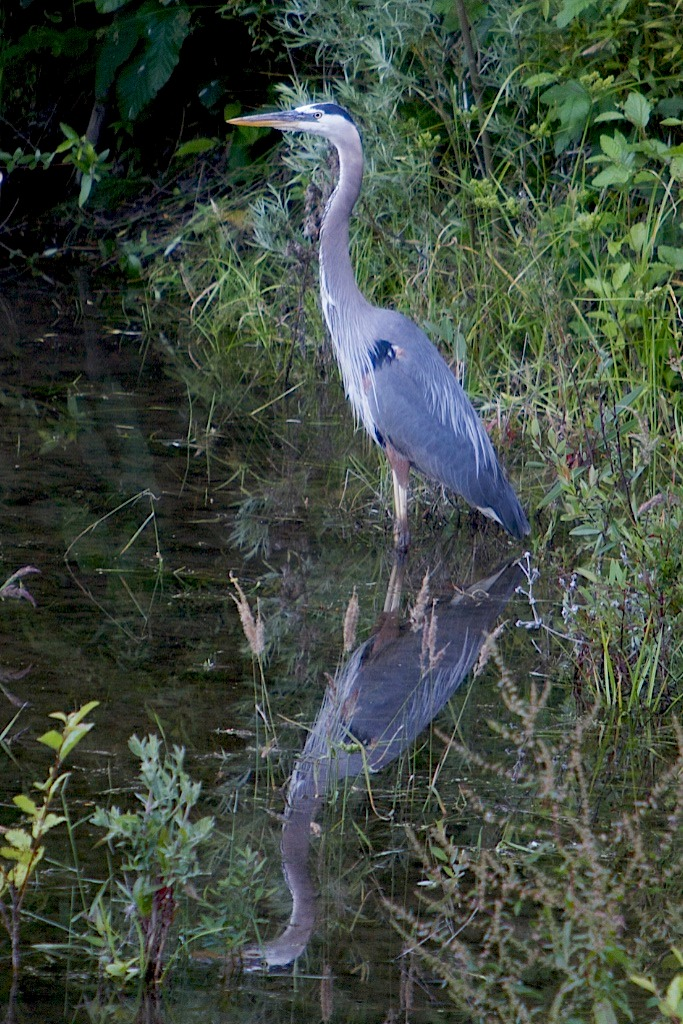
Great blue heron reflected in Los Gatos Creek

The creek was named after the Alta California land grant Rancho Rinconada de Los Gatos ("Corner of the Cats"), which itself was named for the cougars and/or bobcats that roam in the mountains above the present-day town of Los Gatos. The first settlers, a Spanish family arriving in 1839, were scouting for a homestead in the area when they heard mountain lions roaring and fighting. While frightened, they also recognized it was a good omen, for it meant water couldn't be far away. They discovered the creek and built a home in what is now Vasona Lake County Park. On Hare's 1872 map the creek was called Arroyo de Los Gatos and Zachariah Jones called it Jones Creek at the time he laid out the town he called Jones Mill (which later became the now submerged Lexington, California). Forbes Mill was established by James Forbes along the creek in the 1850s; the town of Los Gatos was subsequently built around the mill.

In 1866, extreme flooding of the Los Gatos Creek caused it to naturally cut a new channel in what is now the Willow Glen neighborhood of San Jose, running west and north of its original channel. The reshaped creek left behind a dry creek bed, known as Dry Creek. Today's Dry Creek Road runs parallel to the creek bed.

The construction of State Route 17 in the 1950s forced much of the creek through Los Gatos to be diverted into a concrete gulch. As a Caltrans magazine from the era describes it: "Included in this project is a relocation of Los Gatos Creek for a distance of 6,000 feet, requiring a concrete line channel." The Los Gatos Daily Times on Aug. 31, 1954, reported that "bulldozers have virtually completed clearing and leveling the bed of Los Gatos Creek, and preparations are readied for laying the concrete culvert."

Also in the 1950s, the construction of the James J. Lenihan Dam formed Lexington Reservoir, which flooded much of a small valley above Los Gatos, including the former townsites of Lexington and Alma. The dam and reservoir were completed in 1952, forcing the rerouting of Highway 17. When the reservoir's water level is low, the concrete bed of the old highway through those towns can be seen, along with foundations from some buildings. In spite of these events, much of the creek maintains its natural course and beauty.

Below Vasona Park, Los Gatos Creek feeds percolation ponds that are part of the groundwater recharge system built by the Santa Clara Valley Water District. North of Lark Avenue, one can also see a structure resembling a fountain, where imported water from other reservoirs is also added to Los Gatos Creek for recharge. In the 1920s, people discovered that Santa Clara Valley was sinking because of groundwater pumping. San Jose's elevation subsided 13 feet from 1910 to 1970s, correlated with a 250 feet decline in the underground water table. The valley's aquifers were also in danger of being ruined by saltwater infiltration. Local reservoirs were built to provide water for an aggressive groundwater recharge program. While simultaneously dealing with the demands of growing cities, the water district finally managed to stop further sinking by the 1980s. Vasona and Lexington reservoirs were part of the effort.

== Habitat and wildlife ==
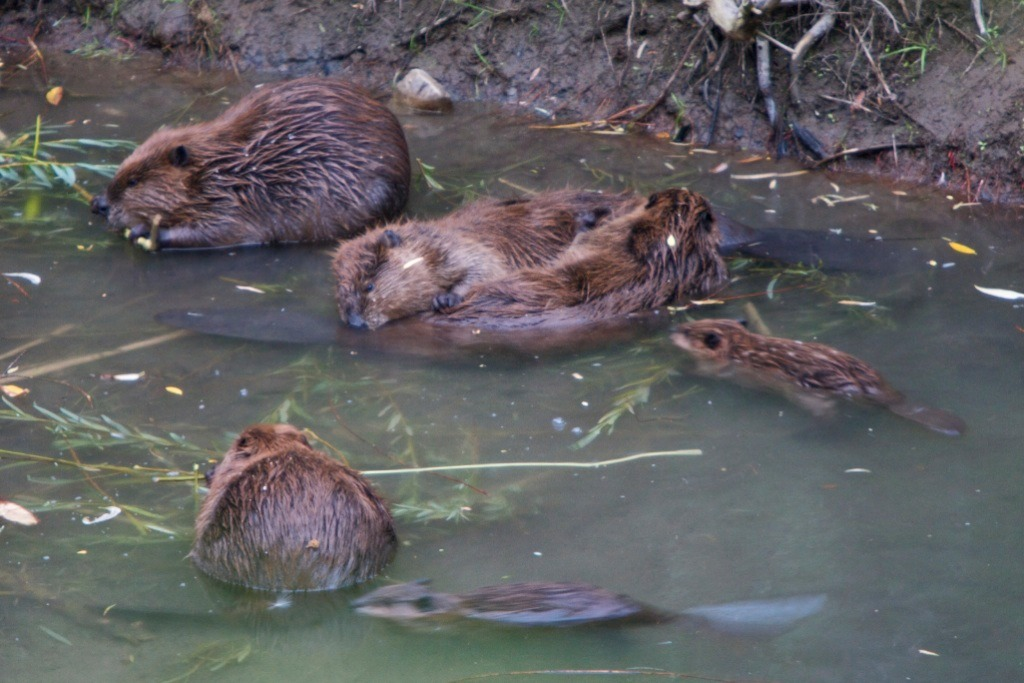
California golden beaver family on upper Los Gatos Creek

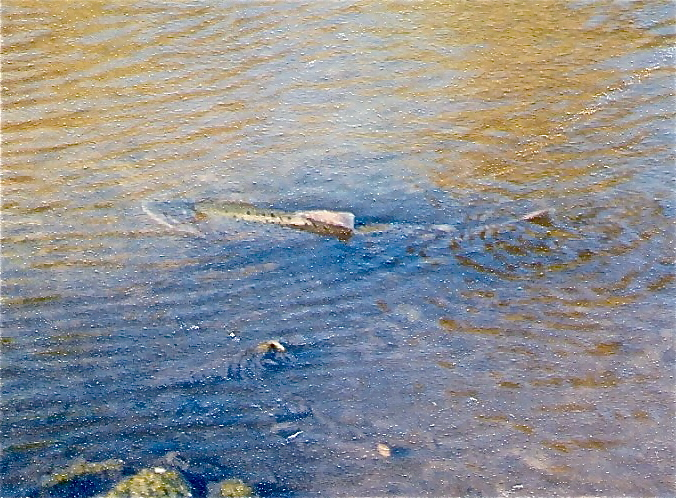
Chinook salmon spawning on Los Gatos Creek in 1996 by U. S. Highway 17.

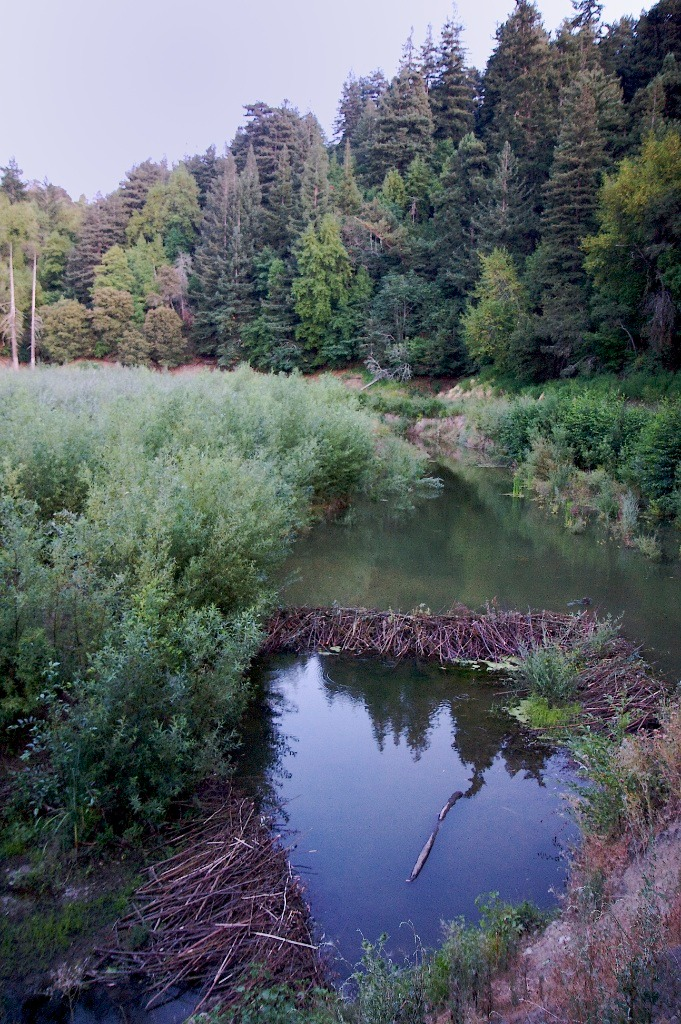
Beaver dams on upper Los Gatos Creek. Note dead conifer(s) reflected in pool and in background are critical for cavity-nesting birds like wood ducks, American kestrels, mergansers, Pacific-slope flycatchers, tree swallows, owls, etc.

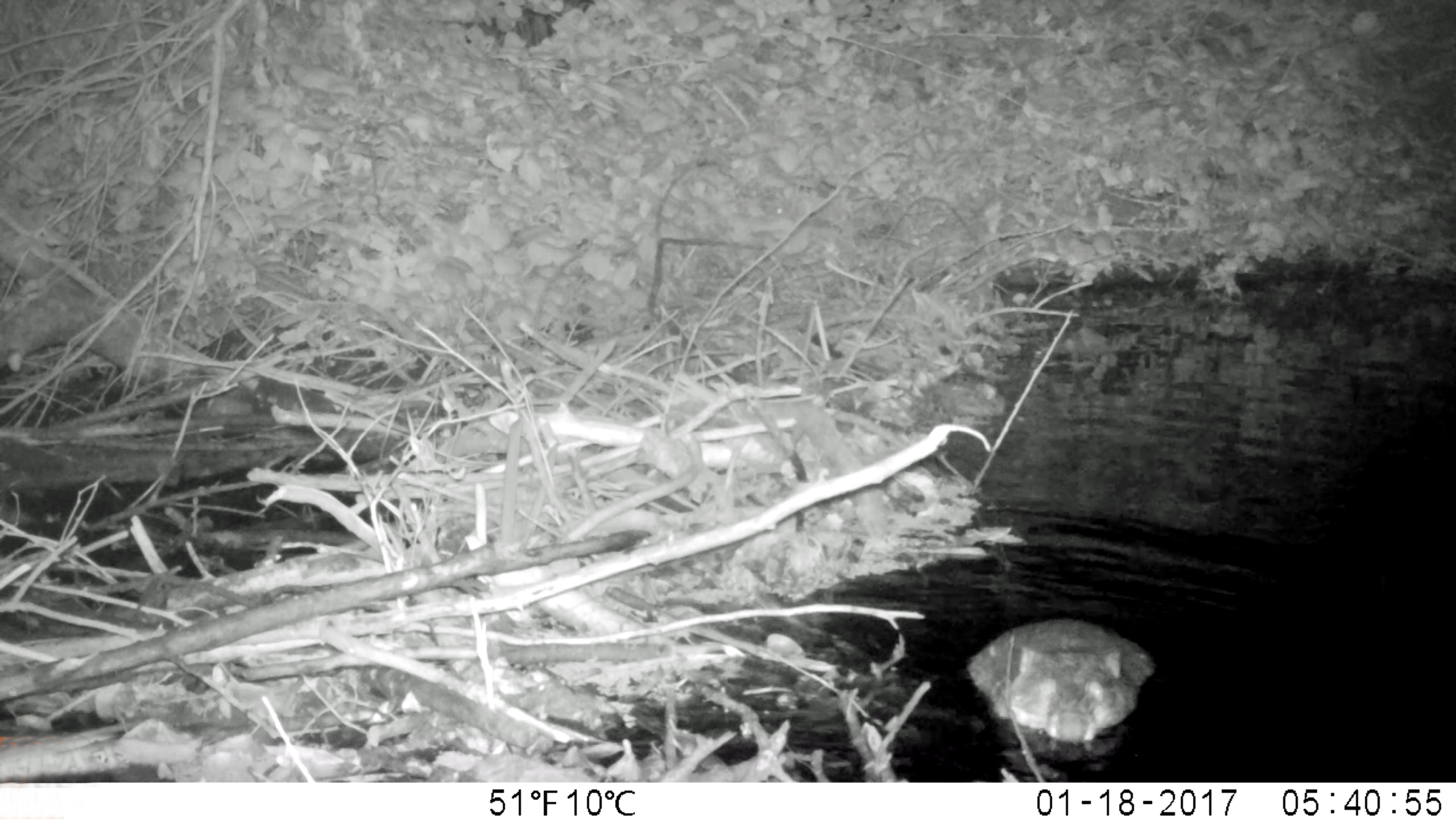
Beaver and dam on lower Los Gatos Creek, tributary to the Guadalupe River, courtesy of South Bay Clean Creeks Coalition.

Only five fish species were documented historically in the Guadalupe River watershed including rainbow trout, Sacramento sucker, roach, prickly sculpin, and three-spined stickleback (in brackish ponds and sloughs near the bay). As of 1931, there was a small natural spawning population of trout in select Santa Clara County streams, and it was believed the population was nearly extinct. A 1952 California Department of Fish and Game document stated that substantial steelhead runs had not been seen in Los Gatos Creek since 1937, when agricultural pumps lowered the water table throughout the Santa Clara Valley and dewatered the lower reach. However, Central California Coast steelhead/rainbow trout populations remain in the portions of the watershed today.

Today, Chinook salmon (Oncorhynchus tshawytscha) migrate up the Guadalupe River and Los Gatos Creek from San Francisco Bay. Both Chinook and steelhead have been spotted as far up the creek as Hamilton Avenue (see inset photo). Chinook salmon arrived in the Guadalupe River watershed (which includes Los Gatos Creek) as Central Valley hatchery strays in the 1980s. While a 1992-1994 genetic study of 29 fish claimed that some had haplotypes not found in Central Valley wild or hatchery salmon, but found in the Russian River, it was later determined that the methodology used was insufficient and provided inaccurate results. Chinook salmon in the Guadalupe River are closely related to Central Valley fall-run Chinook with a genetic affinity to the Feather River hatchery and genetically differentiated from coastal populations.

Between Lake Elsman and Lexington Reservoir, the creek is pristine and closed to the public. Here, along with rainbow trout, beaver, bobcats (Lynx rufus), wild boar (Sus scrofa) and puma (Puma concolor) are extant. The beaver were restocked to the portion of Los Gatos Creek where it enters Lexington Reservoir sometime before spring 1992, and recently, a beaver reportedly served as "a hearty meal" for a local mountain lion. Historical evidence of beaver in the area includes reference by Captain John Sutter who around 1840 recorded that 1,500 beaver pelts were sold "at a trifling value" by the Indians to Mission San José, the latter only 25 miles from the town of Los Gatos. Physical proof of golden beaver in south San Francisco Bay tributaries is a Castor canadensis subauratus skull in the Smithsonian Institution National Museum of Natural History collected by zoologist James Graham Cooper in Santa Clara, California on Dec. 31, 1855. Cooper lived in Mountain View, California from October to December 1855 and collected most of his specimens on Saratoga Creek (then "Quito Creek").

Osprey (Pandion haliaetus) began to re-colonize the watershed after at least a 150-year absence with documentation of nesting sites in 2004.

== Watershed ==
The Los Gatos Creek sub watershed drains 55.1 square miles (143 km^{2}). Los Gatos Creek originates at 2,350 feet (720 m) on Loma Prieta Mountain in the Santa Cruz Mountains and flows west to the minor Williams Reservoir above Lake Elsman (also a reservoir formed by Austrian Dam), where it is joined from the north by Austrian Gulch. Its next named tributaries are Hooker Gulch Creek, Moody Gulch and Hendrys Creek, also joining from the north, before Los Gatos Creek enters Lexington Reservoir. In Lexington Reservoir the next tributaries (left) are Aldercroft Creek and Briggs Creek (left), and by the more major Soda Springs Creek (right), then Black Creek (left), Lyndon Creek (left) and Limekiln Creek (right). Below Lexington Dam Los Gatos Creek flows northeast and is joined immediately by Trout Creek (left) then, north of Blossom Hill Road, it flows into Vasona Reservoir in Los Gatos, which is formed by Vasona Dam. In Willow Glen Los Gatos Creek is joined by Dry Creek (left) then, after crossing Interstate 280, El Camino Real and The Alameda, it joins the Guadalupe River in the Guadalupe River Park.

== Recreation ==
The Los Gatos Creek Trail runs along the river from Lexington Reservoir to the western portion of downtown San Jose via the main trail segment and a shorter northern segment and is popular among local hikers and bicyclists. In Los Gatos, Vasona Reservoir is another reservoir along the creek located in Vasona Park, one of the most popular parks in the Santa Clara County parks system. The Los Gatos Creek Park is located in Campbell, a city that is bisected by Los Gatos Creek.

== See also ==
- List of watercourses in the San Francisco Bay Area
