= Rebecca Eisenberg =

American lawyer

Rebecca Lynn Eisenberg
- Born: 1968 (age 57–58); Milwaukee, Wisconsin, U.S.
- Education: Stanford University (BA); Harvard Law School (JD)
- Occupations: columnist, commentator, attorney
- Writing career
- Pen name: Netskink; NouveauGeek
- Period: 1992–2007
- Genre: non-fiction
- Subjects: technology, business

Rebecca Lynn Eisenberg (born 1968) is an American technology writer, lawyer, entrepreneur, and columnist who covered the 1995–2001 Internet boom in San Francisco, California and Silicon Valley. She was elected to the Santa Clara Valley Water District Board of Directors in 2022.

== Biography ==
Eisenberg graduated Phi Beta Kappa with a BA in Psychology from Stanford University in 1990, and earned a JD cum laude from Harvard Law School in 1993, where she was an editor of the Harvard Law Review.

Beginning in 1995 Eisenberg was founder, general counsel, business development executive, and/or early employee of a number of notable dot-com start-up companies including Cyborganic (the online community founded by HotWired founder Jonathan Steuer), Ecast Network, (which makes a touch screen jukebox used in bars) and PayPal. Having joined as the second lawyer at the company, Eisenberg was the senior counsel at PayPal for almost six years. Eisenberg became the general counsel of Internet Ad Network startup AdBrite, Inc. from March, 2007 through September, 2008, and she served on the board of directors of the Craigslist Foundation (the nonprofit charitable wing of Craigslist) from its inception through late 2007. She was concurrently general counsel of Pure Digital Technologies, the maker of the handheld Flip Video camcorders, from September 2007 until fall of the following year. While at Pure Digital, she handled the successful merger of the company with Cisco Systems, Inc., for more than $600 million.

While providing advisory services to start-ups like The Skinny Scoop, Eisenberg was also the general counsel of the Sequoia Capital-backed real estate search site Trulia. Eisenberg joined the social news website Reddit in May 2012, where she continues to be the general counsel. She is active in nonprofits, including serving on the board of directors of Legal Momentum, formerly known as the National Organization for Women Legal Defense and Education Fund. She previously contributed to the Silicon Valley Moms Blog, and she continues to handle legal and strategic matters for certain private individuals and companies. She was also a 2020 candidate for the Palo Alto City Council, running on an economic justice and progressive values platform.

Eisenberg currently serves on the Santa Clara Valley Water District as a director, representing District 7.

In 2024, Eisenberg was censured by the Santa Clara Valley Water District Board of Directors for various complaints (agenda item 2.5) including the Director's selection of secure storage pertaining to paper reports provided to her by the district (the district wanted to control the secure storage while Eisenberg wanted to control the secure storage) and alleged (agenda item 2.4) discriminatory harassment in that the Director had accused men of ruining the natural world by building too much from concrete.

Eisenberg disputed the findings, calling the investigation a "sham" and characterizing it as an effort to "tone police" her which is a feminist characterization of the underlying issues at play, and said it was retaliation for her raising concerns about sexism at the agency and for her criticism of the Pacheco Dam project.

The censure also concerned Eisenberg’s continued retention of potentially confidential investigation reports provided by the District to Eisenberg for review and preparation of a response to the investigation. Valley Water sued Eisenberg in Santa Clara County Superior Court seeking return of the reports. In December 2025, the California Court of Appeal for the Sixth Appellate District affirmed a preliminary injunction requiring Eisenberg to return the paper printouts she had stored in a secure vault.

The local news reported that Eisenberg admitted taking the printed paper reports but argued the reports were necessary as a reference to allow responding to ongoing new district claims, that only the executive summaries were labeled confidential, that they were stored in a secure location, and that the district retained master digital copies.

== Select columns, articles, appearances, and blogs ==
Starting in 1995 Eisenberg wrote one of the earliest blogs called "Read Me." She continued until 2000, at which time she signed off, explaining she had found "a life." The term "blog" had not yet been coined. It was known at the time as an "online diary." In 1999 she was ranked as one of the 25 most important women on the web for her contributions to technology journalism.

Other writings include:

- "NouveauGeek" column, MarketWatch, 1998–2001
- "NetSkink" column, San Francisco Examiner, 1997–1999
- Numerous articles in print, video, and online editions of the San Francisco Chronicle, Upside, Ms. Magazine, ZDTV, Entertainment Weekly, Wired, Fast Company, PBS, the Red Herring, and Bitch
- Moderated, lectured, and hosted various technology and business-related events including the Digital Be-In, Geekapalooza, 415Tech, and the Electric Minds conference (sponsored by Howard Rheingold's famous start-up of the same name)
