= Santa Clara Valley Water District =

Water district overview
- Formed: 1968
- Preceding agencies: Santa Clara Valley Water Conservation District; Santa Clara County Flood Control and Water Conservation District
- Headquarters: San Jose, California
- Water district executive: Rick Callender, Chief Executive Officer
- Website: www.valleywater.org

The Santa Clara Valley Water District (also known as Valley Water) provides stream stewardship, wholesale water supply and flood protection for Santa Clara County, California, in the southern San Francisco Bay Area.

The district encompasses all of the county's 1,300 square miles (3,400 km^{2}) and serves the area's 15 cities, 2 million residents and more than 200,000 commuters. In terms of acres, the district includes 138,000 acres, and 120,700 of those acres are lands that people have built cities, roads or cultivate farms on. Almost 2,000 pumping wells supply the districts fields, houses and businesses with a clean reliable source of water. The water district has about 150 miles of pipelines and operates 10 dams and reservoirs, three treatment plants, many groundwater recharge basins, three pump stations and an advanced water purification plant. The district's three water treatment plants can produce as much as 210,000,000 US gallons (800,000 m^{3}) of drinking water a day.

== Facilities ==
=== Water Supply ===
The water that supplies the Santa Clara Valley Water District comes from various locations. Some of it comes from snowpack melt miles away. This water is brought to the county through the many infrastructure projects in California, including the Federal Central Valley Project. Santa Clara county also gets some of its water from recycled water. This water is purified to remove impurities and is used in multiple areas such as in agriculture. Santa Clara Water District has historically extracted water from under the ground in aquifers as well. Alluvial aquifers are the source of this ground water.

=== Purification ===
The district treats wastewater in stages. Solids are removed first, followed by the disinfection of water using ozone. After that, microscopic particles are eliminated and the ultimate step involves disinfection with chlorine. Chlorine kills organisms that may have survived the previous water purification stages, and helps prevent contamination from other organism after the stages are complete and while the water is transported.

=== Watersheds ===
There are five major watersheds in the Santa Clara Valley Water District. They include the Coyote Watershed, Guadalupe Watershed, Lower Peninsula Watershed, Uvas-Llagas Watershed, and West Valley Watershed.

- Coyote Watershed - This is Santa Clara Valley Water District's largest watershed and is approximately 322 square miles. The Penitencia Water Treatment Plant is located in this watershed and provides 270,000 customers with drinkable water.
- Guadalupe Watershed - This watershed holds the Lexington Reservoir and is approximately 170 square miles.
- Lower Peninsula Watershed - This watershed is approximately 98 square miles.
- Uvas-Llagas Watershed - This watershed is approximately 104 square miles.
- West Valley Watershed - This watershed is approximately 85 square miles.

=== Dams ===
The district owns many dams, including:

- Almaden Dam (on Alamitos Creek)
- Calero Dam (forms Calero Reservoir on Arroyo Calero)
- Coyote Dam (forms Coyote Lake on Coyote Creek)
- Coyote Percolation Dam (on Coyote Creek)
- Elmer J. Chesbro Dam (on Llagas Creek)
- Guadalupe Dam (forms Guadalupe Reservoir on Guadalupe Creek)
- James J. Lenihan Dam (forms Lexington Reservoir on Los Gatos Creek)
- Leroy Anderson Dam (on Coyote Creek and Las Animas Creek)
- Rinconada Reservoir (a drinking water reservoir associated with Rinconada Water Treatment Plant, not on a stream)
- Stevens Creek Dam (on Stevens Creek)
- Uvas Dam (on Uvas Creek)
- Vasona Percolation Dam (on Los Gatos Creek)

== Challenges ==
=== Water over-extraction ===
Over the years people have over-extracted the district's groundwater causing problems. In 1916-1934 there was a drought due to lack of rainfall; this coupled with excessive water withdrawal dropped the average water level in wells in the Santa Clara Water District by 108 feet. Excessive water consumption over many years has led to groundwater drops of more than 200 feet in some areas. When water levels in these aquifers drop below their threshold, compaction causes the aquifer to not store as much water as it originally did before overextraction. This causes further issues as there is less available water to meet the needs of the people, farm and ecosystems that rely on this water. This also led to land subsidence up to 12.7 feet between the 60-year gap from 1900 to the 1960s. Meaning that not only did water levels sink, but the ground surface sank, or subsided, too.

=== Climate Change Adaptation ===
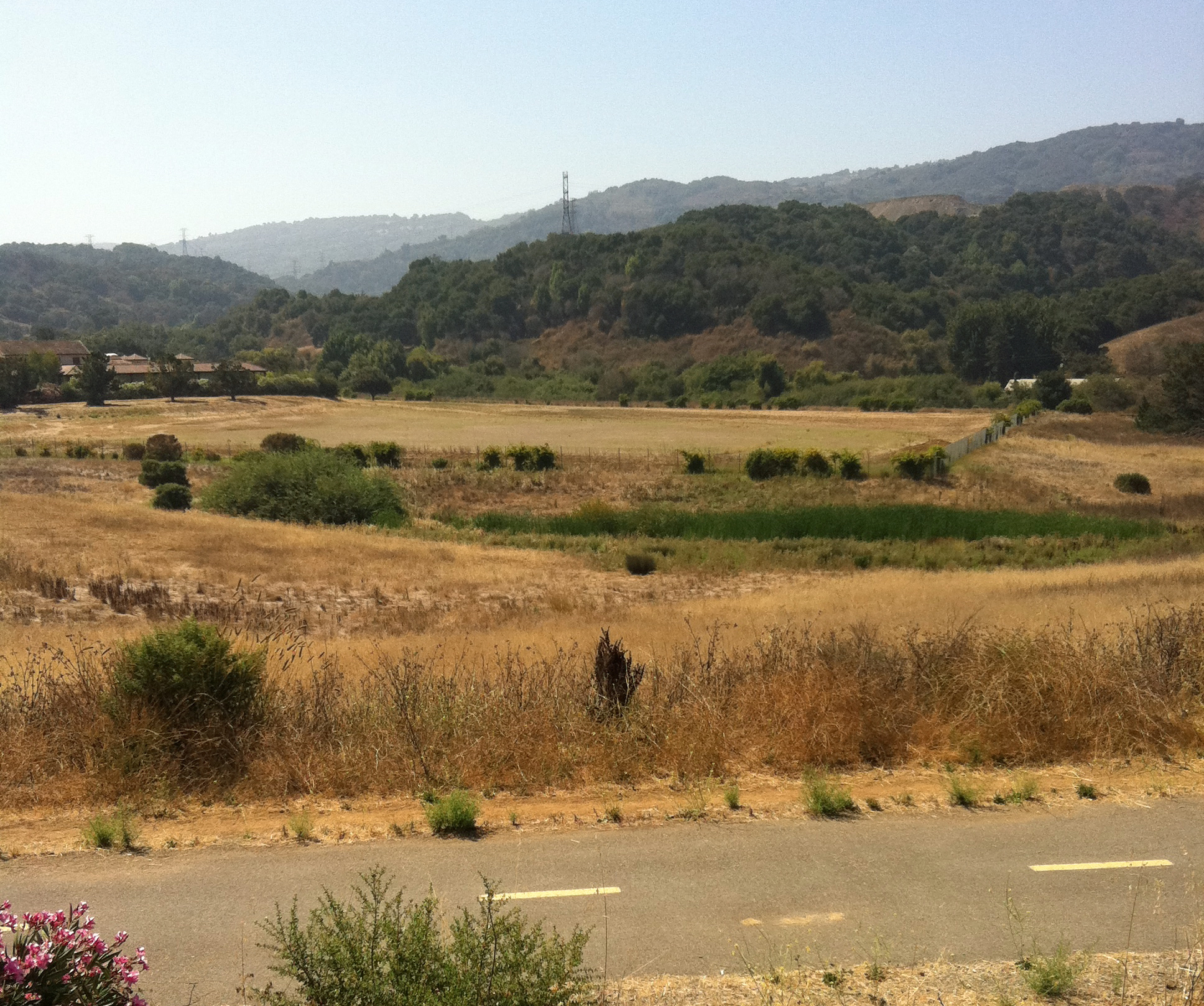
Flood detention basin on Permanente Creek at Rancho San Antonio County Park

The Santa Clara Water District has a guide to address "climate change" as they expect the area to experience changes that will impact people and wildlife. They expect changes to occur in such things as the amount of rain received to the temperature of the air. In fact, the driest start of the year the Santa Clara Water District ever recorded was noted on 3/14/2022. They also expect severe weather events such as droughts, heat waves and even wildfires to increase. This guide is known as the CCAP, or Valley Water's Climate Change Action Plan.

The action plan comprises seven key objectives: the reduction of direct and indirect greenhouse gas emissions, expansion of renewable energy portfolios, improvement of energy efficiency, water supply adaptation, flood protection adaptation, and emergency preparedness.

=== Protection and Reintroduction of endangered Species ===
The district has over 800 miles of waterways to protect and care for. Within the counties' waterways live endangered species that need protection. One goal of the Santa Clara Valley Water District is to reintroduce the California red-legged frog, an endangered amphibian. They also encourage the reestablishment and protection of other endangered species such as the steelhead trout, and the salt marsh harvest mouse.

== Incidents ==
There was a leak in one of the pipelines in 2015 resulting in an estimated loss of 20 million gallons of water and resulted in $1.2 million in repairs and property damage. The failure affected about 500 customers before it was fixed.

== Projects ==
The Santa Clara Valley Water District has been involved in several significant projects. Calabazas Creek Bank Rehabilitation Project aims to restore and maintain a healthy steelhead population in Stevens Creek watershed, and to maintain healthy steelhead and Chinook salmon populations in the Guadalupe River watershed.

The Santa Clara Valley Water District operates under the "Safe, Clean Water and Natural Flood Protection Program", which has several key objectives. These include providing a reliable water source, reducing water contaminants such as toxins and hazards, offering a safety net of the water source in case of natural disasters like earthquakes, helping restore and protect wildlife habitats, and aiding in protecting people by supplying flood protection for their businesses, homes, and schools, and providing the community with public health support.

Santa Clara Valley Water District also provides "Water Education Programs and Events". They hold virtual events and distance learning, as well as school classroom programs.

== Awards ==
In December 2010 the Santa Clara Valley Water District was chosen as the water agency award recipient for the California Sustainability Alliance's Sustainability Showcase Award. This award honors the District's commitment to sustainability as shown through their award-winning water use efficiency and conservation program.

== Leadership ==
Each year the Board of Directors elects a director to serve as the chair of the board; the 2022 Chair originally was Gary Kremen. Kremen, however, was forced to step down due to a sexual harassment scandal in March, 2022. Kremen, who was found to have committed multiple acts of bullying and abuse of power, never returned as Chair, having faced increased criticism for his inappropriate behavior. In November, 2022, Kremen was defeated by newcomer Rebecca Eisenberg, Silicon Valley attorney, columnist, and environmentalist.
