= Lexington murders =

The Lexington murders was one of the most notable crimes in California during the 19th century. Lloyd Leadbetter Majors (February 26, 1837 – May 24, 1884), Joseph Jewell (1855 – November 30, 1884) and John Franklin Showers (September 20, 1860 – May 15, 1899), were responsible for the brutal murder and robbery of William Peter Renowden and Archibald McIntyre in Lexington, California, on March 11, 1883.

Showers turned state's evidence, Jewell was executed by hanging on November 30, 1884, and Majors was executed by hanging on May 24, 1884.

== See also ==
- List of homicides in California
