= Chemeketa Park, Los Gatos, California =

Unincorporated community in California, United States

Coordinates: 37.1625°N 121.97972°W

Chemeketa Park is an unincorporated community of approximately 150 homes located in Lexington Hills, in the Santa Cruz Mountains in Santa Clara County, California, that is now effectively a rural neighborhood of Los Gatos, California. The postal designation for Chemeketa Park is "Los Gatos 95033", although it lies approximately five miles South of the official boundaries of the incorporated town of Los Gatos. The community is in area codes 408 and 669.

Nearby communities are Redwood Estates, Aldercroft Heights, and the ghost town of Holy City. Chemeketa Park is accessed off of State Route 17, on Old Santa Cruz Highway along the Big Moody Curve.

== Early history ==
Chemeketa Park was developed in 1925 and 1926 by J.B. Balcomb, a civil engineer from Palo Alto who had acquired a 63-acre (250,000 m^{2}) orchard in the Santa Cruz Mountains. An advertisement in the Sunday, June 20, 1926, edition of the San Jose Mercury Herald lists a "pre-opening sale" of lots "as low as $50.00."

Initially, lots were used for vacation cabins. The mountain communities of Chemeketa Park and Redwood Estates, etc., were considered too remote, and too difficult to access, for year-round living. Lots were advertised to Bay Area families as a summer retreat, far from the stress of city living in San Francisco or San Jose.

By the mid-1930s, with the improvement of roads and water systems, many residents began occupying their cabins year-round and combining smaller lots into larger parcels.

=== The Balcomb Family and Chemeketa Park ===
J.B. Balcomb was killed in an automobile accident in the summer of 1927. His widow and son continued the sale of lots at Chemeketa Park. Balcombs continued to own property in the development until the mid-1960s.

=== Name derivation ===
Chemeketa is a Kalapuya Indian word with various meanings attributed to it, including "resting place," "meeting place," "old home," or "old camping ground." The Kalapuya lived in the area now known as the Willamette Valley of Oregon. Chemeketa was an original name of Salem, Oregon, and still exists as the name of a community college, a library district, and various parks and streets in the Salem and Portland areas.

When J.B. Balcomb and his wife emigrated from the mid-West to California, they first stopped through eastern Oregon where they most likely heard the name. The Native American theme is present throughout Chemeketa Park with street names including "Comanche Trail," "Ogallala Warpath," "Apache Trail," and "Navajo Trail."

== Governance ==
Chemeketa Park lies in the unincorporated area of Santa Clara County. Districts for local elected representatives are:

- 1st Supervisorial (County)
- 18th Congressional (US)
- 28th State Assembly (CA)
- 15th Senate (CA)

Most of the roads within Chemeketa Park are considered private, and are not maintained by the county. The water system is also privately owned by the community and draws from natural sources and creeks within the Santa Cruz Mountains.

The Chemeketa Park Mutual Water Company was incorporated in 1929. Each property owner is a member and shareholder in the water company and may take part in its management. A five-member board is elected from the membership at an annual meeting each Spring. Board members, who are not paid for their service, meet monthly, with meetings open to all members.

The board is responsible for hiring the water master and bookkeeper and maintaining the roads. Each property owner pays a set fee each month for water and roads. Additionally, the water company owns and maintains a clubhouse that is used for meetings and community events. A separate volunteer group organizes the events, such as bluegrass music concerts and family picnics. Individual members may also arrange to use the clubhouse for private events.
