= Lake Elsman =

Lake in California, United States

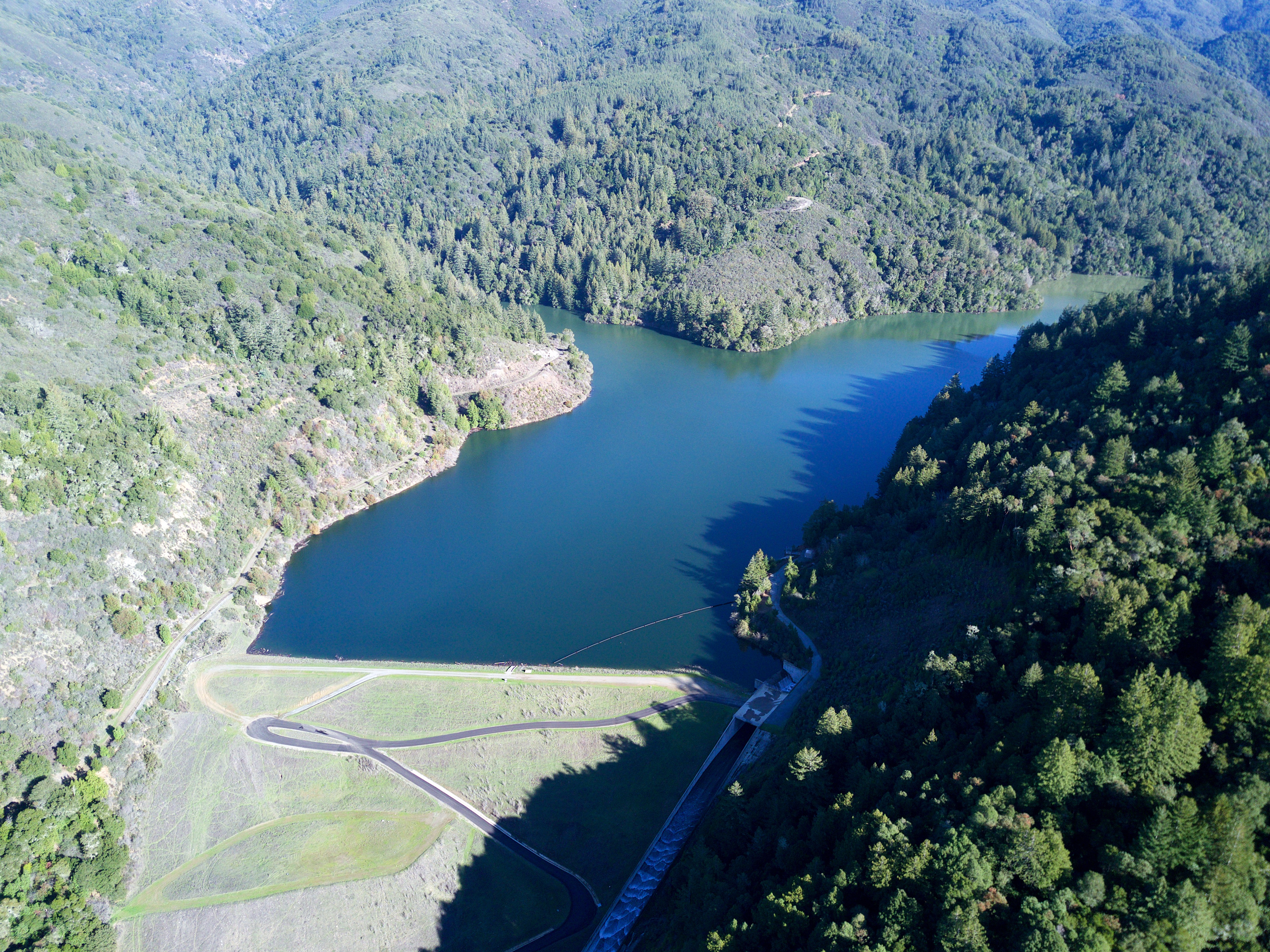

- Location within California Location within the United States
- Location: Santa Clara County, California
- Coordinates: 37°7′48″N 121°55′51″W
- Type: Earth
- Primary outflows: Los Gatos Creek
- Catchment area: 9.8 square miles (25 km^{2})
- Basin countries: United States
- Managing agency: San Jose Water Agency
- Built: 1950; 76 years ago
- Surface area: 96 acres (39 ha)
- Surface elevation: 1,119 feet (341 m)

Lake Elsman is a 6,200-acre-foot (7,600,000 m^{3}) reservoir, created by an earthen dam called Austrian Dam on Los Gatos Creek in the Santa Cruz Mountains of California. At several points it is over 140' deep and its normal surface area is 96 acres. It provides 12% of San Jose Water Works’ total water capacity in some years. The lake and dam is owned by the San Jose Water Company,

In 1988 and 1989, two earthquakes at M=5.3 and 5.4 respectively occurred at Lake Elsman that transferred stress that led to the 1989 M=6.9 1989 Loma Prieta earthquake.

== Austrian Dam ==
Construction of the Austrian Dam was completed in 1950. Beneath the reservoir are the remains of the settlements of Austrian Gulch and Germantown. The dam is more than 900 feet (270 m) long and 180 feet (55 m) high. The dam was damaged in the Loma Prieta quake. The performance of Austrian Dam during that earthquake reinforces concerns about damage to the tops of earth dams by earthquakes.

== See also ==
- List of dams and reservoirs in California
- List of lakes in California
