= James J. Lenihan Dam =

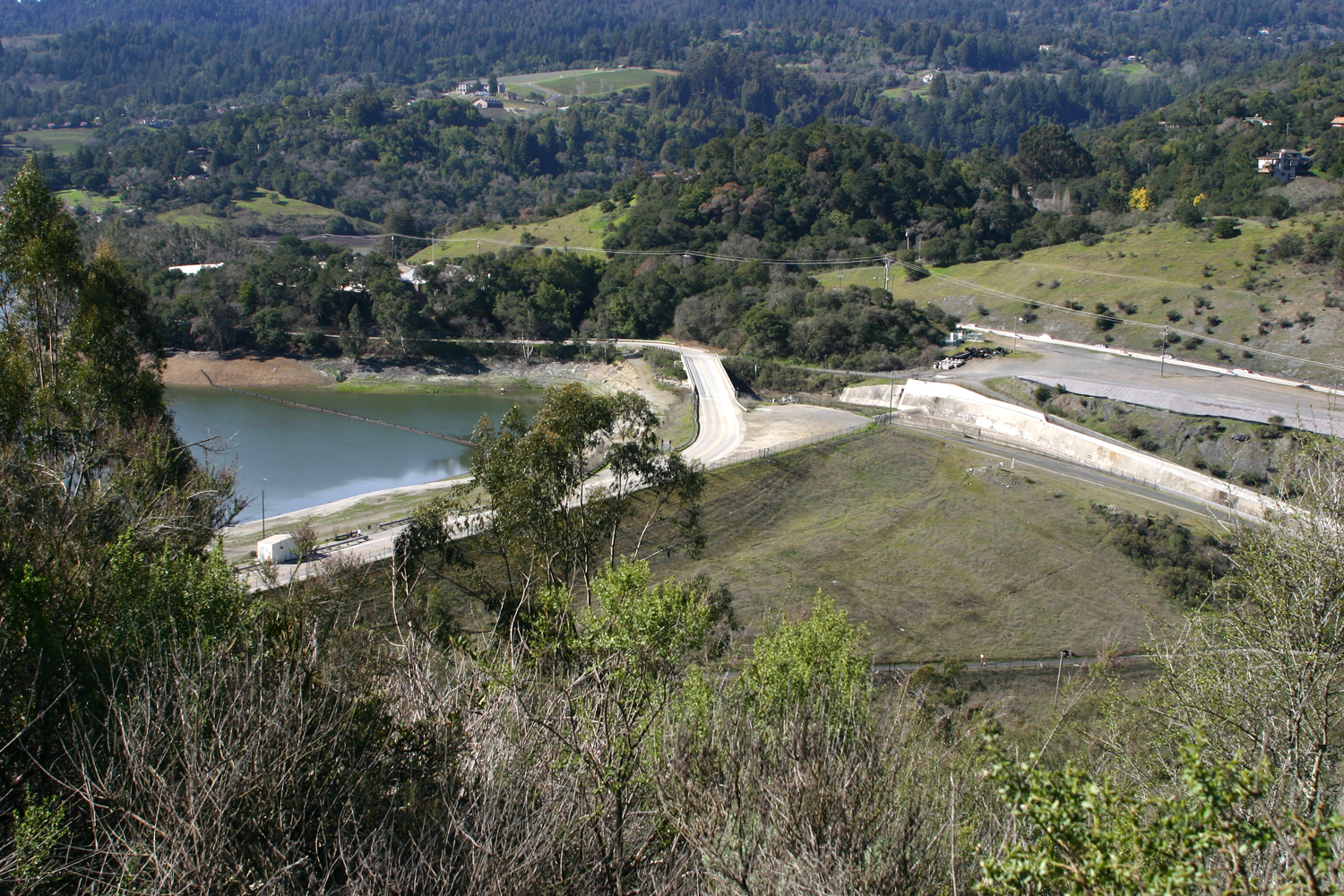
- Official name: Lexington Dam
- Location: Santa Cruz Mountains; Santa Clara County, California
- Coordinates: 37.2020°N 121.9880°W
- Opening date: 1956; 69 years ago

Dam and spillways
- Impounds: Los Gatos Creek
- Height: 208 ft (63 m)
- Length: 810 ft (250 m)
- Width (base): 40 ft (12 m)

Reservoir
- Creates: Lexington Reservoir
- Total capacity: 21,430 acre⋅ft (26,430,000 m^{3})
- Catchment area: 27.7 sq mi (72 km^{2})
- Surface area: 450 acres (180 ha)

James J. Lenihan Dam is an earthen structure across the Los Gatos Creek creating the Lexington Reservoir in the Santa Cruz Mountains of Santa Clara County, California south of Los Gatos. The name was changed from Lexington Dam in 1996 for the retirement of James J. Lenihan, the Santa Clara Valley Water District's longest-serving director.

== See also ==
- List of dams and reservoirs in California
