= Lexington Reservoir =

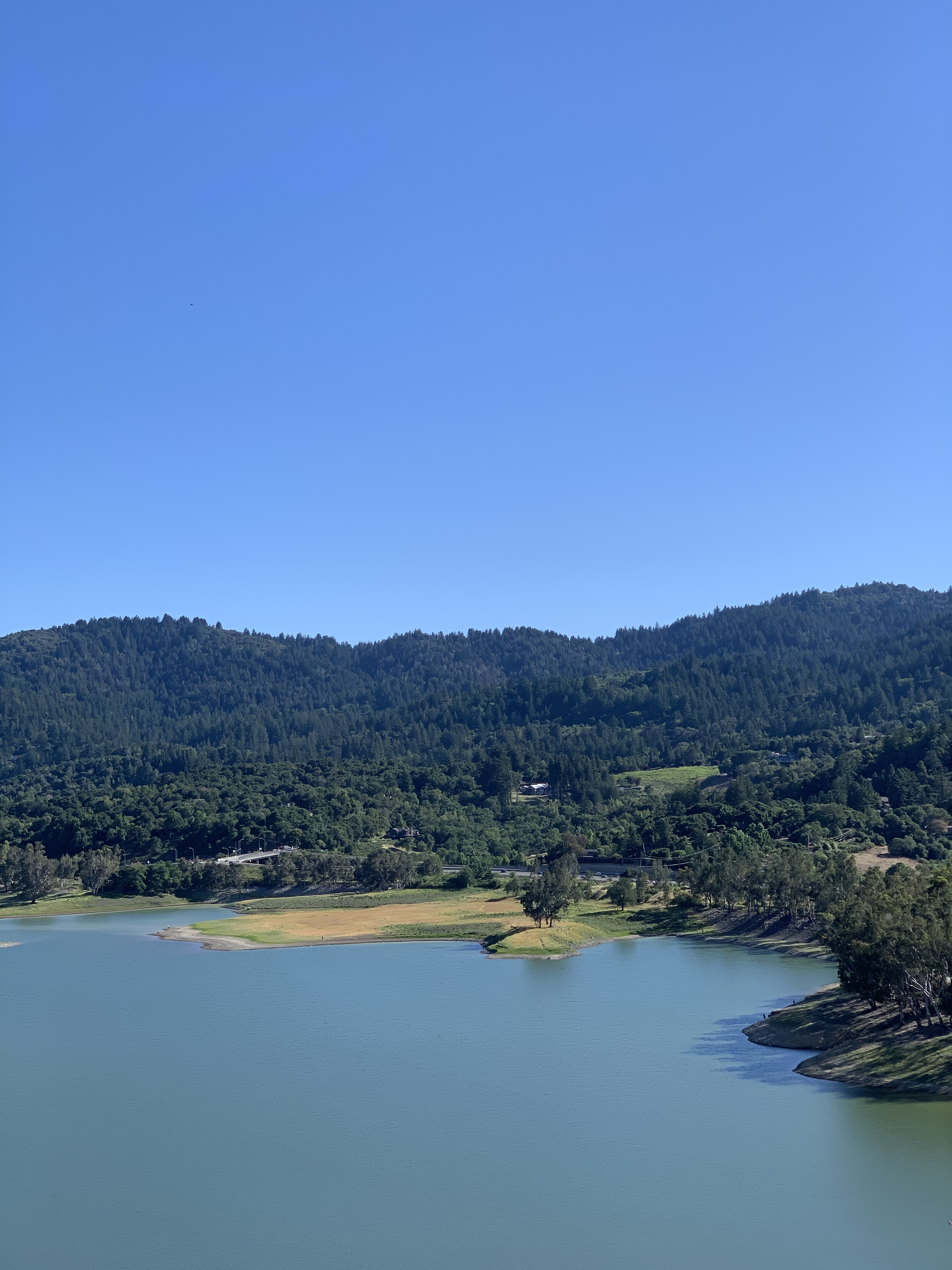

- Location within California Location within the United States
- Location: Santa Cruz Mountains; Santa Clara County, California
- Coordinates: 37.1892893°N 121.9881592°W
- Type: Reservoir
- Primary inflows: Los Gatos Creek
- Primary outflows: Los Gatos Creek
- Catchment area: 27.7 sq mi (72 km^{2})
- Basin countries: United States
- Surface area: 450 acres (1.8 km^{2})
- Water volume: 21,430 acre⋅ft (26,430,000 m^{3})
- Surface elevation: 666 ft (203 m)
- References: U.S. Geological Survey Geographic Names Information System: Lexington Reservoir

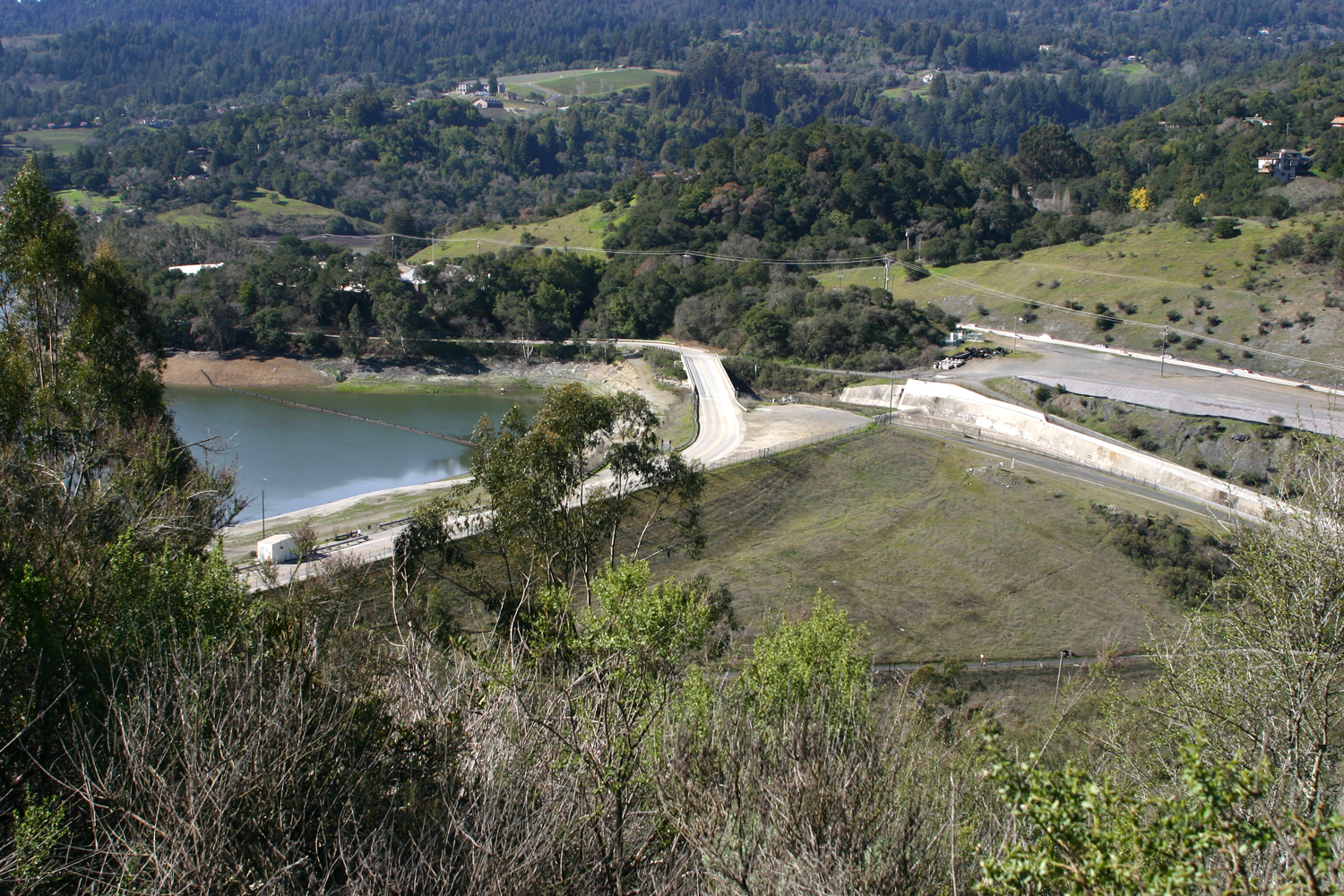
James J. Lenihan Dam

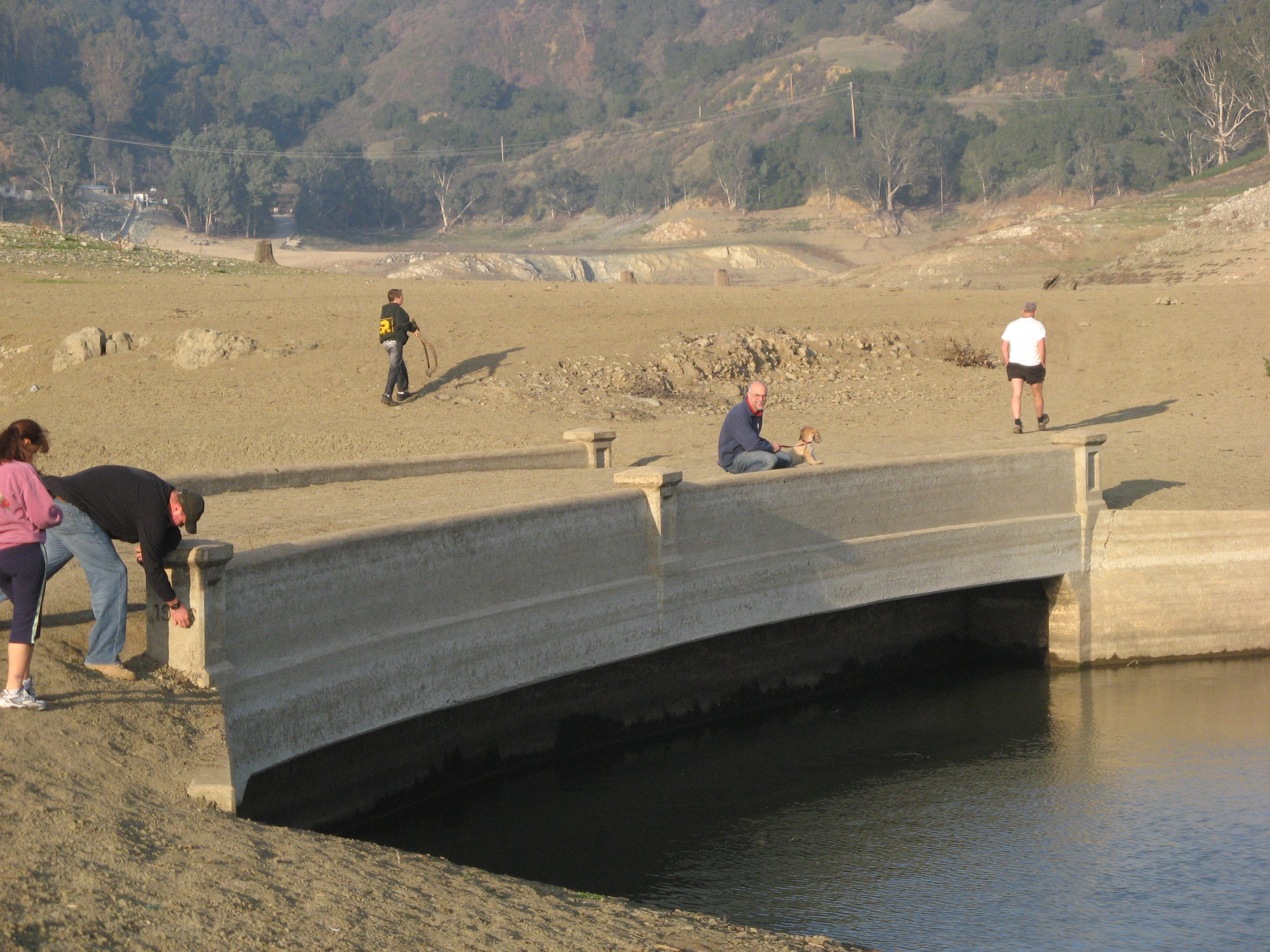
A sunken bridge across Black Creek, which was exposed during the pipe replacement project (2008).

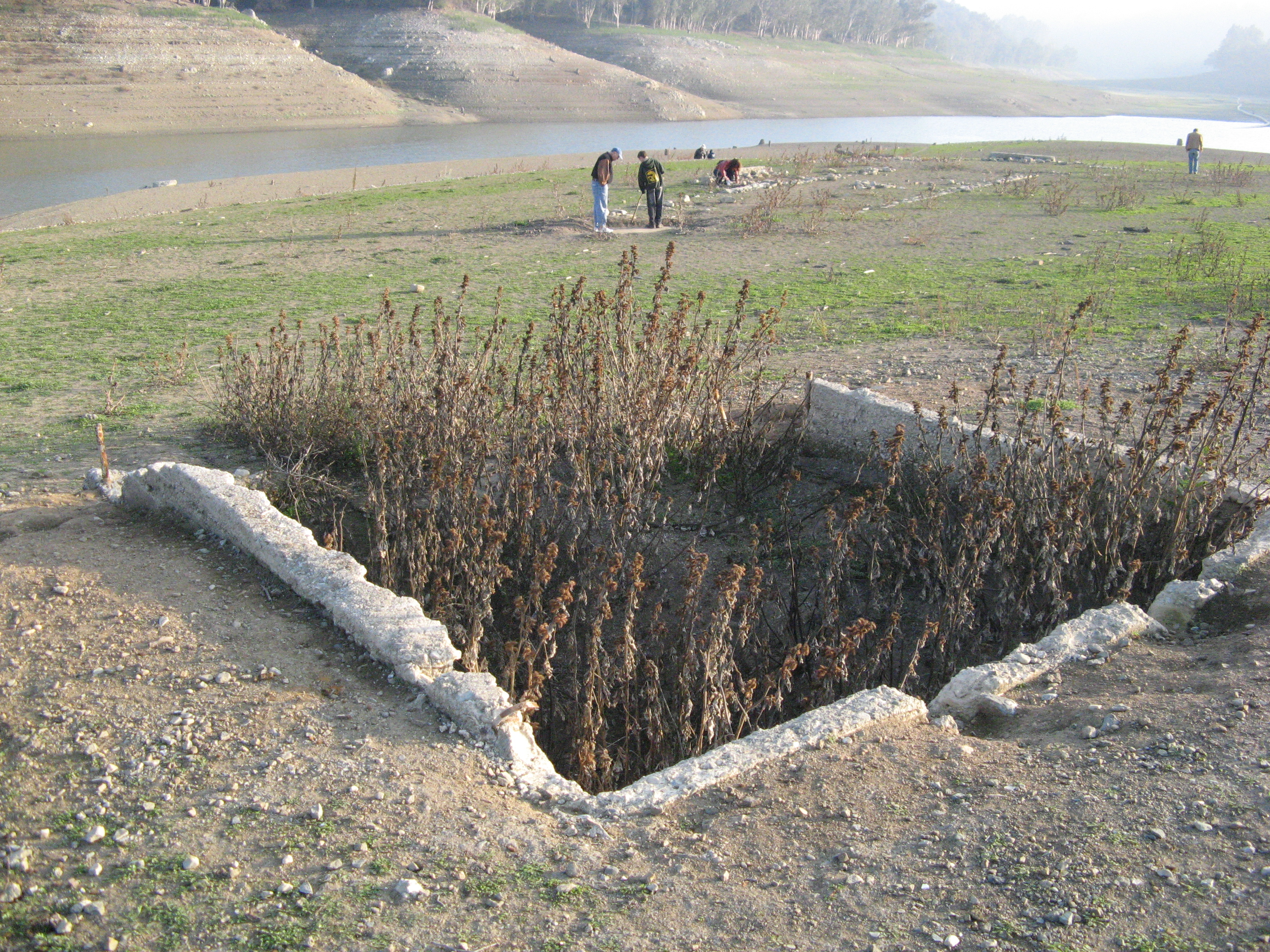
A building foundation, which was exposed during the pipe replacement project (2008).

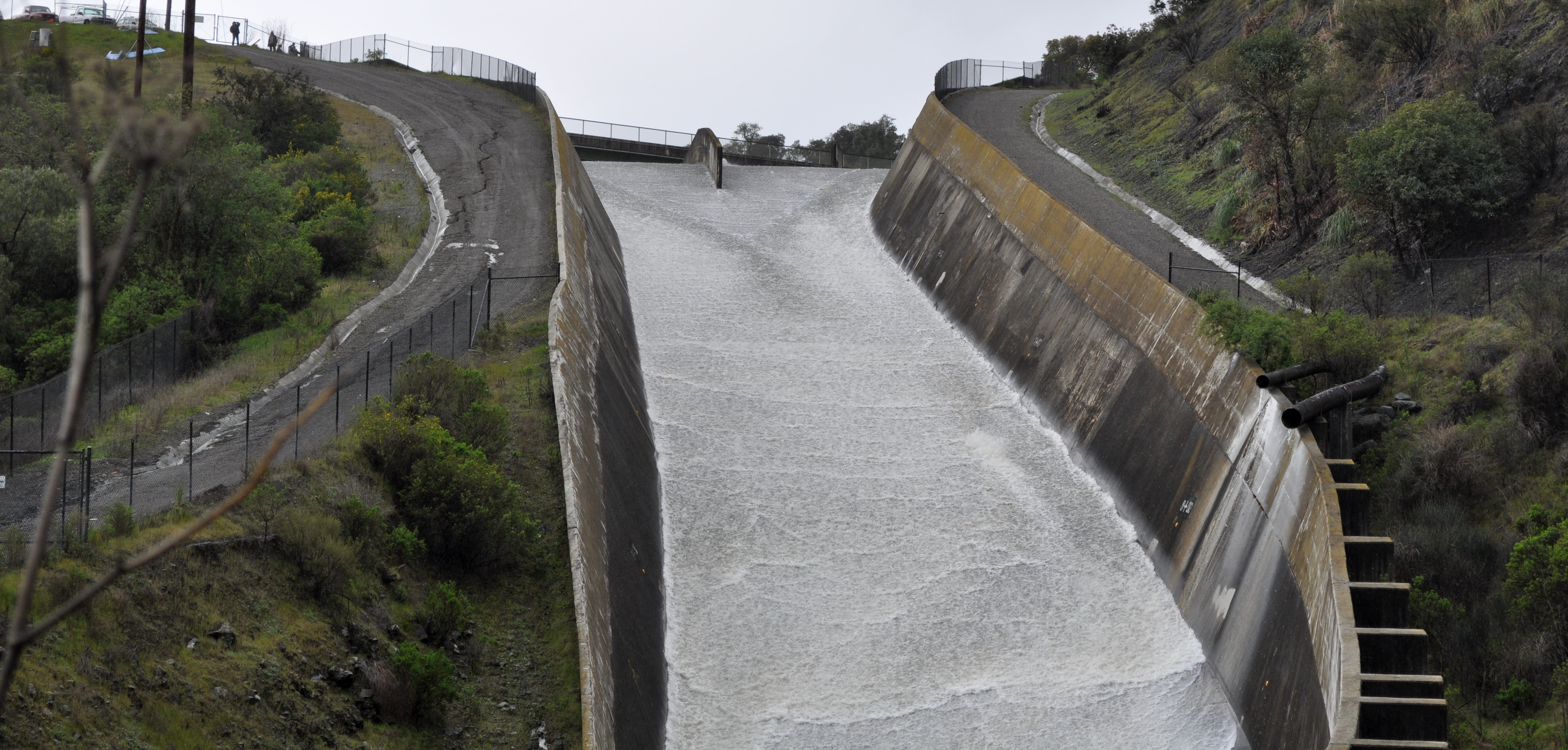
Lexington Reservoir Spillway/James J. Lenihan Dam, overflowing

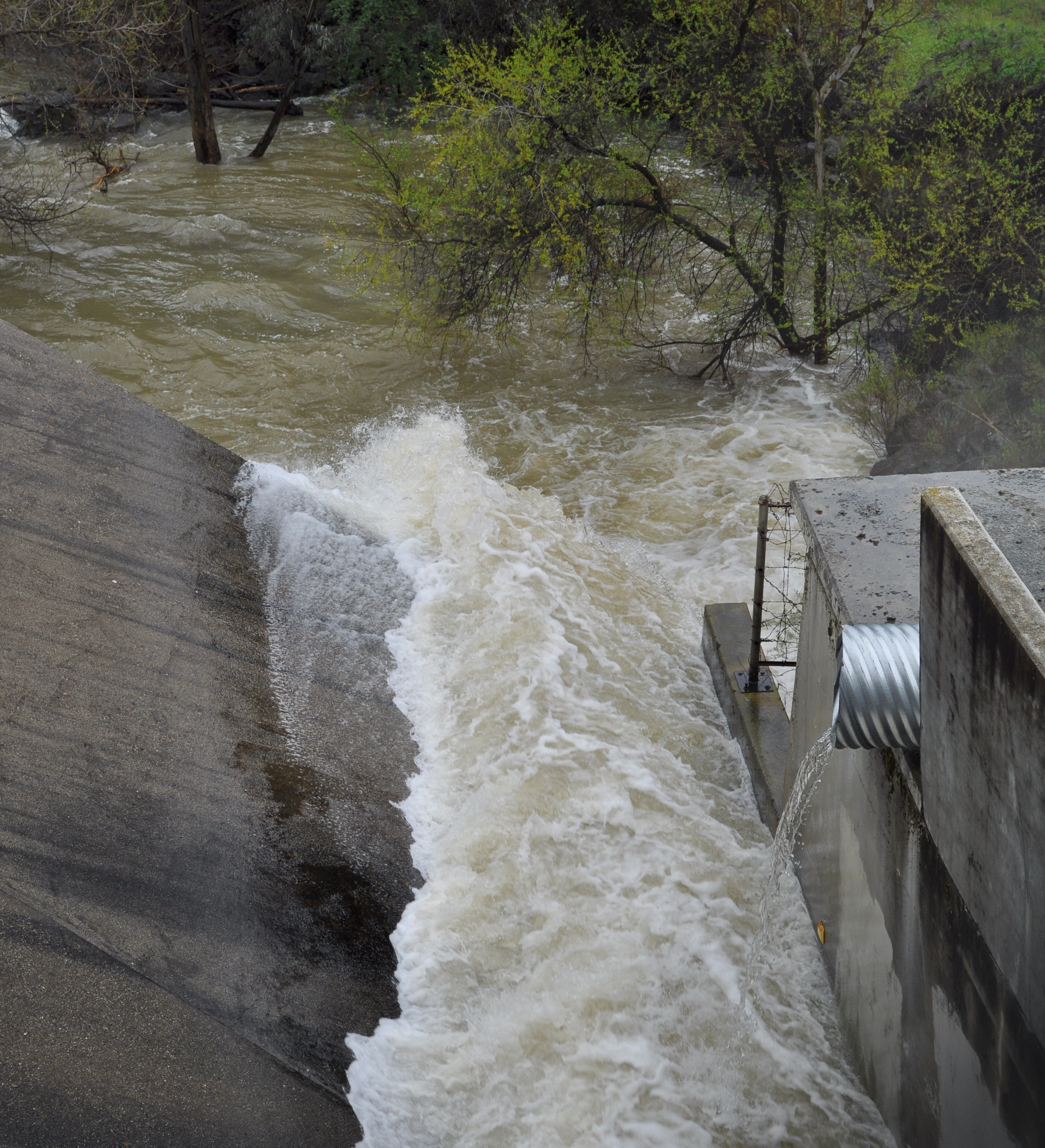
Lexington Reservoir (James J. Lenihan Dam) Spillway, emptying into Los Gatos Creek

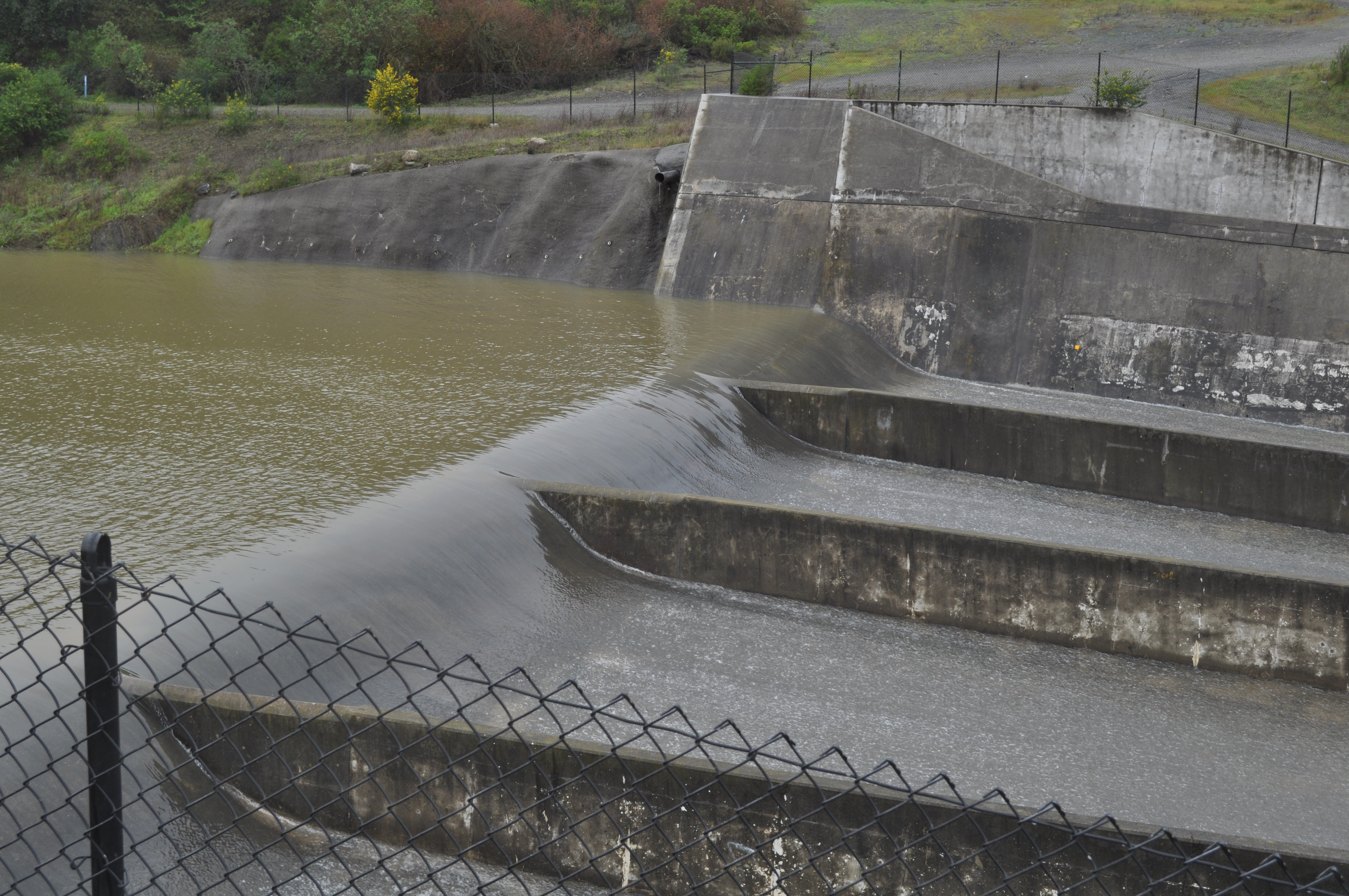
Lexington Reservoir Spillway filled with water.

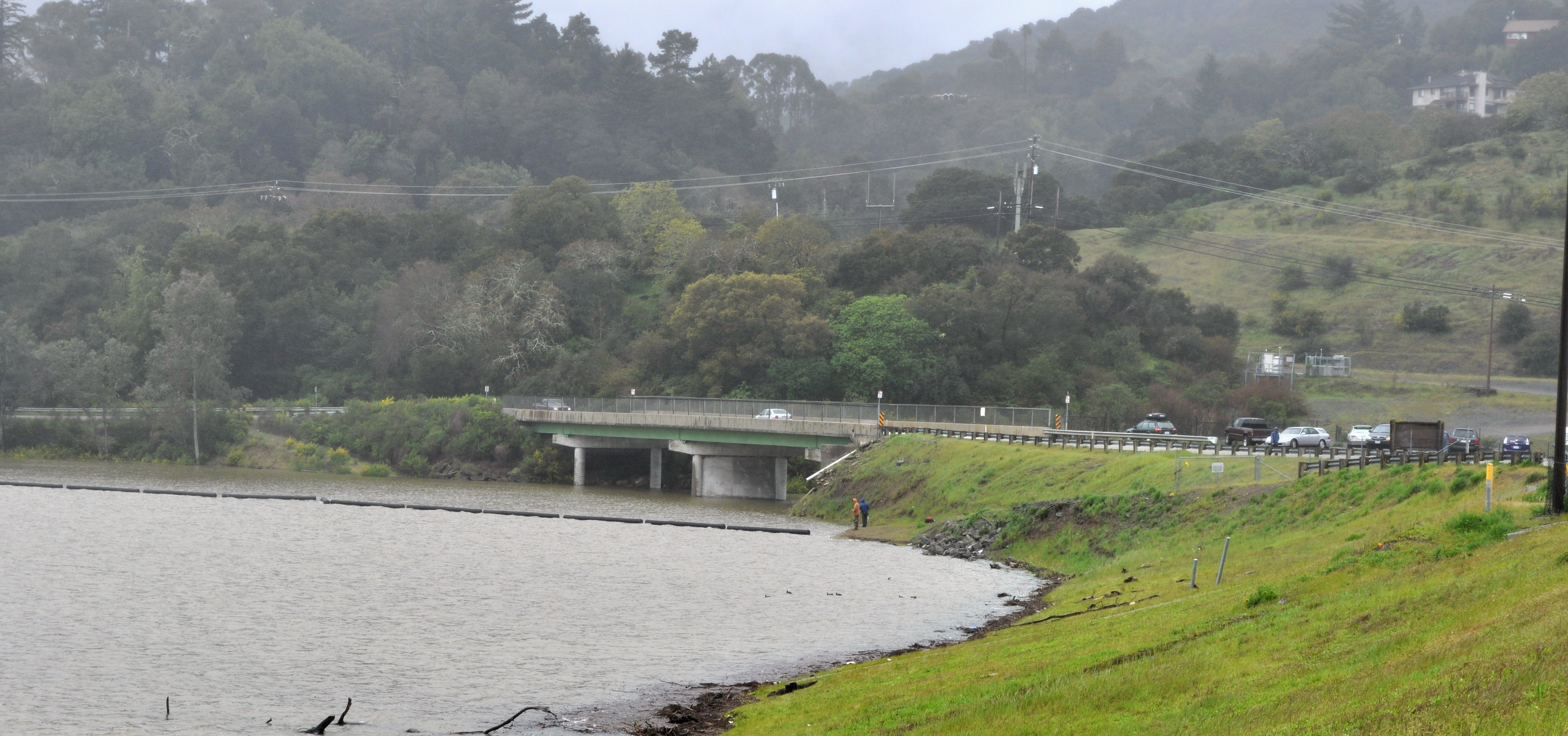
Lexington Reservoir overflows into spillway, a rare event.

Lexington Reservoir is an artificial lake on the Los Gatos Creek near Los Gatos, California. The James J. Lenihan Dam, a 195 ft (59 m) high, 1,000 ft (300 m) thick earthen dam, forms the third-largest reservoir in Santa Clara County.

== Background ==
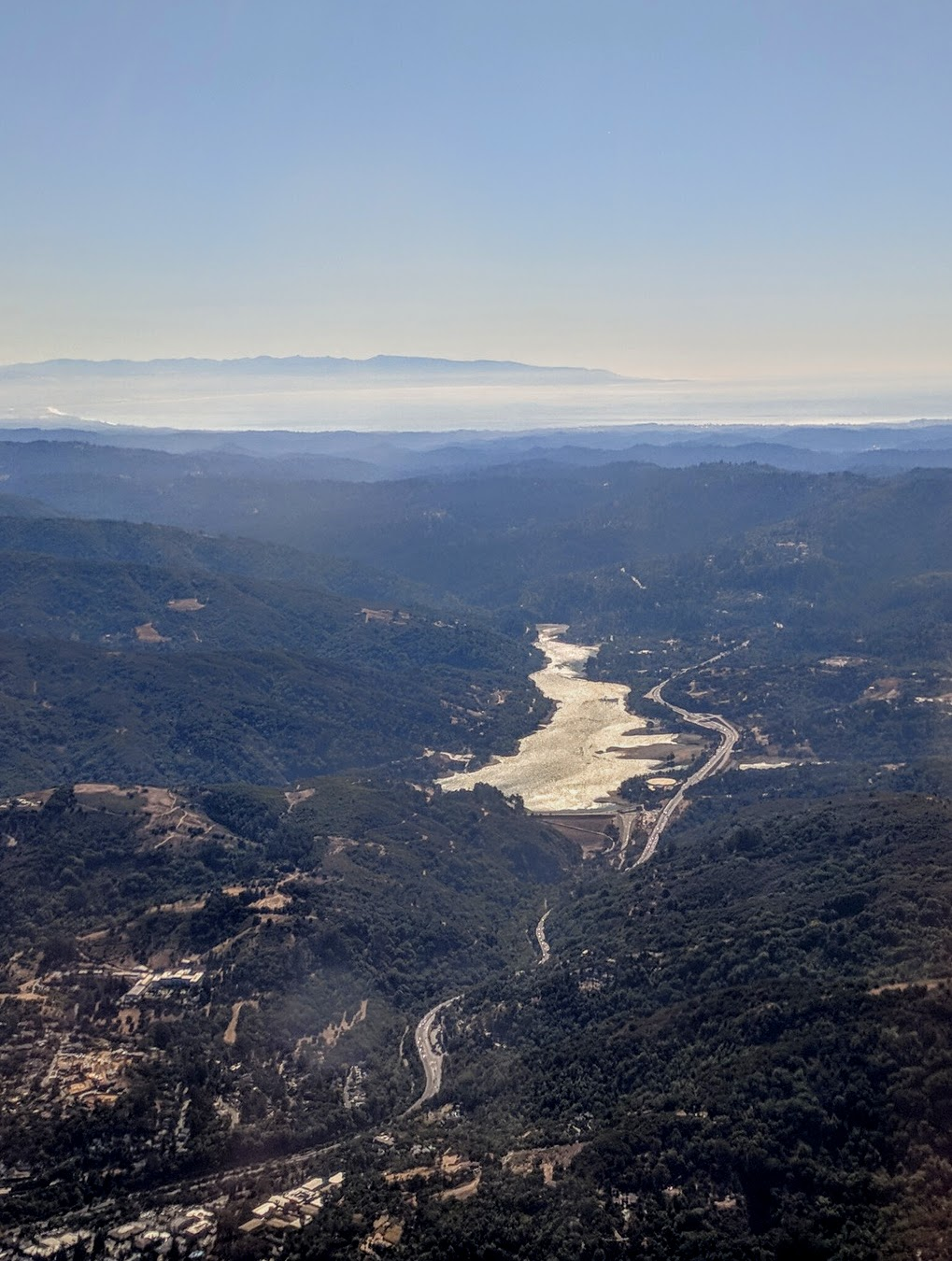
Lexington Reservoir aerial, from the north, with Monterey Bay and the Monterey Peninsula in the background

The reservoir is in the foothills of the Santa Cruz Mountains, at an elevation of 645 feet (197 m).

State Route 17 runs alongside the dam's western edge and over part of the reservoir. Alma Bridge Road (Limekiln Canyon Road) runs around the eastern side, connecting with 17 at the north end and again at the south end via other surface streets.

The reservoir is contained in Lexington Reservoir County Park, which includes hiking trails in the hills with good views of the reservoir and of Silicon Valley. The Los Gatos Creek Trail starts at the dam and continues downstream along the creek's canyon.

It is part of the Santa Clara Valley Water District and provides water for Silicon Valley.

== History ==
In 1943, because of the rapid expansion of orchards in the county, the Santa Clara Valley Water District determined that the well water in the Santa Clara Valley was being diminished rapidly and a dam was needed on Los Gatos Creek, with one goal being to percolate the water into the ground and ultimately increase the amount of well water available. After rerouting State Route 17 near Windy Point, which is a mile south of Los Gatos, the District began dam construction in the spring of 1952, completing it that fall.

The reservoir covered the towns of Lexington and Alma. Alma and Lexington reached their peak population in the mid-19th century, when about 200 people lived in each. Each of the towns had a post office, hotel, saloons, blacksmith shops, and half a dozen redwood sawmills. Lexington was the halfway stop for stagecoaches running between San Jose and Santa Cruz. The town served as a place to switch from four horses to six horses to get over the mountains. Lexington declined after 1880 when the railroad from Los Gatos to Santa Cruz bypassed it, while Alma declined when Highway 17 bypassed it in 1940. The railroad ceased operations in 1940. By 1950, only about 100 people lived in the two communities.

Lexington gained national attention in 1883, when a Los Gatos saloon keeper, Lloyd Majors, hired two thugs to rob an elderly Lexington man who kept $20,000 in gold in his cabin. They burned him with turpentine-soaked rags and beat him with pistols, killing him, and then fled with the gold. Their sensational trial in San Jose drew national attention similar to that accorded to the Lizzie Borden axe murders nine years later. Majors and one of the thugs were hanged. The other spent 15 years in prison.

== Renovation project ==
In September 2007, the Santa Clara Valley Water District began its "Lenihan Dam Outlet Project" at Lexington Reservoir. This project replaced the old 48-inch (1,200 mm) outlet pipe that ran through the base of the dam, from the reservoir to Los Gatos Creek. The old pipe was replaced with a 54-inch (1,400 mm)-diameter pipe, new valves, outlet structures, and a control building. The increase in size was made to allow the reservoir to drain quickly enough to prevent dam collapse during emergencies, such as after a major earthquake that could cause cracks in the dam, or during a series of heavy winter storms. A collapse would pose flooding risks to Los Gatos and Campbell.

The old pipe was aging, and required frequent maintenance, and repairs; it had collapsed in several places. The new outlet pipe, which runs through a new tunnel in Saint Joseph's Hill, on the east side of the dam, also features new actuating valves, and a new intake structure. The project was completed in Fall of 2009, and "first release" celebration was held on Oct. 20, 2009. The Santa Clara Valley Water District features a "Lexington Reservoir & Lenihan Dam Project" page on its website.

== Lexington Reservoir County Park ==
Besides serving as a water supply for the area, the lake is used for rowing, paddling, and fishing. Swimming is not allowed at Lexington Reservoir. Santa Clara County Parks and Recreation Department manages the 914-acre (3.70 km^{2}) Lexington Reservoir County Park. The park provides facilities for hiking and picnicking. For fishing, the reservoir is stocked with black bass, trout, bluegill, and crappie. The California Office of Environmental Health Hazard Assessment (OEHHA) has developed a safe eating advisory for Lexington Reservoir based on levels of mercury or PCBs found in fish caught from this water body. The park includes part of the San Andreas Fault, which crosses Los Gatos Creek just south of the upstream end of the reservoir. The mountains feature redwood forests, chaparral, grasslands, hardwoods, and mixed conifer habitats.

When the level of Lexington Reservoir drops, it is possible to see portions of the old roads that were used in the construction of the reservoir and that served the historic towns of Lexington and Alma that were covered by the reservoir. Some building foundations in the ghost towns are also visible at times.

The photo at right shows a bridge across Black Creek, built in 1926. The bridge, along with a few house foundations from the towns of Lexington and Alma, were exposed in 2008 when the reservoir was drained for dam maintenance. These historical structures have been exposed only three or four times since the dam was constructed.

== See also ==
- List of dams and reservoirs in California
- List of lakes in California
- List of lakes in the San Francisco Bay Area
