= John Ainsley =

John Ainsley may refer to:

- John Mark Ainsley (born 1963), English tenor
- William Ainsley (John William Ainsley, 1898–1976), Labour Member of Parliament for North West Durham
- John Colpitts Ainsley (1860–1937), Campbell canning pioneer and owner of Ainsley House
