= Campbell Historical Museum =

Museum in Campbell, California, US

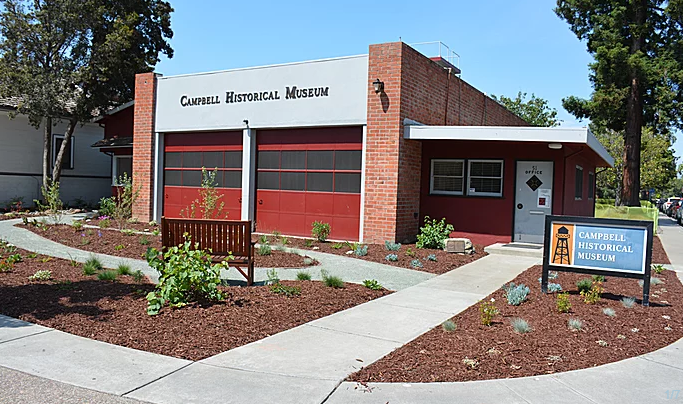
- Campbell Historical Museum
- Interactive map of the Campbell Historical Museum area

General information
- Location: 51 N. Central Avenue, Campbell, California
- Coordinates: 37.2877°N 121.9439°W
- Completed: 1964

Website
- Campbell Historical Museum

The Campbell Historical Museum is a local history museum located in Campbell, California. The museum, a section of the City of Campbell's Recreation & Parks, is the steward of the public trust of artifacts, photographs, archives and historic sites owned by the city. The museum is also responsible for archives, photographs, and objects related to the city's five historic sites: John Colpitts Ainsley House (a historic house museum), Campbell Union Grammar School (now part of the Heritage Village Offices), Campbell Union High School Historic District (now part of the Campbell Community Center), Galindo-Leigh House, and the Earl and Virginia Young House (now both private residencies).

== History ==
The museum opened in January 1964 as part of an effort by Campbell's Country Woman's Club. Over the years, the museum's location and stewardship changed many times. Since 1983, the museum has been located in Campbell's first public building, Firehouse #1 at 51 N. Central Avenue in Campbell.

== Collection ==
The Campbell Historical Museum is a repository for over 10,000 items across three collections areas: the museum collection, an education collection, and a reference collection.

== Exhibits ==
As of November 2019, the Campbell Historical Museum has four primary exhibits. There are three temporary exhibits and one permanent exhibit in the museum. The museum's current exhibits are:

- Connecting a Nation - Mail: The First Social Network
- Parades and Festivals: Connecting Communities
- Key Ingredients
- General Store (Permanent)

== Education ==
The Campbell Historical Museum, in conjunction with the Ainsley House, host education programs for local elementary students throughout the school year. The Campbell Historical Museum's education program is called Hands On History. This program allows students to explore the history of Campbell and Santa Clara County through four interactive exhibit stations: Community, Home Life, Recreation, and Work.
