= Pruneyard Shopping Center v. Robins =

- Supreme Court of the United States

Argued March 18, 1980 Decided June 9, 1980
- Full case name: Pruneyard Shopping Center v. Robins
- Citations: 447 U.S. 74 (more) 100 S.Ct. 2035; 64 L. Ed. 2d 741; 1980 U.S. LEXIS 129
- Argument: Oral argument

Case history
- Prior: Robins v. Pruneyard Shopping Ctr., 23 Cal. 3d 899, 153 Cal. Rptr. 854, 592 P.2d 341 (1979).

Holding
- A state can prohibit the private owner of a shopping center from using state trespass law to exclude peaceful expressive activity in the open areas of the shopping center.

Court membership
- Chief Justice Warren E. Burger Associate Justices William J. Brennan Jr. · Potter Stewart; Byron White · Thurgood Marshall; Harry Blackmun · Lewis F. Powell Jr. William Rehnquist · John P. Stevens

Case opinions
- Majority: Rehnquist, joined by Burger, Brennan, Stewart, Marshall, Stevens (in full); White, Powell (in part); Blackmun (in part)
- Concurrence: Marshall
- Concurrence: White (in part)
- Concurrence: Powell, joined by White (in part)

Pruneyard Shopping Center v. Robins, 447 U.S. 74 (1980), was a U.S. Supreme Court decision issued on June 9, 1980 which affirmed the decision of the California Supreme Court in a case that arose out of a free speech dispute between the Pruneyard Shopping Center in Campbell, California, and several local high school students (who wished to canvass signatures for a petition against United Nations General Assembly Resolution 3379).

== Case ==
The underlying dispute began in November 1975, when a group of high school students set up a table at the Pruneyard Shopping Center in Campbell, California to seek signatures from passersby for a petition they wished to send to the United Nations (UN) following the UN's condemnation of Zionism as "a form of racism and racial discrimination". The shopping center's security guards asked them to leave because they had not obtained permission from the shopping center's owners. The students sued the shopping center for violating their rights under the First Amendment, as well as their right to "petition government for redress of grievances" under the California state constitution. The Santa Clara County Superior Court ruled against the students on the basis of Lloyd Corp. v. Tanner 407 U.S. 551 (1972), in which the U.S. Supreme Court had refused to find a First Amendment right of freedom of speech on others' private property.

The Supreme Court of California reversed the decision of the superior court, ruling in favor of the students. The state supreme court held that the state constitution's rights to freedom of speech and to petition for redress of grievances operate independently of and were unaffected by the interpretation of the federal First Amendment in Lloyd. The shopping center's owner petitioned the U.S. Supreme Court, which unanimously upheld the decision of the California Supreme Court.

In American constitutional law, this case established two important rules:

- Under the California Constitution, individuals may peacefully exercise their right to free speech in parts of private shopping centers regularly held open to the public, subject to reasonable regulations adopted by the shopping centers
- Under the U.S. Constitution, states can provide their citizens with broader rights in their constitutions than under the federal Constitution, so long as those rights do not infringe on any federal constitutional rights

This holding was possible because California's constitution contains an affirmative right of free speech which has been liberally construed by the Supreme Court of California, while the federal constitution's First Amendment contains only a negative command to Congress to not abridge the freedom of speech. This distinction was significant because the U.S. Supreme Court had already held that under the federal First Amendment, there was no implied right of free speech within a private shopping center. The Pruneyard case, therefore, raised the question of whether an implied right of free speech could arise under a state constitution without conflicting with the federal Constitution. In answering yes to that question, the Court rejected the shopping center's argument that California's broader free speech right amounted to a "taking" of the shopping center under federal constitutional law.

Footnote two of the decision quotes the relevant portions of the California Constitution, which states in Article 1, § 2

Every person may freely speak, write and publish his or her sentiments on all subjects, being responsible for the abuse of this right. A law may not restrain or abridge liberty of speech or press.

and Article 1, § 3

[P]eople have the right to ... petition government for redress of grievances.

The vote to uphold the California decision was unanimous, although four justices disagreed with part of the reasoning in Justice William Rehnquist's opinion for the majority. Justices Thurgood Marshall, Byron White, and Lewis Powell filed separate concurring opinions. Justice Harry Blackmun filed a brief "statement" indicating that he was joining in all of Justice Rehnquist's opinion except for one sentence.

== Subsequent developments ==
Although 39 other states have free speech clauses in their constitutions that look like California's – indeed, California borrowed its clause from a similar one in the New York Constitution – at least 13 of those states have declined to follow California in extending the right of free speech into private shopping centers. In refusing to follow Pruneyard, the state supreme courts of New York and Wisconsin both attacked it as an unprincipled and whimsical decision. In 2003, the European Court of Human Rights also considered and refused to follow Pruneyard, in a United Kingdom case. Only New Jersey, Colorado, and Massachusetts have followed California, albeit with some reservations. In a 2000 decision, Puerto Rico (a U.S. territory) also adopted Pruneyard's right of free speech, although the case was complicated by the presence of a branch office of a government agency (Puerto Rico Telephone, since privatized) in the shopping center (the Mayagüez Mall). Some commentators have suggested the Pruneyard rule could be applied to speech on the Internet, including speech activities in virtual worlds, like Linden Lab's Second Life, although the courts have not addressed this theory.

In the decades since Pruneyard was decided, the Supreme Court of California has become much more conservative, especially after three liberal justices (including Chief Justice Rose Bird) were removed by the electorate in 1986 after a campaign that focused upon their opposition to the death penalty.

In the 2001 Golden Gateway decision, a 4–3 majority of the Court significantly narrowed Pruneyard by holding for a variety of reasons that California's free speech right does not apply to private apartment complexes – yet they also refused to overrule Pruneyard. Thus, California's right of free speech in private shopping centers still survives.

The shopping center industry strongly opposes the Pruneyard decision as it has resulted in numerous test cases by protesters in California and elsewhere trying to find the boundaries of the Pruneyard rule. Shopping centers have regularly imposed restrictions on unwanted solicitors and appealed the resulting legal cases in the hope of convincing the California judiciary that Pruneyard should be overturned, or at least limited. Since Golden Gateway, decisions by the intermediate Courts of Appeal have generally limited the scope of the Pruneyard rule to the facts of the original case. For example, starting in 1997, the parking lots of many Costco warehouse club stores in California became sites of conflict involving a large number of political activist groups who had gradually become aware of their rights under Pruneyard. In 1998, Costco's management imposed several restrictions, including a complete ban on soliciting at stand-alone stores, a rule that no group or person could use Costco premises for free speech more than 5 days out of any 30, and the complete exclusion of solicitors on the 34 busiest days of the year.

In 2002, these restrictions were upheld as reasonable by the Court of Appeal for the Fourth Appellate District, and the Supreme Court of California denied review. Costco's stand-alone stores lacked the social congregation attributes of the multi-tenant shopping center at issue in Pruneyard. As for the restrictions on the stores in shopping centers, they were held to be reasonable because Costco had developed a strong factual record at trial which proved that hordes of unwanted solicitors had significantly interfered with its business operations – they had damaged its reputation, obstructed access to its stores, and traumatized Costco employees. In practice, the right of a shopping center owner to impose "reasonable" restrictions is said to pose a formidable obstacle for protestors.

In 2004, researchers contacted the chairs of the Democratic and Republican parties in Santa Clara County, where Pruneyard is located. The chairmen said that they did not canvass for signatures at Pruneyard because shoppers were not interested in politics, and that public sidewalks were a better location.

In 2007, the Supreme Court of California confronted the Pruneyard decision once more, in the context of a complex labor dispute involving San Diego's Fashion Valley Mall and the San Diego Union-Tribune. On December 24, 2007, a 4–3 majority of a sharply divided court once again refused to overrule Pruneyard, and instead, ruled that under the California Constitution, a union's right of free speech in a shopping center includes the right to hand out leaflets urging patrons to boycott one of the shopping center's tenants. Justice Ming Chin, in his dissent joined by Justices Marvin Baxter and Carol Corrigan, expressed his sympathy with several of the most common critiques of the Pruneyard decision.

In the aftermath of the Fashion Valley case, the California Courts of Appeal briefly began to apply Pruneyard more broadly. In 2010, the Court of Appeal for the Third Appellate District, in an opinion authored by then-Justice Tani Cantil-Sakauye held that it is unconstitutional under Pruneyard for shopping mall giant Westfield Group to promulgate rules discriminating in favor of commercial speech in its malls and against noncommercial speech. The plaintiff had been detained by Westfield security after attempting to discuss the principles of his Christian faith with strangers at the Westfield Galleria at Roseville.

In 2011, the Court of Appeal for the Second Appellate District disagreed with the Fourth Appellate District's analysis of blackout days in the Costco case, and held that it was unreasonable for Westside Pavilion to prohibit animal rights protesters from protesting on certain blackout days and to require them to protest out of aural and visual range of the targeted tenant (an alleged retailer for puppy mills).

On December 27, 2012, the Supreme Court of California reaffirmed Pruneyard but narrowed its applicability to the facts of the original case. The entire court concurred in Associate Justice Joyce Kennard's holding that Pruneyard applies only to "common areas" of shopping centers that are designed and furnished to encourage shoppers to linger, congregate, relax, or converse at leisure, but does not apply to any other open portions of shopping centers merely intended to facilitate the efficient movement of shoppers in and out of tenants, including concrete aprons and sidewalks which shoppers simply walk across as they move between parking lots and big-box stores. In other words, the court effectively immunized most (but not all) strip malls and shopping centers from Pruneyard, except for those with areas analogous to public gathering areas such as plazas, atriums, or food courts. Miriam Vogel, a former Court of Appeal justice who argued for the shopping center tenant (Kroger subsidiary Ralphs), characterized the decision "a great victory for retailers as far as putting another nail in the Pruneyard coffin." However, the decision was not a complete loss for free speech advocates, as the court separately upheld the right of a union to protest on the employer's premises under the state Moscone Act by a 6–1 majority (the majority, though, was significantly split as to why).

== Relevance to cases involving online forums ==
Pruneyard has been identified as possible case law in challenging the protections from liability of Internet service providers, like Facebook and Twitter, under Section 230 of the Communications Decency Act. Section 230 immunizes such providers from liability for content generated by their users, as well as for decisions to remove or moderate content they deem objectionable, language which has enabled the Internet to flourish since its passage in 1996. In the years leading up to and after Donald Trump was elected president in 2016, conservatives claimed that Internet sites were unfairly moderating against their viewpoints and have sought ways to try to weaken Section 230 as applied to sites allegedly engaged in nonneutral practices. Pruneyard has been cited in litigation by conservatives seeking to coerce Internet sites to cease moderation or restrictions on their content, such as in a 2019 case of PragerU seeking to stop YouTube from demonetizing its videos, by equating such sites as the equivalent of shopping malls, but these attempts have been so far accepted in only one case. Pruneyard was cited by the Fifth Circuit in a decision that upheld Texas House Bill 20, which limits the ability of Internet platform companies to remove user-submitted content and carry out other content moderation tasks. Other arguments citing Pruneyard have been rejected by courts. Nevertheless, Trump himself cited Pruneyard in Executive Order 13925, "Preventing Online Censorship", signed in May 2020, which seeks to modify the application of Section 230.
