= Bascom station =

VTA light rail station in San Jose, California

Bascom
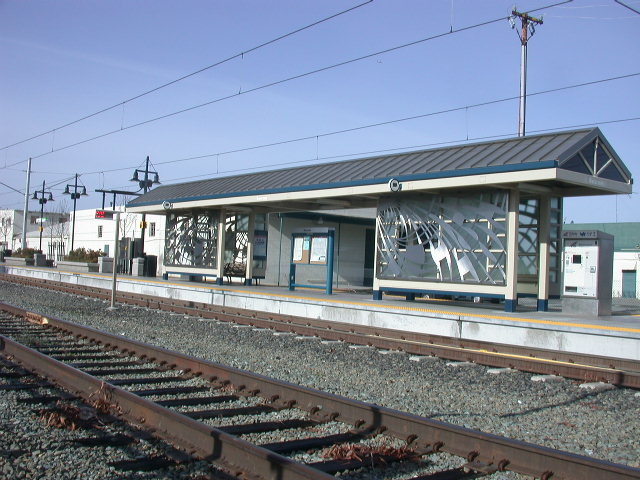
- Bascom station platform, 2006

General information
- Location: 2051 Southwest Expressway; San Jose, California
- Coordinates: 37°17′59″N 121°55′48″W
- Owner: Santa Clara Valley Transportation Authority
- Platforms: 1 island platform
- Tracks: 2
- Connections: VTA Bus: 61

Construction
- Parking: 102 spaces
- Accessible: Yes

History
- Opened: October 1, 2005

Services
Preceding station	VTA	Following station
Fruitdale toward Old Ironsides	Green Line	Hamilton toward Winchester
Location

Bascom station is a light rail station operated by Santa Clara Valley Transportation Authority (VTA). It is located along the Southwest Expressway near the intersection of Bascom Avenue, and a block away from the Los Gatos Creek Trail trailhead. The Los Gatos Creek Trail trailhead is located about a block away from the station The station has a single center platform between two tracks. Bascom station is served by the Green Line of the VTA light rail system.

== History ==
Bascom station was built as part of the Vasona Light Rail extension project. This project extended VTA light rail service from the intersection of Woz Way and West San Carlos St in San Jose in a southwesterly direction to the Winchester station in western Campbell.

The official opening date for this station was October 1, 2005.

The construction of this station and the rest of the Vasona Light Rail extension was part of the 1996 Measure B Transportation Improvement Program. Santa Clara County voters approved the Measure B project in 1996 along with a one half percent sales tax increase. The Vasona Light Rail extension was funded mostly by the resulting sales tax revenues with additional money coming from federal and state funding, grants, VTA bond revenues, and municipal contributions.

=== Screens ===
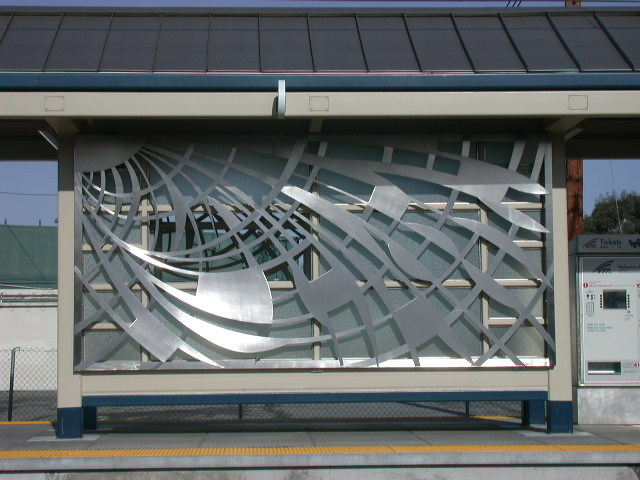
Metal screens that adorn the shelter of the Bascom VTA light rail station.

San Jose artist Diana Pumpelly Bates has created metal screens for the shelters that provide visual interest for passengers at the stations as well as for motorists and pedestrians passing by the stations. The patterns are a reminder of woven baskets created by the valley's early inhabitants.
