= Fruitdale station =

VTA light rail station in San Jose, California

Fruitdale
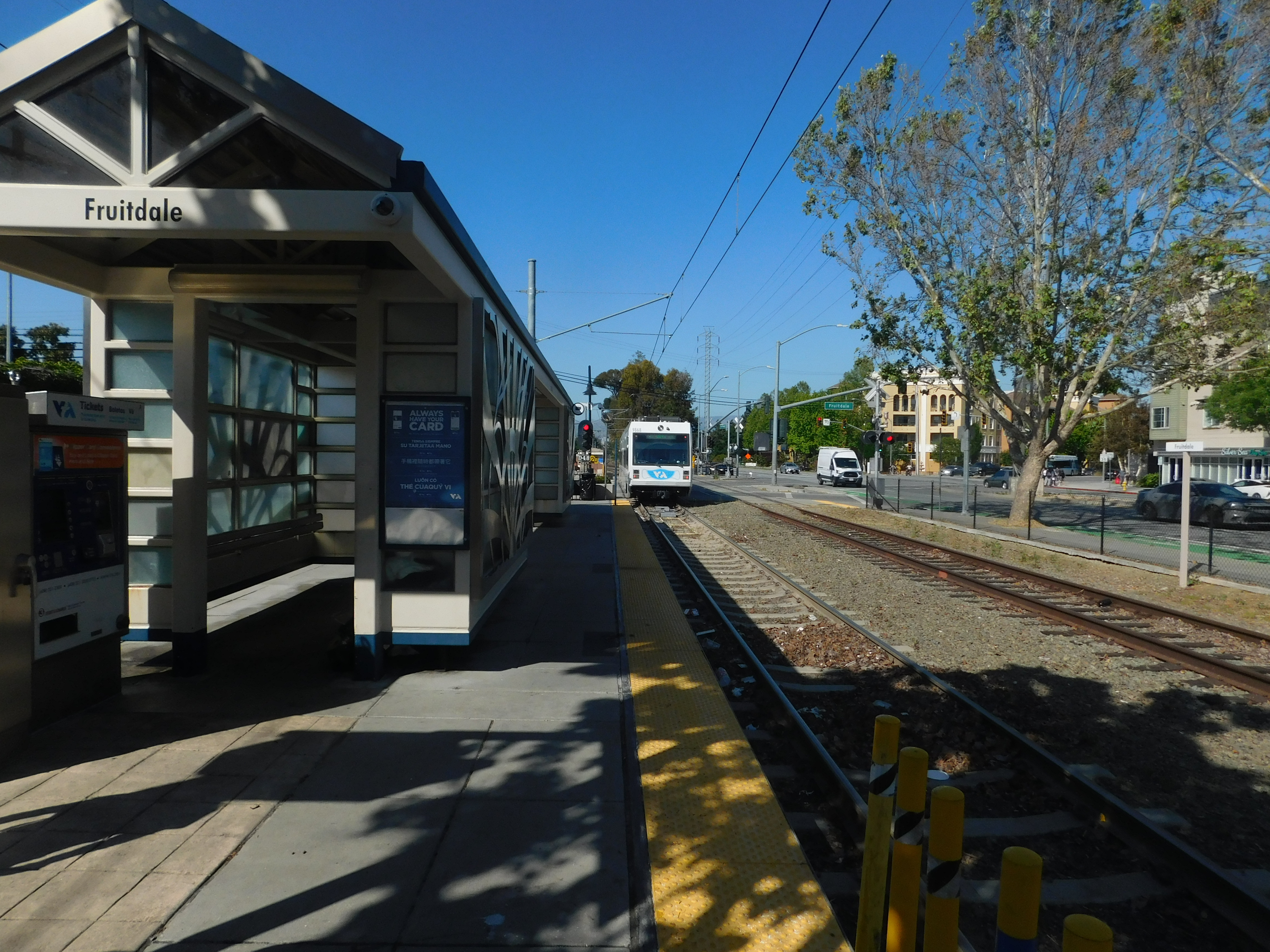
- Fruitdale station in May 2023.

General information
- Location: 1490 Fruitdale Street; San Jose, California
- Coordinates: 37°18′37″N 121°55′06″W
- Owner: Santa Clara Valley Transportation Authority
- Platforms: 1 island platform
- Tracks: 2
- Connections: VTA Bus: 25, Express 103

Construction
- Accessible: Yes

History
- Opened: October 1, 2005

Services
Preceding station	VTA	Following station
Race Street toward Old Ironsides	Green Line	Bascom toward Winchester
Location

Fruitdale station is a light rail station in the Fruitdale neighborhood of San Jose, California, operated by Santa Clara Valley Transportation Authority (VTA). The station has a center platform situated between two trackways. Fruitdale station is served by the Green Line of the VTA light rail system.

== Location ==
Fruitdale station is located near the intersection of Fruitdale Avenue and Southwest Expressway in San Jose, California. The station is located near the San José City College, Santa Clara Valley Medical Center and the Sherman Oaks Community Center.

== History ==
Fruitdale station was built as part of the Vasona Light Rail extension project. This project extended VTA light rail service from the intersection of Woz Way and West San Carlos St in San Jose in a southwesterly direction to the Winchester station in western Campbell.

The official opening date for this station was October 1, 2005.

The construction of this station and the rest of the Vasona Light Rail extension was part of the 1996 Measure B Transportation Improvement Program. Santa Clara County voters approved the Measure B project in 1996, along with a one half-percent sales tax increase. The Vasona Light Rail extension was funded mostly by the resulting sales tax revenues with additional money coming from federal and state funding, grants, VTA bond revenues, and municipal contributions.

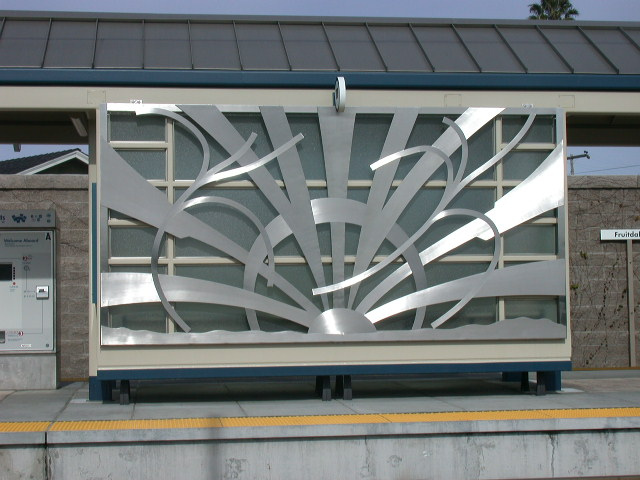
Metal screens that adorn the shelter at the Fruitdale VTA light rail station

San Jose artist Diana Pumpelly Bates has created metal screens for the shelters that provide visual interest for passengers at the stations as well as for motorists and pedestrians passing by the stations. The designs reflect the rising and setting sun.
