= Hamilton station (VTA) =

VTA light rail station in Campbell, California

Hamilton
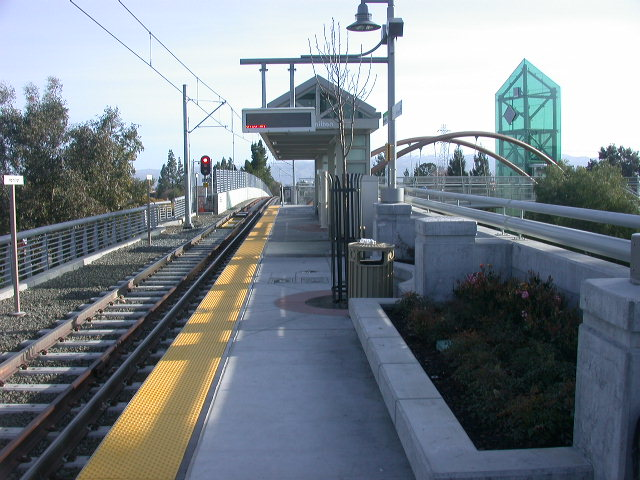
- Hamilton station platform, looking northeast

General information
- Location: 850 East Hamilton Avenue; Campbell, California
- Coordinates: 37°17′38″N 121°56′11″W
- Owner: Santa Clara Valley Transportation Authority
- Platforms: 1 side platform
- Tracks: 1
- Connections: VTA Bus: 56

Construction
- Structure type: Elevated
- Accessible: Yes

History
- Opened: October 1, 2005

Services
Preceding station	VTA	Following station
Bascom toward Old Ironsides	Green Line	Downtown Campbell toward Winchester
Location

Hamilton station is an elevated light rail station located over East Hamilton Avenue, after which the station is named, near its intersection with Creekside Way and California State Route 17, in Campbell, California. The station is owned by Santa Clara Valley Transportation Authority (VTA) and is served by the Green Line of the VTA light rail system. The station has a single track used by trains traveling in both directions.

== History ==
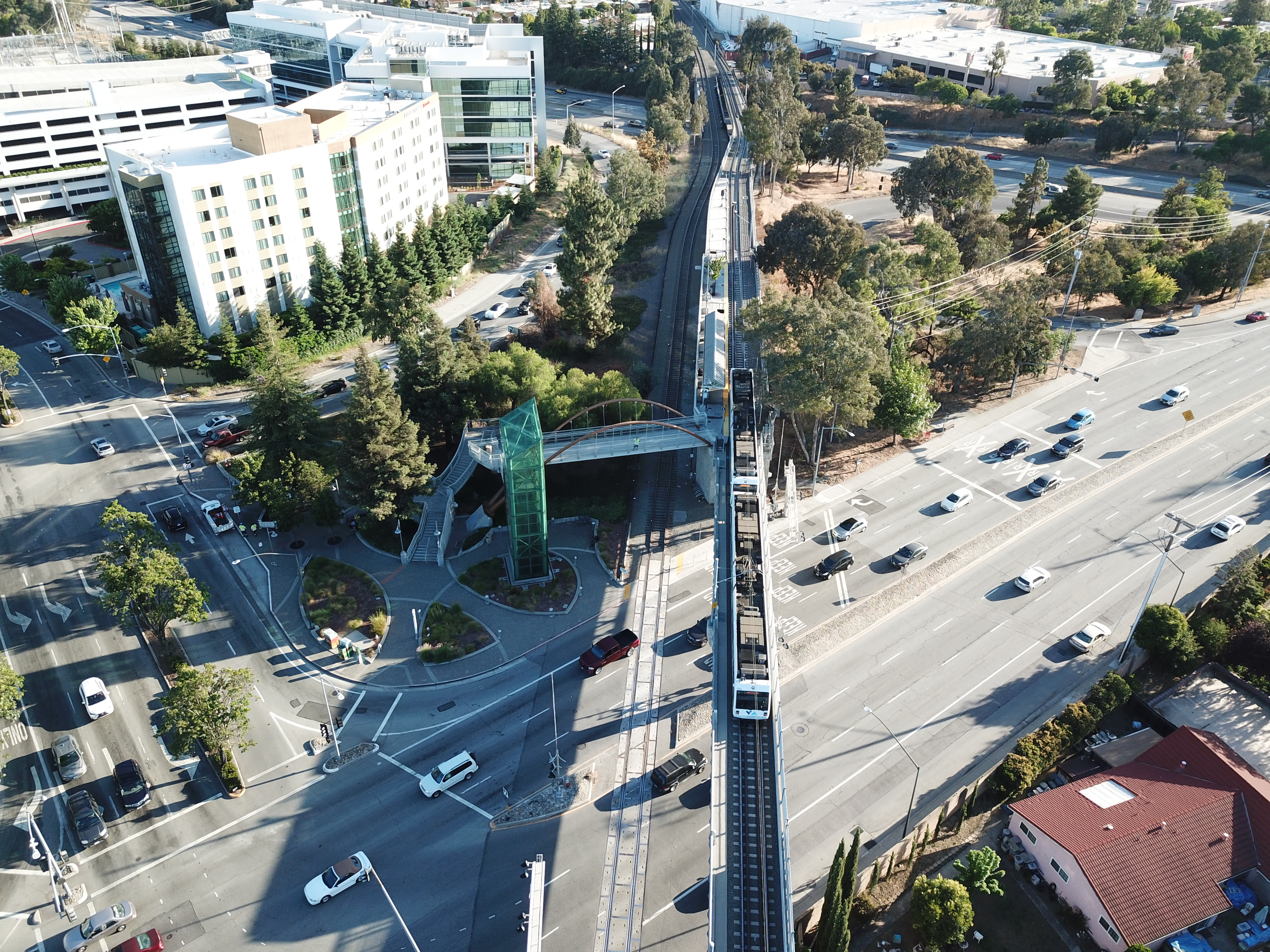
Aerial view of train entering Hamilton station, showing elevated platform, ground-level plaza and freight tracks

Hamilton station was built as part of the Vasona Light Rail extension project. This project extended VTA light rail service from the intersection of Woz Way and West San Carlos St in San Jose in a southwesterly direction to the Winchester station in western Campbell.

The official opening date for this station was October 1, 2005.

The construction of this station and the rest of the Vasona Light Rail extension was part of the 1996 Measure B Transportation Improvement Program. Santa Clara County voters approved the Measure B project in 1996 along with a half-percent sales tax increase. The Vasona Light Rail extension was funded mostly by the resulting sales tax revenues with additional money coming from federal and state funding, grants, VTA bond revenues, and municipal contributions.

== Platforms and tracks ==
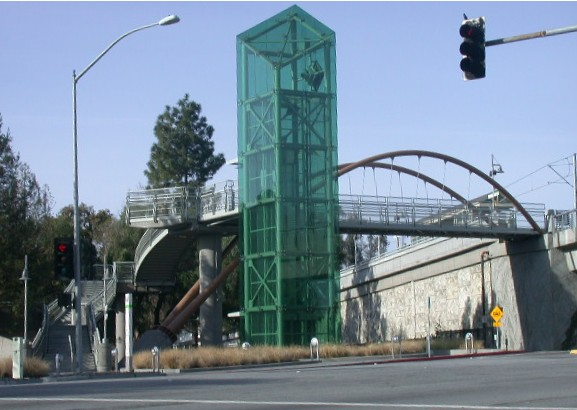
Hamilton station as seen from street level

Hamilton station has a dramatic glass elevator enclosure and a distinctive pedestrian bridge that provides access to the platform and improves the station's aesthetics.

There is no public art currently on display at this station.
