= Earl and Virginia Young House =

Historic house in California, United States

- U.S. National Register of Historic Places
- Young-Sartorette House
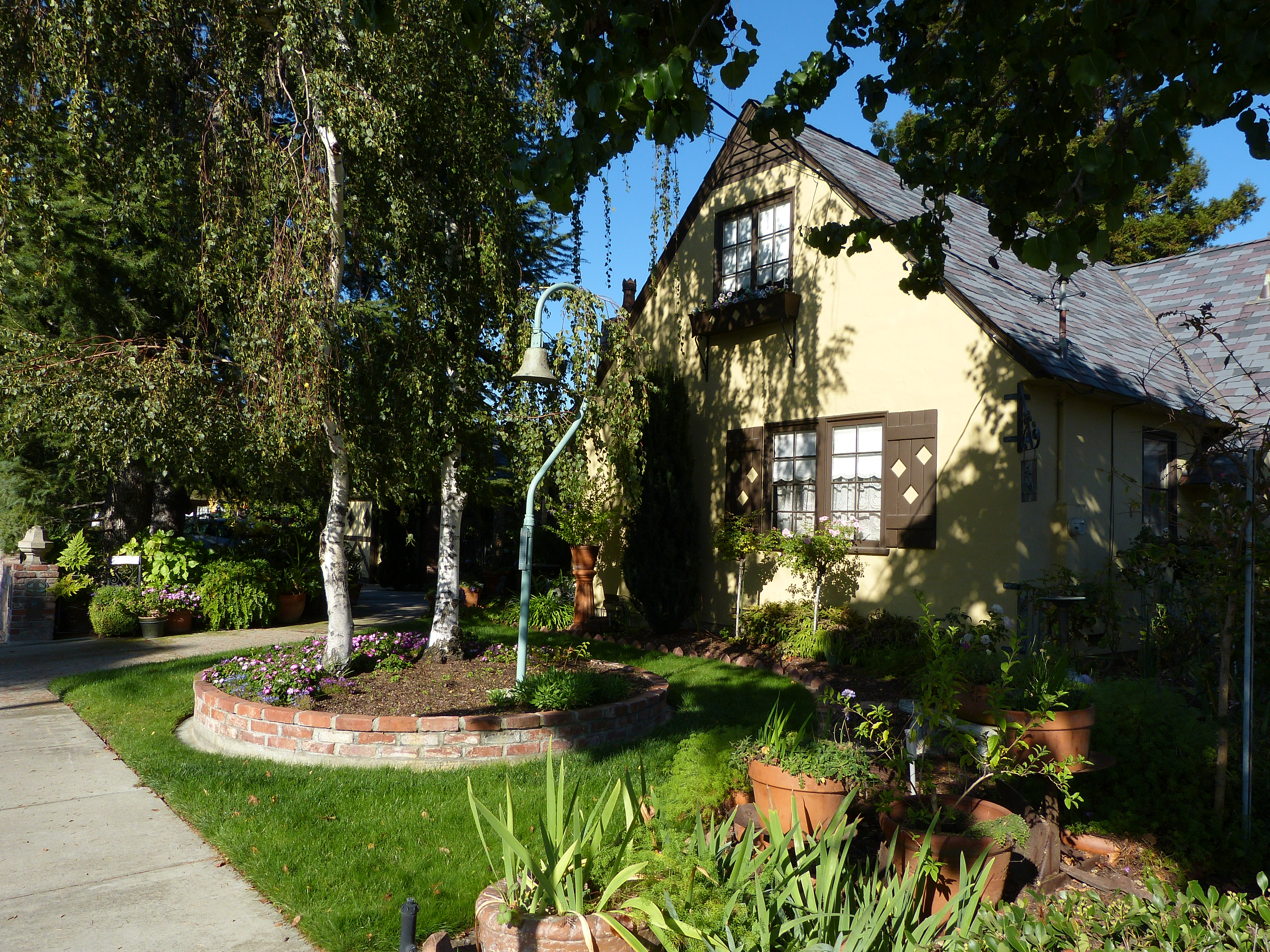
- Earl and Virginia Young House in 2012

- Location within San Jose, California
- Location: 1888 White Oaks Road, Campbell, California, US
- Coordinates: 37°15′39″N 121°56′55″W
- Area: 0.5 acres (0.20 ha)
- Built: 1928
- Architect: Benjamin H. Painter
- Architectural style: Vernacular Tudor Revival
- NRHP reference No.: 08001279
- Added to NRHP: January 8, 2009

The Earl and Virginia Young House, also known as the Young-Sartorette House, stands as a historic residence in Campbell, California. Constructed in 1928, it served as the home for Earl Young, a successful orchard farmer in the Santa Clara Valley, and his family. The house is historically significant in the Tudor Revival architectural style, which gained popularity in the mid-twentieth century. In 1981, the Herz family relocated both the house and garage to prevent them from potential demolition. The Young-Sartorette House was placed on the National Register of Historic Places on January 8, 2009.

== History ==
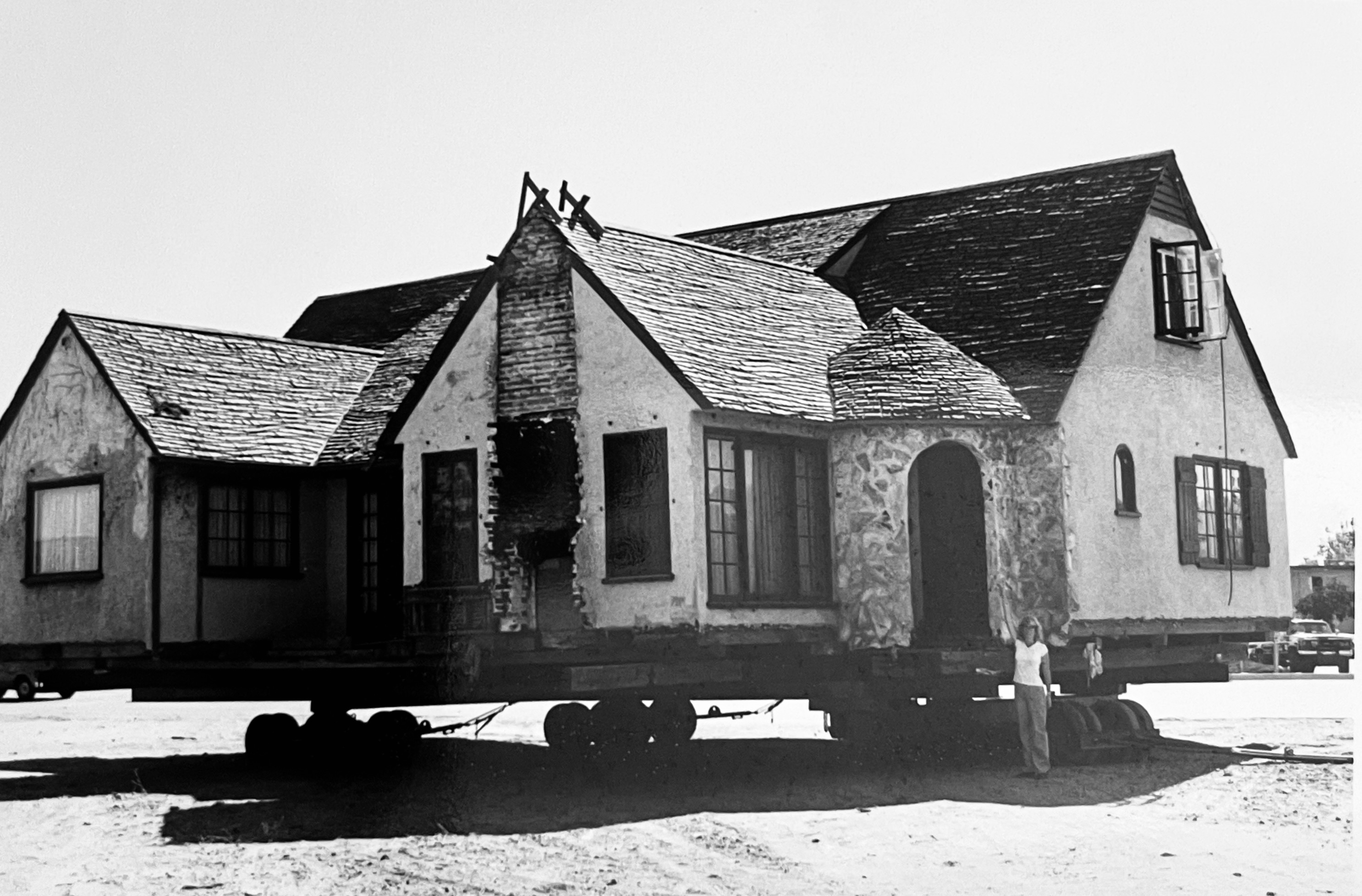
Moving the Young-Sartorette House in 1981 with Joanna Herz at front door.

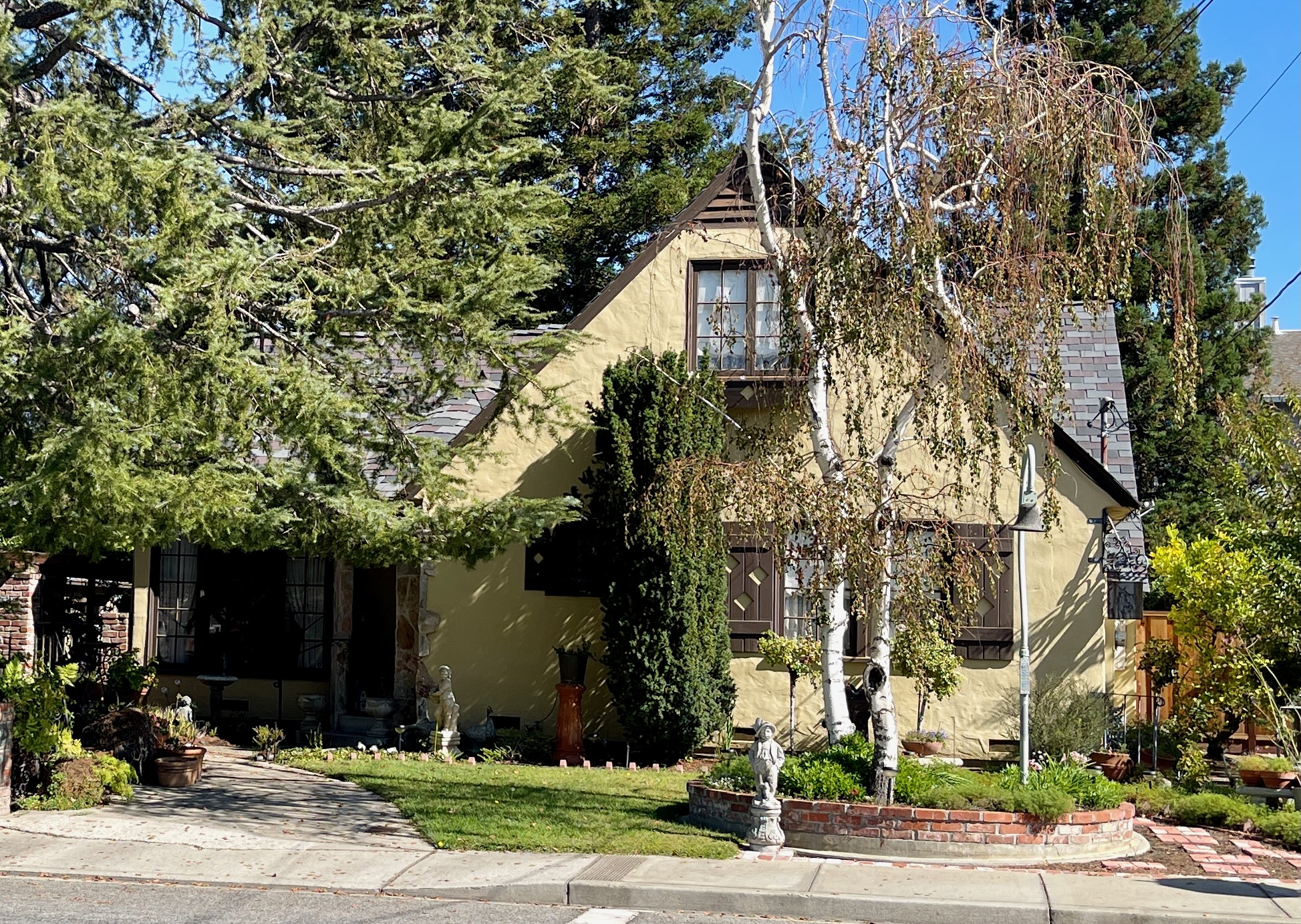
Street View of the Young-Sartorette House on 1888 White Oaks Road.

In 1928, Earl Young acquired a parcel of land from his brother for the sum of $10 (equivalent to $188 in 2025). He was a local farmer, insurance agent, and Vice President of the California Prune and Apricot Growers Association. He then engaged architect and builder Benjamin H. Painter to oversee the construction of a residence. This property, amidst orchards rather than being close to town, served as both a family home and a business office. The land was bordered on one side by the primary road connecting San Jose and Santa Cruz, originally known as the Old Santa Clara and Los Gatos Road, and later renamed Bascom Avenue. White Oaks Road, formerly part of the Old Santa Clara and Los Gatos Road, marked another boundary of the property. The Bascom Avenue location would prove to be strategically central for the property's future value. Even with the advent of Highway 17, the original roadways continue to play essential roles as major thoroughfares for the communities of Campbell, Los Gatos, and San Jose.

The house changed hands, passing to Collette and Charley Sartorette in 1946, who raised horses on the property. The original location of the house was 14301 S. Bascom Avenue. In 1979, the house faced the threat of demolition due to a zoning change from agriculture to planned development. This action cleared the area for commercial use. In that year, the house was added to the Santa Clara County Heritage Inventory. The new owner, a developer, required to offer the house for free on the condition that they buy a vacant lot and move the house. Relocating the house was the sole means of preserving it. In 1980, the current owners, Joanna, and Rudolf "Rudy" Herz, made the decision to purchase the property from the Sartorette family. In 1981, the Herz family took on the task of relocating 2,500-square-foot (230 m^{2}) residence, moving it a distance of 700 ft (210 m) to the west, onto a smaller lot within the same property. Additionally, they repositioned the home 180 degrees, now fronting White Oaks Road. Unfortunately, the interior and exterior plaster sustained damage during the relocation process. A retired plasterer, Joe Aruta, restored the walls. The restoration of the house and garage was successfully completed in 1985.

On April 29, 2018, the Herz family organized a historic house tour of the Young-Sartorette property, with the proceeds from the event benefiting the Campbell Museums.

== Design ==
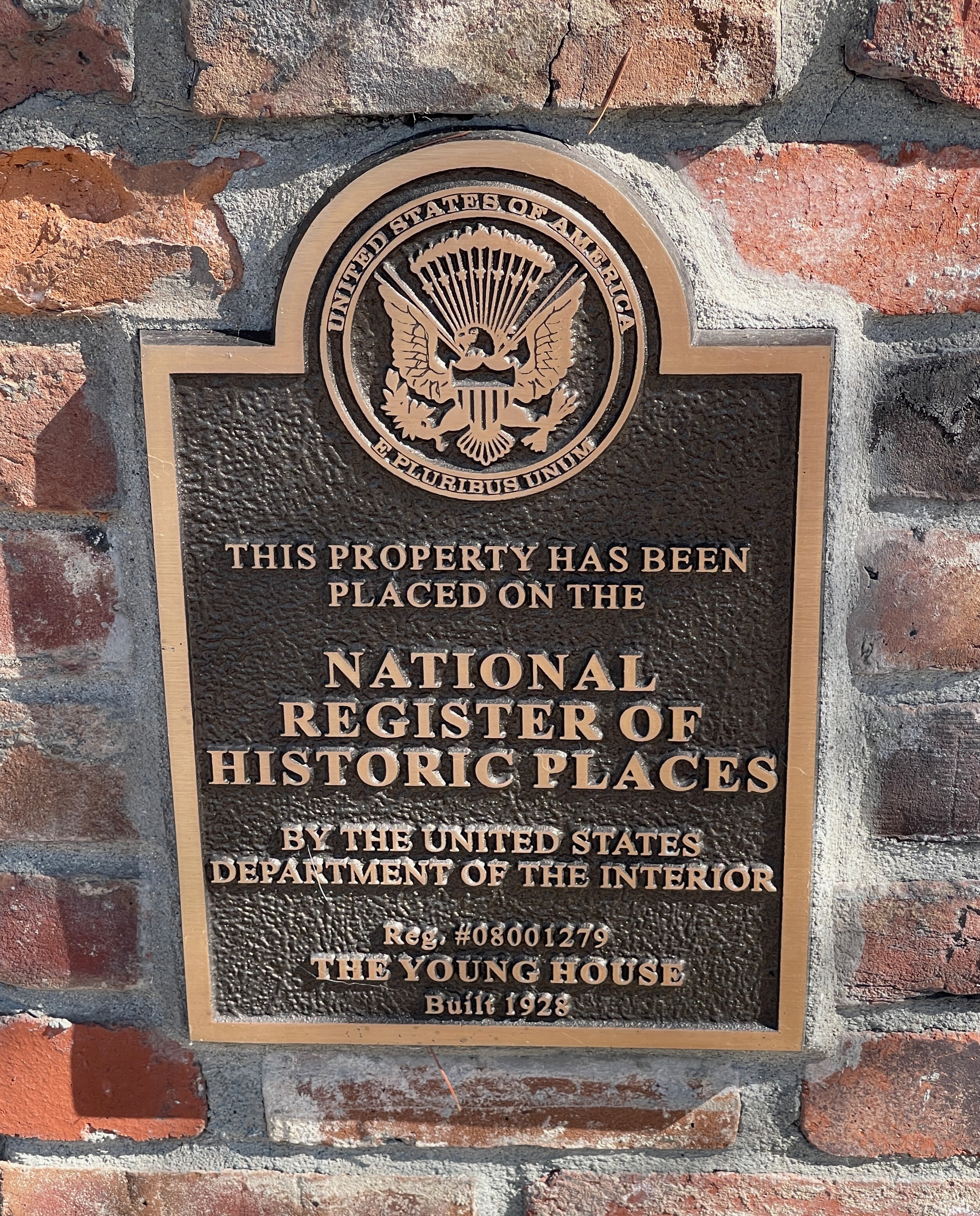
National Register of Historic Places plaque

The Earl and Virginia Young House, constructed in 1928, is a Tudor Revival residence, featuring a one-and-a-half-story layout and spanning approximately 2,500-square-foot (230 m^{2}). Its facade is defined by one of five steeply pitched gable roofs, with a rounded arched doorway with a board-and-batten front door framed by large stones and stucco, and a turret crowning the recessed entryway. The exterior has stone corners beneath the textured stucco, and a chimney rising from a brick-capped fireplace. The house itself is crafted from locally sourced redwood, both in its interior and exterior walls, which are constructed with lath and plaster. Inside, the house retains its original heavy-textured plaster walls with bullnoses. The cathedral-ceiling living room and terracotta-tile fireplace with a keystone bas-relief. The first floor of the house consists of a living room, a formal dining room, a kitchen, a separate breakfast room, a mud room, a full bathroom, two bedrooms, and an office.

The residence retains its original materials and details, including wide plank, pegged hardwood floors and unpainted wood trim. Original tall and narrow windows are arranged in multiple clusters with multi-pane glazing. While a new imitation slate roof has been added for safety and insurance purposes, it includes copper flashing, gutters, and downspouts. The two-car garage, crafted in a style and materials similar with the house, is situated to the left of the house, is accessible via a driveway curving past the front entry or directly from the street. The property is shielded from both the street and neighboring properties by clusters of trees and landscaped gardens. A weathered brick wall further encloses the cedar grove in the front of the house.

The house and garage, set back twenty-five feet from the street, are set on a 7,470-square-foot (694 m^{2}) parcel within a residential area that was once a thriving prune and apricot orchard with significant economic connections to the local Campbell canneries. Both the house and the garage face the White Oaks Road. Square columns made of weathered bricks, which frame wrought-iron gates, provide support for a wooden arbor and patio between the house and the garage. In the rear, an additional arbor, attached to the house, creates an outdoor seating area that centers around a small raised fishpond, with aged brickwork.

== Historical significance ==
The Earl and Virginia Young House is historically significant according to the National Register of Historic Places criterion A, in Architecture due to its representation of the Tudor Revival residential design. The period of historical significance is marked by its construction in 1928. The house adheres to the features of Tudor Revival style, including its steeply pitched roof, tall and slender windows, the turret, and its stucco siding. Furthermore, it aligns with criterion B, pertaining to area of Moved Properties, since both the house and garage, with their architectural qualities, were relocated to avert potential demolition.

The Earl & Virginia Young House achieved Campbell Historic Landmark status in 1981 when the City of Campbell awarded the Young-Sartorette memorial plaque, officially recognizing it as a Campbell Historic landmark. In 1999, the Earl & Virginia Young House secured recertification and was designated as the sixth entry on the Santa Clara County Heritage Inventory within the city of Campbell. The property has been placed on the National Register of Historic Places by the United States Department of the Interior on January 8, 2009.

== Gallery ==
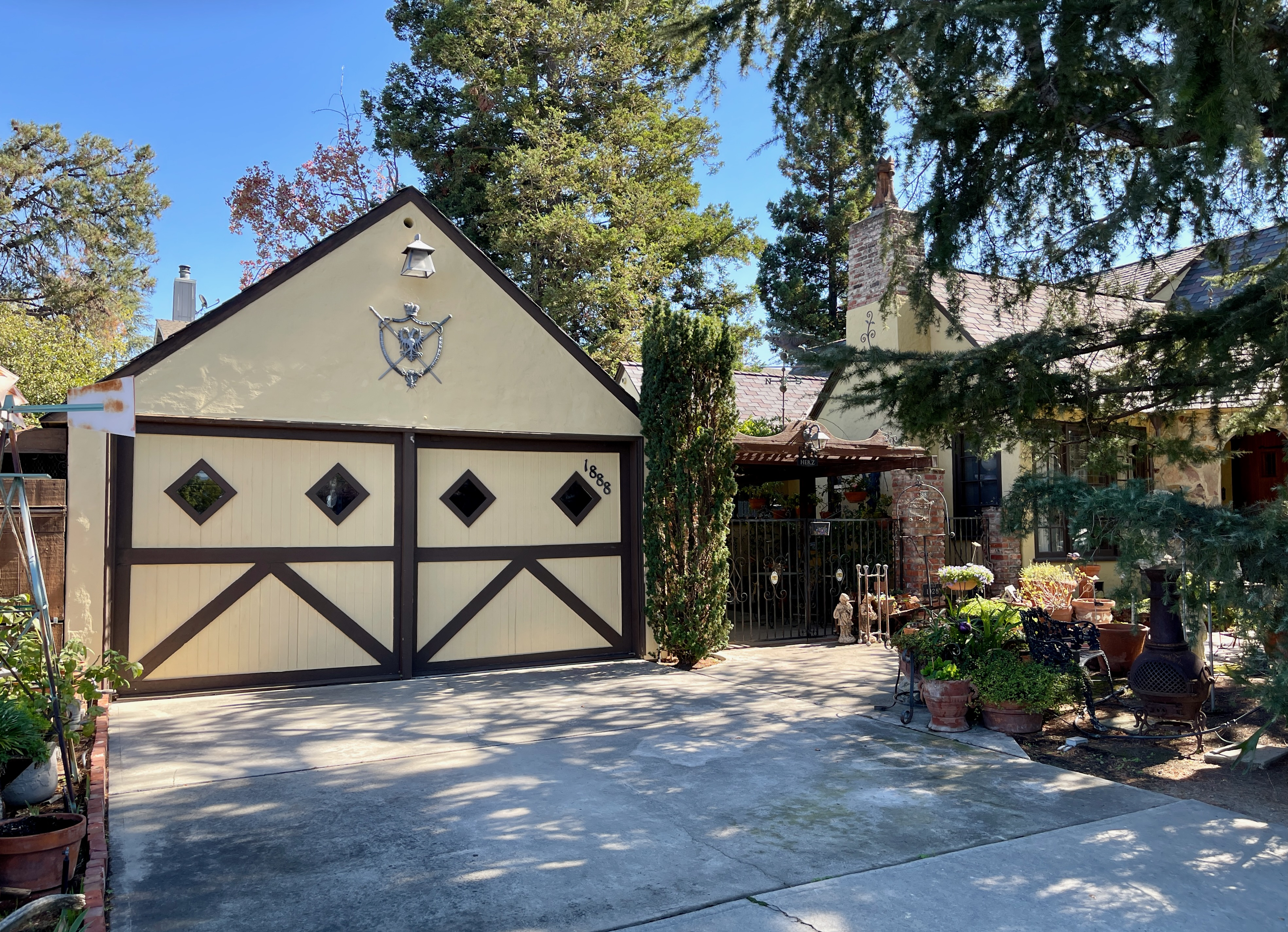
Young House Garage

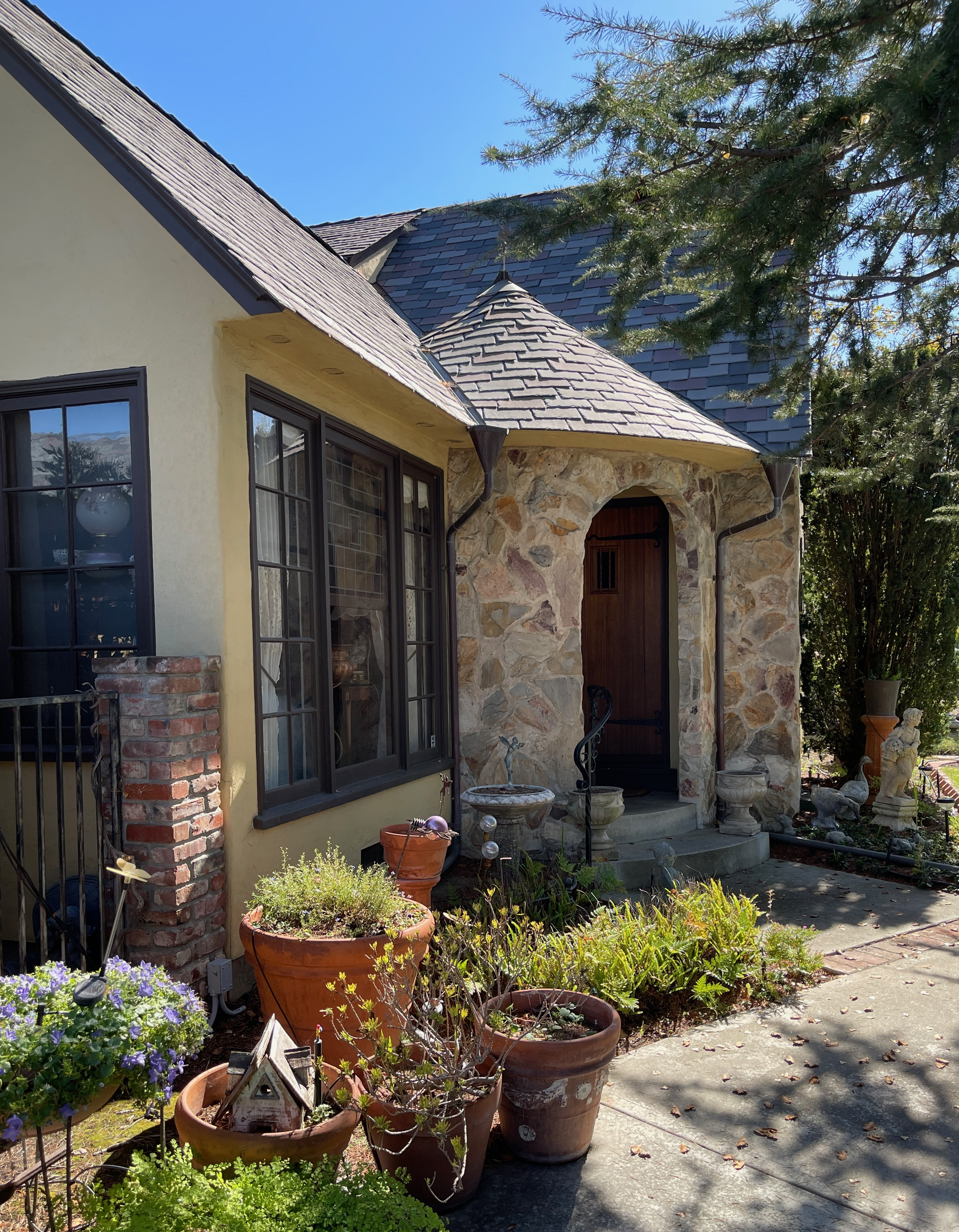
Front door framed by large stones and a turret

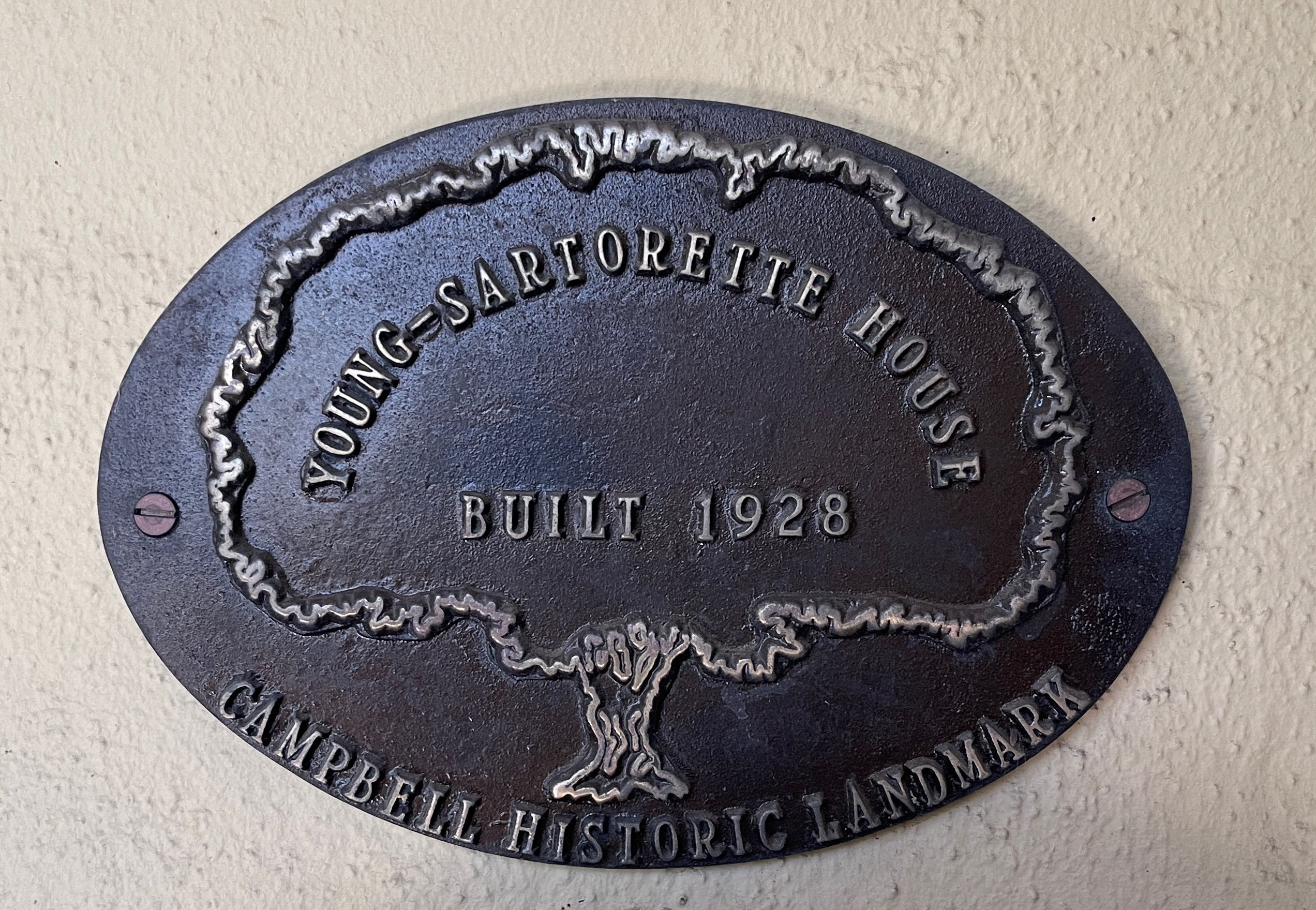
Campbell Historic Landmark plaque

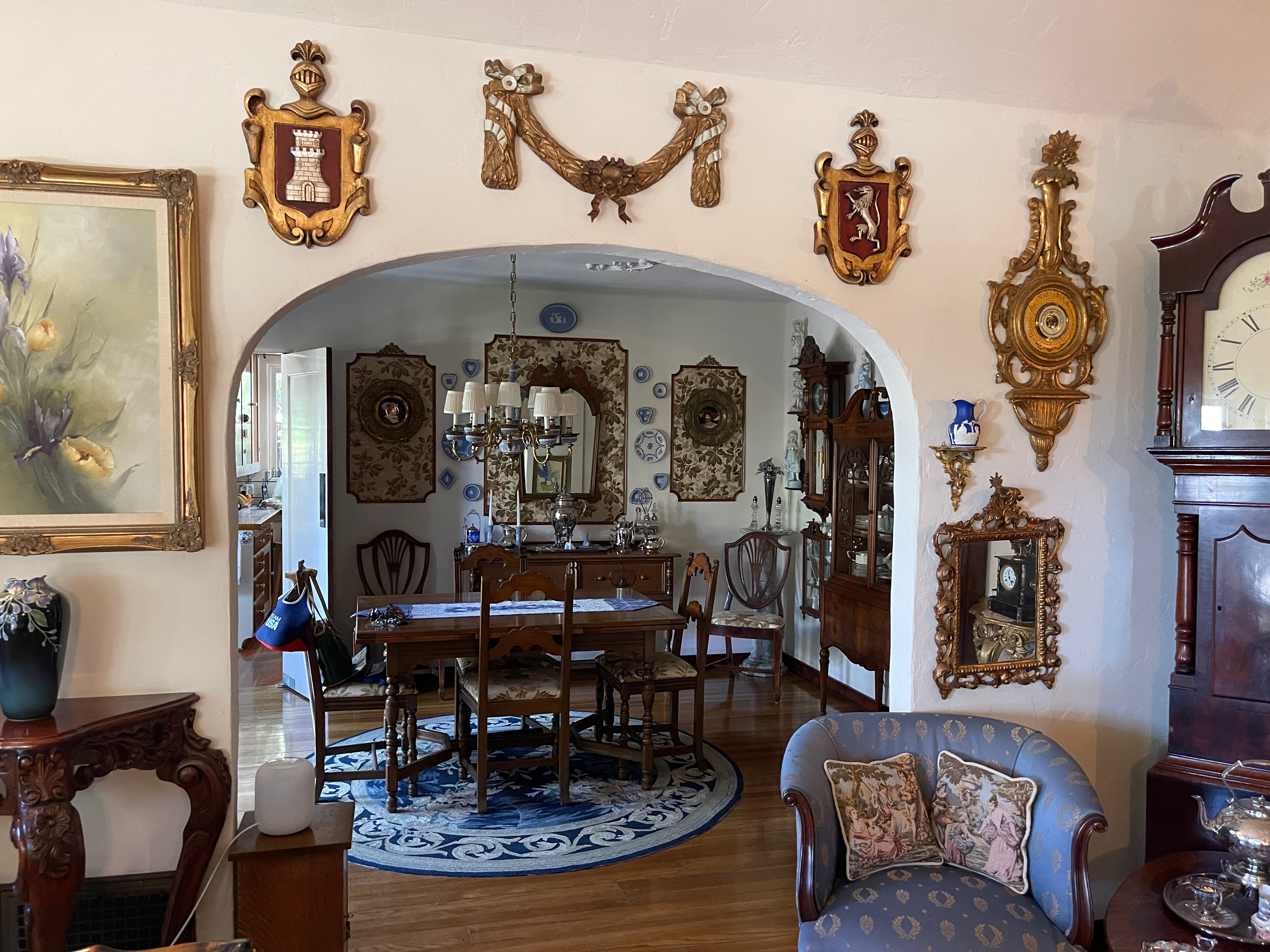
Formal dining room at Young House

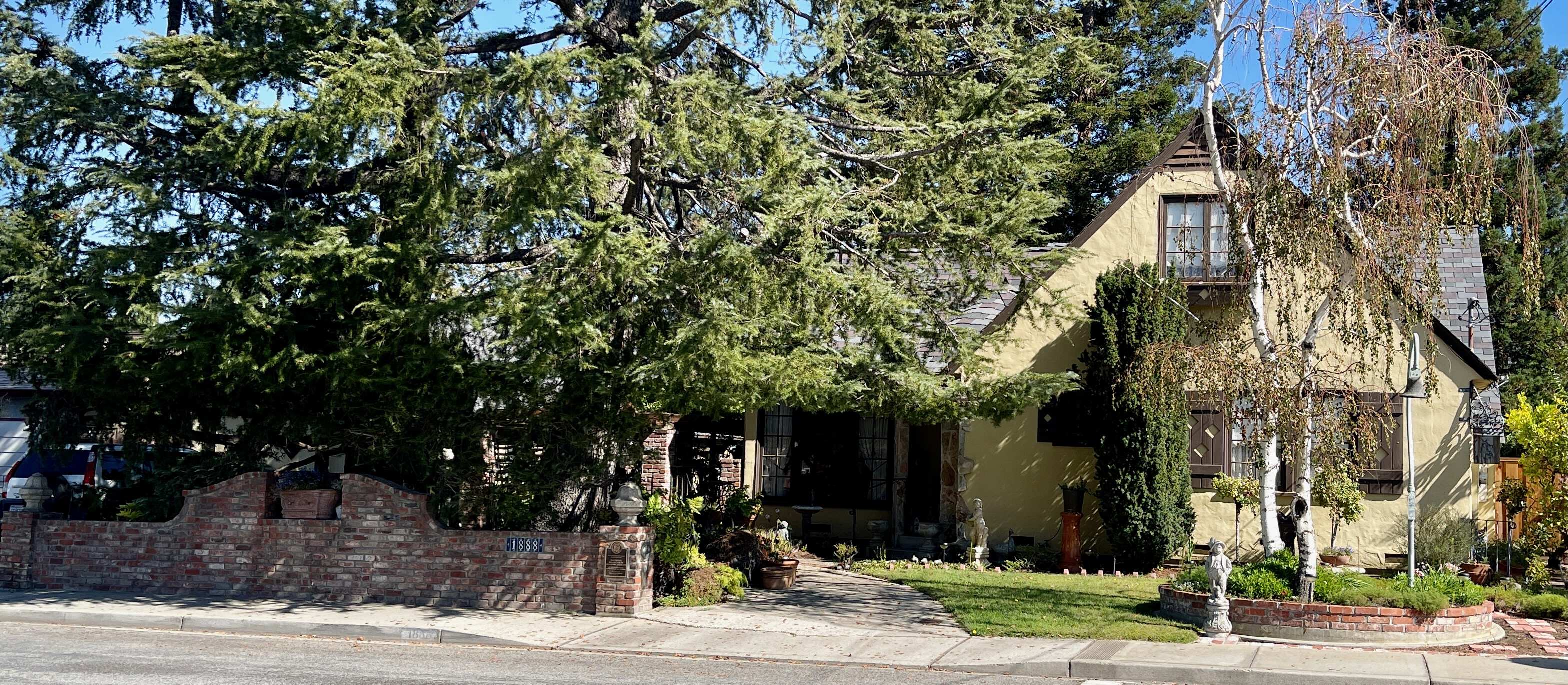
Young House street view

== See also ==
- List of cities and towns in California
- California Historical Landmarks in Santa Clara County
