= Downtown Campbell station =

VTA light rail station in Campbell, California

Downtown Campbell
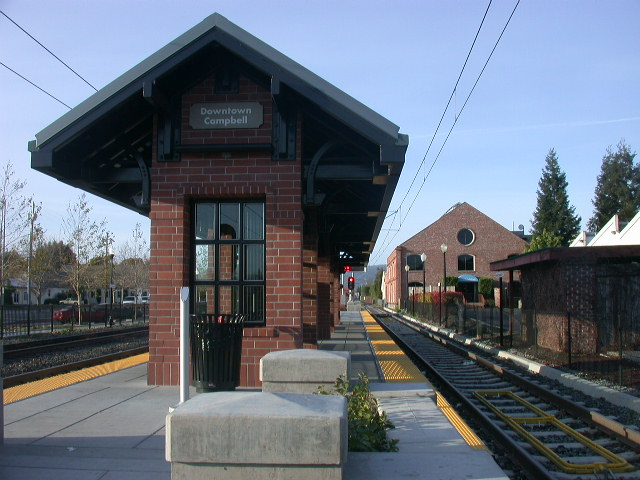
- Downtown Campbell station looking southwest along the platform

General information
- Location: 175 Railway Avenue; Campbell, California
- Coordinates: 37°17′09″N 121°56′36″W
- Owner: Santa Clara Valley Transportation Authority
- Platforms: 1 island platform
- Tracks: 2
- Connections: VTA Bus: 26

Construction
- Accessible: Yes

History
- Opened: October 1, 2005

Services
Preceding station	VTA	Following station
Hamilton toward Old Ironsides	Green Line	Winchester Terminus
Former services
Preceding station	Southern Pacific Railroad	Following station
San Jose Terminus	San Jose – Santa Cruz	Vasona Junction toward Santa Cruz
Terminus	New Almaden Narrow Gauge Branch	Los Gatos & San Jose Road toward New Almaden
Location

Downtown Campbell station is a Santa Clara Valley Transportation Authority (VTA) light rail station, located in downtown Campbell, California. Downtown Campbell station contains one island platform, and marks the beginning of a double-track section which continues to the end of line, Winchester station in western Campbell. The station is served by the Green Line of the VTA light rail system.

== Layout ==
=== Location ===
Downtown Campbell station is located at the intersection of Railway Avenue and Orchard City Drive. The station is located in the middle of Historic Downtown Campbell with many local shops, restaurants and services. Campbell Park is located about three blocks away, as is the Los Gatos Creek Trail trailhead.

=== Platforms and tracks ===
The station's platform shelter is architecturally unique as compared with the other shelters used in the system. The shelter features a brick facade and a roofline that blends more naturally with the surrounding buildings. This is one of the many VTA Light Rail stations that only fits two cars.

There is no public art currently on display at this station.

=== Parking ===
The station features two parking lots. One parking lot is located at the intersection of Orchard City Drive and Railway Ave. The other parking lot is located off Railway Ave adjacent to the station.

== History ==
The Downtown Campbell station was constructed as part of the Vasona Extension. It was dedicated August 12, 2005, but was not opened for revenue service until October 1, 2005, due to the delay in obtaining waiver from Federal Railroad Administration.

This site is where Campbell's first train station was located: the Lovelady station. South Pacific Coast Railroad established the site in 1877 as a rail spur where gravel for track ballast could be acquired. Initially a flag stop, the station consisted of little more than a platform. Lovelady was selected as the mainline connection point for the railroad's Almaden branch, which opened in 1886. The station had become known as Campbell by 1890.
