= List Biological Laboratories =

- Company type: Private
- Industry: Biotechnology
- Founded: 1978
- Headquarters: Campbell, California, United States
- Products: Bacterial Toxins; Research Reagents
- Services: Contract Manufacturing
- Website: www.listlabs.com

List Biological Laboratories, also known as List Labs, is a US biotechnology company producing bacterial toxins. Its products are involved in vaccine development, toxin research and infectious disease research worldwide.

== History ==
List Labs was founded in 1978 by Linda Shoer, and is headquartered in Campbell, California.

Starting with cholera, the firm developed bacterial proteins for research. When the firm was founded, and for many years after, it was the only manufacturer and supplier for several bacterial exotoxins and lipopolysaccharides (LPS).

In 2015 the firm performed a technology transfer of botulinum toxin manufacturing process to Allergan (for the product now known as Botox). It manufactured the first human grade lipopolysaccaride product for clinical trial use, commissioned by the NIH. It was one of the first companies worldwide to manufacture live microbiomes for clinical trial starting in 2012.
