= Ainsley House =

Historic house in California, United States

- John Colpitts Ainsley House No. 3
- U.S. National Register of Historic Places
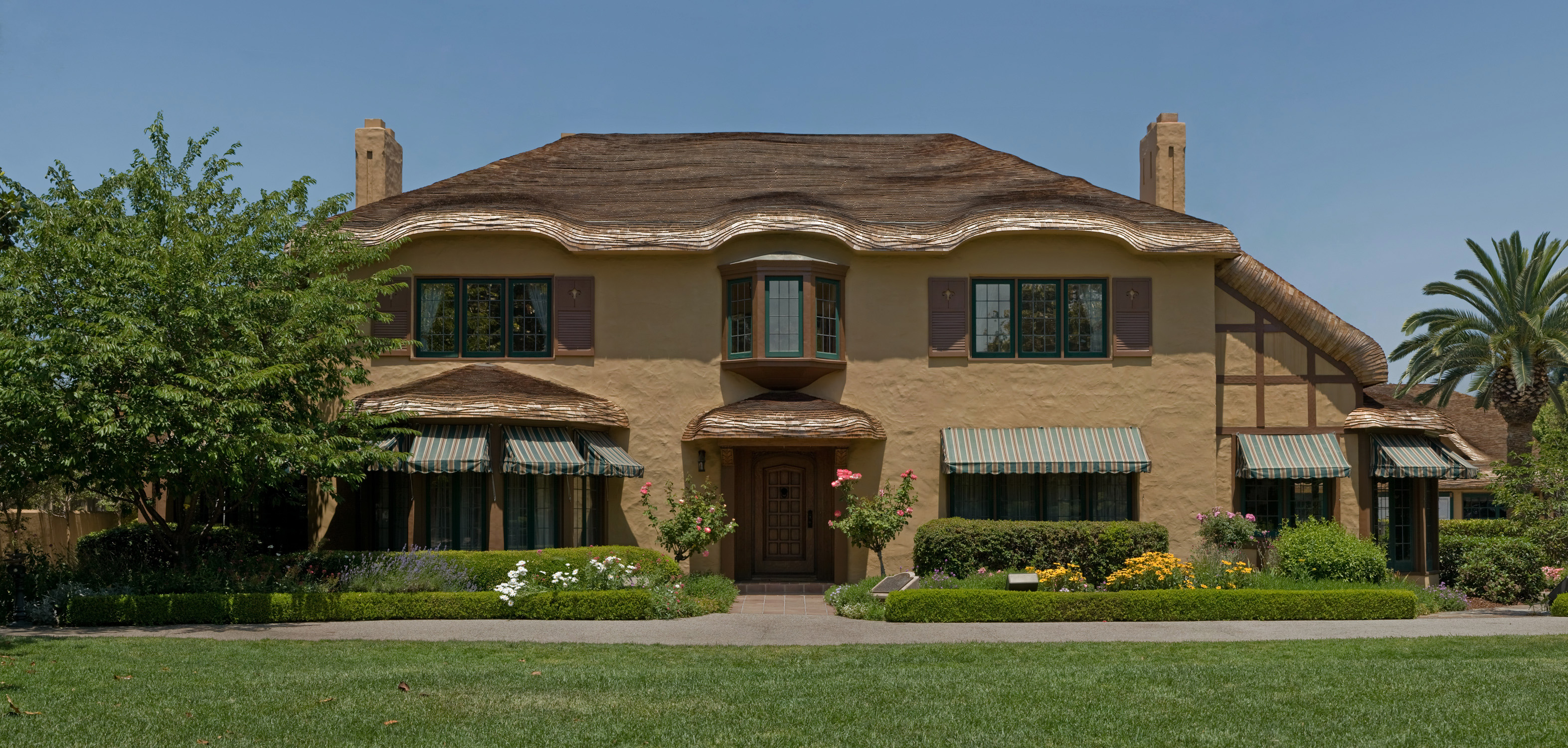

- Location within San Jose, California Location within California Location within the United States
- Location: 300 Grant St., Campbell, California
- Coordinates: 37°17′19″N 121°56′37″W
- Area: 1.1 acres (0.45 ha)
- Built: 1925
- Architect: Addison M. Whiteside of Whiteside-Davidson Construction Co.
- Architectural style: Bungalow/craftsman, Arts and Crafts
- NRHP reference No.: 05001086
- Added to NRHP: October 3, 2005

Ainsley House is a 1925 California Arts and Crafts house in Campbell, California, built in the style of an English Tudor Cotswold cottage. The house and accompanying carriage house (now the Wyland R. Morgan Gallery) were listed on the National Register of Historic Places in 2005. It is now a museum and is open to the public.

The house was the third home of Campbell canning pioneer John Colpitts Ainsley (1860–1937) and his wife, Alcinda (1875-1939), and was originally located on the southwest corner of their 83-acre (340,000 m^{2}) orchard at the northeast corner of Hamilton and Johnson (now Bascom) Avenues. After J.C. Ainsley's death in 1937, Alcinda left the house, living with friends until her death in 1939. The house remained in the family, but with the exception of occasional Christmas seasons and social events over the years, was vacant, though well-tended, for decades. The Ainsley family donated the house, its furnishings and the carriage house to the City of Campbell in 1989 and they were moved to their present location at 300 Grant Street in Downtown Campbell in 1990. The house museum, Morgan Gallery and nearby Campbell Historical Museum are supported by the Campbell Historical Museum and Ainsley House Foundation.

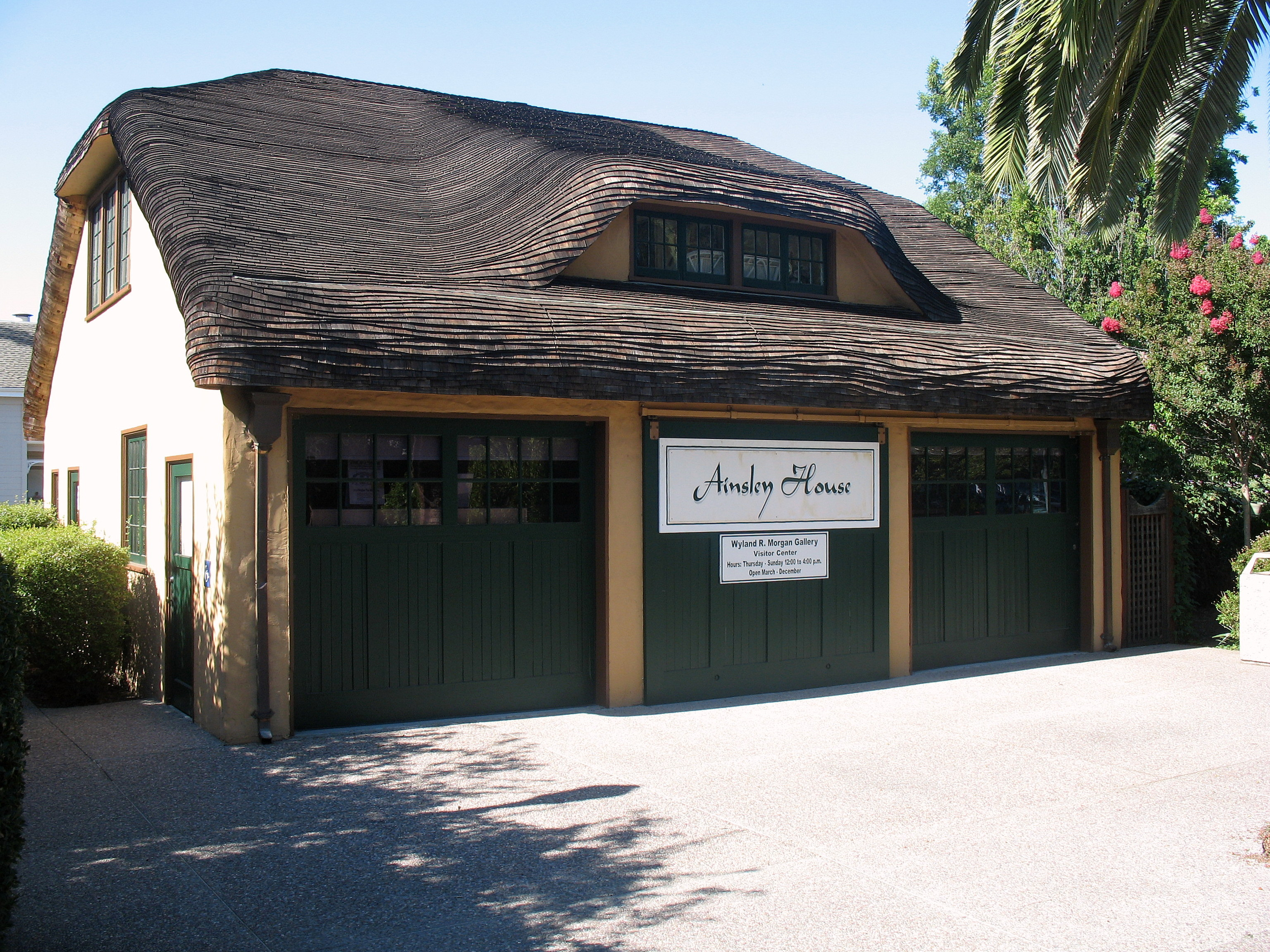
Carriage house (Morgan Gallery)
