= Pruneyard Shopping Center =

Shopping mall in Campbell, California, US

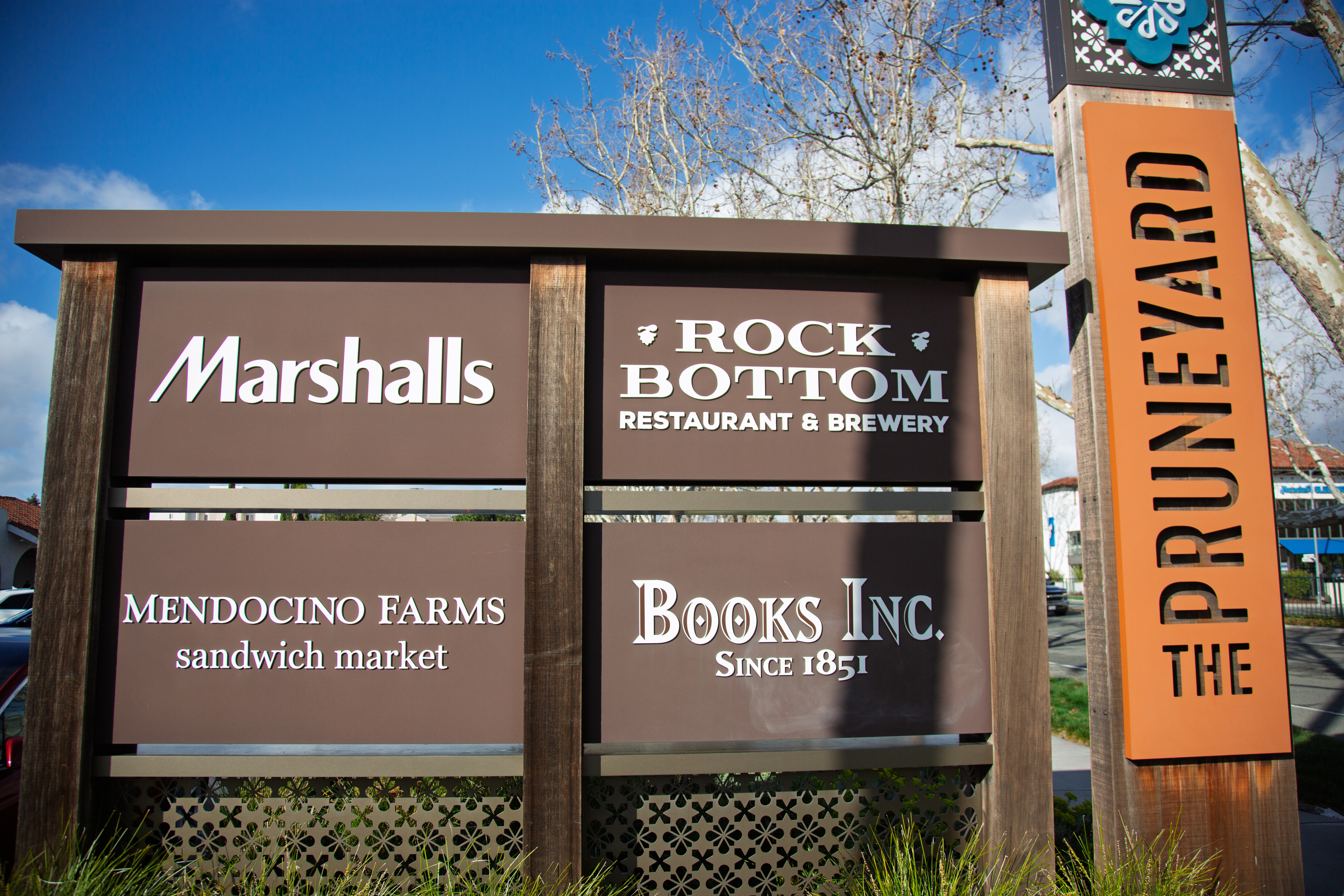
- Roadside sign for The Pruneyard Shopping Center
- Location: Campbell, California, United States
- Coordinates: 37.28908°N 121.93399°W
- Address: 1875 S Bascom Ave #405
- Opened: 1964; 62 years ago
- Developer: The Hahn Company
- Manager: Regency Centers
- Owner: Regency Centers
- Num. of stores: 236
- Num. of anchor tenants: 3
- Floor area: 250,000 sq ft (23,000 m^{2})
- Floors: 1
- Parking: 7,692
- Website: thepruneyard.com

The Pruneyard Shopping Center is a 250,000 sq ft (23,000 m^{2}) open-air shopping center located in Campbell, California, at the intersection of Campbell Avenue and Bascom Avenue, just east of State Route 17. It was built in the 1960s as the PruneYard Shopping Center. It includes shops, a DoubleTree by Hilton inn, a movie theater originally built in 1964, and three office towers built in 1970, one of which is the tallest building in the area outside of downtown San Jose.

== History ==
Fred Sahadi developed the PruneYard Shopping Center as part of a mixed-use development on the site of the Brynteson Ranch, which he bought in 1968. It was completed in 1970, designed to be an upscale shopping center. In 2014 Ellis Partners and Fortress Investment Group LLC bought it from Equity Office.

A major renovation and expansion began in 2017. The movie theater, the first business to open in the mall in 1969 as the three-screen United Artists Movie Theater, was renovated at the turn of the 21st century and became Camera 7; it closed in April 2017 and reopened in April 2018 as the Pruneyard Cinemas, with cocktails delivered to patrons' seats and the Cedar Room restaurant in the former location of Boswell's, a 1970s fern bar.

The Pruneyard was bought by Regency Centers in 2019. There are plans to add another office building and more retail.

=== Pruneyard Shopping Center v. Robins ===
In the late 1970s, the mall was involved in a free speech dispute with local high school students that was ultimately decided by the U.S. Supreme Court on June 9, 1980. The Pruneyard case established two important rules in American constitutional law:

- Under the California Constitution, individuals may peacefully exercise their right to free speech in parts of private shopping centers regularly held open to the public, subject to reasonable regulations adopted by the shopping centers.
- Under the U.S. Constitution, states can provide their citizens with broader rights in their constitutions than under the federal Constitution, so long as those rights do not infringe on any federal constitutional rights.

== Gallery ==
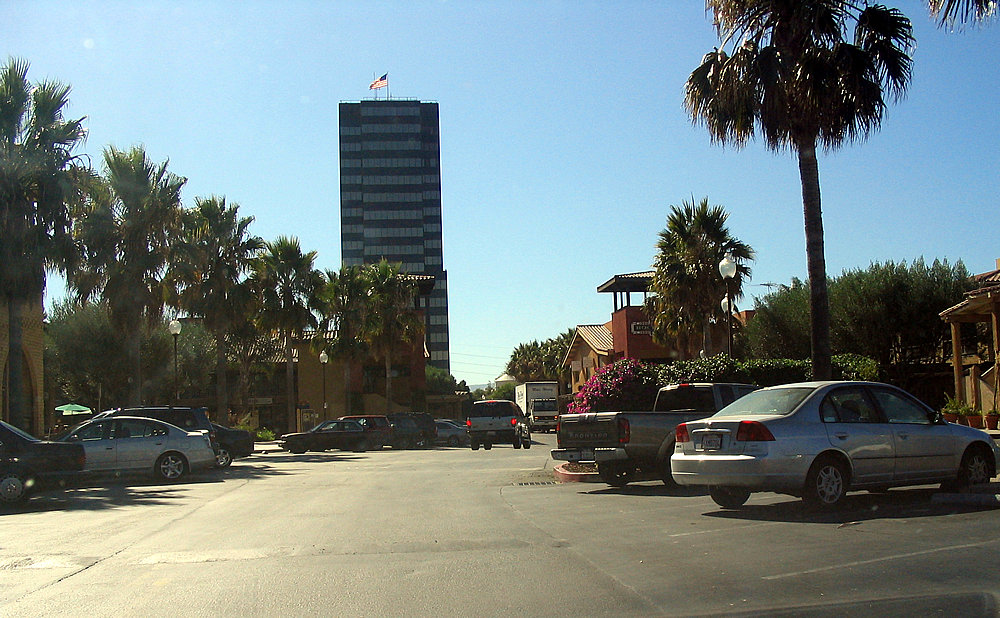
View across a parking lot of the tallest of the three towers

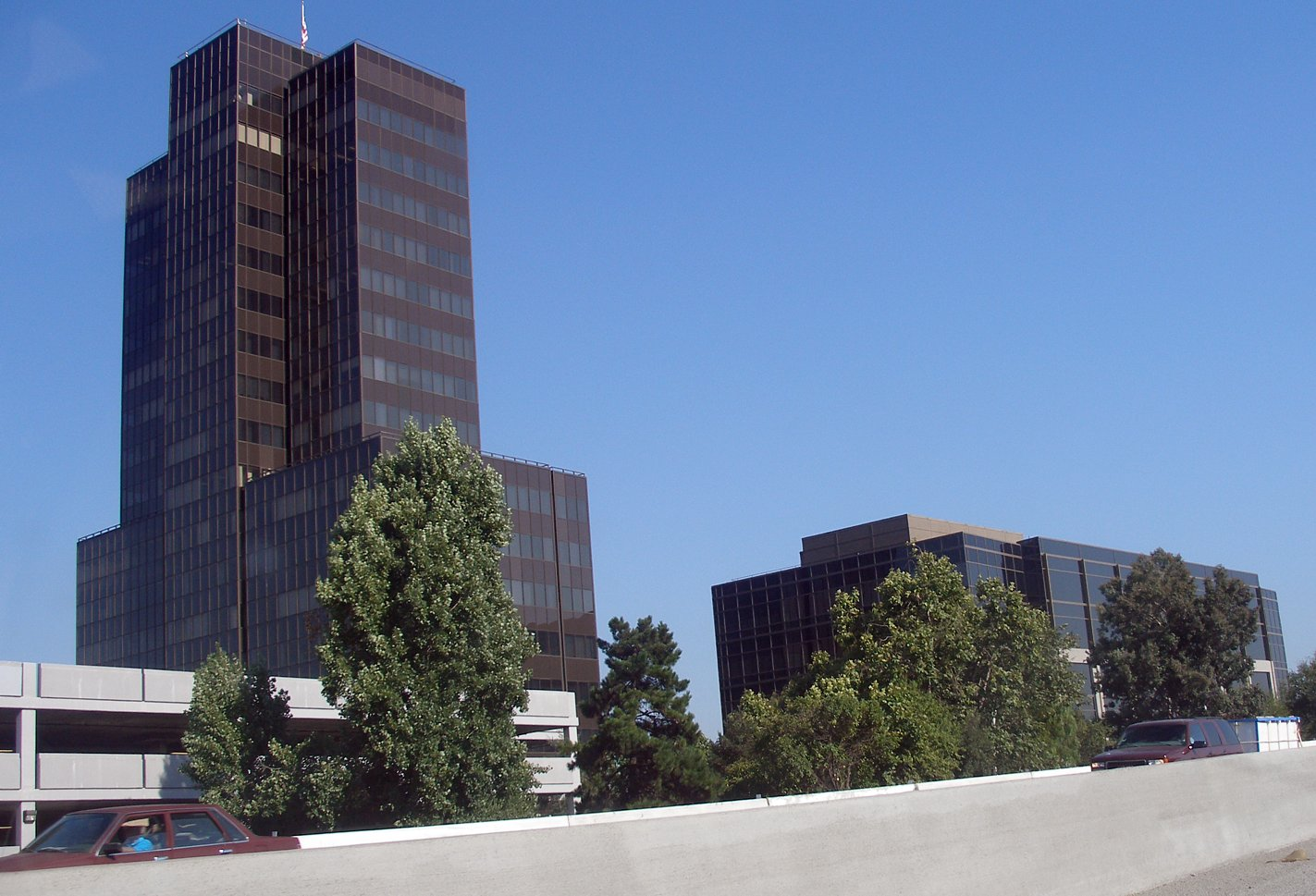
The towers as seen from Route 17

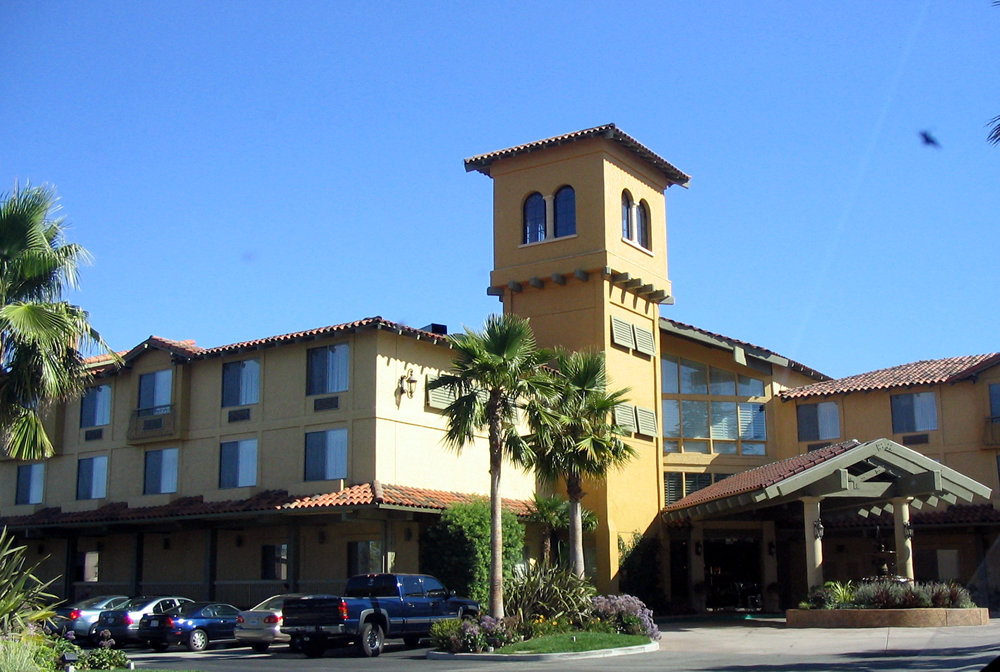
The inn

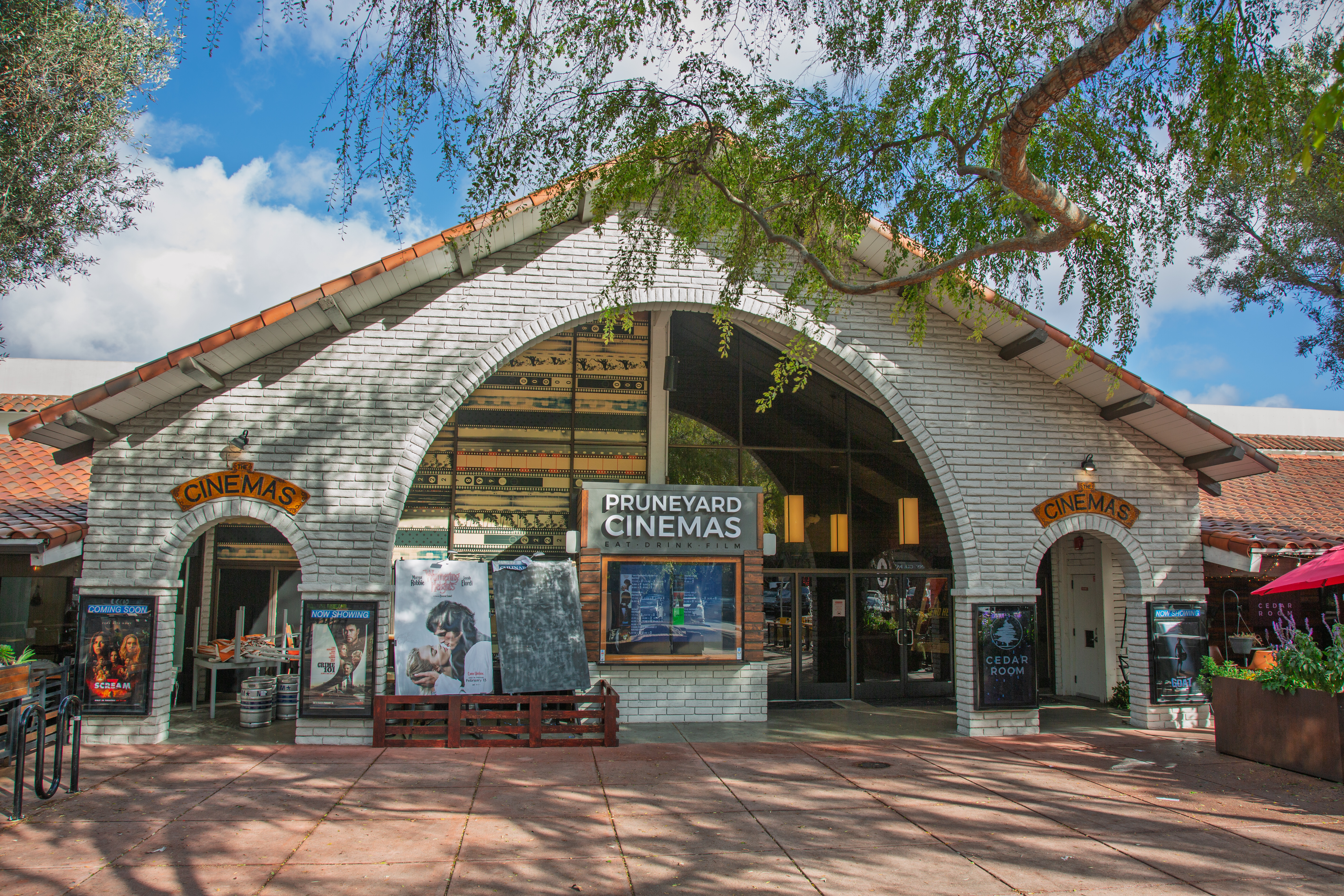
Entrance to the movie theater in 2026
