= Campbell, California =

City in California, United States

- City
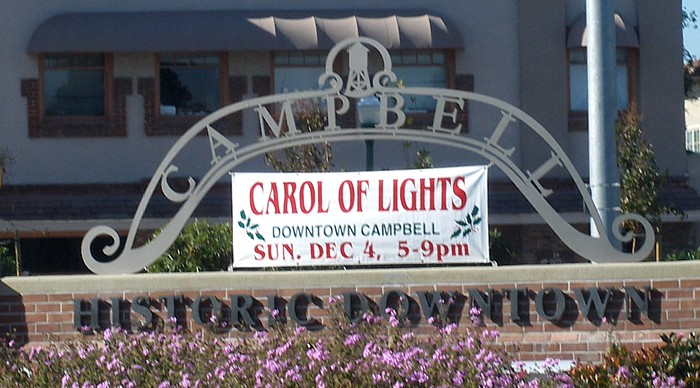
- Campbell's welcome sign

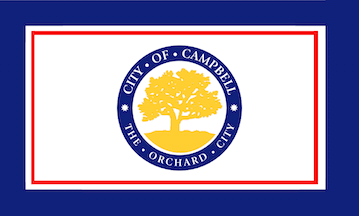
- Flag Seal
- Motto: The Orchard City
- Interactive map of Campbell, California
- Location in the United States Campbell, California (California) Campbell, California (the United States)
- Coordinates: 37°17′2″N 121°57′18″W
- Country: United States
- State: California
- County: Santa Clara
- Incorporated: March 28, 1952

Government
  - Type: Council-Manager
  - Mayor: Daniel E. Furtado
  - City manager: Brian Loventhal

Area
  - Total: 6.10 sq mi (15.8 km^{2})
  - Land: 6.08 sq mi (15.7 km^{2})
  - Water: 0.02 sq mi (0.052 km^{2})
- Elevation: 200 ft (61 m)

Population (2020)
  - Total: 43,959
  - Density: 7,229.3/sq mi (2,791.25/km^{2})
- Time zone: UTC−8 (Pacific)
  - Summer (DST): UTC−7 (PDT)
- ZIP codes: 95008, 95009, 95011
- Area codes: 408/669
- FIPS code: 06-10345
- GNIS feature IDs: 277483, 2409971
- Website: www.campbellca.gov

Campbell (/ˈkæm.bəl/) is a city in Santa Clara County, California, United States, in the San Francisco Bay Area. As of the 2020 census, Campbell's population was 43,959. The U.S. Census Bureau estimated Campbell's population at 42,490 as of July 1, 2025.

Campbell is home to the Pruneyard Shopping Center, a sprawling open-air retail complex which was involved in a famous Supreme Court case that established the extent of the right to free speech in California.

== History ==
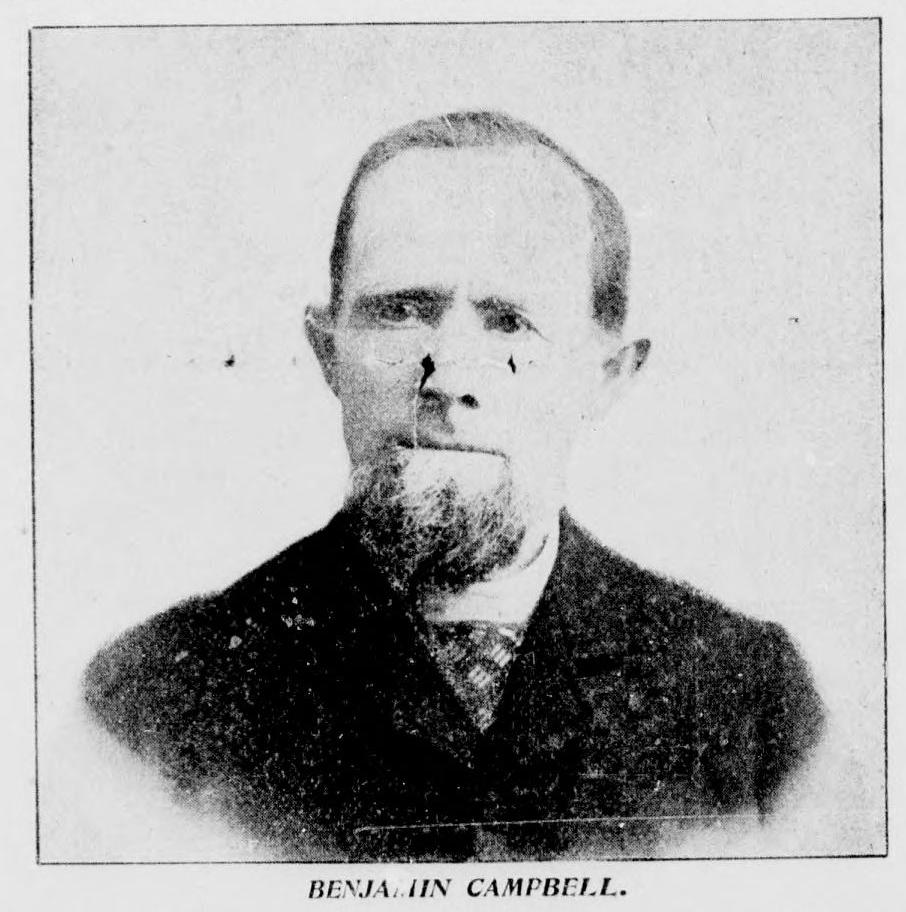
Benjamin Campbell (1826–1907)

=== Prior to the city ===
Prior to the founding of the neighborhood of Campbell, the land was occupied by the Ohlone, the Native American people of the Northern California coast.

About a third of present-day Campbell was part of the 1839 Alta California Rancho Rinconada de Los Gatos land grant. The northern extent of the grant land was along present-day Rincon Avenue, and across the north end of John D. Morgan Park in central Campbell.

=== Industrialization ===
The city was founded by Benjamin Campbell (1826–1907), after whom the city is named. Benjamin came to California in 1846 with his father, William M. Campbell I (1793–1885). William started a sawmill in Saratoga, and surveyed the cities of San Jose and Santa Clara. In 1851, Benjamin bought 160 acres (0.65 km^{2}) in southern Santa Clara Valley and cultivated hay and grain on it. This area later became Campbell's historical downtown core.

In 1878, Campbell sold his land for $5 an acre to a railroad company. By 1887, the first subdivision was recorded west of the railroad, from Campbell Avenue to the spot where the Water Tower Plaza now stands. He and his wife Mary (née Rucker) Campbell (1834–1913) founded the city which was first known as Campbell's Place, but would later become the town of Campbell.

In 1888, the Campbell School District was formed.

The area became the center for shipping fruit grown in the surrounding area, and within a short time, the drying grounds and canneries made Campbell an important rail center. By 1892, the Campbell Fruit Growers' Union became a well-known cooperative with its 17-acre (69,000 m^{2}) drying yard. J.C. Ainsley Packing Company, Hyde Cannery, and Payne Cannery were the main fruit packing companies.

In 1895, The Bank of Campbell was founded and the first newspaper, the Campbell Weekly Visitor, began publication.

Campbell was incorporated as a city in 1952. The city then grew rapidly as orchard lands disappeared, tract by tract. Today, Campbell is a suburban residential neighborhood in the southern part of the Santa Clara Valley.

== Geography ==
Campbell is bordered on the east and north by San Jose, on the south by Los Gatos, and on the west by a small portion of Saratoga.

According to the United States Census Bureau, the city has a total area of 6.10 square miles (15.8 km^{2}), of which 6.08 square miles (15.7 km^{2}) is land and 0.02 square miles (0.052 km^{2}) is water.

Of the total area, 0.32% is water, consisting of percolation ponds in Los Gatos Creek Park and in other locations; San Tomas Aquino Creek, which flows north on the west side of the city, is completely enclosed with fences and runs through concrete culverts; and Los Gatos Creek, which flows north-north-east on the east side of the city and has paths along both banks for hikers and joggers (locally called the "Perc Ponds"). Residents are able to reach Los Gatos by continuing on the creek trail. Downtown Campbell contains many local stores and shops, and every Sunday the downtown street close from 8am-1pm for a local farmers market.

State Route 17 runs roughly parallel to Los Gatos Creek on its eastern side; State Route 85 runs roughly east–west through Los Gatos just south of Campbell and cuts through the southwest corner of the city.

== Demographics ==
Historical population
Census	Pop.	Note	%±
1960	11,863		—
1970	23,797		100.6%
1980	26,843		12.8%
1990	36,048		34.3%
2000	38,138		5.8%
2010	39,349		3.2%
2020	43,959		11.7%
U.S. Decennial Census

=== 2020 census ===
As of the 2020 census, Campbell had a population of 43,959. The median age was 39.3 years. 19.9% of residents were under the age of 18 and 14.6% of residents were 65 years of age or older. For every 100 females there were 96.3 males, and for every 100 females age 18 and over there were 94.1 males age 18 and over.

100.0% of residents lived in urban areas, while 0.0% lived in rural areas.

There were 17,530 households in Campbell, of which 30.6% had children under the age of 18 living in them. Of all households, 47.6% were married-couple households, 19.2% were households with a male householder and no spouse or partner present, and 25.7% were households with a female householder and no spouse or partner present. About 26.9% of all households were made up of individuals and 9.9% had someone living alone who was 65 years of age or older.

There were 18,385 housing units, of which 4.7% were vacant. The homeowner vacancy rate was 0.5% and the rental vacancy rate was 4.3%.

Racial composition as of the 2020 census
Race	Number	Percent
White	22,440	51.0%
Black or African American	1,078	2.5%
American Indian and Alaska Native	335	0.8%
Asian	10,626	24.2%
Native Hawaiian and Other Pacific Islander	147	0.3%
Some other race	3,714	8.4%
Two or more races	5,619	12.8%
Hispanic or Latino (of any race)	8,424	19.2%

=== Recent estimates ===
According to Census Bureau QuickFacts estimates, there were 16,121 households, with an average of 2.64 persons per household. About 84.1% of residents lived in the same house one year earlier, and 35.6% of residents age 5 and over spoke a language other than English at home.

The owner-occupied housing unit rate was 49.2%. The median value of owner-occupied housing units was $1,156,000, and the median gross rent was $2,323.

=== 2010 census ===
The 2010 United States census reported that Campbell had a population of 39,349.

The racial makeup of Campbell was 26,315 (66.9%) White, 7,247 (18.4%) Hispanic or Latino of any race, 6,320 (16.1%) Asian, 1,158 (2.9%) African American, 275 (0.7%) Native American, and 161 (0.4%) Pacific Islander. A remaining 2,713 (6.9%) identified as other races, and 2,407 (6.1%) from two or more races.

The Census reported that 39,148 people (99.5% of the population) lived in households, 79 (0.2%) lived in non-institutionalized group quarters, and 122 (0.3%) were institutionalized.

There were 16,163 households, out of which 4,897 (30.3%) had children under the age of 18 living in them, 7,133 (44.1%) were opposite-sex married couples living together, 1,741 (10.8%) had a female householder with no husband present, 812 (5.0%) had a male householder with no wife present. There were 1,092 (6.8%) unmarried opposite-sex partnerships, and 138 (0.9%) same-sex married couples or partnerships. 4,805 households (29.7%) were made up of individuals, and 1,328 (8.2%) had someone living alone who was 65 years of age or older. The average household size was 2.42. There were 9,686 families (59.9% of all households); the average family size was 3.05.

The population was spread out, with 8,271 people (21.0%) under the age of 18, 2,982 people (7.6%) aged 18 to 24, 12,834 people (32.6%) aged 25 to 44, 10,868 people (27.6%) aged 45 to 64, and 4,394 people (11.2%) who were 65 years of age or older. The median age was 38.3 years. For every 100 females, there were 96.2 males. For every 100 females age 18 and over, there were 94.2 males.

There were 16,950 housing units at an average density of 2,879.7 units per square mile (1,111.9 units/km^{2}), of which 8,093 (50.1%) were owner-occupied, and 8,070 (49.9%) were occupied by renters. The homeowner vacancy rate was 1.8%; the rental vacancy rate was 4.6%. 20,975 people (53.3% of the population) lived in owner-occupied housing units and 18,173 people (46.2%) lived in rental housing units.

Demographic profile	2010
Total Population	39,349 - 100.0%
One Race	36,942 - 93.9%
Not Hispanic or Latino	32,102 - 81.6%
White alone	22,866 - 58.1%
Black or African American alone	1,109 - 2.8%
American Indian and Alaska Native alone	101 - 0.3%
Asian alone	6,222 - 15.8%
Native Hawaiian and Other Pacific Islander alone	140 - 0.4%
Some other race alone	85 - 0.2%
Two or more races alone	1,579 - 4.0%
Hispanic or Latino (of any race)	7,247 - 18.4%

=== 2000 census ===
As of the census of 2000, there were 39,200 people, 15,920 households, and 9,122 families residing in the city. The population density was 6,802.8 inhabitants per square mile (2,626.6/km^{2}). There were 16,286 housing units at an average density of 2,905.0 units per square mile (1,121.6 units/km^{2}). The racial makeup of the city was 72.78% White, 2.53% African American, 0.65% Native American, 14.16% Asian, 0.23% Pacific Islander, 4.87% from other races, and 4.77% from two or more races. Hispanic or Latino of any race were 13.33% of the population.

28.0% of the households had children under the age of 18 living with them, 42.6% were married couples living together, 10.1% had a female householder with no husband present, and 42.7% were non-families. 30.4% of all households were made up of individuals, and 7.0% had someone living alone who was 65 years of age or older. The average household size was 2.38 and the average family size was 3.02.

The city population was 21.6% under the age of 18, 7.6% from 18 to 24, 40.2% from 25 to 44, 20.9% from 45 to 64, and 9.7% who were 65 years of age or older. The median age was 35 years. For every 100 females, there were 98.6 males. For every 100 females age 18 and over, there were 96.7 males.

About 48% of the adult population has at least one college-level degree. However, this has declined in recent years as a greater number of working-class immigrants move into the city.

The median income for a household in the city was $67,214, and the median income for a family was $78,663 (these figures had risen to $70,928 and $89,285 respectively as of a 2007 estimate). Males had a median income of $52,454 versus $43,750 for females. The per capita income for the city was $34,441. About 3.2% of families and 4.8% of the population were below the poverty line, including 4.2% of those under age 18 and 8.3% of those age 65 or over.

== Climate ==
Campbell has a Mediterranean climate, characterized by mild, wet winters and warm, dry summers.

Climate data for Campbell, California
Month	Jan	Feb	Mar	Apr	May	Jun	Jul	Aug	Sep	Oct	Nov	Dec	Year
Record high °F (°C)	79 (26)	80 (27)	88 (31)	96 (36)	101 (38)	114 (46)	113 (45)	107 (42)	109 (43)	103 (39)	87 (31)	83 (28)	114 (46)
Mean daily maximum °F (°C)	59 (15)	62 (17)	66 (19)	70 (21)	76 (24)	81 (27)	85 (29)	84 (29)	82 (28)	75 (24)	64 (18)	57 (14)	72 (22)
Mean daily minimum °F (°C)	39 (4)	41 (5)	43 (6)	45 (7)	49 (9)	52 (11)	55 (13)	55 (13)	53 (12)	49 (9)	43 (6)	39 (4)	47 (8)
Record low °F (°C)	18 (−8)	21 (−6)	27 (−3)	30 (−1)	34 (1)	37 (3)	37 (3)	39 (4)	38 (3)	31 (−1)	28 (−2)	16 (−9)	16 (−9)
Average precipitation inches (mm)	4.94 (125)	5.06 (129)	3.63 (92)	1.40 (36)	.54 (14)	.10 (2.5)	0 (0)	.03 (0.76)	.18 (4.6)	1.01 (26)	2.37 (60)	4.01 (102)	23.27 (591.86)
Source: Weather Channel

== Economy ==
8x8, Barracuda Networks, List Biological Laboratories, Move, ChargePoint, Hightail and ZURB are among the companies based in Campbell.

=== Top employers ===
According to the city's 2021 Comprehensive Annual Financial Report, the top employers in the city are:

#	Employer	# of Employees
1	Chargepoint, Inc.	1,029
2	8x8, Inc.	742
3	Barracuda Networks Inc.	315
4	Home Depot	230
5	Family Matters In-Home Care	210
6	Whole Foods Market	208
7	Moss Adams LLP	201
8	SAAMA Technologies	185
9	Bioreference Laboratories Inc.	170
10	Groupware Technology Inc.	170

== Politics ==
At the county level, Campbell is located entirely within the 4th supervisorial district, represented on the Santa Clara County Board of Supervisors by Susan Ellenberg.

In the California State Legislature, Campbell is in the 13th senatorial district, represented by Democrat Josh Becker, and in the 23rd Assembly district, represented by Democrat Marc Berman.

In the United States House of Representatives, Campbell is in California's 16th congressional district, represented by Democrat Sam Liccardo.

The city is represented by the city council, which internally elects a mayor and vice-mayor every calendar year.

Campbell is strongly Democratic in presidential elections, with the last Republican to win the city being Ronald Reagan in 1984.

The city is policed by its own police force, the Campbell Police Department, which shares its building with the rest of city hall. It sponsors a Law Enforcement Exploring program.

== Layout ==
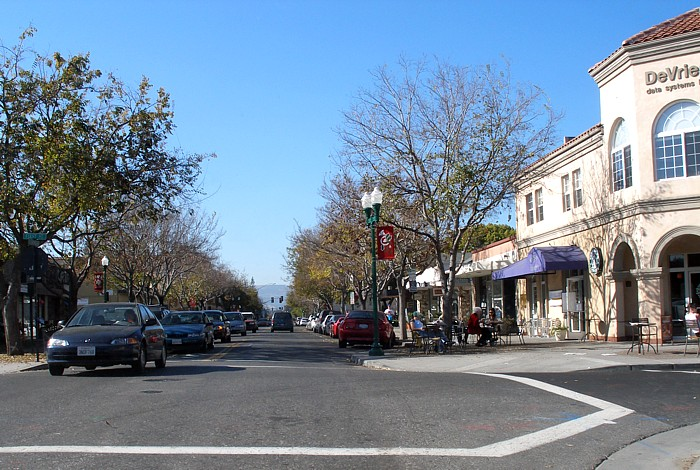
Downtown Campbell

Campbell is in the southwest portion of Santa Clara Valley. It is bisected by Highway 17 passing through eastern Campbell. Highway 85 is to its south. The historic downtown section sits just west of the railroad in the central area. The southwestern area of Campbell is known as the San Tomas neighborhood and varies somewhat from most of Campbell in the size of its lots and styles of housing. East–west running Hamilton Avenue is one of the northernmost roads in Campbell.

The largest park in Campbell is Los Gatos County Park near Highway 17, and the second largest is John D. Morgan Park.

== Transportation ==
- State Route 17
- State Route 85
- Interstate 280

Campbell is served by several major roads, including State Route 17, State Route 85, Interstate 280, and San Tomas Expressway (Santa Clara County Route G4). Major local arterial roads include Winchester Boulevard and Bascom Avenue.

Public transport in Campbell is operated by the Santa Clara Valley Transportation Authority and includes several local and express bus lines that link the community to nearby towns, including Cupertino, Los Gatos, Palo Alto, San Jose, Santa Clara and Saratoga. Additionally, the town is served by three light rail stations on the Mountain View - Winchester line, including Hamilton Station, Downtown Campbell Station, and the line's terminus at Winchester Station. These stations were opened as part of the first phase of the Vasona Light Rail project; the line will be extended past Winchester to Vasona Junction in Los Gatos once funding is secured. That line is now served by buses.

The extension was the subject of a minor dispute with the Federal Railroad Administration over the sounding of train horns late at night. This dispute delayed the opening of most of the extension for two months before the grand opening on October 1, 2005.

== Housing and businesses ==
There are few large shopping centers or business complexes in the city, as Campbell is primarily a suburban residential area.

Most residences are single-family homes, although there are some areas with condominiums, duplexes, and apartments. Single-family homes typically have one or two bathrooms and three or four bedrooms and are between 1,000 and 1,600 square feet (93 and 149 m^{2}) on lots typically measuring about 6,000 square feet (560 m^{2}). The vast majority were built in the 1950s through 1970s. There are pockets of older homes, mostly near downtown, often in demand for their architectural styles. There are also pockets of newer, much larger homes about 3,500 square feet (330 m^{2}), mostly built in the 1990s on subdivided lots previously occupied by homes dating from the first half of the 20th century.

Campbell's downtown is located near where Campbell Avenue intersects with the railroad. The downtown has many shops, bars, and restaurants.

The oldest commercial building in the city was erected in 1920 for the Grower's Bank. The building was converted to a movie theater in 1938. In 1968, The Gaslighter Theater company purchased and refurbished the building with a small stage and bar. The Gaslighter produced melodramas and Vaudeville-style shows there until it closed in 2006. In 2013 the building was sold and underwent refurbishment to become a wine bar, tasting room, and restaurant.

As of October 2006, the median price of single-family homes and condos was $707,500, up 4.8% from the previous October, and averaging $472 per square foot ($5,080/m^{2}) according to the San Jose Mercury News; the average single-family home price, excluding condos, was $645,000 in January 2004 (according to the Santa Clara County Association of Realtors). The price is based largely on the land value; the replacement cost for homes is about $150 to $200 per square foot ($1,600 to $2,200/m^{2}).

With the advent of the California housing crisis, property values have greatly increased; as of February 2026, the average home value was $1,937,114, according to Zillow.

Like many other cities in the Santa Clara Valley, Campbell was originally orchard land that was later developed into housing tracts.

== Education ==
Campbell public schools belong to two districts, the Campbell Union School District and the Campbell Union High School District. Of these districts, the schools located within the city are Campbell School of Innovation (K-8), Capri Elementary, Rosemary Elementary, Village School, and Westmont High School. Forest Hill Elementary School's campus is partially located in Campbell as well. Westmont High School is home to one of the few enduring Future Farmers of America programs left in the San Francisco Bay Area.

Within the school districts, there are 19 Campbell elementary schools, 9 Campbell middle schools, 3 Campbell high schools and 28 Campbell preschool schools. There are also 13 private schools in Campbell.

Santa Clara County Library operates the Campbell Library, which is currently relocated to the Campbell Community Center while it's being renovated. The renovated library is set to open May 9, 2026.

== Points of interest ==
=== Landmarks ===
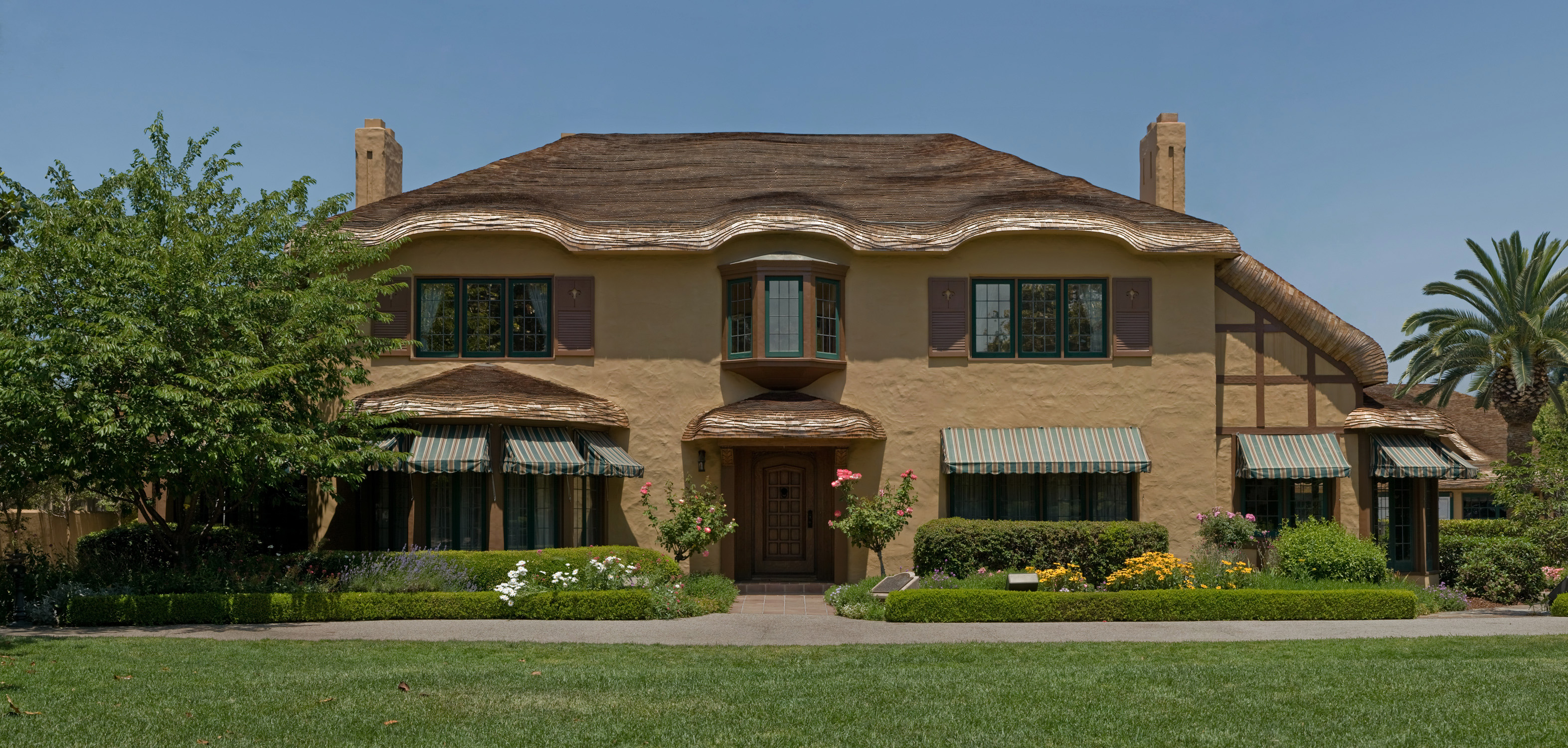
Ainsley House

In the early 1990s, the Ainsley House a unique English Tudor-style house built in 1925, was moved from its original site at the corner of Hamilton and Bascom Avenues (the current site of eBay's headquarters) to the downtown quad and furnished with many of the Ainsley family's original furnishings. It has become the centerpiece for the Ainsley House and Campbell Historical Museum, which houses additional exhibits in the nearby old firehouse. The Ainsley House was built in the style of English country cottages for John Colpitts Ainsley, a canning pioneer in Santa Clara County, which was at the time known for its vast spreads of fruit orchards.

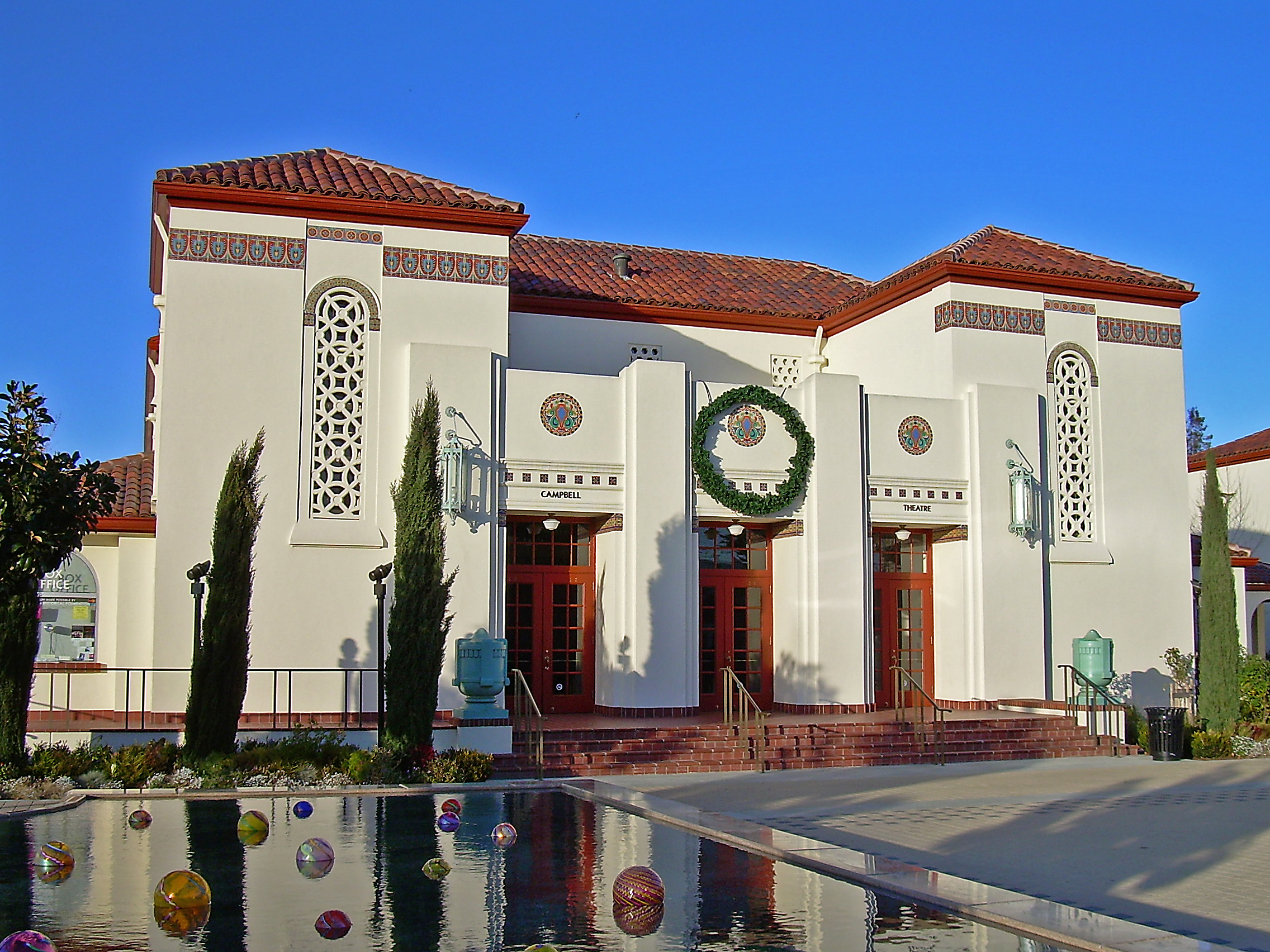
The Heritage Theater, formerly the Campbell High School auditorium

The Campbell Community Center is located on the northwest corner of Winchester and Campbell Avenues, in the building that used to be Campbell High School, the original school in the Campbell Union High School District. The Redwood Tree, which stands at the corner of Winchester Boulevard and Campbell Avenue was originally planted there on May 11, 1903, by then President Teddy Roosevelt. The city acquired the property on August 1, 1985, five years after the school shut down. The Heritage Theater, formerly the high school's auditorium, was reopened after renovations in 2004 as an entertainment and event venue. The Community Center holds classes, and portions are available to be rented for various events.

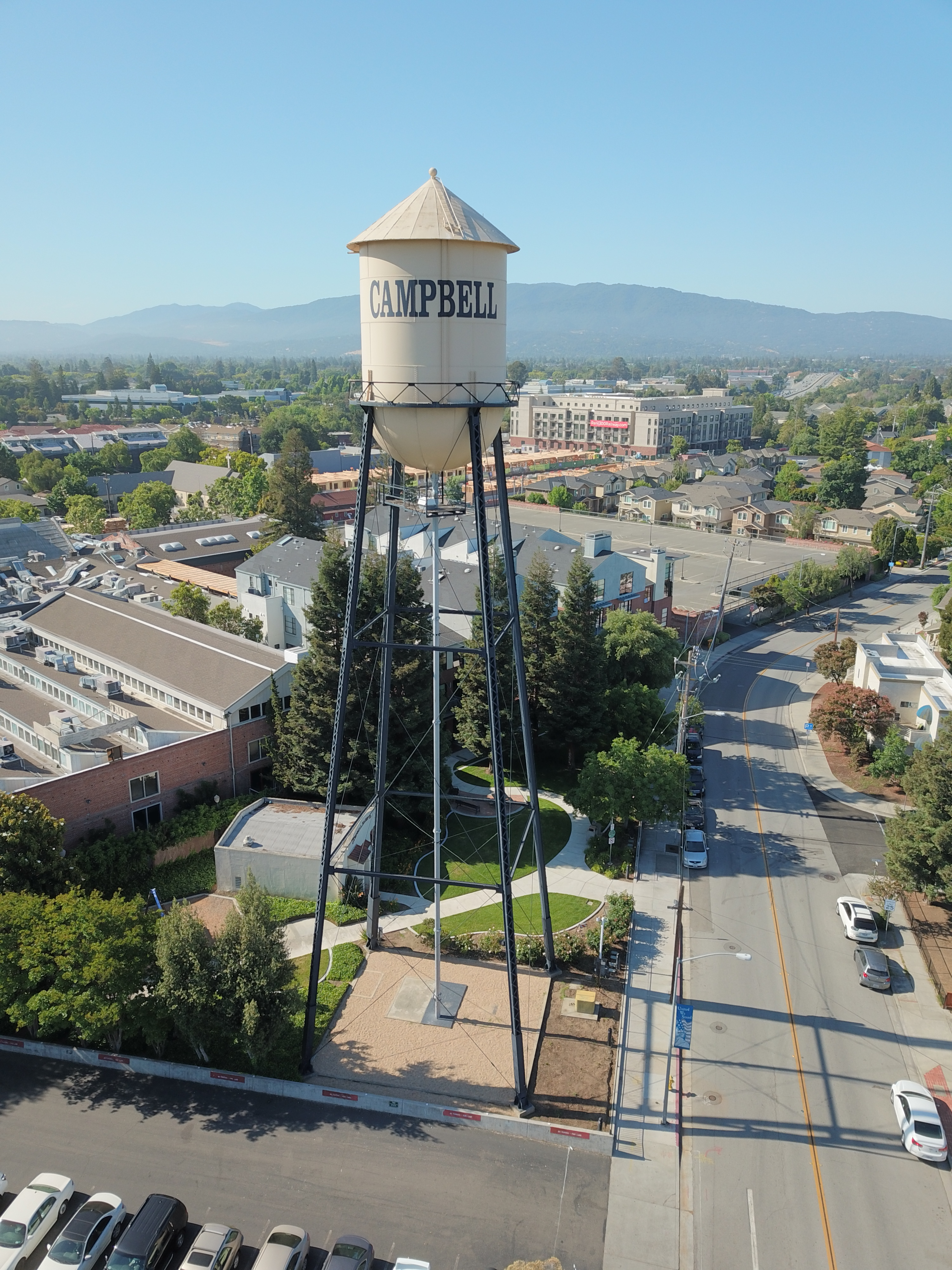
Campbell Water Tower

The Campbell Water Tower is a highly visible remnant of Campbell's "small town" past and located on the site of the original city water company and pumping plant near downtown. The tower, originally constructued in 1928, could hold up to 75,000 gallons of water. In 2016 the city installed a multi-colored lighting system so it can be illuminated for special occasions and holidays.

Campbell used to be the home of the Winchester Drive-In Theater (now a business park) and is also home to a number of public parks that include John D. Morgan Park, Campbell Park, Edith Morley Park (the site of the city's community garden program), Jack Fischer Park, the Los Gatos Creek Trail Park, Orchard City Green, and Stojanovich Family Park. Joseph Gomes Park located at 217 Winchester Blvd. is the smallest park in Campbell.

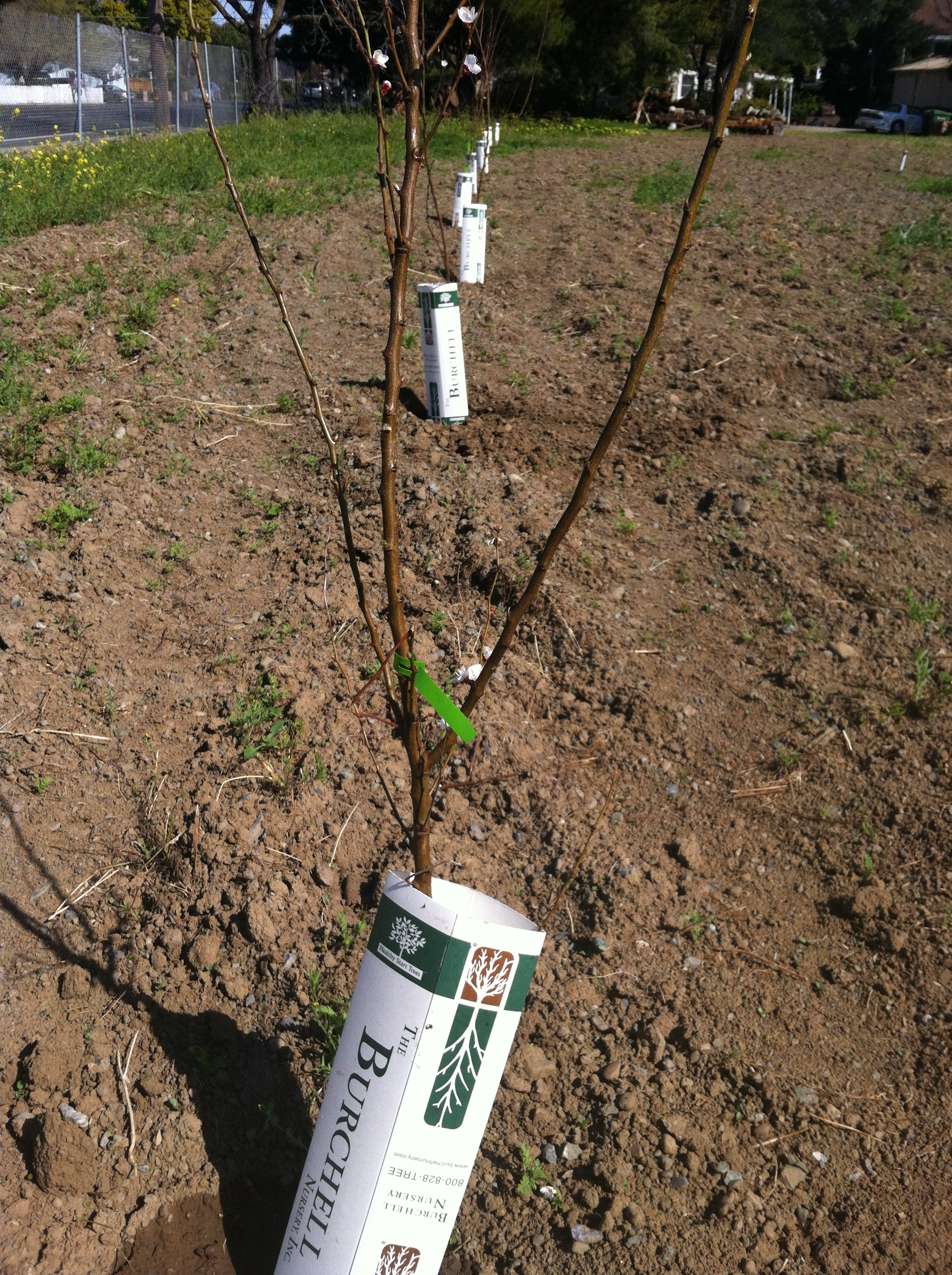
Blenheim apricot trees planted in 2013 on the Dubcich farm

The Dubcich farm located on West Campbell Ave. near John D. Morgan Park is Campbell's last remaining piece of agricultural property and connection to the city's agrarian origins. It is still intact with its original farm house dating back to the 1920s, barn, and fruit trees.

=== Athletics ===
Campbell for many years had one of the most successful youth baseball programs in the country, reaching fourteen World Series from 1960 to 1987.

Campbell's youth baseball system dates to 1909, when Campbell High School formed its first team and won the Interurban Athletic Union championship. The community's first non-scholastic youth baseball organization was the Junior Hardball League, which began in 1947. In 1954, Campbell Little League and Campbell Pony League began operation, and Moreland Little League, which is located in west San Jose but historically has served many Campbell residents, started in 1959.

Moreland in 1962 became the only Northern California team to win a Little League World Series, with 6-foot-1, 210-pound (95 kg) Ted Campbell pitching a no-hitter in a 3–0 victory over Kankakee, Illinois, in the championship game. Campbell Little League reached the Little League World Series championship game in 1970, 1976, and 1979, becoming one of only two American leagues to go to the LLWS three times in one decade. In all, Campbell-system teams have won six youth baseball World Series and finished second five times. Ten future major leaguers played in the Campbell youth baseball system: Chris Codiroli, Don Hahn, George Tsamis, Steve Davis, Dan Gladden, Doug Capilla, Rich Troedson, Joe Ferguson, John Oldham, and Greg Gohr.

== Notable people ==
The following is a list of notable individuals who were born, raised, and/or residents in the City of Campbell.

- Alan Aerts, world powerlifting champion
- Paul Bravo, soccer player
- Dave Meltzer, wrestling journalist, historian and author
- Sylvia Browne, psychic, spiritualist
- Brett Dalton, actor
- Lars Frederiksen, musician
- Dan Gladden, baseball player and broadcaster
- Claire Lobrovich, baseball player
- Evan Low, state assemblyman, former mayor
- Annika Penickova (born 2009), American tennis player
- Kristina Penickova (born 2009), American tennis player
