= Los Gatos Creek =

Los Gatos Creek may refer to:

- Los Gatos Creek (Fresno County, California)
- Los Gatos Creek (Santa Clara County, California)
  - Los Gatos Creek Park
  - Los Gatos Creek Trail
