= Los Gatos Historic Commercial District =

Historic district in California, United States

- U.S. National Register of Historic Places
- U.S. Historic district
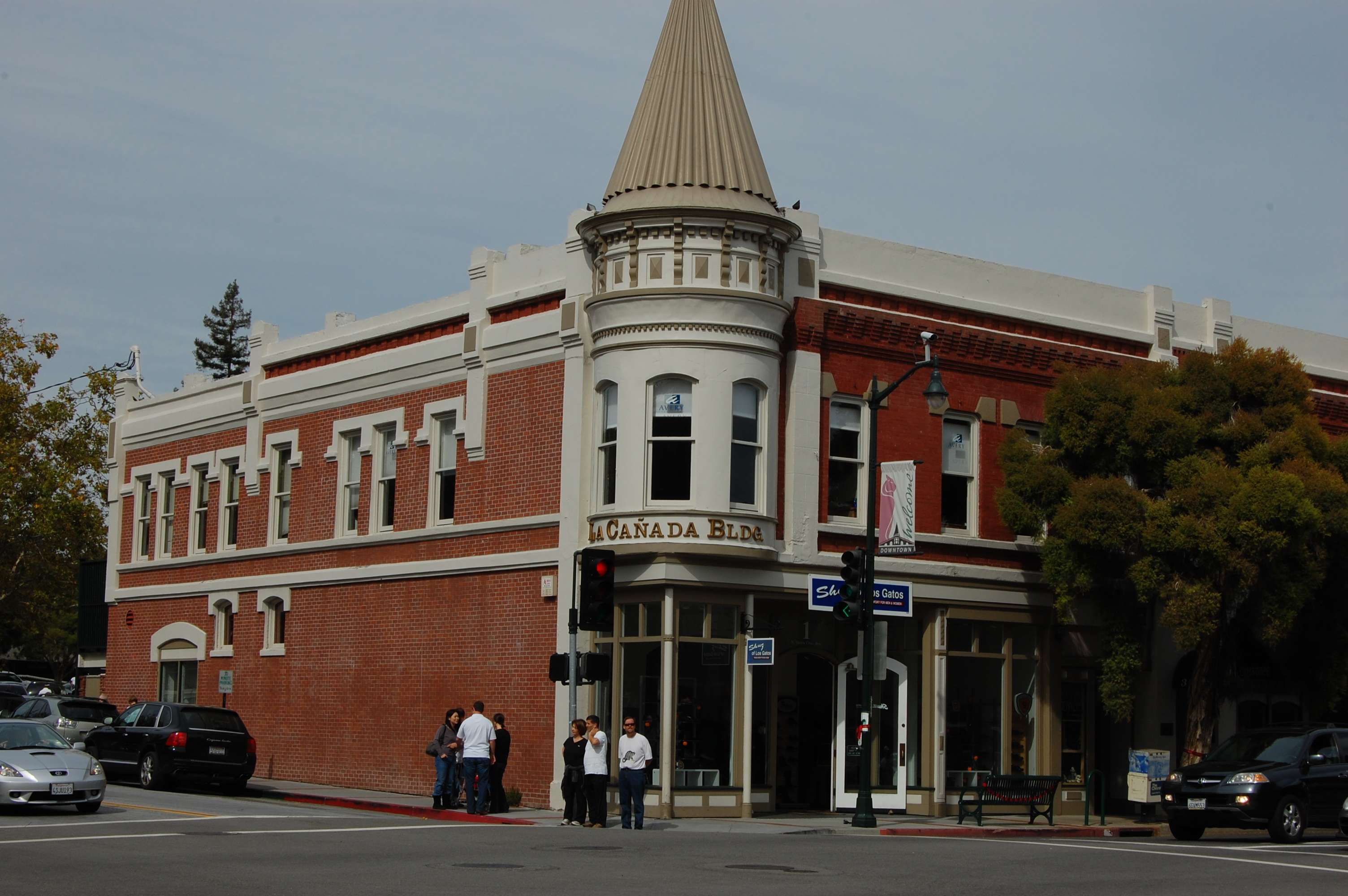
- La Cañada Building in Los Gatos Historic Commercial District

- Location within San Jose, California
- Location: Los Gatos, California
- Coordinates: 37°13′19″N 121°58′58″W
- Built: 1863; 163 years ago
- Architectural style: Art Deco; Mission Revival; Queen Anne style; Romanesque Revival
- Website: Official website
- NRHP reference No.: 91001382
- Added to NRHP: September 13, 1991

The Los Gatos Historic Commercial District of Los Gatos, Santa Clara County, California is a designated U.S. Historic District area of the city. The commercial district comprises a collection of commercial buildings that is bounded by both sides of West Main Street, North Santa Cruz Avenue, and University Avenue. These streets form an F-plan layout extending westward from the Main Street bridge situated in the southwestern region of the town of Los Gatos. The district covers the town's original commercial intersection and includes a substantial segment of its 19th-century commercial center. Within this area lies the sole surviving cluster of historic commercial buildings, reasonably well-preserved. The architectural styles within the district span from the Queen Anne style architecture and Richardsonian Romanesque, representing a broad spectrum of design trends, including Art Deco. The Los Gatos Historic Commercial District was placed on the National Register of Historic Places on September 13, 1991. Today, the historic commercial district remains a commercial hub and plays a role in local tourism.

== History ==
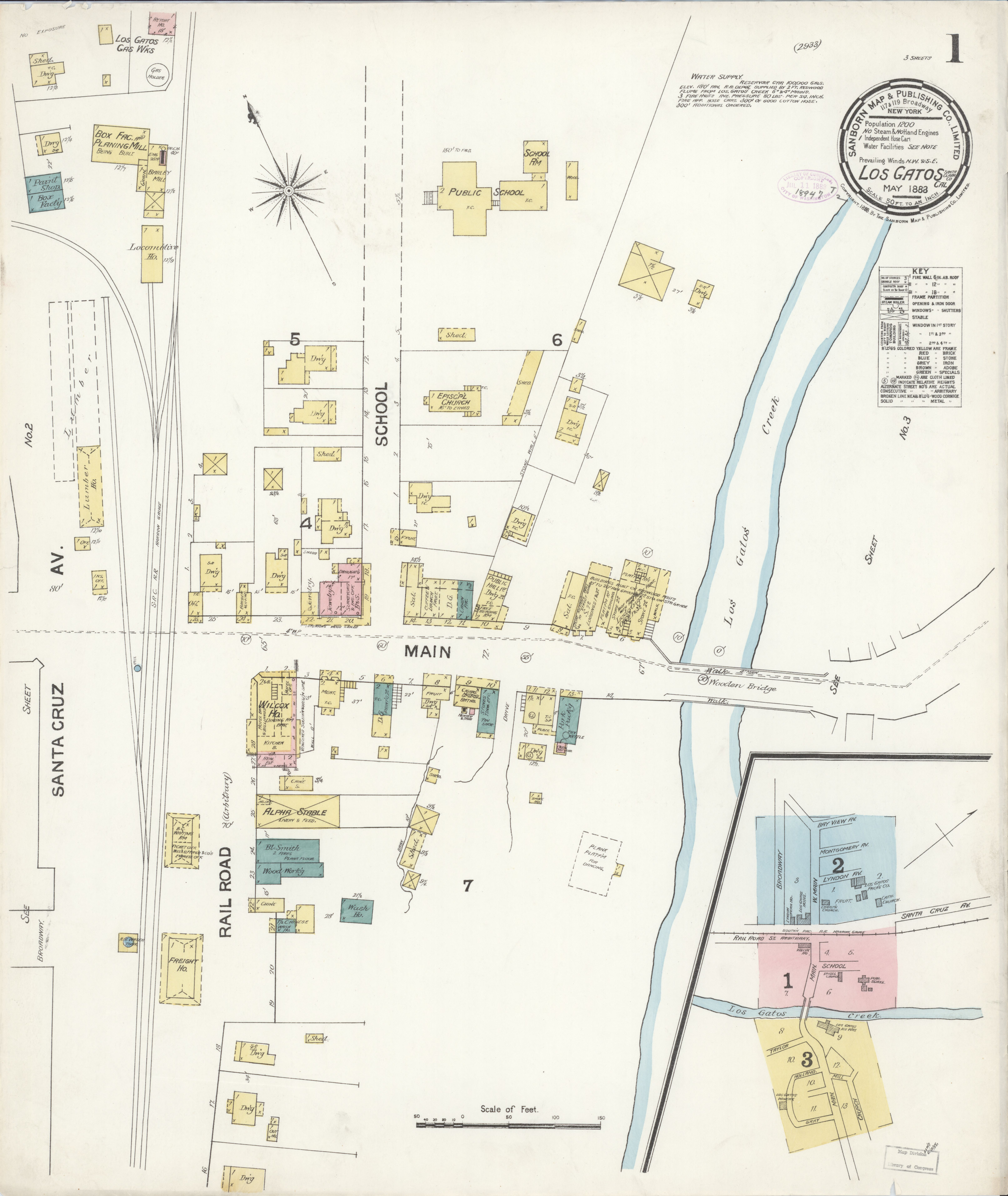
1888 Sanborn Fire Insurance Map from Los Gatos, Santa Clara County, California.

The origin of the Los Gatos Historic Commercial District can be traced back to 1863 when W. S. McMurtry and J. W. McMillan inaugurated a general store on Main Street, situated to the east of Los Gatos Green near the mill. In 1864, an official post office was established, marking a pivotal development. Subsequently, other businesses followed suit. By 1875, the Paulson directory recorded the presence of two general stores, two blacksmiths, and two saloons, presumably all located on Main Street to the east of the Los Gatos Creek. In addition, there was a hotel situated on the west side of the creek. The economic progress of Los Gatos experienced a significant boost when the railroad arrived in 1877. Within a span of three years, the population tripled, reaching 1,510 residents. According to the 1888 Sanborn maps, the area that would later become the historic district featured a range of businesses, including hardware stores, millinery shops, drugstores, lodgings, general stores, lodge halls, barbershops, notaries, jewelers, surveyors, and insurance offices. Moreover, there were two saloons, cigar and notions shops, produce stores, printing facilities, butcher shops, and a hotel. Main Street was indeed the primary commercial thoroughfare, with nearly all of the town's commercial activity concentrated there or just a few steps away on selected side streets.

A massive fire on July 27, 1891, wreaked havoc, consuming approximately two blocks of Main Street to the east of the then-wooded bridge. In the wake of this devastating event, the Town Board acted by authorizing the establishment of a second volunteer fire company. Additionally, they enacted an ordinance designating specific fire limits and requiring that structures within these limits be constructed using brick or stone materials, in a proactive effort to prevent future such calamities. In 1901, a devastating fire swept through the area, leveling a significant portion of the business commercial on both sides of West Main Street, resulting in the destruction of 60 buildings. In the aftermath of the fire, the town's business district shifted its focus northward onto Santa Cruz Avenue.

Within this commercial district, you can find numerous architectural styles. For instance, the Sorenson Plumbing building at 21-23 West Main Street, a one-story wood frame structure erected in 1906, stands as a fine example of the Mission Revival style. In 1941, the property was purchased by Sorenson. Meanwhile, the Fretwell Building, located at the intersection of West Main Street and University Avenue, is a prime example of Romanesque Revival architecture, with intricate detailing on its stone-faced reinforced concrete facade. This building, completed in 1907, also serves as an illustration of early, robust reinforced concrete construction and was once home to the First National Bank of Los Gatos from 1912 to 1918.

=== Rankin Block ===
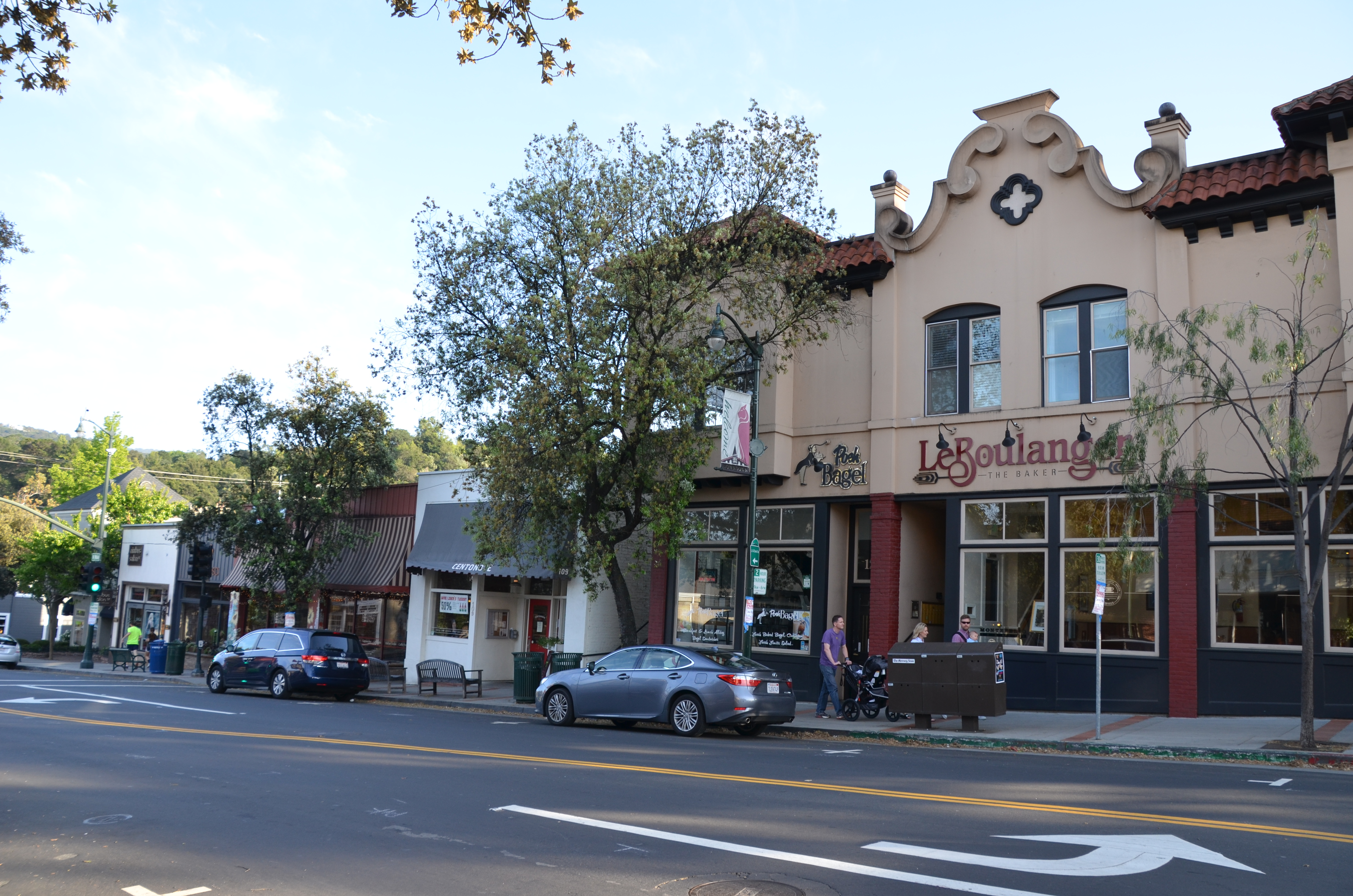
Montebello Building at 123-149 West Main Street

In 1902, William B. Rankin and his wife, Clara, oversaw the construction of a two-story Mission Revival-style building on a site located at Main and Front Street (now known as Montebello Way). The stucco-faced Rankin Block, also known as the Montebello Building, situated at 123-149 West Main Street, serves as another example of Mission Revival architecture within the district. This building remains standing to this day and served as the post office from 1917 to 1948. Additionally, from 1932 until the 1989 Loma Prieta earthquake, the Chamber of Commerce had a presence in a portion of the building. Although some alterations have been made, such as the removal of two curvilinear parapets and modifications to the storefronts and applied relief ornamentation on the upper floor, the building remains a visual anchor for the district. It still retains many of its historical elements, including the distinctive tile hip-roofed towers, exterior stucco finish, windows, ornamental window mullions, corner entrance, brick pilasters, vertical divisions, entrance, and upstairs hallways. The Montebello building's construction dates back to 1902, following a fire on October 13, 1901.

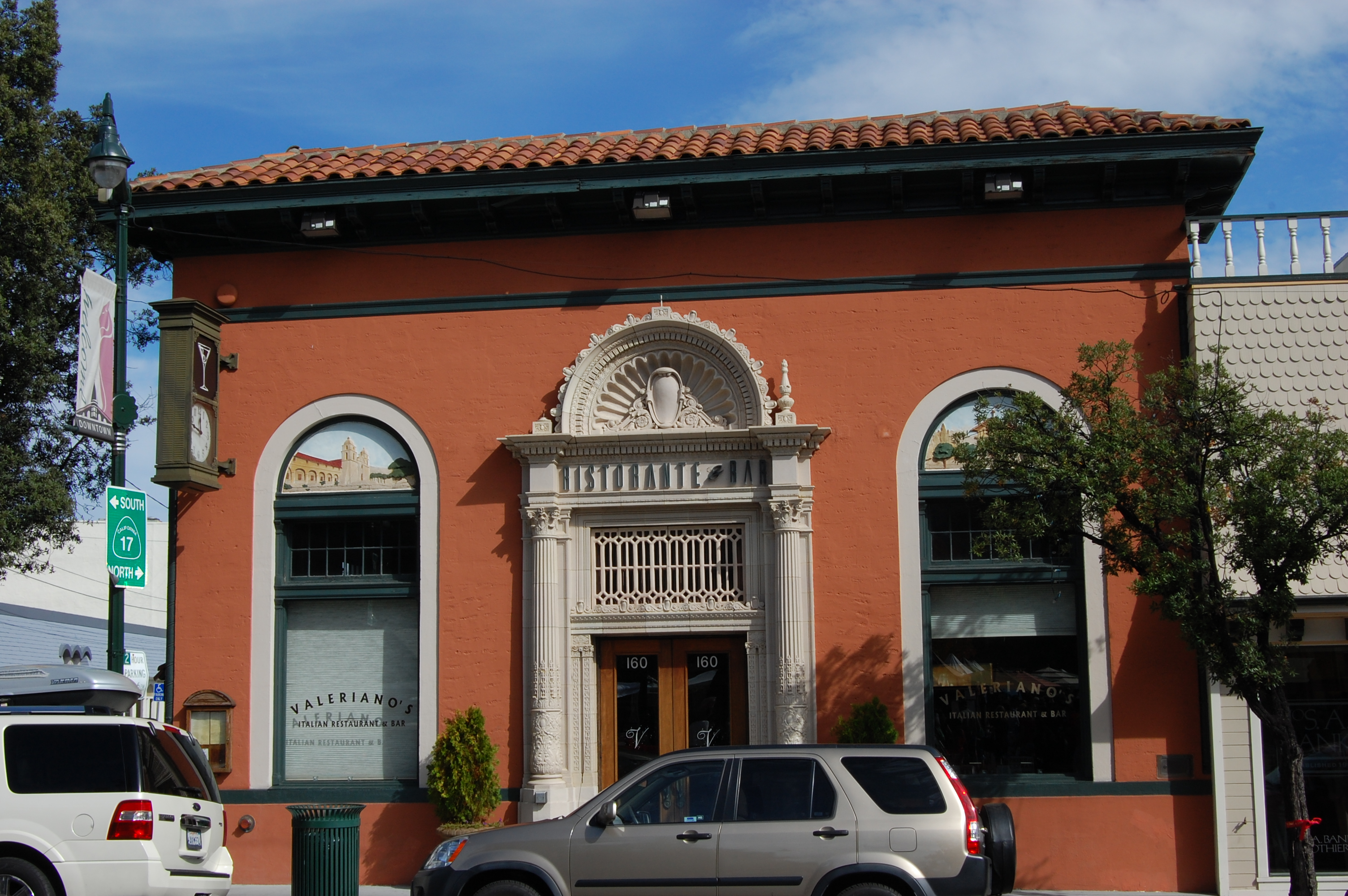
First National Bank on 160 West Main Street

The First National Bank Building is located at the northeast corner of 160 West Main and Santa Cruz Avenue. This structure exemplifies Renaissance Revival architecture, a tall one-story design that was constructed in 1920. The First National Bank of Los Gatos occupied this building until 1955. The lunettes above four windows feature bas-relief sculptures of Franciscan Missions, adding to its historical and artistic significance.

=== Hofstra Block ===
Among the buildings at this intersection is the Hofstra Block, also known as the La Cañada Building at 1-17 North Santa Cruz Avenue. This area is defined by three brick party wall buildings, with the first one positioned at the intersection of West Main and Santa Cruz Avenue, featuring a circular bay window topped by a witch-hat roof projection. The northernmost section and the ground floor of the central portion were constructed in 1891, with the southern portion added in 1895, and the second story added to the central portion in 1905.

=== Bogart Block ===
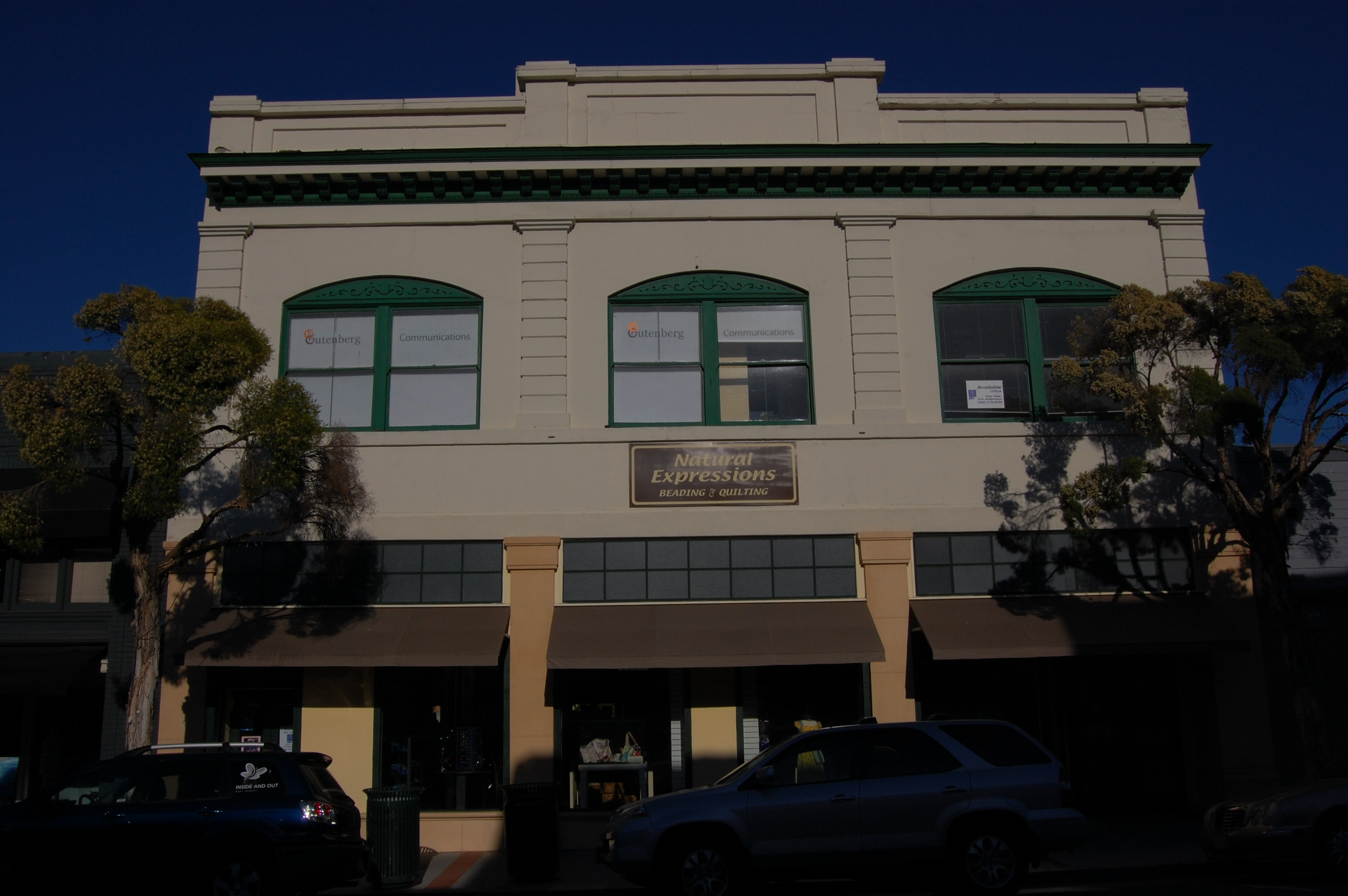
Woodmen's Hall 18-20 Santa Cruz Avenue

Frank A. Bogart was associated with a 60 ft (18 m) establishment on one of the main streets in Los Gatos. The Bogart Block, also known as Woodmen's Hall, located at 18-20 Santa Cruz Avenue, was built in 1907. This two-story building is constructed of reinforced concrete and features Classical Revival ornamentation. Architectural elements include rusticated pilasters, a modillion cornice, a paneled parapet, and arched second-story windows. Historically, the upstairs of the Bogart Block served as the meeting place for the Woodmen of the World. During the Loma Prieta earthquake, the second story became separated from the first floor. However, it was subsequently reconnected and reinforced without altering its historic appearance, preserving the building's architectural integrity.

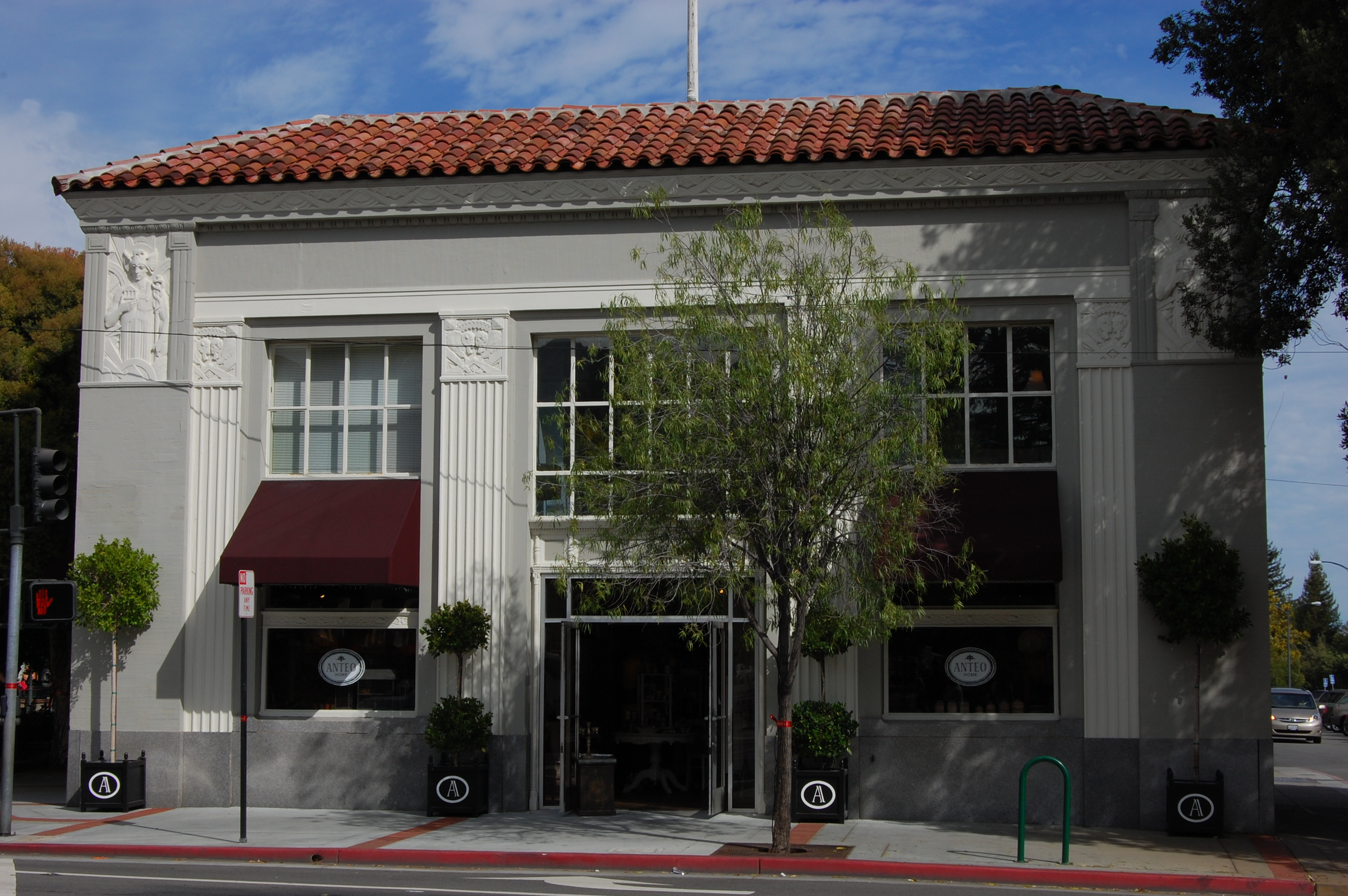
Bank of America Building at 198 West Main Street

The Art Deco architectural movement is well-represented by the Bank of America Building at 198 West Main Street. This two-story reinforced concrete building, with a stucco facade, was constructed between 1931 and 1932. It served as the location for Bank of America until 1963. It was one of the earliest new buildings constructed for the bank after its name changed from Bank of Italy to Bank of America. The building features a framed window wall composition and an exquisite zigzag frieze beneath a ceramic tile roof, showcasing elements of the Art Deco style. At 24 North Santa Cruz Avenue, you'll find the Templeman Hardware Store, a one-and-a-half-story reinforced concrete building designed in the Mission Revival style. It is characterized by a combed brick parapet, molded accent blocks, and green marble splash panels. Arthur W. Templeman operated his hardware store in this building from its construction around 1921 until 1966.

The Charles Wagner River Rock Bungalow, located at 15 University Avenue, stands as the sole residential structure within the district. Constructed in the 1920s, this one-story bungalow is distinguished by its exterior, which is entirely composed of rounded rocks sourced from Los Gatos Creek. Charles Wagner, the original owner, operated a barbershop on West Main Street, while Mrs. Alice Wagner ran her professional photography business from this residence. In the 1930s, Jacques Libante lived in the house. In 1934, Libante had the Gem City French Laundry constructed at the rear of the property, which is located at 11 University Avenue. This laundry is one of Los Gatos' finest examples of Art Deco architecture and served as a French hand laundry until the 1960s.

== Historical significance ==
The Los Gatos Historic Commercial District holds historical significance as determined by the National Register of Historic Places. It satisfies Criterion A due to its association with the economic development of the community, reflecting significant events and patterns in the town's history. Additionally, it aligns with Criterion C, which pertains to its architectural value, as it represents the town's sole concentration of reasonably intact commercial buildings that are over 50 years old. The district's period of significance is from 1891 to 1941. The Los Gatos Historic Commercial District was placed on the National Register of Historic Places on September 13, 1991.

== Significant buildings ==
1. La Cañada Building
2. Old Fellos Hall
3. Theresa Block
4. Woodmen's Hall
5. Salvation Army Hall
6. Crall Stationery Store
7. Templeman Hardware Store
8. Chamber of Commerce Office
9. Libante's Gem City French Laundry
10. Charles Wagner River Rock Bungalow
11. Foothill Hotel
12. Sorenson Plumbing
13. Martin's Sunflower Candy Kitchen
14. Berryman Building
15. Fretwell Building
16. Rankin Block (Montebello Building)
17. First National Bank Building
18. Bank of America Building

== Gallery ==
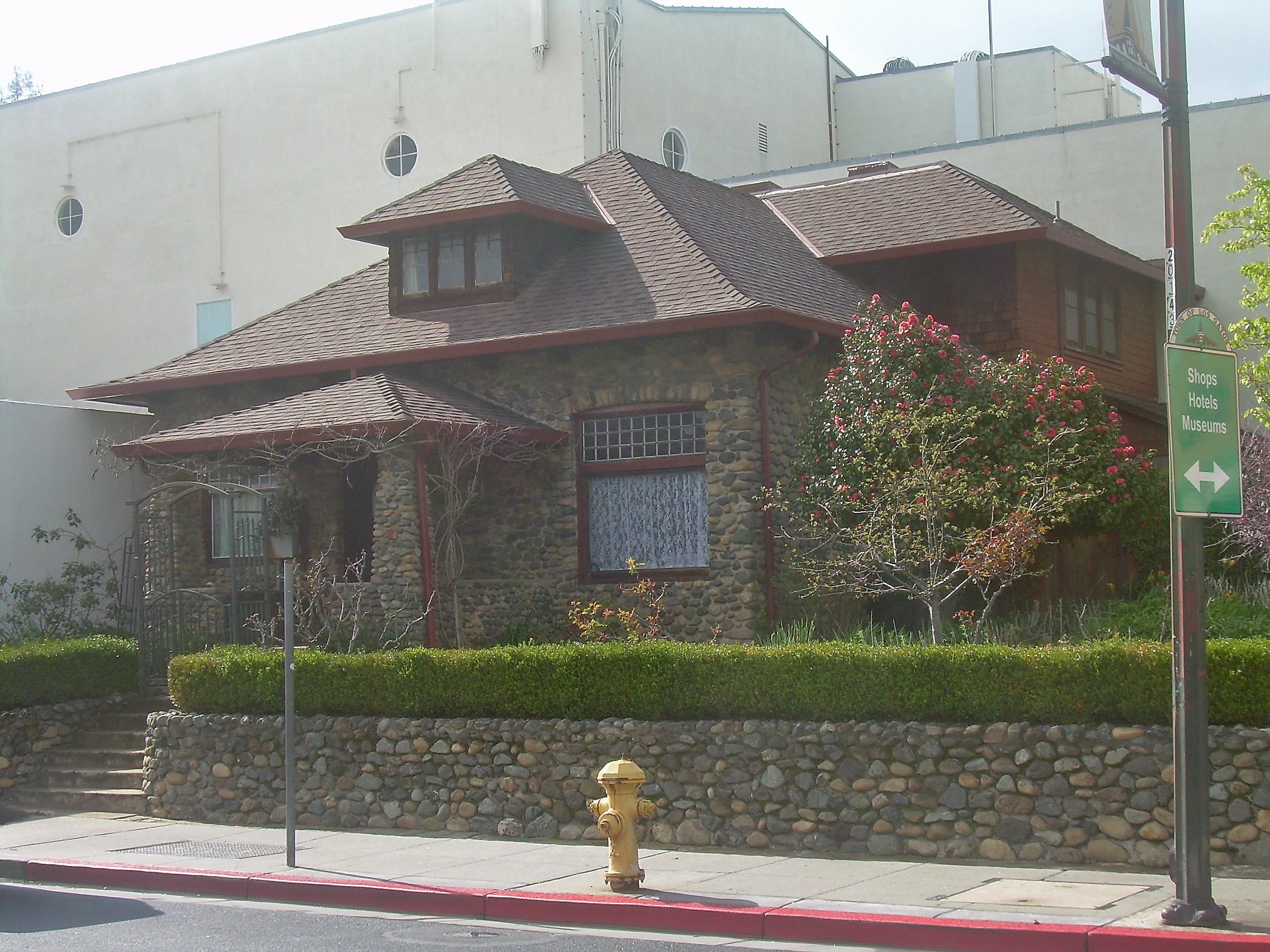
Charles Wagner River Rock Bungalow at 15 University Avenue

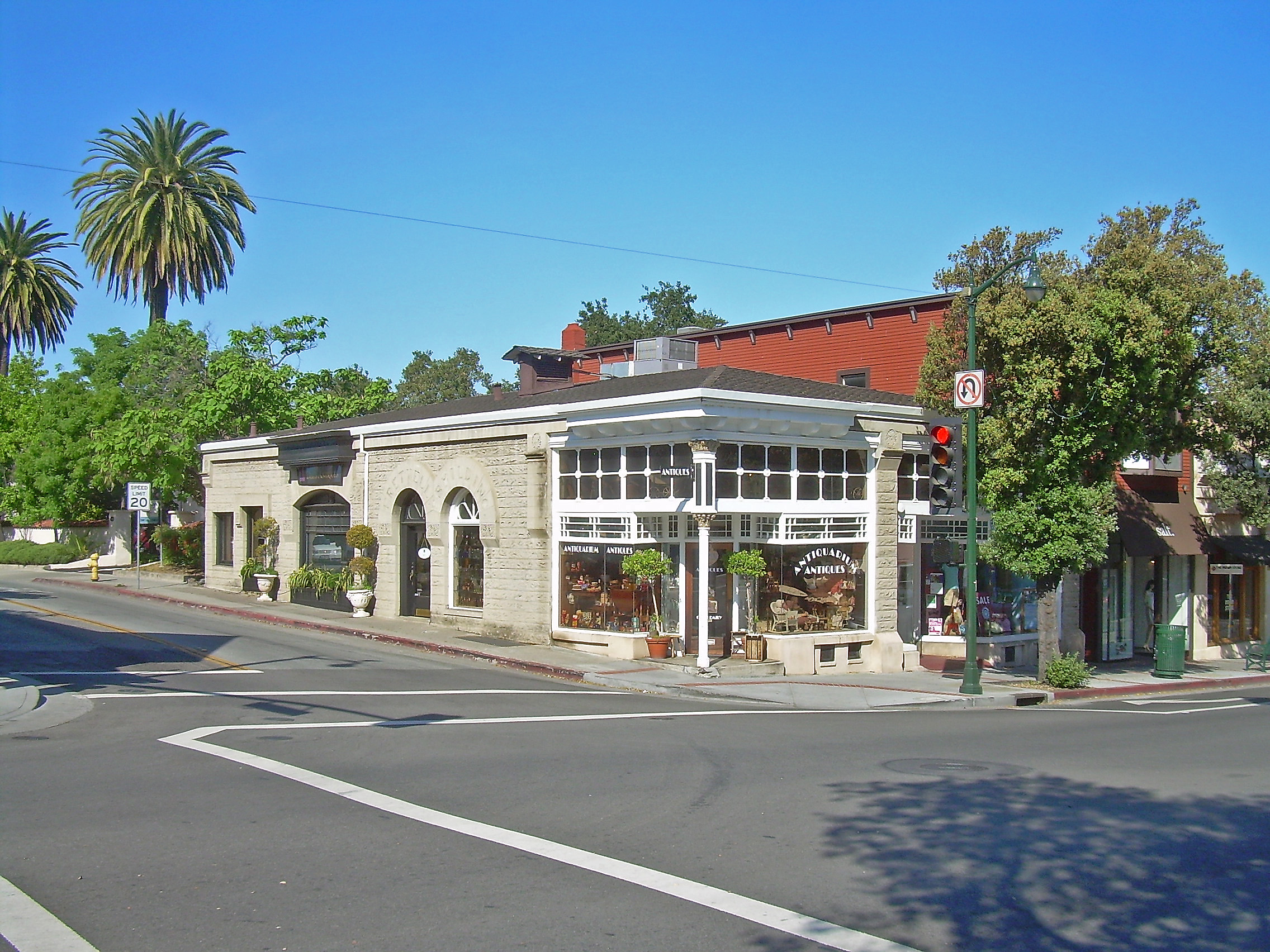
Fretwell Building, at intersection of West Main Street and University Avenue

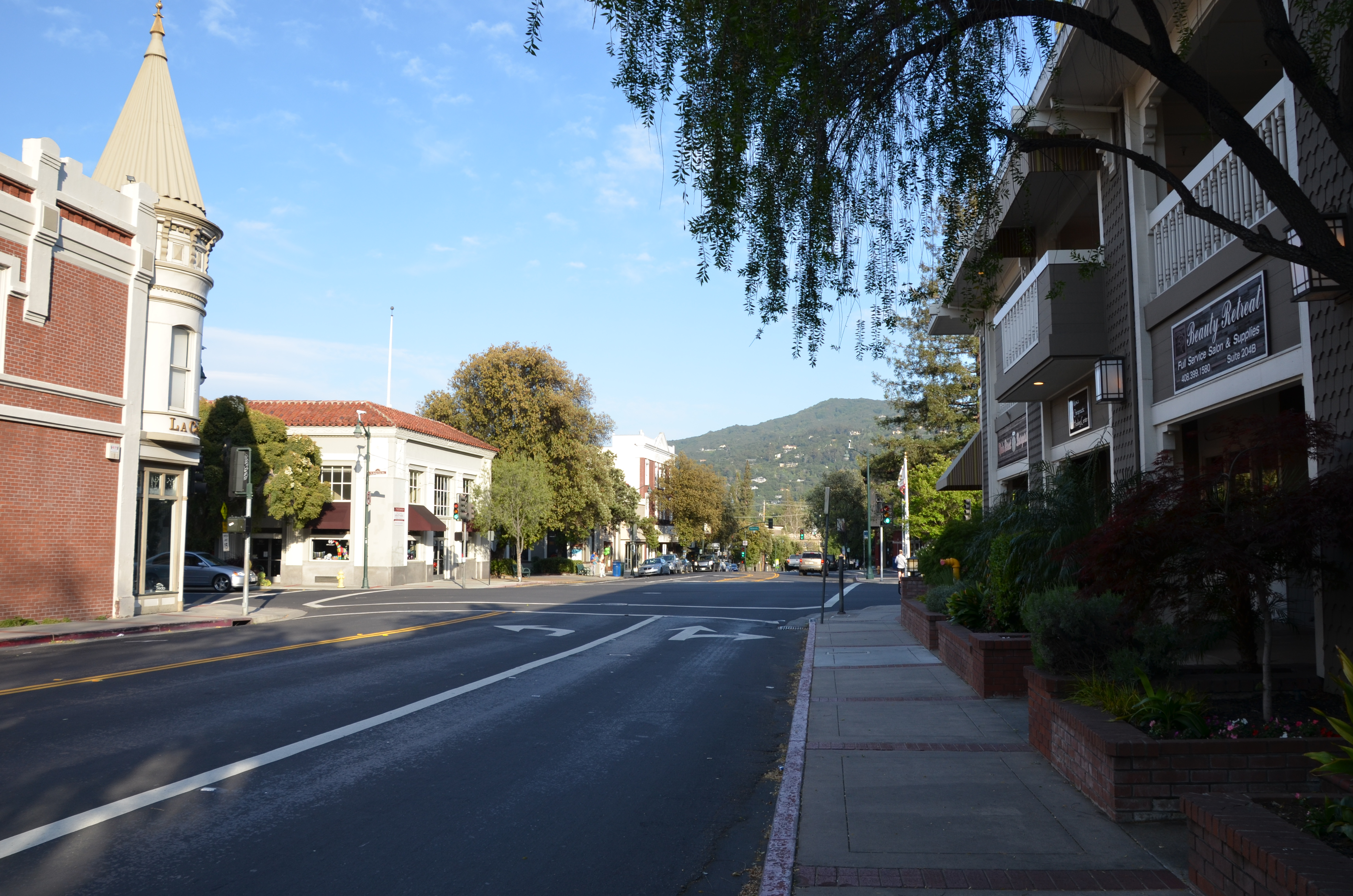
View of West Main Street and Santa Cruz Ave Los Gatos

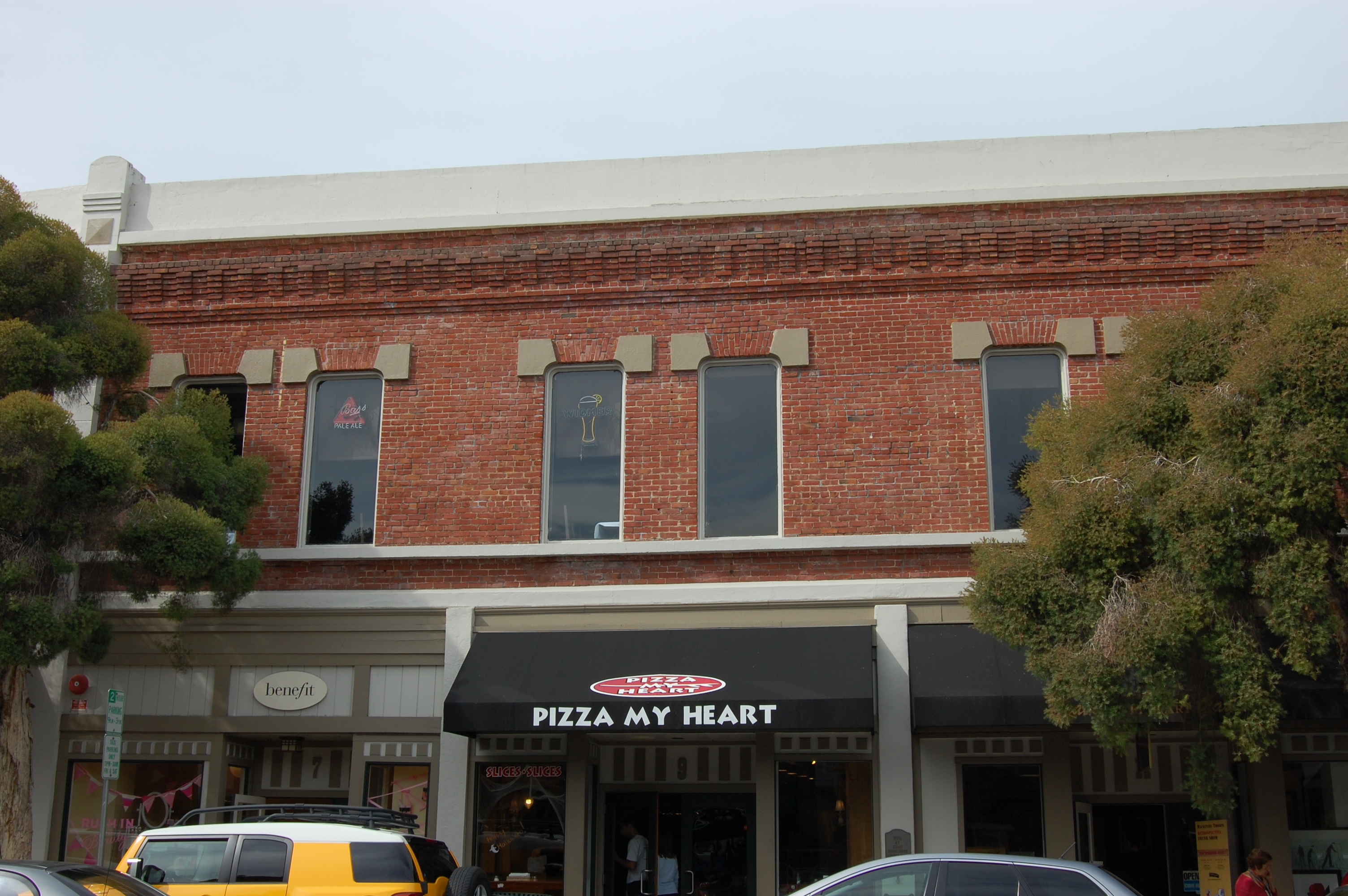
La Cañada Building 1-17 North Santa Cruz Avenue

=== See also ===
- National Register of Historic Places listings in Santa Clara County, California
- Los Gatos Creek Trail
