= Rancho Rinconada de Los Gatos =

Mexican land grant in California

Coordinates: 37.240°N 121.980°W

El Rancho Rinconada de los Gatos was a 6,631-acre (26.83 km^{2}) Mexican land grant in present-day Santa Clara County, California made in 1840 by Governor Juan Alvarado to Jose Maria Hernandez and Sebastian Fabian Peralta. Located in the southern San Francisco Bay Area, the grant included present-day Los Gatos and Monte Sereno, along with about a third of Campbell. It also included small sections of present-day San Jose, Saratoga and unincorporated Santa Clara County. Los Gatos Creek flowed through the center of the rancho. The name means "corner of the cats" and is derived from the cougars that are still present in the nearby hills, as well as the "corner" formed by the narrowing gap between El Sereno and El Sombroso mountains.

== History ==
Sebastian Peralta and José Hernandez, brothers-in-law married to two Sibrian sisters, were granted the one and one half square league Rancho Rinconada de Los Gatos in 1840. Sebastian Fabian Peralta (1794–?) married María Gregoria Sibrian (1806–1837) in 1831. After she died, he married María Paula Sepulveda, widow of Francisco Pérez Pacheco, in 1846. He was regidor of San José. José Maria Hernandez (1802–?) married Maria Gertrudis Sibrian (1810–1851) in 1830. After she died, he married Maria Espectacion Pena. They built an adobe home where Vasona Park is now.

With the cession of California to the United States following the Mexican–American War, the 1848 Treaty of Guadalupe Hidalgo provided that the land grants would be honored. As required by the Land Act of 1851, a claim for Rancho Rinconada de Los Gatos was filed with the Public Land Commission in 1852, and the grant was patented to Sebastian Peralta and José Hernandez in 1860.

Approximately 2,000 acres (8.1 km^{2}) were sold to James Alexander Forbes (1805–1881) in 1853, whereupon he built Forbes Mill. The mill began operating in 1855, but Forbes went bankrupt in 1857.

Three cities have been incorporated containing large sections of land from the grant: Los Gatos in 1887, Campbell in 1952, and Monte Sereno in 1957. The grant boundary forms the modern boundary between the cities of Saratoga, Los Gatos, and Monte Sereno along Quito Road.

== Grant boundaries ==
Counterclockwise and denoted with modern landmarks, the boundaries and corners of the grant were:

- The northwestern and western boundary followed San Tomas Aquino Creek from John D. Morgan Park, north of Westmont High School, and along Quito Road & Austin Way
- The western corner was near where San Tomas Aquino Creek meets Canon Drive
- The southwestern boundary roughly parallels State Route 9 about 0.75 miles to its southwest
- The southwest corner was near the Santa Cruz Avenue exit of State Route 17
- The southeast corner was near where Kennedy Road crosses Ross Creek
- The southern part of the eastern border was Ross Creek
- The eastern corner was near the corner of Camino del Cerro and Blossom Hill Road
- The northern part of the eastern border was the former natural lake in what is now Los Gatos Creek Park
- The northern boundary was along Rincon Avenue across the North end of John D. Morgan Park in central Campbell

== See also ==
- Ranchos of Santa Clara County, California
