= Three Creeks Trail =

Trail in San Jose, California, United States

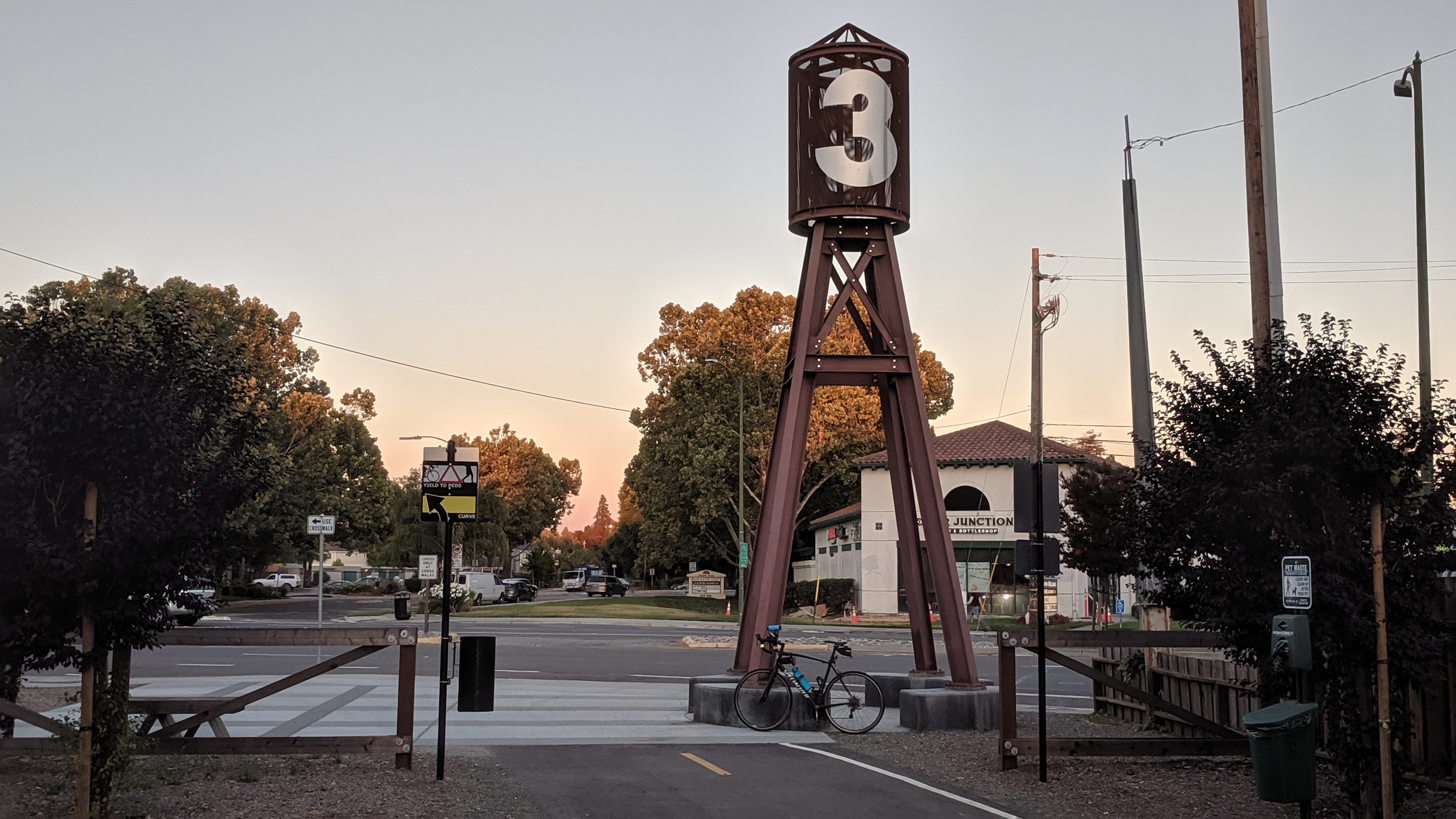
- decorative water tower with symbolic 3 for Three Creeks Trail
- Length: 0.9 miles (1.4 km)
- Location: San Jose, California
- Surface: paved

The Three Creeks Trail is a 0.9-mile (1.4 km) pedestrian and bicycle trail that runs through the Willow Glen neighborhood in San Jose, California, from Los Gatos Creek by Lonus Street to the Guadalupe River. It directly connects to the northern segment of the Los Gatos Creek Trail and indirectly connects to several other trails.

The western section of the trail has been paved since late 2018. An eastern alignment is planned, but not funded, to extend the trail to the Coyote Creek Trail.

== History ==
The trail was previously a Western Pacific Railroad line as part of the Willow Glen industrial lead of the San Jose Branch line. A trestle bridge, the Willow Glen Trestle, was built in 1921 and crossed the Los Gatos Creek near Lonus Street. A train used to travel to and from the Del Monte cannery. In the early 1980s the Union Pacific purchased the Western Pacific, the Union Pacific abandoned the line in the early 2000s

There are three large remnants of the line, a trestle built in 1921 (demolished), a girder bridge over the Guadalupe River, and a stretch of the line from the former Williams Street yard at the intersection of 23rd Street and William Street to the BART right of way with the Bayshore Highway girder bridge. Some remains of crossings over Las Plumas Avenue just south of the end of track for BART still exist along with two industrial spurs crossing Lenfest Road

By 2013 the trail was under development. Most of the western alignment was usable although mainly as dirt track.

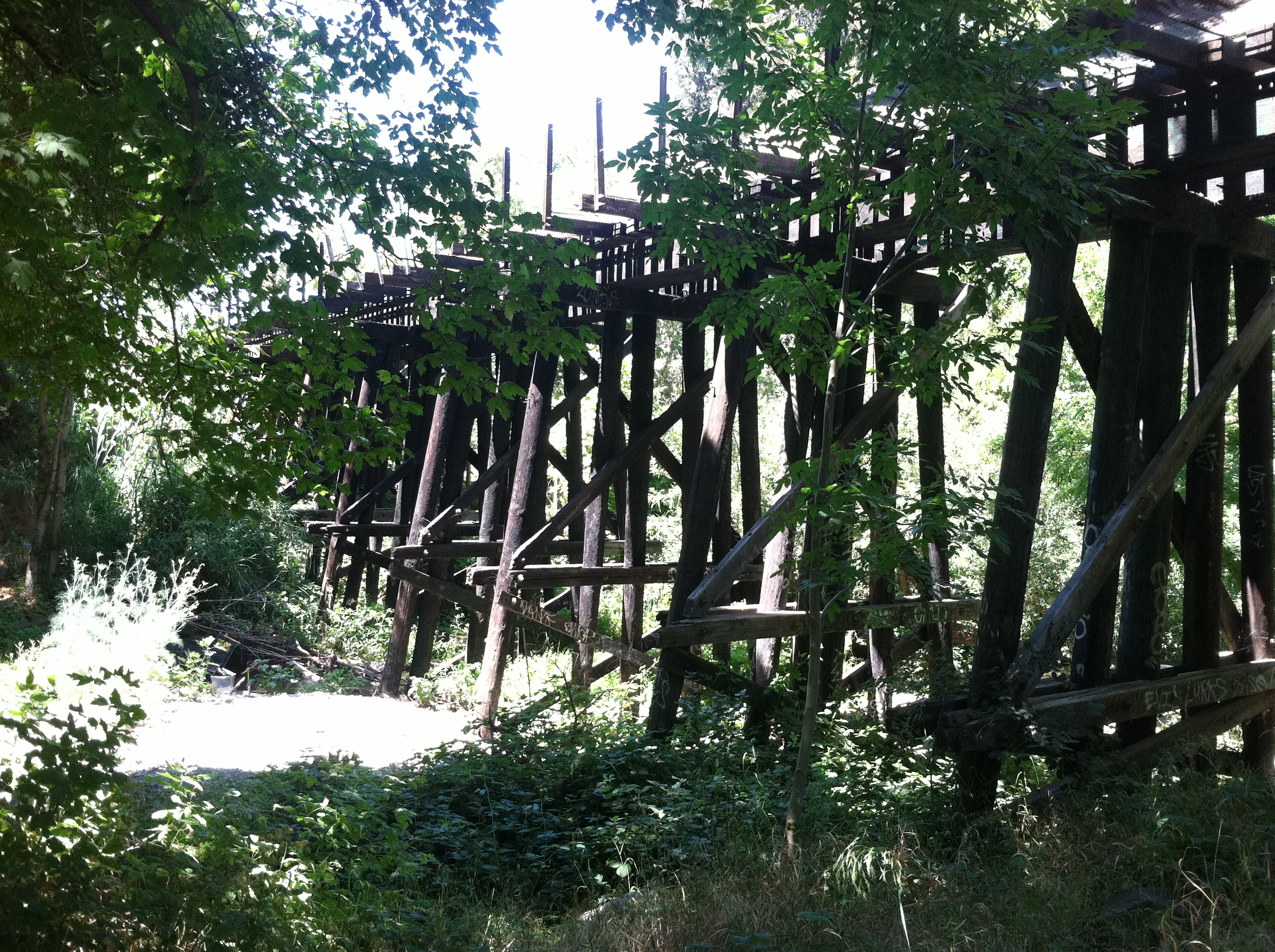
Trestle bridge seen from south bank of Los Gatos Creek near Lonus Street.

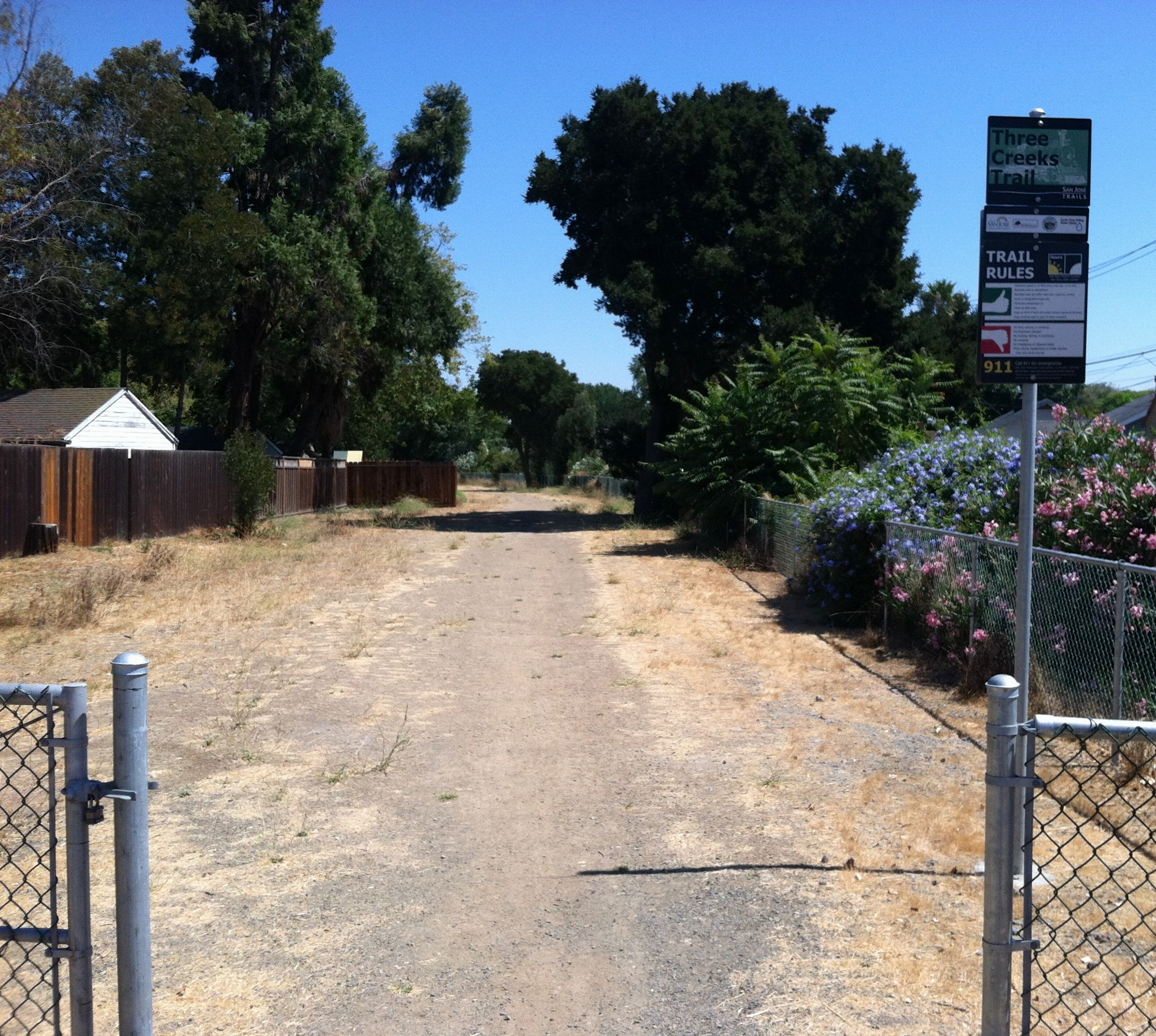
Three Creeks Trail looking south-east from Coe Avenue.

In June 2017 construction began on the section between Coe Avenue and Minnesota Avenue. It re-opened as a paved trail in August 2018.

== The route ==
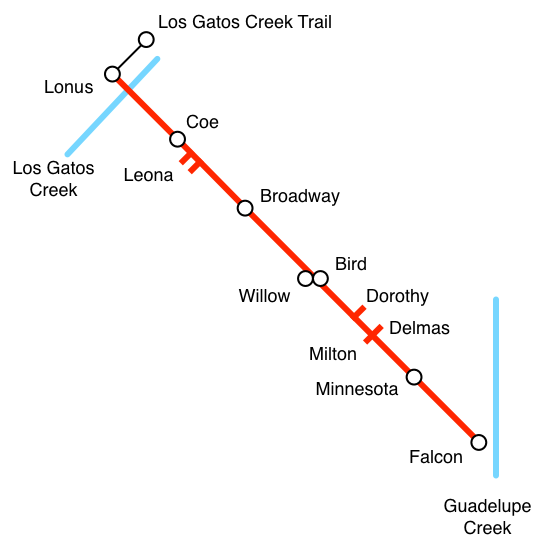
Diagrammatic map of Three Creeks Trail western alignment, San Jose, California

The trail crosses or accesses the following roads.

- Lonus Street
- Coe Avenue
- Leona Court, as access
- Broadway Avenue
- Willow Street, near the Bird Avenue intersection
- Bird Avenue
- Dorothy Avenue, as access
- Delmas Avenue and Milton Way, as access
- Minnesota Avenue
- Falcon Place passing Kyva Park

== Connections to the trail ==
=== Connection to the northern segment of the Guadalupe River Trail into central Downtown San Jose ===
The lower (northern) segment of the Guadalupe River Trail can be reached by traveling east on the bike trail on Willow Street, turning left onto Delmas Avenue and then right onto Virginia Avenue. Travel east on W. Virginia Avenue over highway 87. Access to the western bank portion of the Guadalupe River Trail is on the north side of W. Virginia Ave. Access to the eastern bank portion is on Palm Street, just north of West Virginia Street.

=== Connection to the northern segment of the Los Gatos Creek Trail into western Downtown San Jose ===
The northern segment of the Los Gatos Creek Trail, which leads into Downtown San Jose, is at Lonus Street.

=== Connection to the southern segment of the Los Gatos Creek Trail ===
The southern segment of the Los Gatos Creek Trail, which leads to Campbell and Los Gatos, connects via the on-street bike lane on Willow Avenue.

=== Connection to downtown Willow Glen ===
Downtown Willow Glen can be reached from the trail by traveling west on Willow Avenue.

=== Bicycle connection between the segments of the Los Gatos Creek Trail ===
The Three Creeks Trail provides a longer but safer bicycle connection between the main segment of the Los Gatos Creek Trail and its northern segment that connects to Downtown San Jose. For bicycles, this alternative avoids the narrow and busy Lincoln Avenue. Northbound, exit the trail just past Leigh Avenue, go northeast on the Willow Street bike lane, and connect to the Three Creeks Trail at the corner of Willow Street and Bird Avenue. Follow that trail and connect to the northern segment at Lonus Avenue. For pedestrians, the much shorter direct route is better.

=== Connection to Tamien Station and the Highway 87 Bikeway ===
Both Tamien station and the Highway 87 Bikeway, which is on the eastern side of highway 87, can be reached from the trail by heading east on Minnesota Avenue, this changes names to Alma Avenue, north on Lelong Street, through the parking lot of the light rail station, and under highway 87.

=== Connection to the south via Hervey Lane ===
The trail connects to the neighborhoods to its south via Hervey Lane.
