= Alexander Forbes (explorer) =

British merchant, explorer, and author (1778–1862)

Alexander Forbes (1778–1862) was a 19th-century Scottish merchant, explorer, and writer. His book California: A History of Upper and Lower California, published in 1839, is perhaps the first full account in English of California. He is the brother of distinguished Scottish physician Sir John Forbes.

Forbes grew up in the counties of Banffshire and Aberdeenshire. At some point, he emigrated to Tepic, Mexico, where he made his living as a merchant. He is also recorded as having been the British consul to Mexico. It was during his time here that he wrote his book. One of the remarkable aspects of the book is that Forbes wrote it without ever having visited California at the time.

At the time Forbes was writing, California was a province of Mexico. Forbes drew upon the accounts of California's Franciscan Padres to inform his work, as well as other agents, including southern California cattleman and landowner Abel Stearns. His work contains extensive descriptions of Mexican California, including accounts of California's agriculture and its landscape. Forbes advocated that the United Kingdom take control of California, and suggested that the territory might be ceded to the UK in return for forgiving Mexico's debt to the British government.

In 1846, Barron, Forbes & Co., which was composed of Forbes, Eustace Barron (who served as consul before him), and the British vice-consul to California, James Alexander Forbes (no relation), purchased the New Almaden quicksilver mines from Andrés Castillero, which proved to be extremely profitable. However, another man, José de los Reyes Berreyesa, also lay claim to the mine on the basis that it lay on land given to him in a land grant by the Mexican governor of Alta California. Furthermore, Justo Larias also claimed ownership, and the United States government even stepped in to claim that the mine lay on public land. A complex legal case involving Mexican laws and the Treaty of Guadalupe Hidalgo described by The New York Times as "one of the most remarkable civil trials in this or any other country", United States v. Andres Castillero eventually reached the United States Supreme Court whereupon it was finally decided in 1862 that, the mine was on the Larias grant, and that the furnaces and improvements of the company below the hill were on the Berreyessa grant. The company bought into these two titles and then sold the entire operation in 1864 to the Quicksilver Mining Company.

Forbes, however, had moved to London in 1848 to stay with his brother. They retired to Whitchurch-on-Thames in 1859 after his brother suffered a series of strokes. Forbes died in 1862 at the age of 84.
