= John Forbes (physician) =

Scottish physician

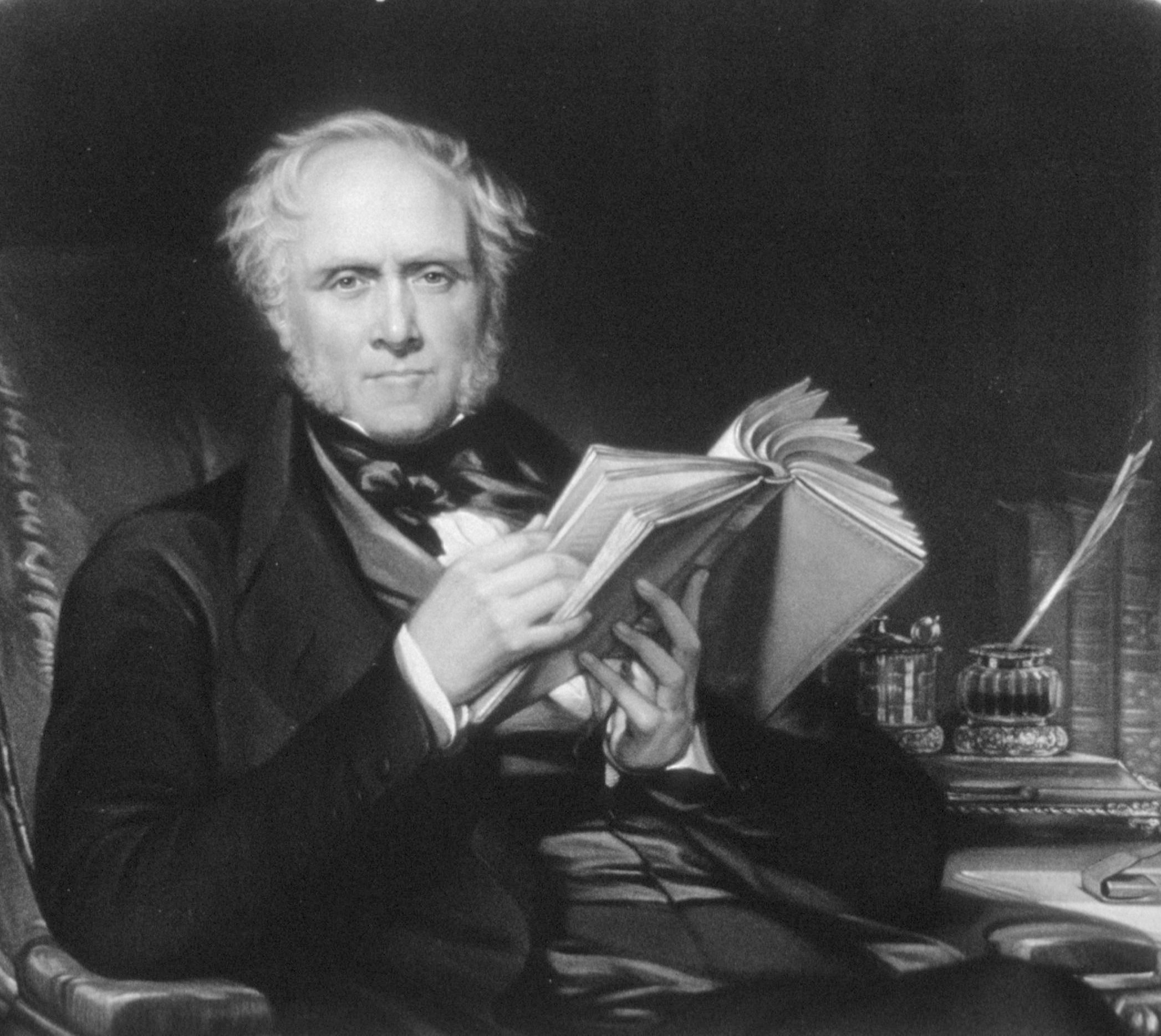
John Forbes, drawing by John Partridge

Sir John Forbes FRCP FRS (17 December 1787 – 13 November 1861) was a Scottish physician, famous for his translation of the classic French medical text De L'Auscultation Mediate by René Laennec, the inventor of the stethoscope. He was physician to Queen Victoria 1841–61.

== Life ==
Forbes was born on 17 December 1787 at Cuttlebrae, near Cullen, in the parish of Rathven, Banffshire, on the Moray Firth in North-East Scotland. His elder brother Alexander is noted for having emigrated to Tepic, Mexico, and for writing the first English-language book on California history.

To enlist as a surgeon in the Royal Navy, he proceeded to Edinburgh to obtain the Diploma of the College of Surgeons, passing the examination in February 1806. In 1807 he entered medical service as a temporary assistant surgeon. Apart from a short period of retraining in naval medicine and surgery at Haslar Hospital in 1811, he spent his time at sea. He was confirmed in the rank of full surgeon on 27 January 1809. After his career as a naval surgeon [1806–1816], Forbes then enrolled in the medical school at Edinburgh in 1816, aged 29 years. Dedicated to his work, his Latin dissertation was accepted within a year, proceeding to MD (Edin.) in August 1817.

Forbes moved to Penzance in September 1817. Between 1817 and 1822 he laid the foundations for his knowledge of the newly invented stethoscope of René Laennec (1781–1826), about the French physician's teaching on stethoscopy: De L'Auscultation Médiate (1819). Forbes translated this into English in four editions between 1821 and 1834. On 19 May 1820 Forbes married Eliza Mary Burgh (1787–1851) at Great Torrington, Devon. He contributed papers to the Royal Geological Society of Cornwall, of which he was secretary, and he was elected a Fellow of the Royal Society in 1829. Forbes and his wife moved to Chichester in 1822, where their only child, Alexander Clark Forbes, was born in 1824.

In 1836, Forbes and John Conolly started a new publication: the British and Foreign Medical Review, or, A Quarterly Journal of Practical Medicine, for which they shared the editorship from 1836 to 1839. The Review was read widely in Europe and America, and helped to promote modern methods of treatment and enhancing the reputation of British medicine.

On 15 October 1840, John Forbes resigned as senior physician at Chichester Infirmary and moved to London, taking up practice at 12 Old Burlington Street, Westminster. This proved to be a turning point in his career. He was assisted by schooldays friend, James Clark. Clark had been created a baronet for his services to the young Queen Victoria (1819–1901), who had been enthroned in 1837. Forbes was appointed court physician to Prince Albert (1819–1861) and the royal household on 15 February 1841. The Scottish physician had now reached the peak of his career, and further honours followed: Fellowship of the Royal College of Physicians was conferred on him in 1844 and honorary Fellowship of the Imperial Society of Physicians in Vienna in 1845.

In 1852 he received the honorary degree of Doctor of Civil Law by the University of Oxford, and he was knighted by Queen Victoria in 1853. As Editor of the British & Foreign Medical Review, Forbes had written an article in his journal (1846), which was thought to be in favour of Homeopathy. This clashed with the London medical establishment and contributed to the failure of his 'Review' in 1847.

A final publication 'Of Nature and Art on the Cure of Disease' based on his favourite theme of the 'vis medicatrix naturae' appeared in 1857, (second edition 1858). This emphasised that the practice of medicine should combine science with Art and set out his case for the healing powers of Nature. Sir John's book was well received both at home and abroad. After May 1860, when he resigned from the Comitia of the RCP Lond., his health declined to the point that he used a wheelchair. He retired to live at the home of his son, Alexander Clark Forbes (1824–1901) in Whitchurch-on-Thames, where he died on 13 November 1861.

In his Memorandums made in Ireland in the autumn of 1852, (1853) Forbes supported religious tolerance in Ireland.

== Publications ==
- Forbes J. (1821). A treatise on diseases of the chest in which they are described according to their anatomical characters, and there diagnosis established on a new principle by means of acoustic instruments. London: T & G Underwood.
- Forbes J. (1824). Original Cases with dissections and observations illustrating the use of the stethoscope and percussion in the diagnosis of diseases of the chest. London: T & G Underwood.
- Forbes J (1835). A manual of select medical bibliography. London: Sherwood, Gilbert and Piper.
- Forbes J. (1834–1836) Sketch of the Medical Topography of the Hundred of Penwith, comprising the district of Landsend in Transactions of the Provincial Medical and Surgical Association, volume 2, pp. 32–139 and volume 4, pp. 152–261.
- Forbes J. (1846). Ueber Sonnambulissmus, Hellsehen und thierschen Magnetismus, bearbeitet von A. Hummel, Wien.
- Forbes J. (1846). Homoeopathy, allopathy and “young physic”. British and Foreign Medical Review, 225–265.
- Forbes J. (1857). Of nature and art in the cure of disease. London: John Churchill.
- Forbes J., Conolly J., Tweedie A. (1832–35). Cyclopaedia of Practical Medicine. London: Sherwood, Gilbert and Piper.
