= James Alexander Forbes (1805–1881) =

British diplomat

- Born: January 6, 1804; Inverness, Scotland
- Died: May 6, 1881 (aged 77); Alameda, California

James Alexander Forbes (January 6, 1804 – May 6, 1881) was the British vice-consul to Mexican California as well as the first British consul to the U.S. state of California. He built a flour mill outside of San Jose, California (now known as Forbes Mill), and that land eventually became the basis of the town of Los Gatos.

== Early life ==
Born in Inverness, Scotland to John Alonzo Forbes and Marta Rodriguez, he emigrated to Argentina around the age of 12 with an uncle who owned a shipping line. He was later educated by Jesuits in Montevideo, Uruguay, and fought for Argentina during the Cisplatine War, having converted one of his uncle's ships into a man of war. He then came to California on a whaleship in 1831, and worked for a while as an accountant on the Castro Rancho San Pablo near Richmond. In 1834, he married Ana María Galindo, daughter of Jose Crisostino Galindo, majordomo of Mission Santa Clara de Asís.

He worked for Hudson's Bay Company beginning in 1836, becoming administrator of the company's affairs in California in 1845, although that office closed the following year.

He was appointed British vice-consul in 1842. While serving as vice-consul, he advocated the takeover of California by the British government; the proposal was flatly rejected. Forbes was informed that Great Britain had no desire to interfere in California politics, but that she would look with great disfavor upon such interference by any other power. This sentiment was communicated to Thomas O. Larkin, United States consul, but did little to dissuade the U.S. from annexing California in 1846.

The Forbes family lived on Rancho Potrero de Santa Clara, a 1,939-acre (7.8 km^{2}) Mexican land grant near San Jose received from Governor Manuel Micheltorena in 1844. The rancho and cattle were sold in 1847 to Commodore Robert F. Stockton for US$10,500, a high price for the time. The couple had a total of twelve children, three daughters and nine sons. In 1851, he persuaded the Jesuits to establish a school at Mission Santa Clara to educate his sons; this school formed the basis of what would become Santa Clara University. Five of the Forbes sons were part of the first class at Santa Clara College.

== New Almaden ==
He was also an early investor in the New Almaden quicksilver mine with Alexander Forbes, British consul to Mexico and author of one of the first histories of California in the English language. Their company had purchased the title to the mine from Andrés Castillero in 1846, and it proved to be extremely profitable. However, José de los Reyes Berreyesa also laid claim to the mine on the basis that it lay on Rancho San Vicente. Furthermore, Berreyesa's neighbor Justo Larios of Rancho Los Capitancillos also claimed ownership. Even the United States government stepped in to claim that the mine lay on public land between the two grants. A complex legal case involving Mexican laws and the Treaty of Guadalupe Hidalgo described by The New York Times as "one of the most remarkable civil trials in this or any other country", United States v. Andres Castillero eventually reached the United States Supreme Court whereupon it was finally decided in 1862 that, the mine was on the Larias grant, and that the furnaces and improvements of the company below the hill were on the Berreyessa grant. The company bought into these two titles and then sold the entire operation in 1864 to the Quicksilver Mining Company.

== Los Gatos ==
Forbes' lasting legacy, however, is the town of Los Gatos. In 1850, noticing that there was no local production of flour (it was being imported from Chile), he purchased about 2,000 acres (8.1 km^{2}) of Rancho Rinconada de Los Gatos from José María Hernandez with the intent of building a mill on Los Gatos Creek. In 1853 he raised the money for the construction, and in 1854 the mill was built. After many delays, the mill started grinding flour on December 1, 1855. However, the location Forbes chose was unfortunate, as there was only enough water in the creek to power the mill during the winter months. This, coupled with the delays in its opening which allowed competitors into the market thus dropping flour prices from a lucrative $50/barrel to a mere $5, meant that it was not generating enough income and eventually Forbes was forced into bankruptcy, much of his money also being tied up in litigation with regards to the mine. In 1858, he was evicted due to non-payment of the loan. However, a town sprang up around the mill and was initially known as Forbestown before changing its name to Los Gatos.

== Personality ==
Based on a collection of Forbes's letters, Los Gatos historian William A. Wulf describes Forbes as "a suede-shoe man [i.e., a devious individual]. He was bright, and better educated than most men in California when he first arrived. But he was basically a bad guy who ended up losing control of circumstances." When the Jesuits arrived from Oregon to Mission Santa Clara, they asked him to move out of the mission, which he did, but not before getting $11,000 from them. He then used this money to build a mansion right behind the mission. Later, he sold this to a group of nuns, neglecting to tell them there was a $20,000 lien on the house. Also, according to the Hernandez family, Forbes never paid $8,000 he owed for the Los Gatos rancho. With regards to his marriage, he is described as having treated his wife as a servant, often not allowing her to converse with dinner guests; instead she was made to help the other servants.

Forbes died in 1881, in Alameda.

== Notes ==
relationship: The two Forbes are often confused for each other, as J. A. Forbes is sometimes described as the author of the California history book. It is also unclear if the two were related. Some sources describe them as unrelated, but others describe Alexander as James Alexander's uncle.
