= Rancho Potrero de Santa Clara =

Mexican land grant in California

- Location in Santa Clara County, California
- 37°21′0″N 121°55′12″W
- Location: Santa Clara County, California

California Historical Landmark
- Official name: First Successful Introduction of the Honeybee to California landmark
- Designated: September 15, 1981
- Reference no.: 945

Rancho Potrero de Santa Clara was a 1,939-acre (7.85 km^{2}) Mexican land grant in present day Santa Clara County, California given in 1844 by Governor Manuel Micheltorena to James Alexander Forbes. The name refers to the "pasture lands" of Santa Clara Mission. The grant was between the Santa Clara Mission and the Pueblo of San José, south of the present day San Jose International Airport.

== History ==
James Alexander Forbes (1805–1881), born in Scotland, came to Yerba Buena in 1831. He moved to the Santa Clara Valley, where married Maria Ana Galindo, whose father, José Crisóstomo Galindo, was the majordomo of the Santa Clara Mission. Forbes was granted the one square league Rancho Potrero de Santa Clara in 1844. Forbes sold the Rancho to Commodore Robert F. Stockton in 1847.

With the cession of California to the United States following the Mexican-American War, the 1848 Treaty of Guadalupe Hidalgo provided that the land grants would be honored. As required by the Land Act of 1851, a claim for Rancho Potrero de Santa Clara was filed with the Public Land Commission in 1852, and the grant was patented to Robert F. Stockton in 1861. A second claim was filed by José M. Fuentes, but was rejected due to lack of evidence.

In the 1862 Stockton sold the rancho to Charles B. Polhemus and Henry Newhall, who planned to run railroad tracks through the valley.

== Landmark status ==
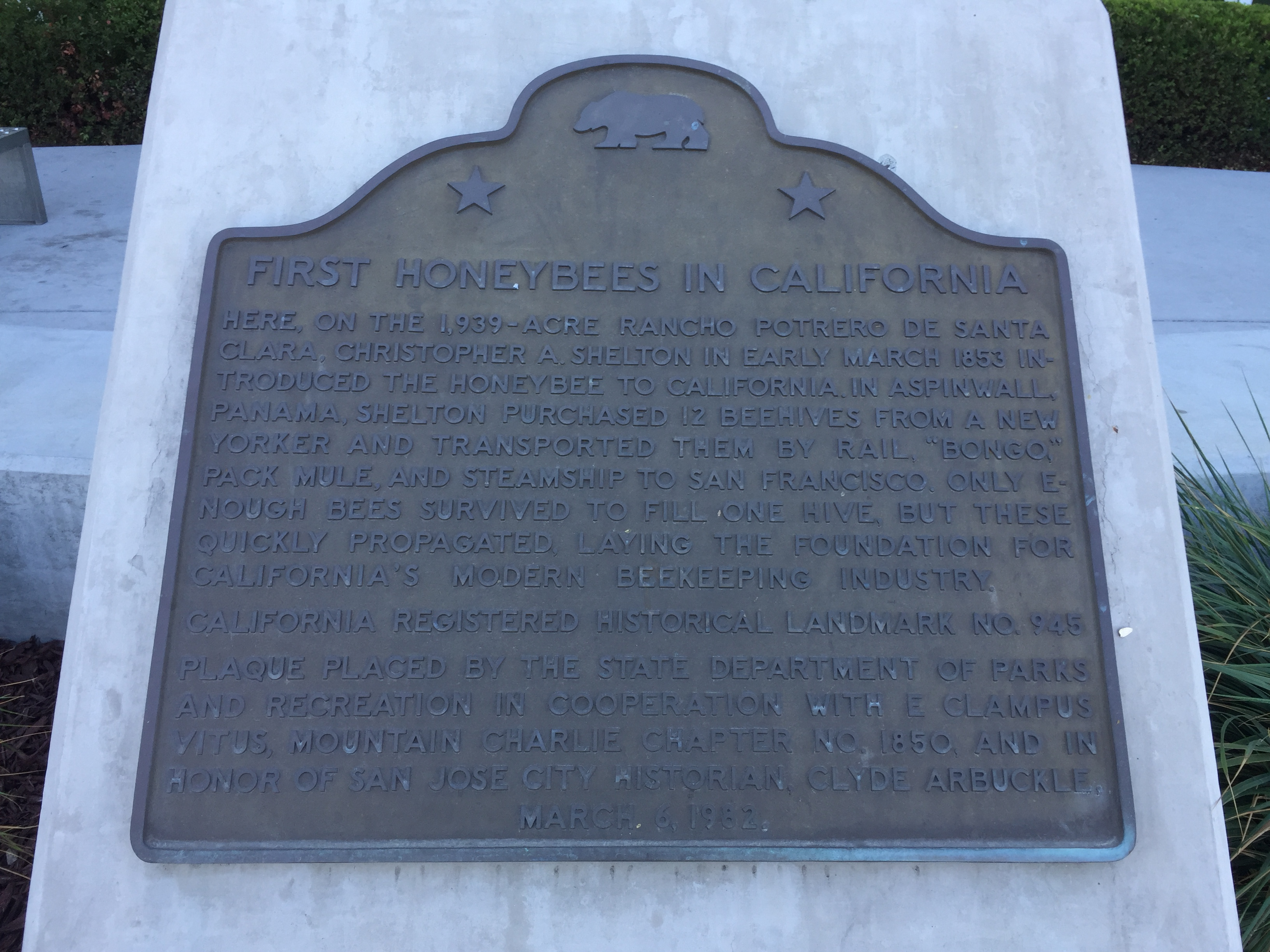
First Successful Introduction of the Honeybee to California landmark #945

On September 15, 1981, the State Historic Preservation Office designated the first successful introduction of the Honey bee to California as a California historical landmark #945. A description on the commemorative plaque reads: "Here, on the 1,939-acre Rancho Potrero de Santa Clara, Christopher A. Shelton in early March 1853 introduced the honeybee to California. In Aspinwall, Panama, Shelton purchased 12 beehives from a New Yorker and transported them by rail, 'bongo,' pack mule, and steamship to San Francisco. Only enough bees survived to fill one hive, but these quickly propagated, laying the foundation for California's modern bee-keeping industry."

== See also ==
- List of ranchos of California
