= New Museum Los Gatos =

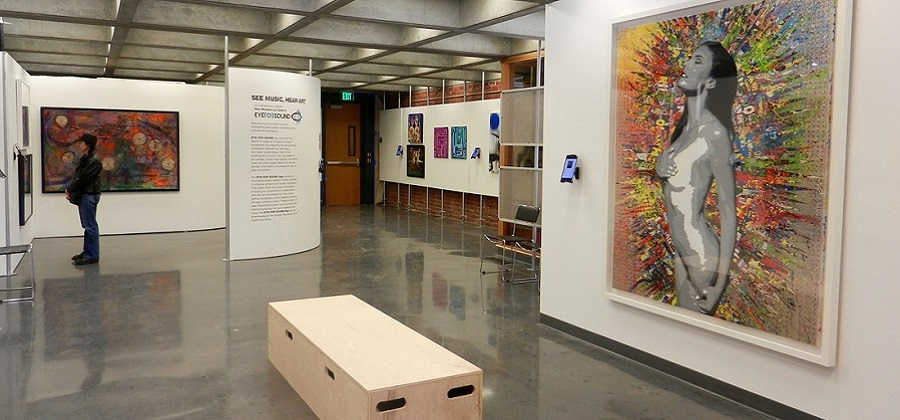
- NUMU Exhibit
- Established: 1965 as the Museums of Los Gatos; 2015 as New Museum Los Gatos
- Location: 106 E. Main Street; Los Gatos, California
- Coordinates: 37.2207°N 121.9792°W
- Type: Art, history museum
- Website: www.numulosgatos.org

New Museum Los Gatos (NUMU), formerly the Museums of Los Gatos founded in 1965, is a public non-profit art and history museum located in the Civic Center Plaza in downtown Los Gatos, California. NUMU has over 4000 visitors a year.

== History ==
Formerly The Museums of Los Gatos, consisting of The Los Gatos Museum (an art museum) and Forbes Mill (a history museum), New Museum Los Gatos (NUMU) opened in June 2015 with three times more exhibition space than the previous main location, allowing it to better serve as a community hub for all ages with fresh perspectives on San Francisco Bay Area history, art and innovations. The Los Gatos Museum Association’s 50th anniversary occurred in 2015.

The rebranding, redesign, and reopening was led by Executive Director Lisa Coscino, who assisted in the change and rebranding of the Museum of Monterey (MoM) in 2011. NUMU consists of the collections of former Art Museum of Los Gatos on Tait Avenue and the History Museum at Forbes Mill, previously known as the Museums of Los Gatos, which were established in 1965.

== Exhibitions ==
New Museum Los Gatos contains 2 floors of gallery spaces hosting around 10 rotating art and history exhibitions annually. The 6,000 square foot building is located in the Los Gatos Civic Center at 106 E. Main Street.

== Programs ==
NUMU offers in-person and virtual programs, workshops, youth programs, classes, and artist talks. The MakerSpace is a multifaceted studio where students and their families can explore, discover, and create. This space offers hands-on workshops, family art days, and Girl Scout Badge programs for all to learn new methods of creation under the guidance of expert artists and designers, as well as opportunities for the entire family to explore a variety of materials, art forms, and expressions. Programs are inspired by current exhibitions and the art and history on view in the galleries.

The Flick Studio offers traditional artistic training through full-curriculum studio classes for artists of all levels to learn new skills and further develop those they already have. Drawing and painting workshops include: figure drawing, oil painting, and embroidery workshops.
