= Los Gatos Creek Park =

County park in Campbell, California

Coordinates: 37°16′12″N 121°57′00″W

Los Gatos Creek Park is a county park in Campbell, California, a town that is bisected by the Los Gatos Creek. The park is operated by the Santa Clara County Parks and Recreation Department.

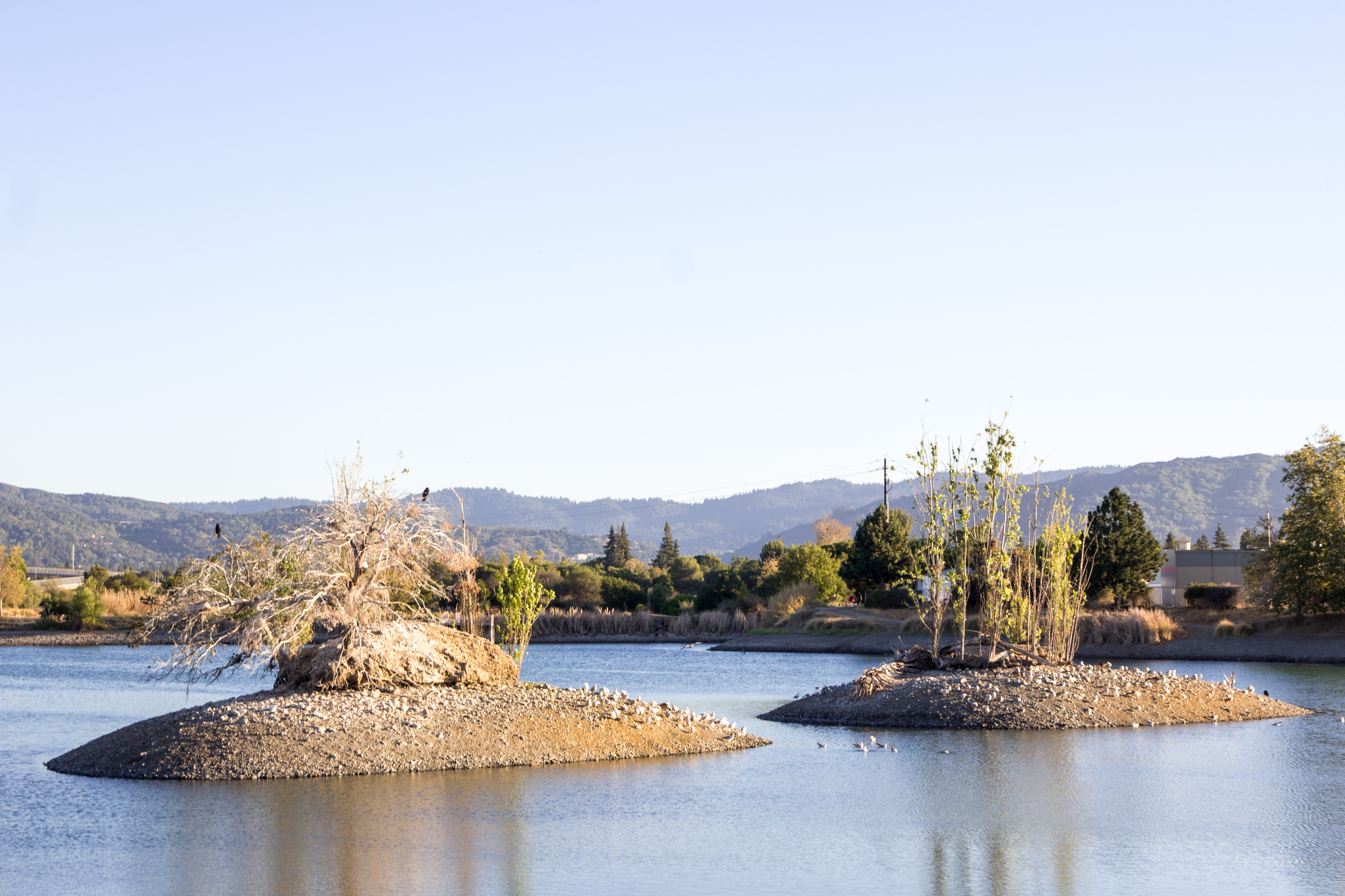
Pond in Los Gatos Creek County Park

== Main access ==
The main entrance for vehicular, bike and pedestrian access is via Lost Lake Lane, which is reached via Dell Avenue, just north of East Hacienda Avenue. A parking lot is at the end of the access lane. The San Tomas Expressway exit from California State Route 17 that runs just to the east of the park provides easy access via Winchester Blvd south and East Hacienda Avenue.

== Bike and pedestrian access via the Los Gatos Creek Trail ==
The Los Gatos Creek Trail runs through the park, north and south. There is a nearby trail access point from the south at Knowles Drive through a parking lot. There are nearby trail access points from the north at the south side of the trail underpass of San Tomas Expressway and at the south end of Camden Avenue through a parking lot.

Along the trail, downtown Campbell and the Pruneyard Shopping Center are further to the north and Vasona Park and downtown Los Gatos are further to the south.

A bike and pedestrian bridge across highway 17 provides access from the east. The bridge terminates onto Mozart Avenue, which continues onto Bascom Avenue just north of Highway 85.

== Facilities ==
A pavilion and picnic tables are present. The Los Gatos Creek County Dog Park and two casting ponds are located at the northern end of the park. The dog park has separated small dog and large dog sections.

== The lake ==
The lake in the park is a reshaped version of a natural lake. That lake was on the eastern boundary of the historic Rancho Rinconada de Los Gatos.
