= Los Gatos Creek Trail =

Pedestrian and bicycle trail in Santa Clara County, CA

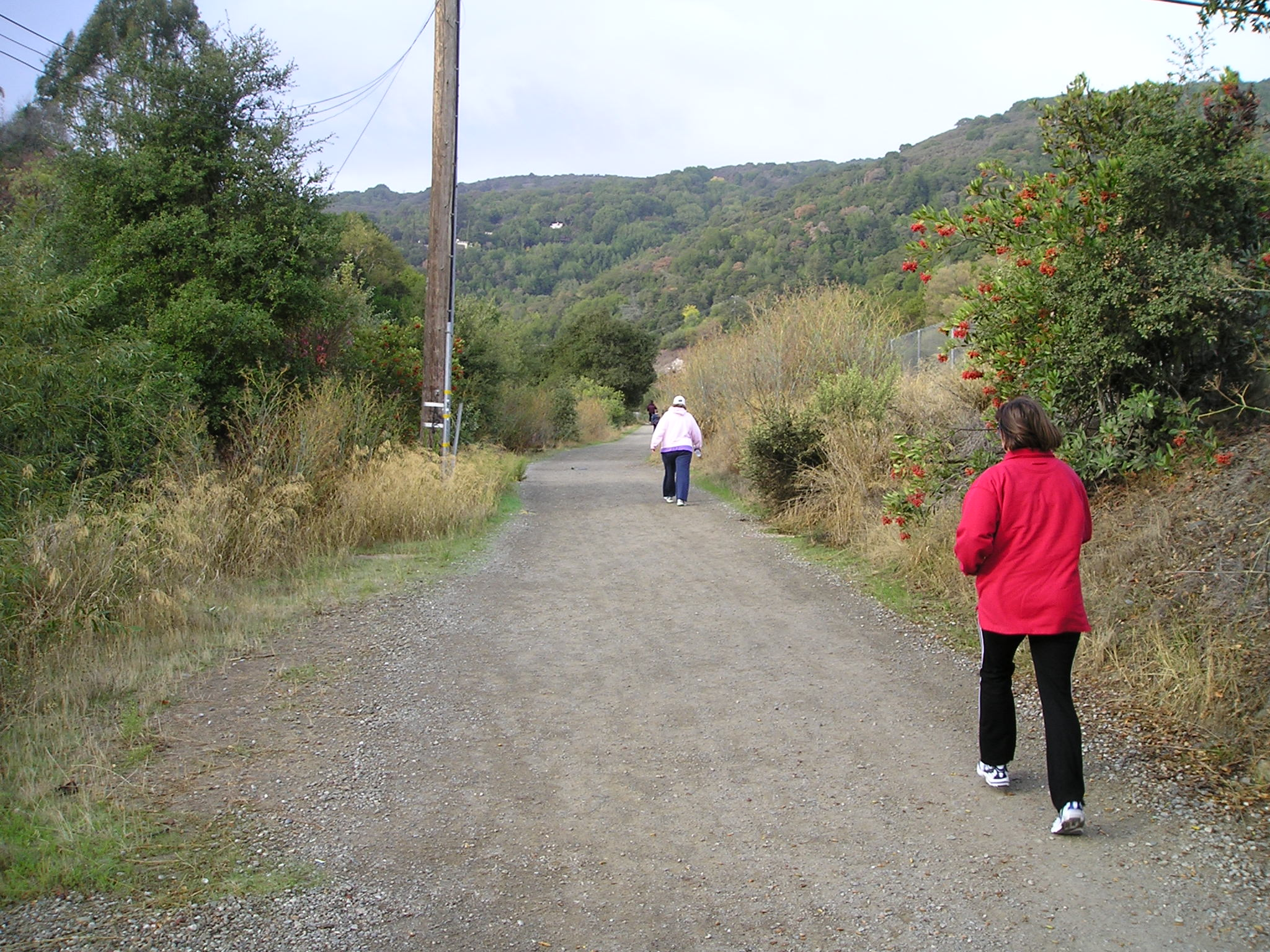
Los Gatos Creek Trail south of downtown

The main segment of the Los Gatos Creek Trail is a 9.7-mile (15.6 km) pedestrian and bicycle trail that runs through western Santa Clara County in California. It runs from Lexington Reservoir in Los Gatos, California through Campbell, California to Meridian Avenue in San Jose, California alongside Los Gatos Creek.

The half-mile northern segment runs from Lonus Street under I-280 to Dupont Street in downtown San Jose.

The trail is part of a fabric of trails that connect the Lexington Reservoir with the San Francisco Bay Trail on mostly class 1 trails.

== Markers ==
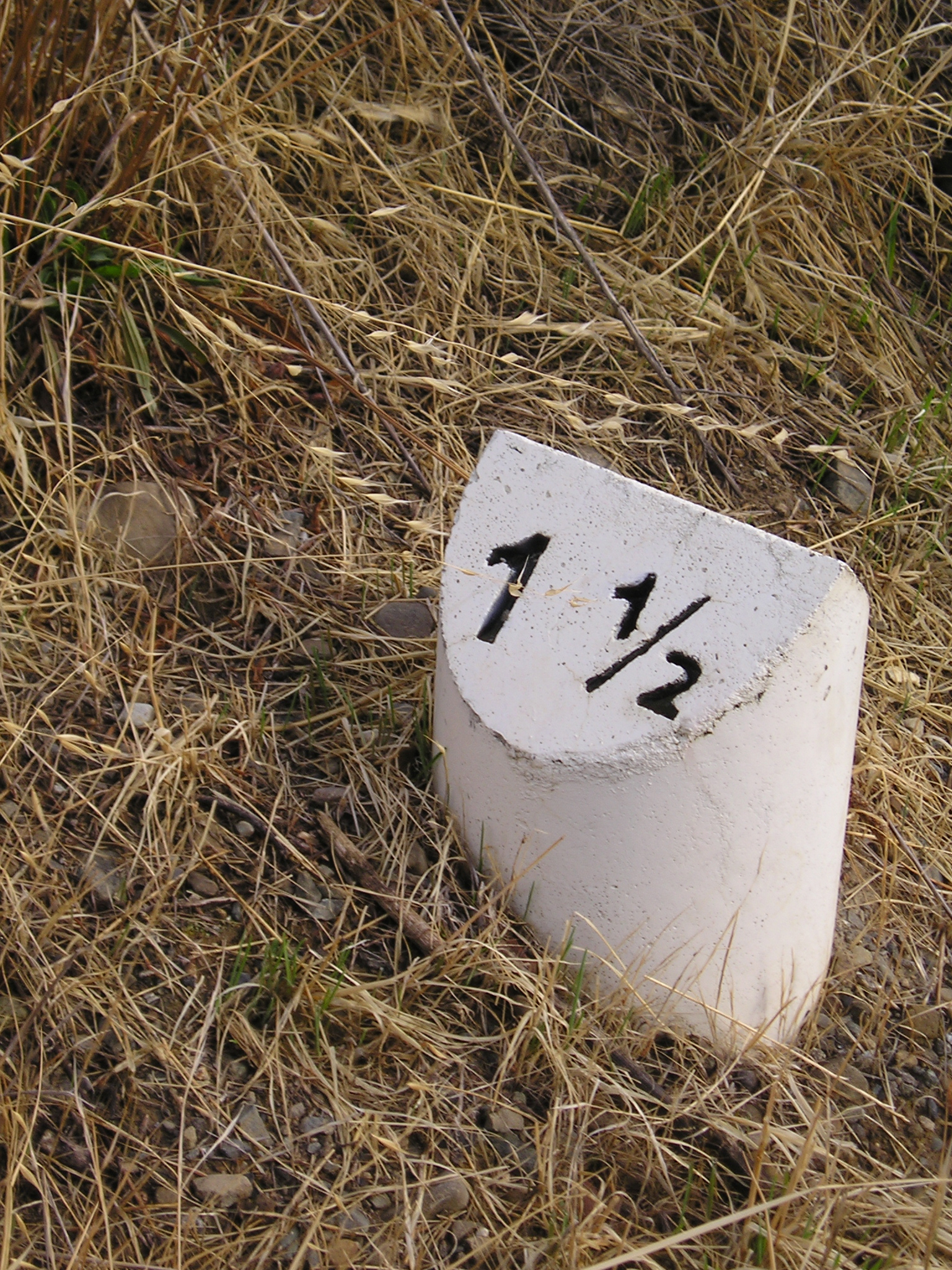
Mile marker on the trail

There are mile markers on the main segment of the Los Gatos Creek trail, with the mile zero marker being located about 100 feet (30 m) north of the trailhead from Alma Bridge Road at the southern end of the trail at Lexington Reservoir. The first half-mile offers a significant drop in elevation.

== The route ==
The route is, starting from the south and progressing north:

=== Lexington Reservoir to Los Gatos ===
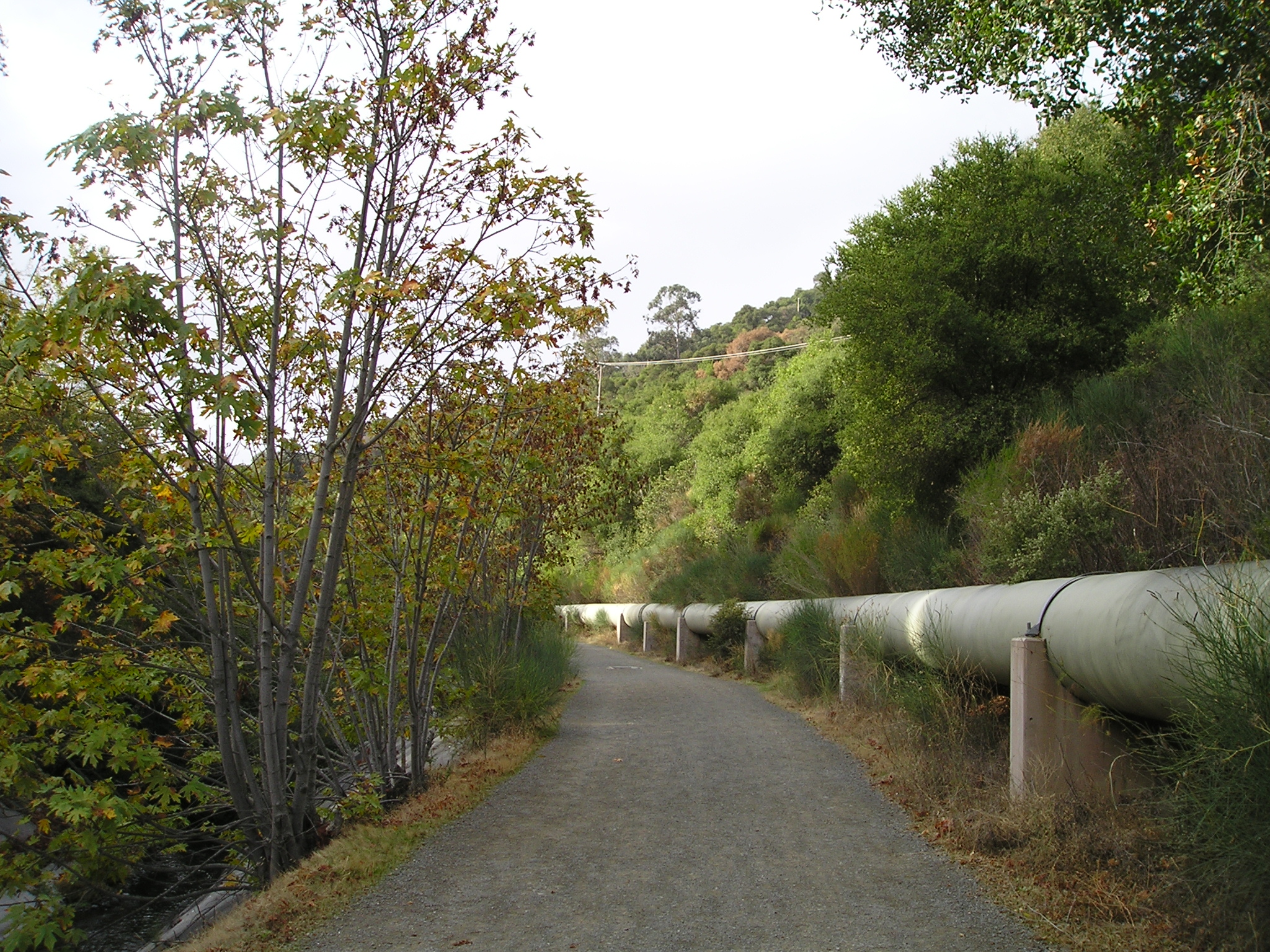
Below Lexington Reservoir, the trail runs alongside the highway, electrical lines, a water pipe from the Reservoir, and the concrete culvert containing the creek, while still providing a walk in the woods.

There are two trails between Lexington Reservoir and downtown Los Gatos. The portion of the trail on the west side of the creek is the Los Gatos Creek Trail proper and is a smooth, wide, unpaved trail on an old South Pacific Coast Railroad railway bed and has no access points after the start of the trail at the east side of the dam.

The portion on the east side of the creek starts as the Jones Trail about 300 feet east of the start of the main trail at the reservoir. It connects to both Jones Road and the Flume Trail, both of which lead to downtown Los Gatos. The north portion of the Flume Trail is for pedestrians only, as it is windy and goes down to the stream level in several places. Jones Road is an alternative for cyclists. The Jones and Flume trails connect with Novitiate Park and the St. Joseph's Hill Open Space Preserve. There is access and a limited amount of parking available in Novitiate Park and at the end of Jones Road.

=== Downtown Los Gatos ===
As the trail reaches downtown Los Gatos, the first access point is at the Main Street bridge. The trail then passes an access point at the 1854 Forbes Mill, which formerly housed a history museum. From this point northward the trail is paved. It then crosses from the east to the west of Highway 17 via a dedicated bridge. Nearby there are access points at the end of Lundy Lane and immediately behind the Old Town shopping area.

250 yd (230 m) to the north, there is an access point that can be reached via Miles Avenue. Located there is a parking lot with a few spaces useful for the trail next to Balzer Field. The trail then reaches Highway 9, where a bridge leads to a ramp on the south side of the highway. The trail then passes under the highway, and a switchback ramp reaches the north side of the highway. The trail then parallels Highway 17 before turning away to reach Roberts Road.

=== Vasona Lake County Park ===
There is an access point just south of Blossom Hill Road on Roberts Road before the trail goes under the road. The trail next runs through Oak Meadow Park and Vasona Park, and there are access points from the parking lots of both parks. Attractions in this pair of parks include the Billy Jones Wildcat Railroad and a Lockheed T-33A airplane on which kids can crawl. The trail follows the east side of the lake and goes downhill just east of the dam.

Additional pedestrian/bike access exists from the two parks. Via Oak Meadow Park there is access near the corner of Blossom Hill Drive and University Avenue. Via Vasona Park there is access from the west at University Avenue and Pepper Tree Lane and from the north at Garden Hill Drive. Further north along the trail, there are access points at the trail underpass of Lark Avenue, at Charter Oaks Drive, and from behind the Netflix campus.

=== Los Gatos Creek County Park ===
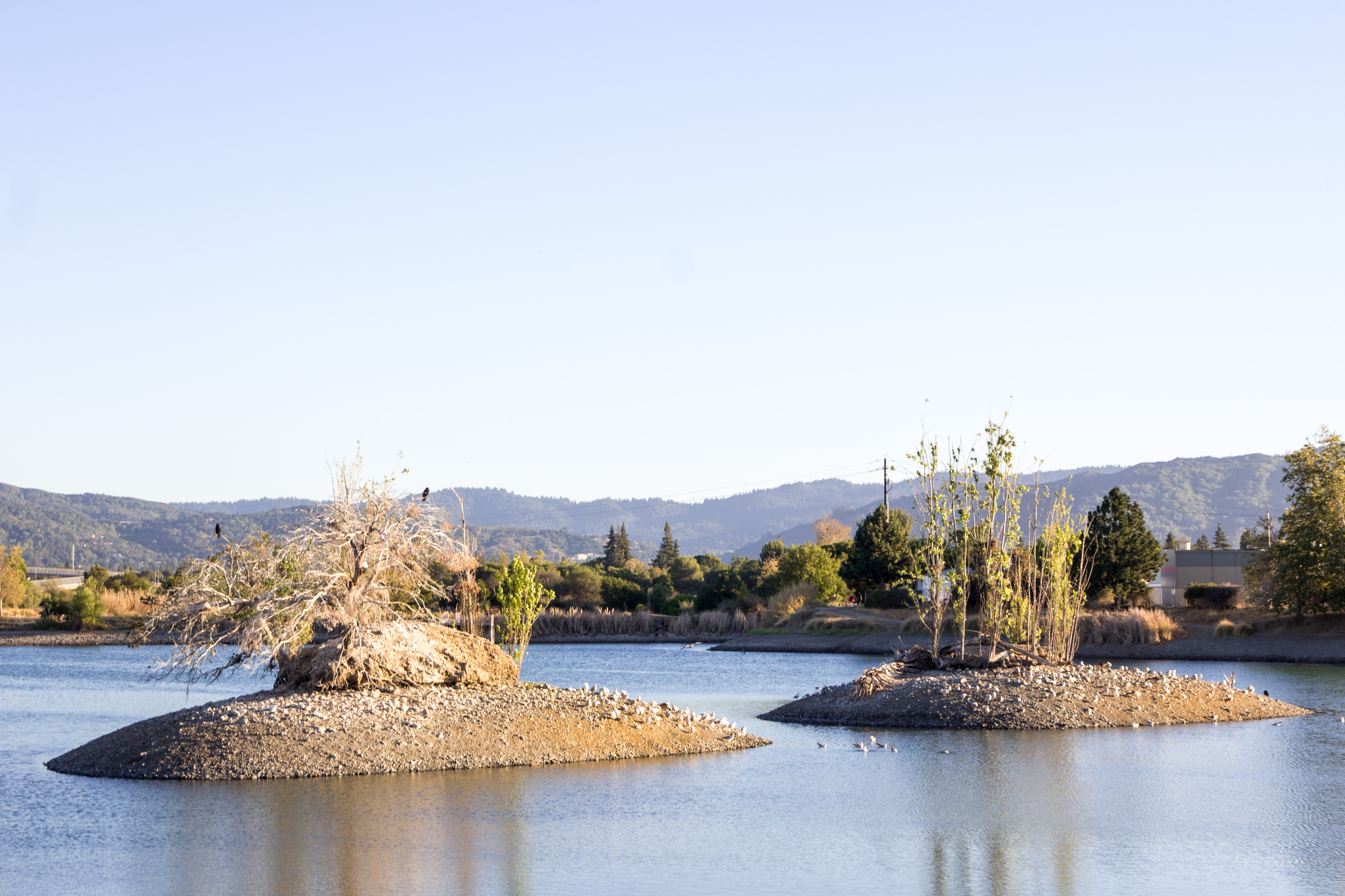
Camden Ponds in Los Gatos Creek County Park - panoramio

After travelling under Highway 85, the trail next enters Los Gatos Creek Park. Attractions in this park include fishing, a casting pond, and a dog park. There are access points through a parking lot at 120 Knowles Drive, at the main park entrance on Lost Lake Lane, on the south side of the trail underpass of San Tomas Expressway, and through the parking lot at 980 Camden Avenue.

This park also features a bridge to the east side of Los Gatos Creek that connects to additional trails around the two large percolation ponds there. This eastern portion of the park also provides access to the bridge across Highway 17 (see section below). Also on the east side are an access point at the north end of Oka Lane and a dirt trail access point at the south side of San Tomas Expressway.

=== Campbell Park and Downtown Campbell access ===
The trail is present on both sides of the creek from the bridge just north of San Tomas Expressway/Camden Avenue to the bridge at Campbell Park. The western side trail goes through Campbell Park, and from the north side of the park downtown Campbell is only three blocks to the west via Campbell Avenue. North of the bridge at Campbell Park, the trail continues only on the eastern side of the creek.

A third trail, a parallel mountain bike single-track also exists east of the trail on the east side of the creek between the trail and the freeway for much of the distance between the two bridges.

=== The Pruneyard ===
The trail next passes by the back of the Pruneyard Shopping Center in Campbell. The access point is at the northwest corner of the complex, behind the parking structure. The Pruneyard has offices, shops, restaurants, and a movie theater. Another access point just to the north is at Creekside Way.

=== Bridge and Willow Street exit ===
There are access points at the trail underpasses of Bascom Avenue and Leigh Avenue. The trail next crosses Los Gatos Creek via a bridge just east of Leigh Avenue. At this same point, the trail has an exit onto Willow Street and its on-street bike lane.

=== Willow Glen endpoint of the main segment ===
The trail next heads through San Jose's Willow Glen neighborhood, ending at Meridian Avenue. No trail exists between the terminus of the main, southern segment of the trail onto Meridian Avenue and the start of the northern segment, off of Lonus Street.

=== Connection to the northern segment of the trail ===
The City of San Jose suggests that trail users connect from the main trail to the northern segment by exiting the main trail onto Willow Street approximately 0.8 mi (1.3 km) short of the terminus on Meridian, then proceeding northeast along Willow Street, left on Glen Eyrie Avenue, left on Lincoln Avenue, and then right on Lonus Street. See the discussion below of a longer bicycle connection via the Three Creeks Trail.

=== Northern segment of the trail into western Downtown San Jose ===
The northern segment of trail connects Lonus and Dupont Streets. Lonus is a stub street extending west/northwest from Lincoln Avenue, approximately 9/10 mi (1.4 km) northeast of the main trail's terminus on Meridian. The resumed trail travels north along the creek under I-280, providing a key link for the trail as a whole by connecting Willow Glen and Downtown San Jose. This section continues past the dog park portion of Del Monte Park and terminates at Dupont Street, a stub street that runs parallel to West San Carlos Street, approximately 1/2 mi (0.80 km) directly south of the San Jose Diridon station.

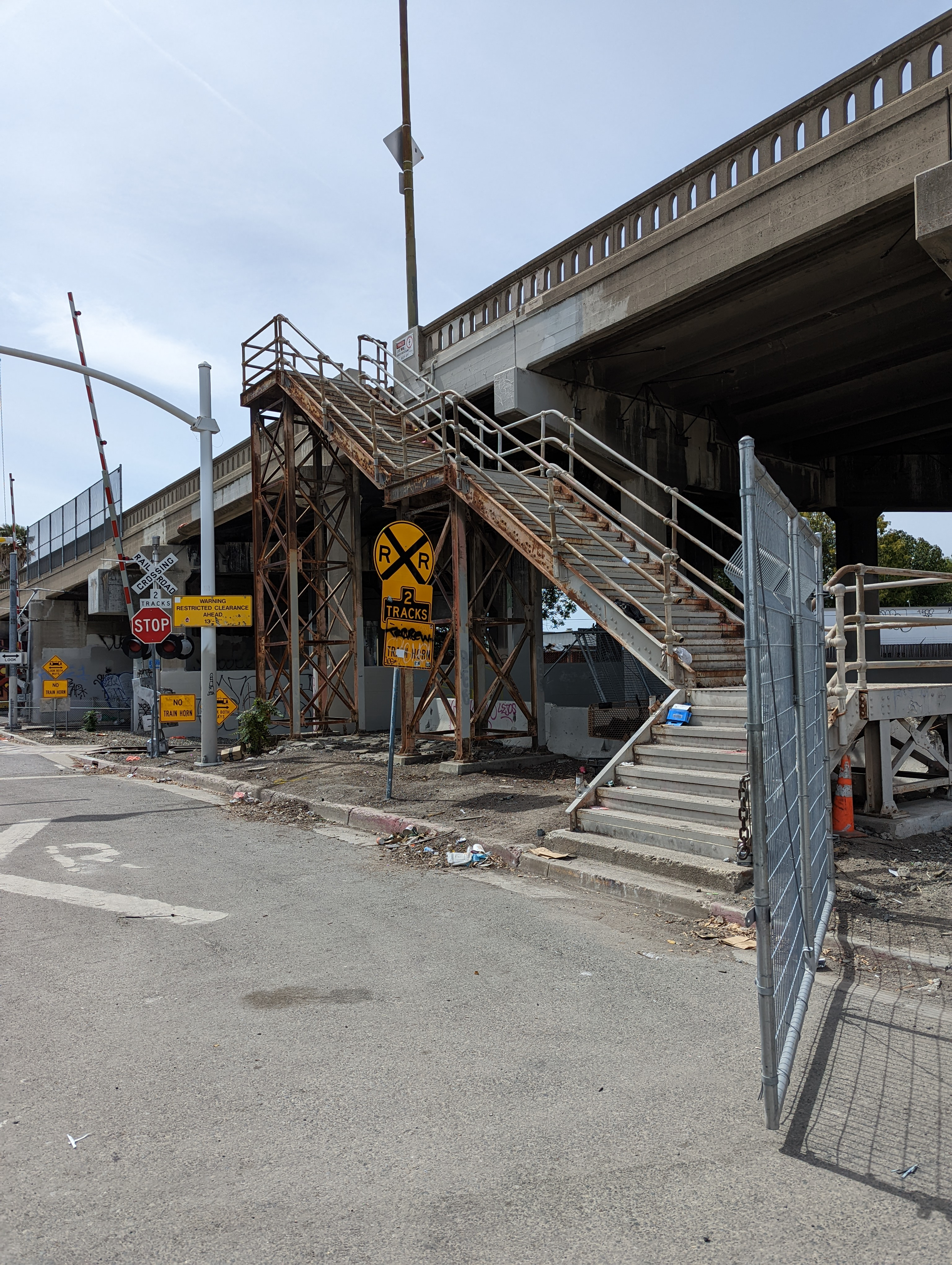
Stairs to San Carlos St Overpass

The terminus of the trail at Dupont is immediately below a set of stairs that allows easy access to the bridge that carries West San Carlos Street over the creek and the Caltrain lines. This bridge connects the trail into central downtown San Jose and the east side of the train station. The west side of the train station can be reached via Dupont Street, McEvoy Street, and Laurel Grove Lane.

== Connections to the Los Gatos Creek Trail ==
=== Connection to the Los Gatos-Saratoga Road bike lanes ===
On the south side of Highway 9, the connection between the bike lanes and the trail is via a ramp along with a bridge over the creek to reach the trail. On the north side of the highway, a switchback trail connects to the trail.

=== Blossom Hill Road bridge project over Highway 17 ===
The Town of Los Gatos has a current project in design to add a new pedestrian/bicycle bridge over Highway 17 just south of the Blossom Hill Road vehicle bridge. A dedicated path between the two sections of Roberts Road will accompany the bridge. This project will connect to the west section of Roberts Road just north of the trail access point and provide a safe connection across the freeway.

=== Highway 17 bridge connection to Bascom Avenue ===
Near the southern end of Los Gatos Creek County Park, a bridge across the creek provides access to the eastern section of the park. From there, a pedestrian and bike bridge across highway 17 connects to three streets: Kilmer Avenue, Beethoven Lane, and E. Mozart Avenue. These streets all connect to Bascom Avenue in the area just north of Highway 85.

=== Connection to the Guadalupe River Trail into central Downtown San Jose ===
The Guadalupe River Trail can be reached in two ways.

The first route is from the southern segment. Exit the trail near Leigh Avenue and travel east on the bike trail on Willow Street. Turn left onto Delmas Avenue and then right onto Virginia Avenue. Travel east on W. Virginia Avenue over highway 87. The trail on the western bank of the river starts on the north side of W. Virginia Avenue, just east of the bridge over highway 87. The trail on the eastern bank of the river starts from Palm Street, just north of West Virginia Street.

The second route is from the northern terminus of the northern segment. Climb the stairs to San Carlos, travel east on San Carlos, north on Barack Obama Avenue, east on Santa Clara Street, and then down the access stairs to the trail on the eastern bank of the river.

=== Connection to the Three Creeks Trail ===
The Three Creeks Trail connects to the northern segment of the Los Gatos Creek Trail at Lonus Avenue. This connection provides a good path between the eastern part of Willow Glen and Downtown San Jose.

=== Bicycle connection between the trail segments via Three Creeks Trail ===
The Three Creeks Trail provides a longer but safer bicycle connection to Downtown San Jose from the main trail segment. For northbound bicycles, a good alternative connection that avoids the narrow and busy Lincoln Avenue is to exit the trail just past Leigh Avenue, go northeast on the Willow Street bike lane, and then connect to the Three Creeks Trail at the corner of Willow Street and Bird Avenue. Go northwest for the connection to downtown. For pedestrians, the shorter route listed above is fine.

=== Connection between the Lexington Reservoir and the Bay Trail ===
The Los Gatos Creek Trail is a part of a fabric of trails that connect the Lexington Reservoir to the San Francisco Bay Trail on mostly class 1 trails. The path starts on the main segment of the Los Gatos Creek Trail and continues on a street connection to the Lower Guadalupe River Trail as detailed above. It then follows the Lower Guadalupe River Trail all of the way to Alviso and connects to two portions of the Bay Trail as detailed on the page for the Guadalupe River Trail.

== Mileage and elevation ==
- 0.0 – Alma Bridge Road (660 ft)
- 1.5 – Main Street (400 ft)
- 2.1 – Miles Road
- 2.3 – Saratoga-Los Gatos Road (Highway 9)
- 2.9 – Roberts Road
- 4.3 – Vasona Dam (300 ft)
- 4.7 – Lark Avenue
- 6.3 – Los Gatos Creek County Park (200 ft)
- 6.5 – Camden Avenue / San Tomas Expressway
- 7.7 – Campbell Avenue (170 ft)
- 8.0 – Highway 17
- 8.4 – Hamilton Avenue
- 8.6 – Bascom Avenue
- 9.2 – Leigh Avenue
- 10.0 – Meridian Avenue (120 ft)
