= Forbes Mill =

Historic place in California, United States

- Forbes Mill Annex
- U.S. National Register of Historic Places
- California Historical Landmark
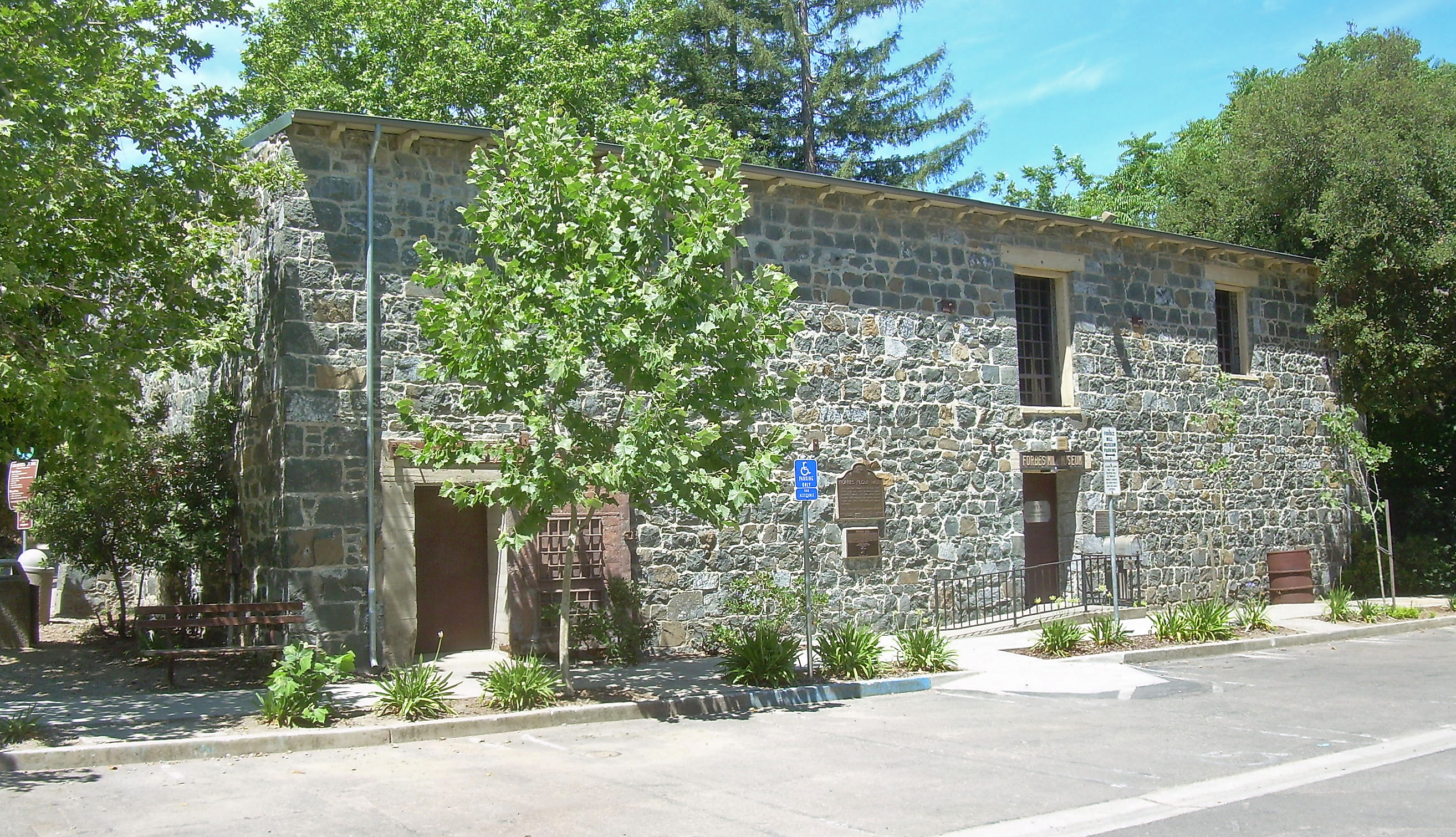
- Location: Los Gatos, California
- Coordinates: 37°13′20.03″N 121°58′49.87″W
- Built: 1880
- Architect: James Alexander Forbes
- NRHP reference No.: 78000776
- CHISL No.: 458
- Added to NRHP: July 31, 1978

Forbes Mill is a now-defunct flour mill originally built in 1854 located in Los Gatos, California, which served as the History Museum of Los Gatos after having been saved from destruction in 1982. The museum closed in 2014, and its collections are now part of New Museum Los Gatos. The building is currently owned by the city.

The mill is the first commercial building to be established in the city of Los Gatos. The existing two-story building is actually a storage annex, which was added to the original four-story stone mill building in the fall of 1880.

Forbes Mill was built as the Santa Rosa Flour Mill by James Alexander Forbes, who was born in Scotland in 1805. He came to California in about 1831 and served as Vice-Consul in San Francisco for the British government.

The California Gold Rush gave James the idea to put up a flour mill because there were none in this area at the time, and the price of flour was running at $50/barrel. He found a location on Los Gatos Creek that he thought would provide sufficient water power. In 1850, he purchased 2,000 acres (8.1 km^{2}) in the area of the Los Gatos Creek and proceeded to build a mill. In 1853, he raised the money for the construction, borrowing $130,000 from two lenders (including one who charged an interest rate of 3% per month), and in 1854, the mill was built. However, the milling machinery had to be shipped from New York around Cape Horn. Once it arrived, Forbes had trouble installing it, but eventually, the mill started grinding flour on December 1, 1855.

The opening of Forbes Mill was an auspicious moment in the history of the Santa Clara Valley. Built on the site of a Mexican ranch, the mill represented the shift of land ownership from the Californio Dons to the new settlers arriving after the Mexican–American War. The first three stories of the mill were built of stone quarried from the Los Gatos Canyon. The top story was wood, cut from trees in the mountains above Los Gatos. In 1880, an annex was attached to the north wall of the mill building. The town that grew around this building was first called Forbes Mill, then Forbestown, and finally Los Gatos.

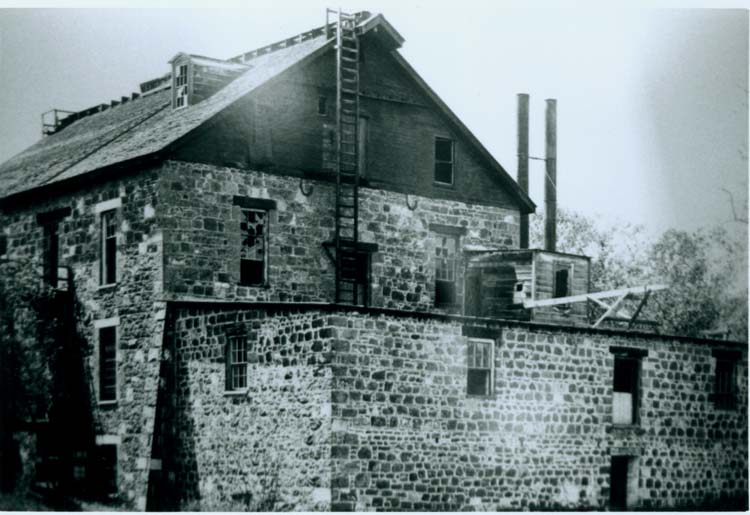
Forbes Mill ca. 1900

Unfortunately, Forbes knew nothing about flour milling. He had built a dam 0.5 miles (0.8 km) upstream on the creek, carrying water via a flume to two 20-foot (6.1 m) high water wheels. However, a 20-foot (6.1 m) high water drop proved to be inefficient, so he had to keep raising the water level. Not only that, but there was also only enough water in the creek to power the mill during the winter months, meaning that the machinery sat idle for much of the year. Furthermore, by the time the mill was in operation, competing mills had been constructed, and the Gold Rush was coming to an end, thus driving flour prices down to a mere $5/barrel.

Besides his outstanding loans, Forbes had also lost a lot of money speculating on wheat and flour and was forced into bankruptcy. He eventually defaulted on his loans, and the mill and land were sold in 1857 to Gustave Touchard, one of his creditors. Forbes continued to operate the mill for Touchard but ultimately was evicted from the property in 1858. Touchard hired others to run the mill, but they did not have much success with it either, although he was able to sell parcels of the land for a small profit.

In 1866, he sold the mill to William H. Rogers, who had previously worked at a flour mill in Detroit and had opened his own Mountain Flourmills (one of Santa Rosa's competitors) in Placerville. He had sold his interest in his company in 1860 and served as postmaster of Placerville and sheriff of El Dorado County until his purchase of now-named "Clifton Mill". His first act was to raise the waterhead to 65 feet (19.8 m), replace the water wheels with turbine wheels, and upgrade the machinery. With his experience, Rogers was able to turn the mill into a profitable operation.

In 1869, he brought in partners WS McMurtry and JW McMillen and renamed the company as the Los Gatos Manufacturing Co. The waterhead was increased to 200 feet (61.0 m), and the company constructed reservoirs to hold enough water to allow for year-round production. With these improvements, the mill was able to produce 100 barrels of flour a day. In 1881, the Los Gatos News wrote, "While other cities and towns may boast of a larger population, for the manufacture of the finest grade of flour known to the markets of the civilized world, Los Gatos Flouring Mills stands preeminent."

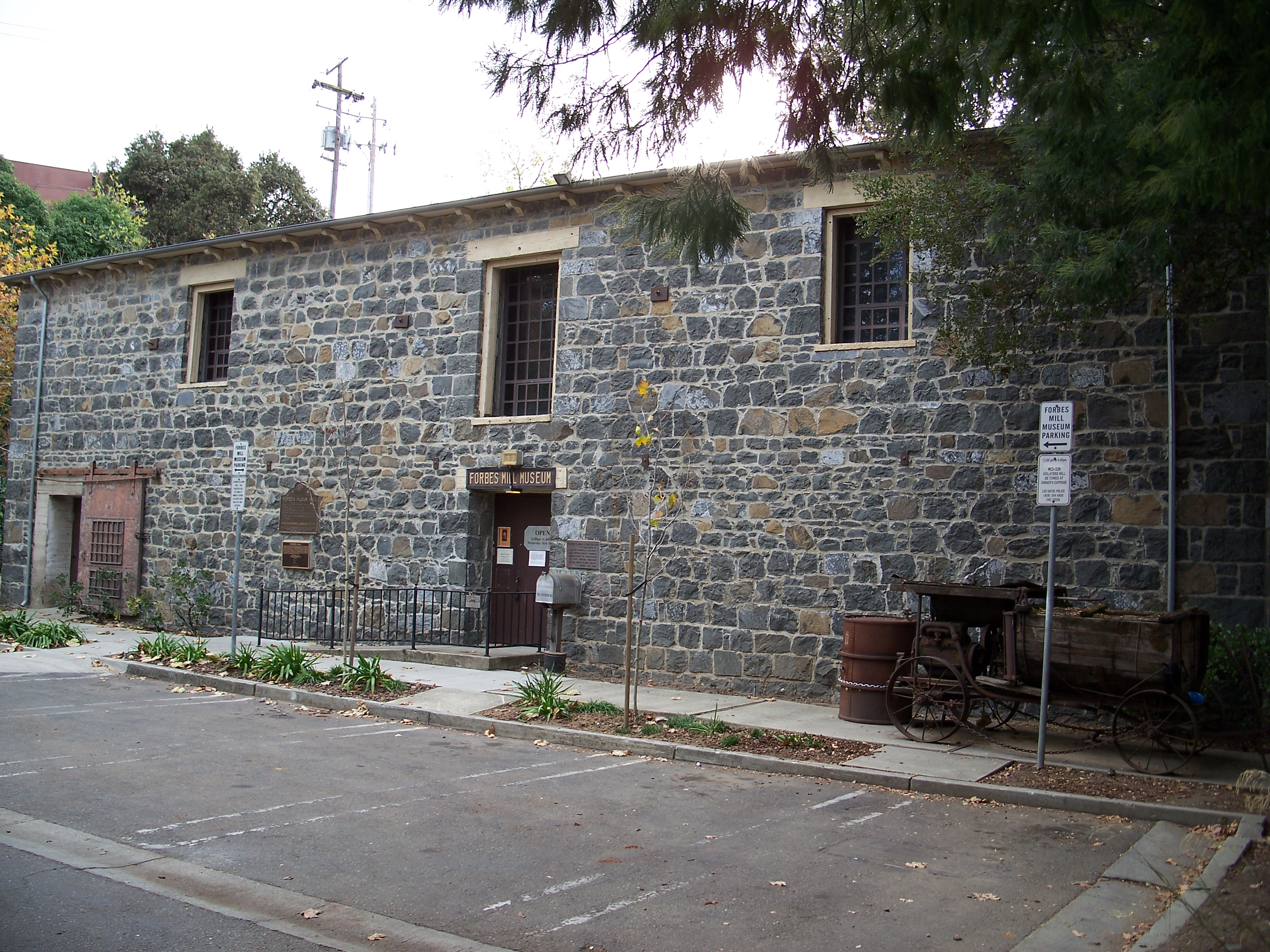

It continued as a flour mill until 1887 when it successively became a power plant for the Los Gatos Ice and Power Company, a brewing and bottling company, the Los Gatos Gas Company, and finally the PG&E substation for Los Gatos. The original "Santa Rosa" Flour Mill building was torn down in 1916. The mill remained a storehouse for PG&E until after World War II. It was then abandoned and finally, in 1971, it was revived as a youth center for Los Gatos with live rock music on Friday and Saturday nights.

On June 10, 1950, the California Centennial Commission commemorated the mill's contribution to the State's rich past by designating it as California Historical Landmark number 458. It is also listed on the National Register of Historic Places.
