= Wrights, California =

- Ghost town
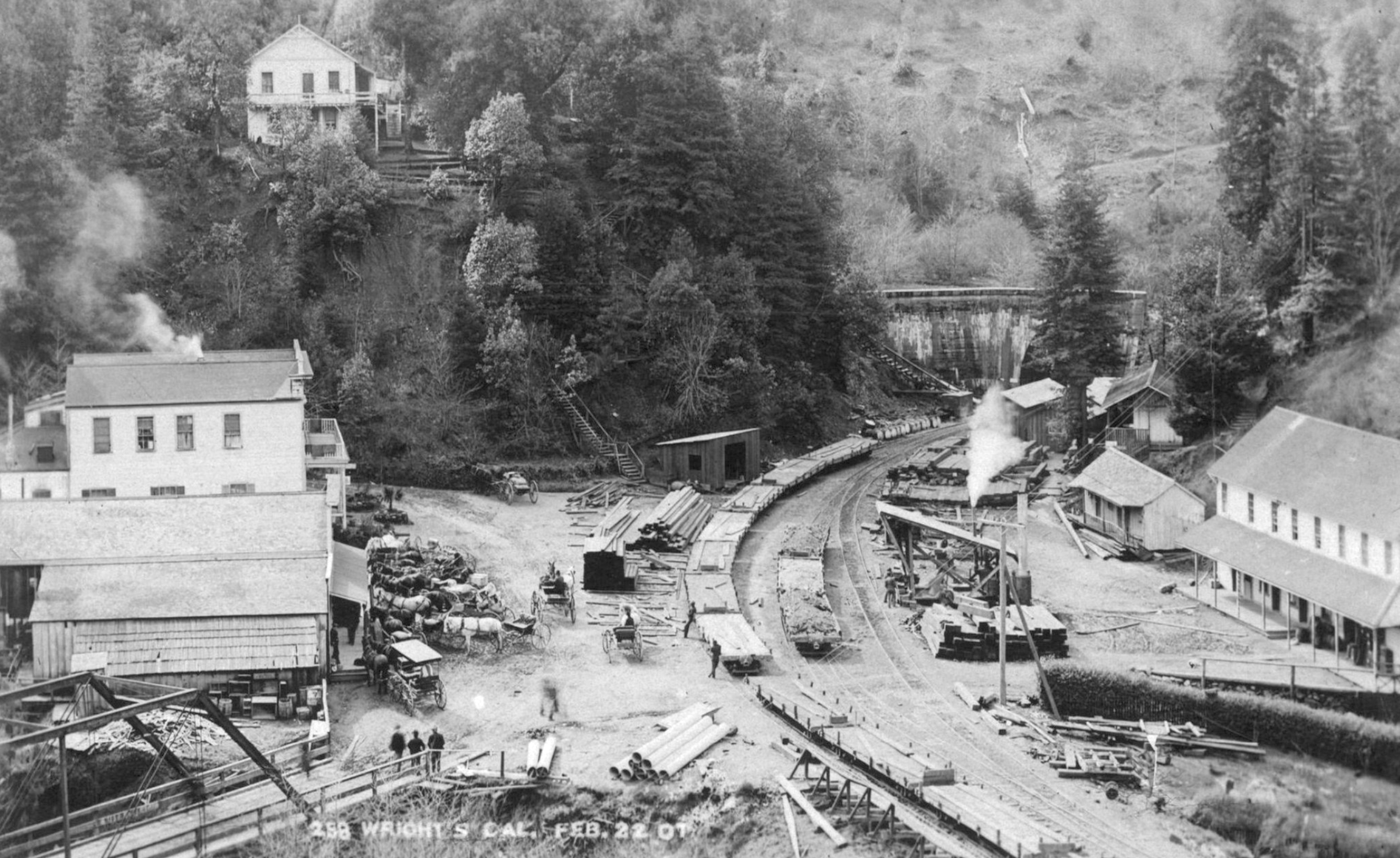
- Wrights, California c. 1901

- Location within Northern California Location within the state of California
- Coordinates: 37°08′21″N 121°56′49″W
- Country: United States
- State: California
- County: Santa Clara
- Elevation: 991 ft (302 m)
- Time zone: UTC-8 (Pacific (PST))
  - Summer (DST): UTC-7 (PDT)
- GNIS feature ID: 238202

Wrights, California (also known as Wrights Station) is a ghost town in unincorporated west Santa Clara County, California, United States. It is located at the north portal of Wrights Tunnel near Summit Road in the Santa Cruz Mountains, on the north bank of Los Gatos Creek, east of State Route 17.

The National Weather Service maintained a cooperative weather station on the site of Wrights until May 31, 1986, which recorded rainfall and snowfall. The weather station was 1,600 feet (490 m) above sea level. The location is on the San Andreas Fault, according to the U.S. Geological Survey, and it experienced considerable damage in the 1906 San Francisco earthquake. Geologists observed a lateral displacement of 4.6 feet (1.4 m) at Wrights.

Wrights is one of a number of ghost towns in the Santa Cruz Mountains that flourished during the last half of the nineteenth century. Laurel, Wrights, Glenwood, and Clems declined when the Los Gatos-Santa Cruz railroad ceased operations in March 1940. Later in 1940, Patchen was bypassed and isolated by the construction of State Route 17; since the late 1960s it has been a Christmas tree ranch. Alma and Lexington were submerged in Lexington Reservoir in 1952, along State Route 17 above Los Gatos.

== History ==
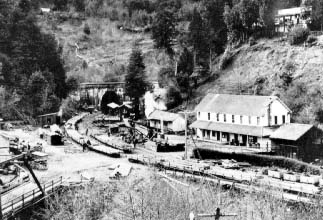
Wrights Station, 1907. Wrights Tunnel in background. Same bridge as below.

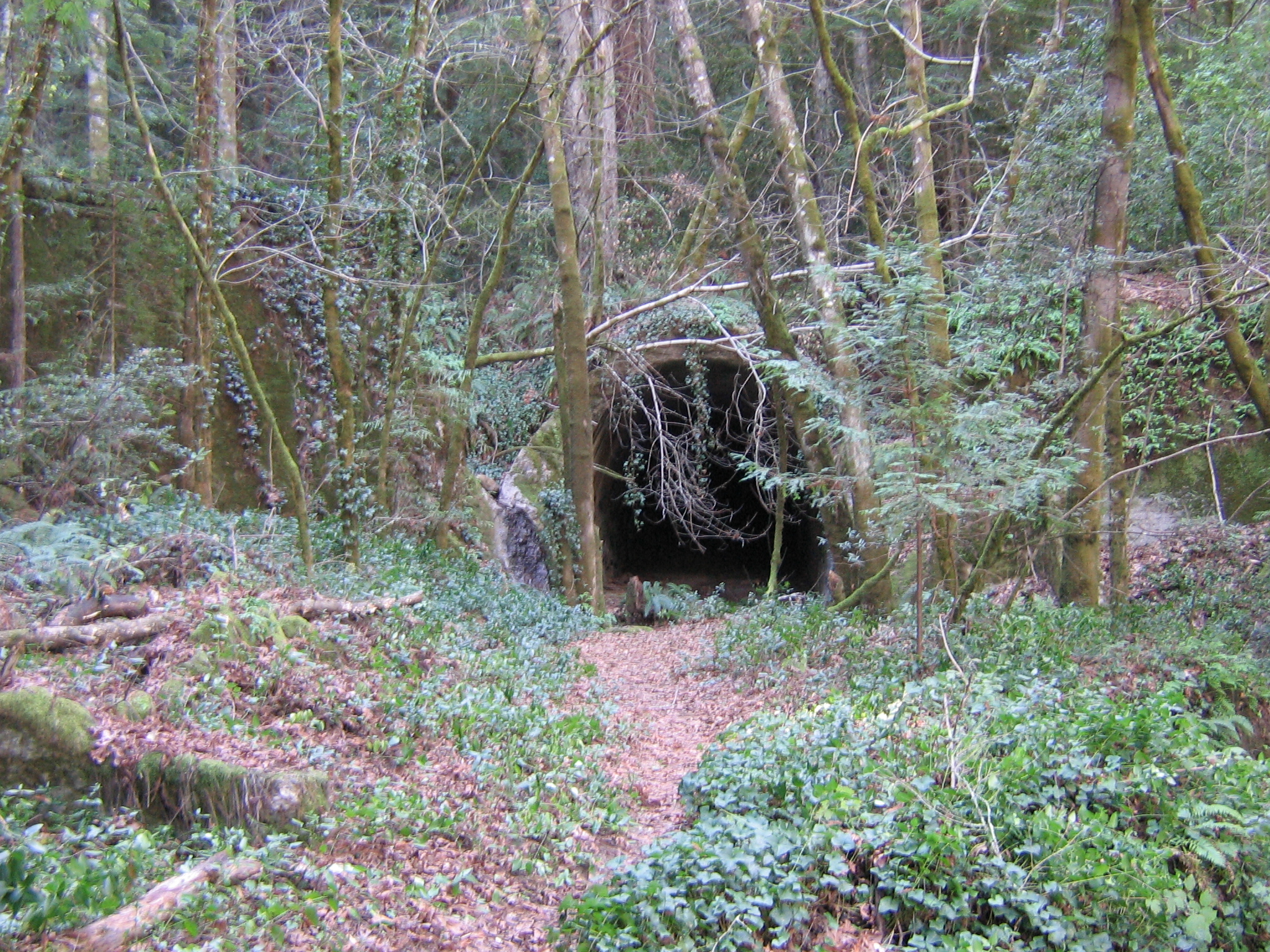
RR Tunnel Entrance Ruin, Wrights Station, Jan 2009

In the 1870s a toll road was built over the mountains from Los Gatos to Santa Cruz that was utilized by stagecoaches. Then, a narrow gauge railroad from Alameda was constructed along the same route, beginning in 1877, by San Francisco capitalists James Fair and Alfred E. Davis, who headed the South Pacific Coast Railroad (SPCRR). One of the stops along the line, just below the summit of the Santa Cruz Mountains, was adjacent to the property of James Richards Wright, who had a residence/hotel known as Arbor Villa in Burrell near the summit, and he maintained commercial orchards of fruit trees and grapes. The small community that sprouted around this stop on the railroad became known as Wright's Station, or simply Wrights. The Rev. Wright was the patriarch of a large family that had moved to California from Ohio and the younger brother of the well-known abolitionist Elizur Wright. One of his sons, Frank Vincent Wright, later married Susie Davis, the daughter of SPCRR president Alfred Davis, and another son, Sumner Banks Wright, moved to southern California and established a town in the San Bernardino mountains known as Wrightwood, today a ski resort.

A post office was established at Wrights in 1879, and the railroad was completed in 1880 from Los Gatos, along the Los Gatos Creek, to Wrights Station, about a mile east of Patchen. During the construction of Wrights Tunnel (between Wrights and Laurel), a strong flow of natural gas was encountered, and an explosion followed, which resulted in the death of thirty-two Chinese workers. The main leak was subsequently stopped, but gas continued to escape in small quantities. The extent of the supply was unknown. U.S. Geological Survey maps from 1919 show the railroad running from Los Gatos to Santa Cruz, with stops in Alma, Wrights, Laurel, Glenwood, Clems, Zayante, Eccles, Felton, and Scotts Valley. There were a series of tunnels, including a 6,200-foot (1,900 m) tunnel between Wright and Laurel, most of which were later blocked when the railroad ceased operations. Wrights itself had a benchmark elevation of 896 feet (273 m).

Wrights Station was an important shipping point for extensive fruit growing areas in the Santa Cruz mountains. By the 1890s, there were about 3,200 acres (13 km^{2}) under cultivation. The soil consists largely of disintegrated sandstone and clay, and has the appearance, particularly on the hilltops, of the "white ash" soil of the Fresno raisin district.

Vineyards were planted, providing grapes for commercial wine producers, such as Almaden Vineyards and Paul Masson. There was a thriving timber industry, too, utilizing the redwoods of the Santa Cruz Mountains. All utilized the railroad. Wrights Station was one of the small settlements that grew up along the railroad.

Alice Matty and her father, Antone, came to Wrights in 1880 from San Francisco. Her father was originally from the Maritime Alps region of France. Antone Matty worked in the general store for eight years. An overheated stove in the town's hotel started a fire in 1885 that leveled the entire settlement. While Wrights was being rebuilt, Antone ran the store from a boxcar parked on the railroad siding.

In 1887, journalist Josephine McCracken visited Wrights (as it was commonly called), reporting the community had "a depot, hotel, store, post office, blacksmith shop, besides a number of decidedly ugly and disgraceful-looking Chinese stores and wash houses. Fir-crowned mountains frowned down upon it, and the hideous black mouth of the great tunnel close by is always wide open, with the evident and determined intention of swallowing up the train – engine, cars, and all – as it approached from the San Francisco side."

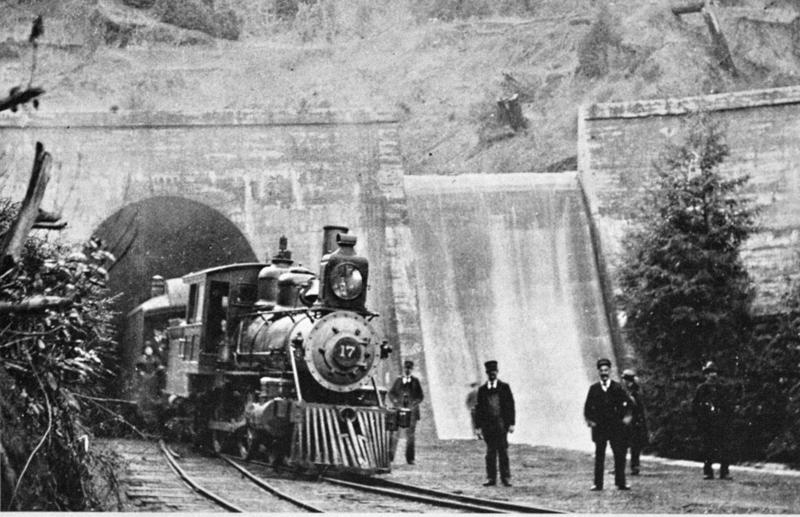
A steam locomotive exiting the Summit Tunnel portal in 1895 in Wrights

By 1888, Antone Matty had saved enough money to buy the store, and by 1896 he owned the town. Since the Matty family had six children, Matty helped to organize a school district, and soon the town had a school. The Wright School was a shingle-walled building with a belfry, and was in operation until 1928. Highlands School was built to replace The Wrights School in 1929. Highlands school was attended by the Children of Wrights Agricultural Farmers. Farmers such as William Elza Lawrence, a turkey farmer and father of 8 children. Elza's children Eluyn (Elvyn) Lawrence, J P Lawrence, Joe Lawrence, Flossie Lawrence and Bessie Lawrence attended Highlands School. Elza's youngest daughter Marie Dell Lawrence was born in Wrights on September 14, 1934. Elza's 9th child was also born in Wright but died shortly after birth and was laid to rest at the Santa Cruz County Graveyard.

The Highlands School was closed after only 10 years of operation. The population dropped steeply in Wrights due to the routing of State Route 17 away from Wrights and instead through Los Gatos to Santa Cruz. Antone Matty became a member of the Santa Clara Valley Pioneer Association, and later joined the Sempervirens Club, a conservation organization devoted to saving the redwoods.

Southern Pacific Railroad bought the narrow gauge SPCRR railroad and decided to take advantage of a craze for picnic excursion trains. They opened a short spur line along the creek at Wrights. They named the area "Sunset Park", and began hauling trainloads of passengers into the Santa Cruz mountains. Unfortunately, according to contemporary reports, the visitors gathered armloads of ferns and wildflowers, left a trail of discarded litter strewn along the railroad right-of-way, and kicked out the passenger car windows on the return trip. The 1906 earthquake ended the excursion trains and Sunset Park.

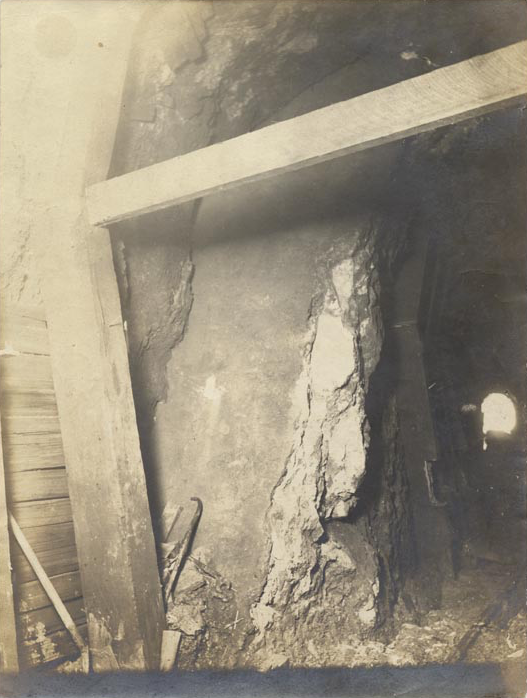
Damage caused to the Summit Tunnel by the 1906 San Francisco Earthquake, with the north tunnel portal and Wrights just outside of that portal

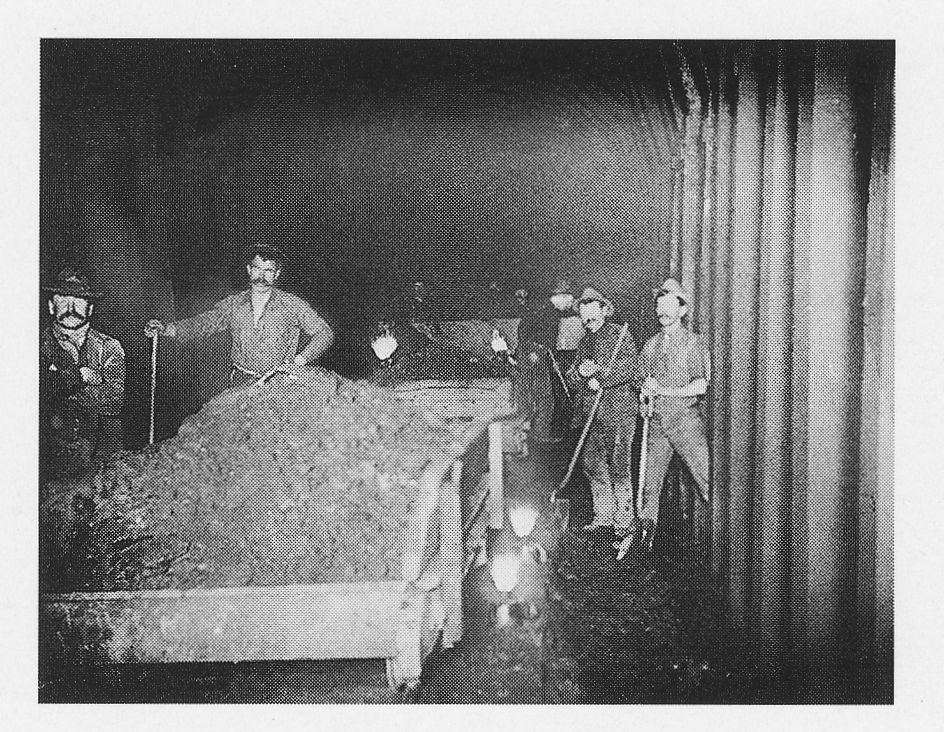
Crew repairing the tunnel after the earthquake and widening the tunnel to allow the tracks to be regauged from narrow gauge to standard gauge

Besides the numerous farms in the region, a number of homes were constructed, many of which were destroyed in the April 18, 1906, earthquake. A fissure opened under the house at the Morrell Ranch, throwing the structure from its foundation and splitting it in two. The quake also destroyed a number of bridges, damaged the tunnels, and twisted the rails, as Robert Iacopi and William Bronson recounted in their published accounts. Another large fissure opened in the dirt road near the blacksmith shop. About 400 feet from the eastern end of the 6,200 feet (1.9 km) railroad tunnel (between Wrights and Laurel), a 5-foot (150 cm) offset occurred, badly damaging the tunnel. Fences were also split.

Alice Matty, her sisters Teresa and Anna, and her three brothers grew up at Wrights. When the station agent, Mr. Hunter, was replaced in the 1900s, Alice was appointed to take over his position, becoming the first woman station agent hired by Southern Pacific in California. Bruce MacGregor described the job: "The Wrights station agent inked in waybills for loadings of hay, beans, prunes and figs, cargo that would fill two or three boxcars a day. The lumber freighting eclipsed all other cargoes combined." There was a daily freight train from Alameda. Several local freights and mixed trains (passengers and freight) passed through Wrights every day on their way to Santa Cruz or San Jose.

Besides preparing waybills, Alice Matty was the telegrapher and the ticket agent. She handled the manual signal levers that threw the switches when trains needed to be taken off the main line and placed on sidings. Located in the bottom of a canyon, Wrights had its share of flash floods, rock slides, and forest fires. Alice frequently had to telegraph for a repair crew to clear rocks from the track, or shore up a sagging roadbed after a heavy storm. Increasing rail traffic resulted in an increase in the number of accidents.

Alice Matty never married; she stayed at Wrights with her father, who lived until 1922. In later years she worked at the Bank of America in Los Gatos, when it was located at the corner of Main Street and Santa Cruz Avenue.

The railroad was rebuilt after the earthquake, only to cease operations in 1940 following a landslide caused by heavy rains in February of that year. This disaster further contributed to the decline of Wrights (the post office had already closed two years before). With both the post office and school closing in 1938 and frequently no road access due to landslides(closing both roads and rails), farmers such as William Elza Lawrence could not sell their goods. Many of these farmers left Wrights without being able to sell their farms. The routing of State Route 17 away from Wrights in 1940 completed the village's demise. Also in 1940, Arbor Villa, the Wright family home, which was still occupied by Clara Wright, the youngest daughter of James Richards Wright, burned to the ground and was never rebuilt.

== Legacy ==
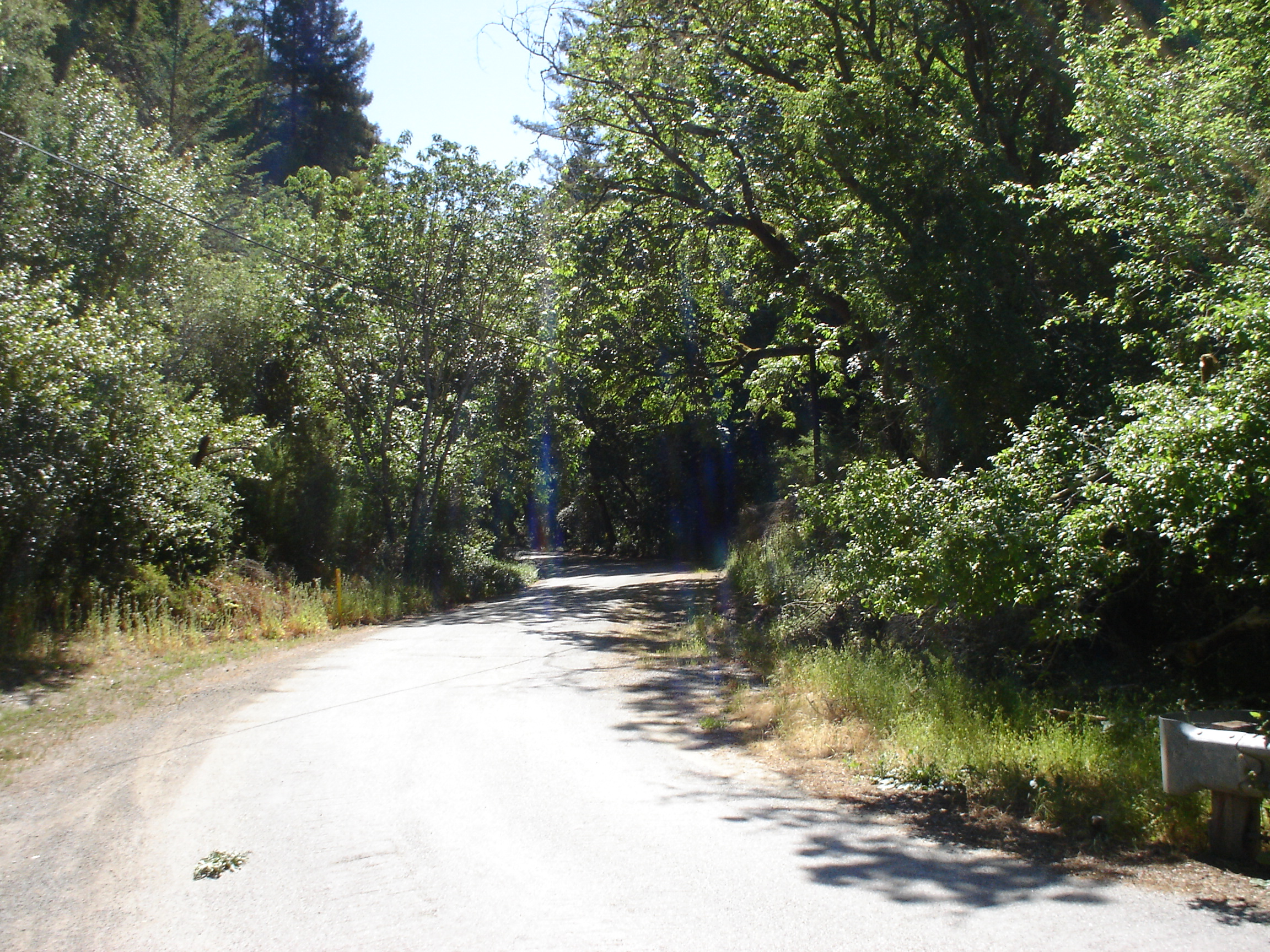
Site of Wrights, May 2008. Some foundations can be seen in the woods, but little remains of the town.

Wrights has so completely disappeared that today no trace remains, except the ruins of the old tunnel. Some building foundations and debris from the town can still be found in the dense woods. Satellite and ground photographs show thick overgrowth and forest on the site. The surrounding area is now only sparsely settled. The name of the community lives on in "Wrights Station Road", which runs through the redwood forest from Morrill Road to Cathermola Road (also known as Metcalf Road on some maps), north of Summit Road. Wrights Station Road crosses Los Gatos Creek on an historic bridge with iron railings (possibly dating from the 1920s), ending at the site of the town. Lake Elsman, a reservoir, is near the site of Wrights. Several miles of the original Los Gatos – Santa Cruz narrow gauge railroad have been preserved in Santa Cruz County and trains operate year-round as a tourist attraction known as the Santa Cruz, Big Trees and Pacific Railway.

== Weather station ==
The National Weather Service cooperative station, which operated on the site of Wrights until 1986, primarily recorded rainfall and snowfall. Based on those observations, Wrights had an average annual rainfall of 46.09 inches (117.1 cm) and an average annual snowfall of 1.2 inches (3.0 cm). The maximum annual rainfall was 87.65 inches (222.6 cm) in 1983 and the minimum was 17.88 inches (45.4 cm) in 1976. The greatest 24-hour rainfall was 13.79 inches (35.0 cm) on October 12, 1962, during the famous Columbus Day storm that affected much of northern California, Oregon, and Washington. The maximum annual snowfall was 10.6 inches (27 cm) in 1974. Some temperature records for Wrights exist, showing a record high of 102 °F on August 5, 1978.
