= Patchen, California =

Patchen
- Ghost town
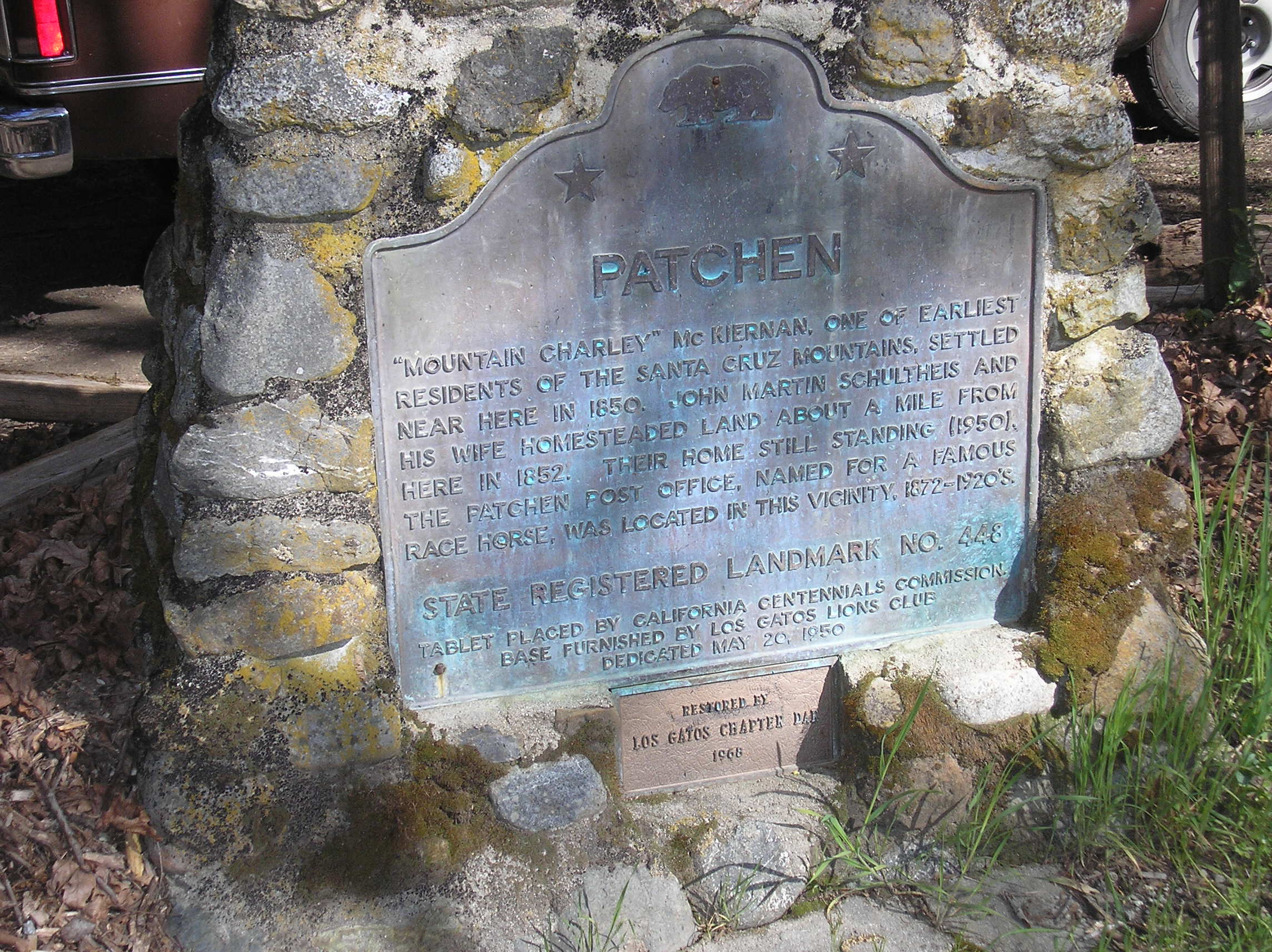
- California Historic Marker 448, for Patchen, California.
- Interactive map of Patchen
- Coordinates: 37°08′54″N 121°58′28″W
- Country: United States
- State: California
- County: Santa Clara

California Historical Landmark
- Reference no.: 448

Patchen is a ghost town in the Santa Cruz Mountains, in Santa Clara County, California, United States. It is located along the old Santa Cruz Highway.

== History ==
The earliest known permanent european settler in what became Patchen was Charles Henry "Mountain Charley" McKiernan. In the 1850s and 1860s, McKiernan built roads throughout his property on the summit of the mountains and operated a toll road on Native American trail nearby. In 1850, McKiernan settled near a lagoon about one mile south of his previous residence. On May 8, 1854, when hunting with John Taylor, McKiernan was attacked by a grizzly bear. Unable to reload his rifle, McKiernan bludgeoned the bear with his rifle until the weapon broke. In the attack, however, McKiernan's skull was injured, and he sustained damage to his left eye and forehead. Three San Jose doctors crafted a silver plate from two Mexican pesos and patched the wound, and did so without the use of anesthetics. McKiernan died on January 16, 1892. His legacy is commemorated on California Historical Landmark #448.

The origins of the name Patchen may go back to ancient times in what is now Patching Parish in Sussex, England. People by the name Patching, Patchen, and Patchin have been listed in that area since the 800 A.D. In 1634, Joseph Patching came to the U.S. and most of the Patchens in America can be traced to him. The name reached the San Francisco Bay Area by way of a famous racehorse named George M. Patchen and his son, Smith Patchen, nicknamed California Patchen, because of his good showing in California in 1862 and 1867 in San Jose, San Francisco, and Sacramento.

The post office name appears on government records as having been established at Patchen on March 28, 1872, and continued to operate until November 30, 1929. One of the first postmasters was D.C. Feely; in 1885, he represented Patchen at the American Exposition at New Orleans. Feely took a polished wood collection, a soil sample from his farm, and a large exhibit of fresh fruit provided by the local fruit growers.

The Edgemont Hotel was located in Patchen and operated by Mr. and Mrs. L.N. Scott. Today, it is a parking lot for the Christmas Tree Farm.

In 1855, the California Stage Company was awarded the United States mail contract from San Jose to Santa Cruz and Patchen became the place to change horses. One of the most famous drivers on the mountain route was Charley Parkhurst, who drove over the mountain roads around 1868. Like other stage drivers, Parkhurst wore a heavy muffler, gloves, a buffalo skin coat and cap. Also, like other drivers, Parkhurst had a sharp throaty whistle, used like a horn to warn others that the stage was just around the corner. For these reasons, Charley was able to hide her identity until her death.

The stage was robbed at Patchen on the afternoon of April 1, 1874. After another robbery in the same area on April 28, 1874, the culprits were captured and sent off to the state prison at San Quentin with the help of "Mountain Charley" and the local posse.

From the 1880s to the early 1900s vacationers, going into the mountains to places such as the Edgemont Hotel in Patchen or to Santa Cruz, filled the roads with horses and wagons.

The narrow gauge South Pacific Coast Railroad railroad opened in 1880 from Los Gatos, along the Los Gatos Creek, to Wright's Station about a mile east of Patchen. From Wright's Station, it went through a two-mile-long tunnel to Laurel, then through other tunnels to Scotts Valley and Santa Cruz. The Southern Pacific bought the railroad around 1900.

At 5:12 a.m. on April 18, 1906, the most disastrous earthquake in California history shook the area. Roads were blocked by landslides, bridges were broken, houses and hotels were shaken to the ground, and the railroad was destroyed. Shifts in the nearby San Andreas Fault caused significant offsets and fissures, especially in Wrights. The railroad was rebuilt and continued to operate until early 1940, when severe storms blocked the route. Southern Pacific considered rebuilding the railroad again, then decided to abandon it. The same year State Route 17 was completed and bypassed Patchen, contributing to its decline.

In 1949, one of the three buildings which remained from the original town of Patchen was torn down by Paul von Ahnen, who used its hand-hewn timbers to build his house, across the road from the present Christmas tree farm. The building had been the old stage station, built in the 1870s.

On December 29, 1957, a fire destroyed the building which had been erected by Joseph Fowler in 1876 as the post office. Fowler had kept the office in his home for the four years prior to that time. The chimney of the old post office stood until 5:04 p.m. on October 17, 1989, when the Loma Prieta earthquake brought it crashing to the ground after more than one hundred years.

The barn, the last remaining building, was disassembled and reassembled on a new foundation in 1985 and is in the process of restoration by the current owner.

The huge concrete reservoir located on the property was fed by springs and used as the water supply for the town.

The land where the town once stood was purchased, piece by piece, during the late 1960s and early 1970s by the current owner and converted to a Christmas tree farm to preserve it from development.

== Patchen Christmas Tree Farm ==
The Christmas tree farm on the site of Patchen is one of the few farms that produces Monterey pines. It also grows Sierra redwoods and the Douglas firs. The farm preserves relics from Patchen's heyday, including the water supply reservoir, a historical landmark plaque, and remnants of a bar and hotel.

Owner Jim Beck started buying little pieces of land in the 1960s. He told the Saratoga News that his "original motivation was because there was a lot of explosive growth in the mountains, and I didn't want to see all that development going on around me. I considered growing wine grapes or kiwis, but I decided on Christmas trees. This is like an overgrown hobby for me."

A frequent danger in the Santa Cruz Mountains is forest fires. In the mid-1980s, a forest fire came so close to the farm that the trees were threatened. Beck rewarded the firefighters who put the fire out with free Christmas trees for life.

== Patchen Pass ==
Nearby the town's site is Patchen Pass, the highest point on Highway 17, with an elevation of 1,814 feet (553 m) above sea level. This pass is sometimes covered for hours or even days with snow. The pass is located at latitude 37°08'39"N, longitude 121°59'05"W; decimal degrees: latitude 37.14411, longitude -121.98468.
