= Clems, California =

Ghost town in Santa Cruz County, California

Coordinates: 37°05′53″N 121°59′47″W

Clems is a ghost town in Santa Cruz County, California, United States at an elevation of 790 feet (240 meters). It is located at latitude 37055N, longitude 1215947W; decimal degrees: latitude 37.09806, longitude -121.99639.

Clems was a minor stop located between Glenwood and Zayante on the railroad which operated from Los Gatos to Santa Cruz from 1880 to 1940. The railroad was leased in 1887 to the Southern Pacific, which added weekend excursion trains to the regular South Pacific Coast Railroad freight and mixed (freight and passenger) trains that operated several times a day. The tracks, bridges, and tunnels along the line were badly damaged in the April 18, 1906, earthquake, then repaired or rebuilt. The line was standard-gauged in 1907 and a railroad shelter was installed for locals at the time. Southern Pacific formally abandoned the line in November 1940 following a major storm that severely damaged the line on the night of February 26. State Route 17 was completed that same year, bypassing Clems and most of the other stops along the old railroad right-of-way.

Today the area is sparsely settled and is considered a part of the Glenwood community.

== Bibliography ==
- Derek R. Whaley (2015). Santa Cruz Trains: Railroads of the Santa Cruz Mountains. Santa Cruz, CA. ISBN 978-1508570738.
