= South Pacific Coast Railroad =

Railway line in California, US

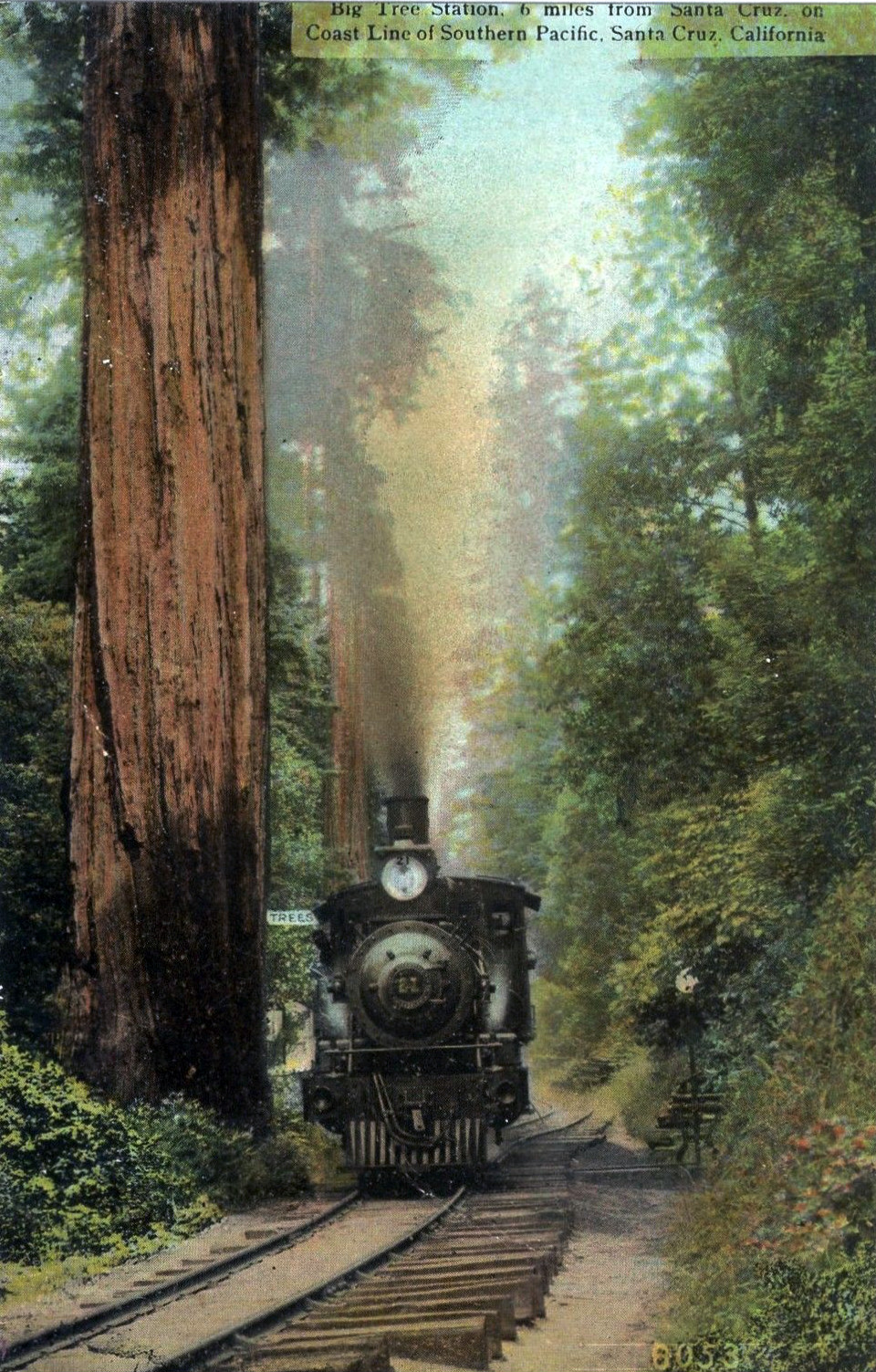
- Postcard photo of the Southern Pacific Big Tree station and locomotive #21, c. 1910s

Overview
- Headquarters: Newark, California
- Reporting mark: SPC
- Locale: California's San Francisco Bay Area
- Dates of operation: March 29, 1876–July 1, 1887 (independent company); June 4, 1940 (Los Gatos - Olympia); present (Los Gatos - San Leandro Bay)
- Successors: South Pacific Coast Railway; Southern Pacific Transportation Company

Technical
- Track gauge: 4 ft 8 1/2 in (1,435 mm) standard gauge after 1909
- Previous gauge: 3 ft (914 mm)
- Length: 77.5 miles (124.7 km)
Route map
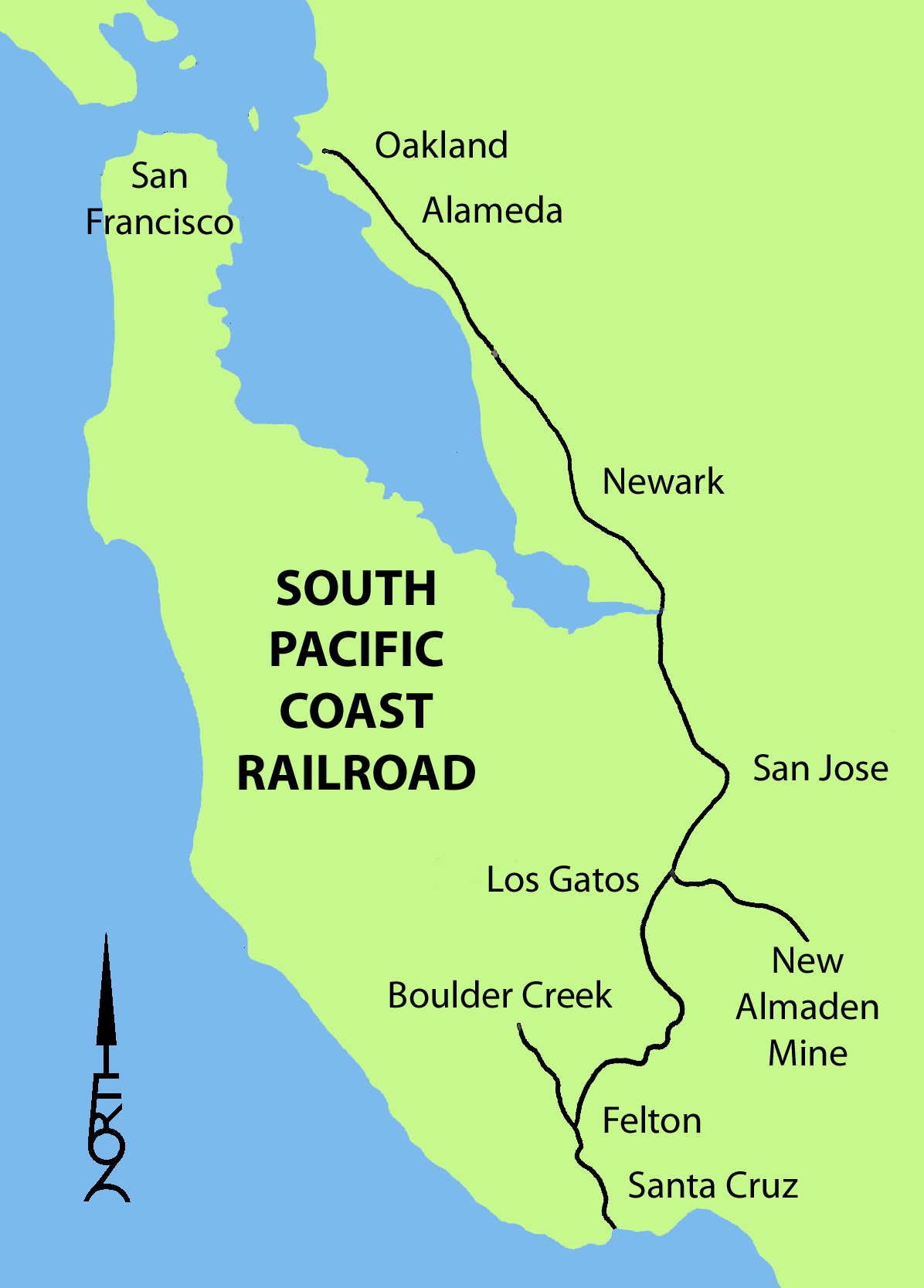

The South Pacific Coast Railroad (SPC) was a 3 ft (914 mm) narrow gauge steam railroad running between Santa Cruz, California, and Alameda, with a ferry connection in Alameda to San Francisco. The railroad was created as the Santa Clara Valley Railroad (SVCRR), founded by local strawberry growers as a way to get their crops to market in San Francisco and provide an alternative to the Southern Pacific Railroad. In 1876, Alfred E. Davis a Comstock Lode silver magnate, bought the line and was later acquired by the Southern Pacific and converted to 4 ft 8 1/2 in (1,435 mm) standard gauge. and extended it into the Santa Cruz Mountains to capture the significant lumber traffic coming out of the redwood forests. The narrow-gauge line was originally laid with 52-pound-per-yard (26 kg/m) rail on 8-foot (2.44 m) redwood ties; and was later acquired by the Southern Pacific and converted to 4 ft 8 1/2 in (1,435 mm) standard gauge.

== History ==
=== Origins ===
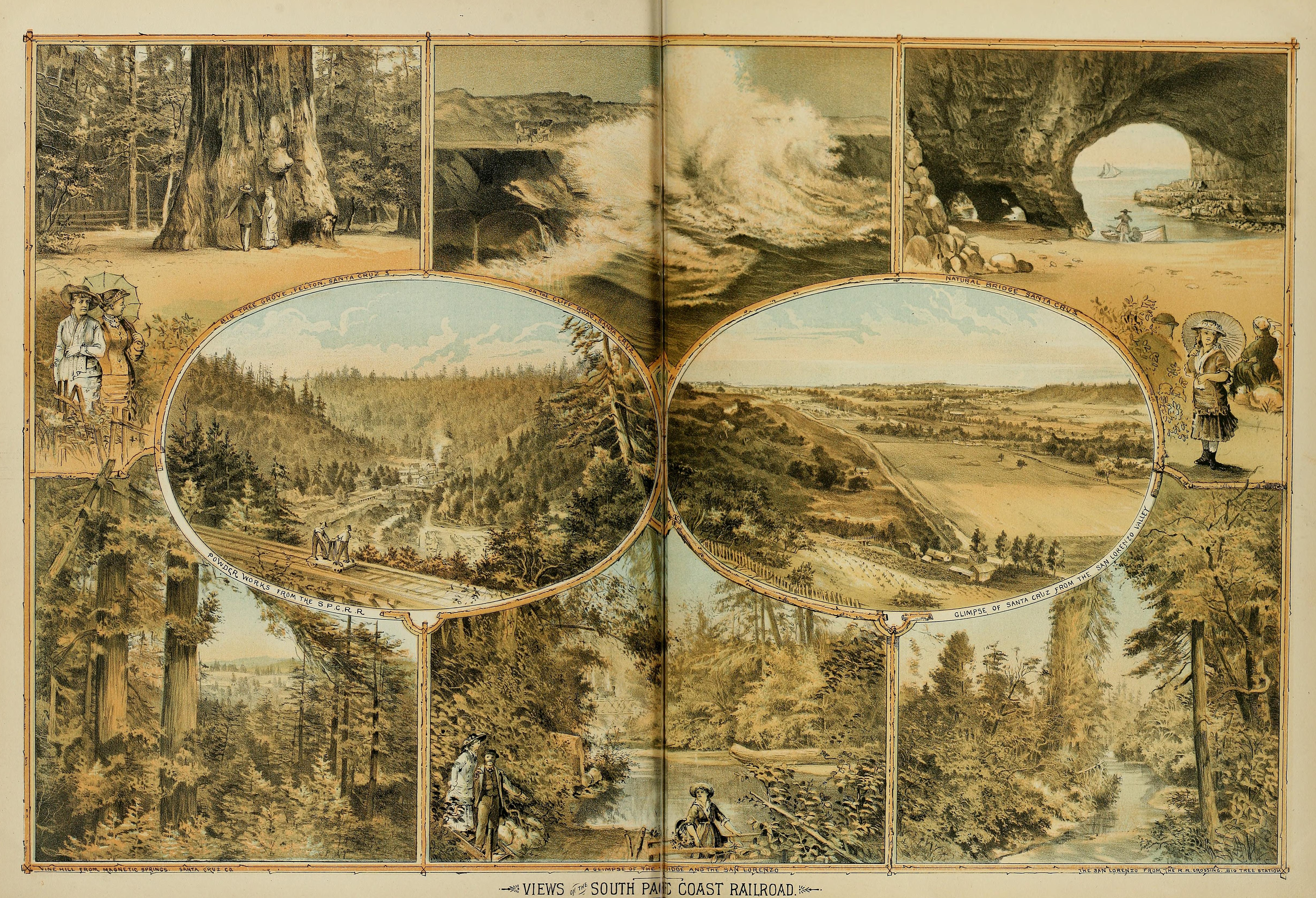
"Views on the South Pacific Coast Railroad" featuring locations in Santa Cruz County (1882)

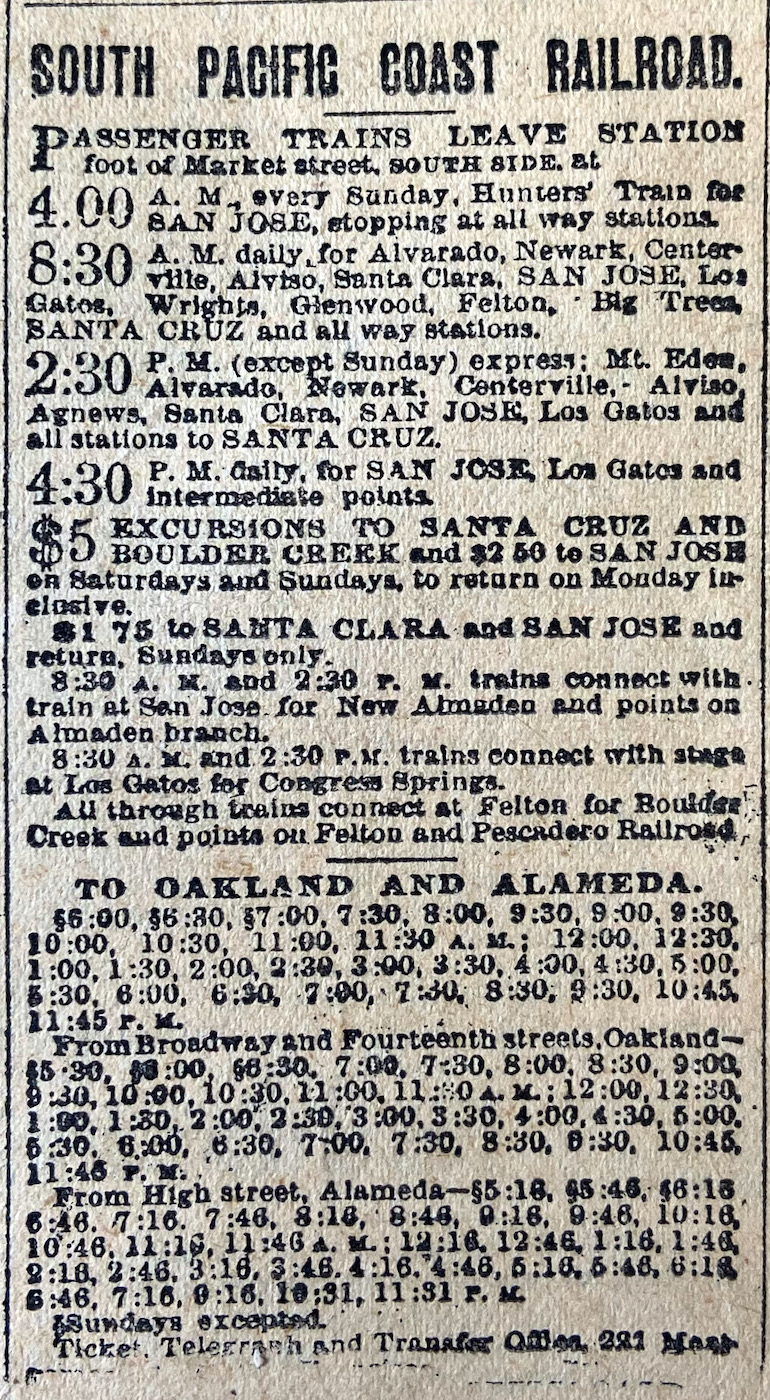
Schedule and fares for March 4, 1887

In 1875 the SCVRR was nearing bankruptcy and was acquired by A. E. Davis. The South Pacific Coast Railroad (SPC) was then incorporated in 1876 the finish the Santa Clara Valley Company railroad and extend it from Dumbarton Point to Santa Cruz, Saratoga, and the mercury mines of New Almaden. Dumbarton Point was a deep-water landing that could be used to transfer the agricultural produce from the Santa Clara Valley for transport to San Francisco.

Railway shops were built in Newark and a 3 ft (914 mm) narrow gauge line to San Jose was completed in 1876. The SPC ferry Newark offered connecting service from Newark to San Francisco in 1877. In 1878 the SPC was extended from San Jose to Los Gatos; and the subsidiary Bay and Coast Railroad completed a line of trestles and fill along the eastern edge of San Francisco Bay from Newark to Alameda. The ferry connection to San Francisco shifted to Alameda as SPC ferrys Bay City and Garden City increased the frequency and reliability of connecting service.

In 1878 Comstock mine owners James G. Fair and James C. Flood were brought as equal partners to capitalize building across the Santa Cruz Mountains. By 1885 Fair would gain control of the SPC.

Two years and eight tunnels were required to extend the SPC through the Santa Cruz Mountains from Los Gatos to California's third busiest seaport at Santa Cruz in 1880. SPC leased the San Lorenzo Flume and Transportation Company to acquire their subsidiary Santa Cruz and Felton Railroad as a route through the city to Santa Cruz municipal pier. The big lumber transport flume was replaced by a 7 miles (11 km) logging branch in 1883. In 1886 another branch line was built to the New Almaden mercury mine; and the SPC main line was extended from Alameda to Oakland. Additional horsedrawn branch lines served Centerville (now Fremont) and Agnews State Hospital. Commuter trains fed the San Francisco ferries from east bay communities, two daily trains served Santa Cruz, and four daily locals served the logging branch to Boulder Creek. Excursion trains ran from the ferries to resorts of the south bay and Santa Cruz Mountains. Freight trains carried redwood lumber, mercury, sacked lime, gunpowder from the California Powder Works, and local agricultural produce.

Building the South Pacific Coast Railroad dramatically reduced the cost of transportation for both passengers and freight. In 1857, the stagecoach from San Francisco to Santa Cruz took two full days, and the fare was $13 (one way) plus the cost of lodging and meals. After the completion of the railroad, the travel time dropped to a few hours, and cost only $6 (round trip). Freight rates dropped to only half of what they had been previously. As a result, farming and all other forms of economic activity in the region increased significantly.

=== Southern Pacific control ===
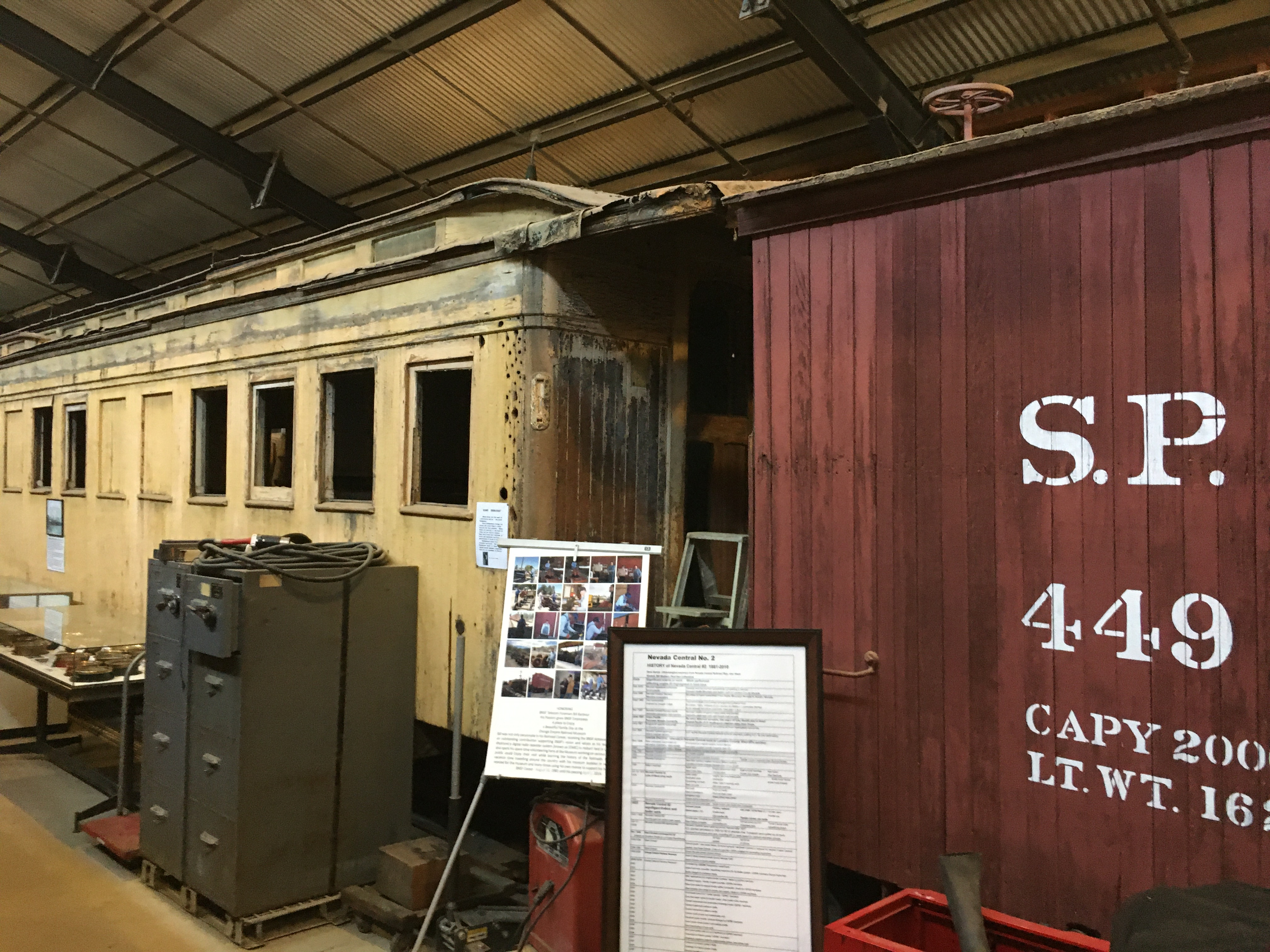
Southern Pacific narrow-gauge coach #39, at the Southern California Railway Museum. It was built by Carter Brothers in 1881 at their Newark shop for the South Pacific Coast Railroad. The museum also has South Pacific Coast flat car #253, which was later converted into Southern Pacific gondola #216.

By 1887 SPC was a major California transportation concern; and Southern Pacific paid six million dollars to merge it into their California transportation system (equivalent to $215 million in 2025). An 1893 winter storm caused a landslide in the Santa Cruz Mountains requiring major reconstruction to restore service. The Alameda ferry terminal burned in 1902 and was replaced with the modern terminal which survived until ferry service was discontinued by the San Francisco–Oakland Bay Bridge in 1939. The 3 ft (914 mm) gauge line had 23 locomotives, 85 passenger cars and 500 freight cars before the conversion to standard gauge began. The transition to standard gauge was interrupted by the 1906 San Francisco earthquake. The line through the Santa Cruz Mountains suffered major damage including a lateral slip of 5 feet (1.5 m) in the tunnel where it crossed the San Andreas Fault. The bridge across San Leandro Bay was damaged and abandoned. Conversion to standard gauge was completed in 1909. 3 ft (914 mm) narrow gauge locomotives numbered 9, 23, and 26 were eventually acquired by the Ilwaco Railway and Navigation Company. Other SPC 3 ft (914 mm) gauge equipment was sold to the Carson and Colorado Railway, the White Pass and Yukon Route, the Nevada County Narrow Gauge Railroad, the Pacific Coast Railway, the Lake Tahoe Railway and Transportation Company, and the Northwestern Pacific Railroad.

=== Standard gauge operation ===
Tunnels of the South Pacific Coast Railroad
1 Tunnel 1 (Cats Canyon)
2 Tunnel 2 (Summit), north/east portal (Wrights Station)
3 Tunnel 2 (Summit), south/west portal (Burns Creek)
4 Tunnel 3 (Laurel), north portal (Laurel)
5 Tunnel 3 (Laurel), south portal (Glenwood)
6 Tunnel 4 (Mountain Charlie)
7 Tunnel 5 (Zayante)
8 Tunnel 6 (Rincon/Coon Gulch)
9 Tunnel 7 (Hogsback)
10 Tunnel 8 (Mission Hill)

The track in Alameda could only be used for local service after being isolated by the 1906 earthquake. It was electrified in 1911 and operated as part of the SP's East Bay Electric Lines until 1941. The remaining line from San Jose to San Leandro Bay became part of the Southern Pacific coast division main line.

However, the southern end of the system from San Jose to Santa Cruz was reclassified as a branch line by 1915, useful only to lighter locomotives, as two or three were required to move trains over the grade. Beginning in 1927, it was used by SP's Suntan Special seasonal excursion trains which came down the San Francisco Peninsula every summer Sunday and took passengers right to the Santa Cruz Beach Boardwalk. The Boulder Creek branch was dismantled in 1934 after a few years of service by a McKeen railmotor. The tracks through the Santa Cruz Mountains suffered major damage during a storm on February 29, 1940. The last train ran on February 26, 1940 and the line was officially abandoned on June 4, 1940.

The line from San Jose to Los Gatos remained in freight service after the last commuter train ran in 1955. The two southernmost tunnels (#8/Mission Hill and #6/Rincon) continued to be used until 1993, when a fire inside the Rincon Tunnel led to a landslide which collapsed it. The Santa Cruz depot was used for SP's surviving coastal line from Watsonville Junction until the building was sold the 1970s and converted to a restaurant.

=== Tunnels ===
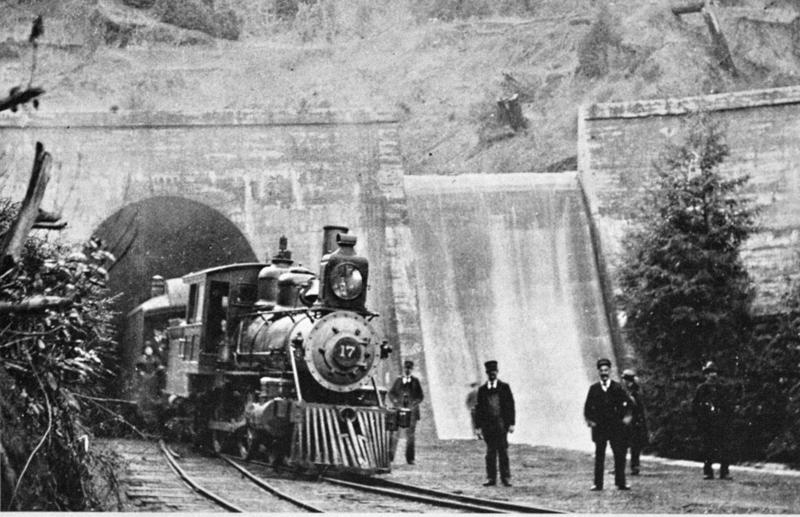
North portal of Summit Tunnel, 1895

In total, the line would include eight tunnels, of which five were built for SPCR, and two were previously built for the Santa Cruz and Felton Railroad (#7/Hogsback and #8/Mission Hill), south of where the two lines met at Big Trees; the Felton was absorbed into the SPCR by 1879. Two were daylighted (#1/Cats Canyon) during or prior to the conversion to standard gauge in the early 1900s. Two survive today (#5/Zayante and #8/Mission Hill), although only the Mission Hill tunnel still carries rail traffic.

South Pacific Coast Railroad tunnels
Number		Name	Length	Notes
Original	Regauged	Name	Length	Notes
1	N/A	Cats Canyon	191 ft (58 m)	Approx. 0.3 mi (0.48 km) south of Los Gatos Station, built through a rock outcropping in Cats Canyon. Daylighted as an open cut in 1903 during the conversion of the railroad to standard gauge.
2	1	Summit / Wrights	6,200 ft (1,900 m)	Longest. Ran from Wrights Station to Burns Creek near Laurel, crossing underneath Summit Road. Portals sealed in 1942.
3	2	Laurel / Glenwood	5,793 ft (1,766 m)	Second longest tunnel. Connected Laurel to Glenwood, crossing underneath the present location of California State Route 17. Portals sealed in 1942.
4	3	Glenwood / Mtn Charlie / Clems	913 ft (278 m)	Connected Clems, under a ridge, to Mountain Charlie gulch. Portals sealed in 1942.
5	4	Zayante / Storage Vault	250 ft (76 m)	One of the shortest tunnels, in Zayante. It is currently being used as a records storage facility by Iron Mountain.
6	5	Coon Gulch / Rincon	338 ft (103 m)	In San Lorenzo Gorge; originally built in 1879 to ease a sharp curve around a rock outcropping that had previously damaged trains. Damaged by fire in 1993 and bypassed.
7	N/A	Hogsback	282 ft (86 m)	Also in San Lorenzo Gorge; it was originally 127 ft (39 m) long when it opened in 1875 and lengthened in 1879, but it collapsed in 1898 and was daylighted.
8	6	Mission Hill	927 ft (283 m)	In Santa Cruz itself, carries the route under Mission Santa Cruz. As initially completed, 918 ft (280 m) long.

The construction of Tunnel #2/Summit started in 1877, with Chinese workers under O.B. Castle. It would take nearly two years and 30 lives to complete, as it crosses the San Andreas Fault and workers encountered oil and natural gas seepage which would explode. One series of explosions, early in the morning of November 18, 1879, claimed multiple lives. It was destroyed by a 5 ft (1.5 m) lateral shift following the 1906 San Francisco earthquake and had to be dug again; with the broad-gauge conversion, the work was not completed until March 1909.

Three of these tunnels were sealed shortly after the line was abandoned: #2/Summit, #3/Glenwood (Laurel), and #4/Mountain Charlie (Clems). Under contract to Southern Pacific, the F.A. Christie railroad salvage firm removed the track and trestles and, when this was completed in April 1942, dynamited these three tunnels. Although a long-persistent rumor holds that destruction of the tunnels was motivated by post-Pearl Harbor fears of a Japanese invasion of the United States West Coast, the decision to dynamite them predated the Pearl Harbor attack and was made solely for business reasons. Tunnel #5/Zayante was also part of the abandoned line, but it was used as a private road after the tracks were abandoned and then as a storage site.

== Narrow gauge locomotives ==
Number	Wheel arrangement	Builder	Builder Serial number	Date built	Disposition by 1909	Notes
1	4-4-0	Baldwin Locomotive Works	3715	1875	Sold before 1894.	Originally lettered San Joaquin & Northern #1
2	4-4-0	Baldwin Locomotive Works	3970	1876	Scrapped 1902.	
3	4-4-0	Baldwin Locomotive Works	3971	1876	Sold to Colusa & Lake Railroad #4 in 1910.	Scrapped after the C&L closed.
4	4-4-0	Baldwin Locomotive Works	4214	1877	Scrapped 1901.	
5	4-4-0	Baldwin Locomotive Works	4222	1877	Sold to Lake Tahoe Railway & Transportation Company #5 in 1906.	Scrapped 1926.
6	4-4-0	Baldwin Locomotive Works	4223	1877	Moved to the San Bernardino & Redlands Railway in 1906.	Moved to the Carson & Colorado #6 in 1917 after electrification of the SB&R. Scrapped 1926.
7	4-4-0	Baldwin Locomotive Works	4224	1877	Renumbered in 1905 to #26.	
8	4-4-0	Baldwin Locomotive Works	4225	1877	Scrapped 1898.	
9	4-4-0	Baldwin Locomotive Works	4956	1880	Sold in 1908 to Ilwaco Railway & Navigation Company #5.	Scrapped 1937.
10	4-4-0	Baldwin Locomotive Works	4960	1880	Sold to Northwestern Pacific #10	Later renumbered NWP#87, scrapped 1917.
11	2-6-0	Baldwin Locomotive Works	5649	1881	Moved to Carson & Colorado #11	Rebuilt in 1924 to a 4-6-0. Scrapped 1934.
12	2-6-0	Baldwin Locomotive Works	5650	1881	Moved to Carson & Colorado #12	Rebuilt in 1924 to a 4-6-0. Scrapped 1934.
13	2-8-0	Baldwin Locomotive Works	6157	1882	Moved to Carson & Colorado #13	sold in 1915 to Lake Tahoe Railway & transportation Company #13. Scrapped 1927.
14	4-4-0	Baldwin Locomotive Works	7249	1884	Sold to Northwestern Pacific #85	Wrecked 1924, rebuilt and renumbered to NWP#93. Scrapped 1935.
15	4-4-0	Baldwin Locomotive Works	7236	1884	Sold to Northwestern Pacific #19	Later renumbered NWP#86, sold to Duncan Mills Land & Lumber Company, scrapped 1926.
16	4-4-0	Baldwin Locomotive Works	7604	1885	Moved to Carson & Colorado #9	Scrapped 1911.
17	4-4-0	Baldwin Locomotive Works	7605	1885	Moved to Carson & Colorado #10	Scrapped 1933.
18	4-6-0	Baldwin Locomotive Works	7939	1886	Moved to Carson & Colorado #14	Retired 1945. Presumed Scrapped.
19	4-6-0	Baldwin Locomotive Works	7941	1886	Moved to Carson & Colorado #16	Scrapped 1935.
20	4-6-0	Baldwin Locomotive Works	8486	1887	Sold to Northwestern Pacific #21	Renumbered #144 then #94. Scrapped 1935.
21	4-6-0	Baldwin Locomotive Works	8487	1887	Moved to Carson & Colorado #17	Retired and dismantled 1945, boiler used until 1952 for heating at the Salem, Oregon, engine terminal when Scrapped.
22	4-6-0	Baldwin Locomotive Works	9929	1889	Moved to Carson & Colorado #15	Scrapped 1935.
23	4-6-0	Baldwin Locomotive Works	11925	1891	Sold in 1907 to Ilwaco Railway & Navigation Company #6	Scrapped 1937.
24	2-6-0	New York Locomotive Works	21	1883	Scrapped 1902.	Was Portland & Willamette Valley #2, purchased 1897.
25	2-6-0	New York Locomotive Works	22	1883	Sold in 1907 to La Dicha & Pacific #1.	Was Portland & Willamette Valley #3, purchased 1897. Sold in 1915 to Nevada County Narrow Gauge #6, retired 1921. Scrapped 1936
26	4-4-0	Baldwin Locomotive Works	4224	1877	Sold in 1907 to Ilwaco Railway & Navigation Company #3	Was #7, renumbered in 1905. Scrapped 1937.

== Ferry service ==
The first ferry terminal was built on Dumbarton Point in 1876. The Alameda terminal opened on March 20, 1878 for a shorter ferry ride to San Francisco. With two ferries, the company offered hourly trips between Alameda and San Francisco beginning in July 1878. These three side-wheel passenger ferries with vertical beam engines saw service on other routes under Southern Pacific ownership.

Name	Number	Builder	Launch	Tonnage	Length	Beam	Depth	Horsepower	Crew
Newark		Collyer	18 April 1877	1783	268'	42'	12.8'	1200	30
Newark		rebuilt	1903	2197	268'	42'	18.8'	1200	18
Newark	130118	rebuilt	1923	2254	268'	42'	18.8'	1400	18
Bay City	3068	Collyer	18 May 1878	1283	230'	36.8'	13.6'	800	13
Garden City	85592	Collyer	20 June 1879	1080	208'	37'	13.6'	625	19

=== Newark ===
Southern Pacific transferred Newark to their Oakland pier for runs to San Francisco. Newark suffered minor flooding when rammed in fog by the Southern Pacific ferry Oakland on December 7, 1908. Newark was disabled by a mid-bay engine failure on November 9, 1920, and drifted more than an hour before being towed ashore by tugs. Newark was taken into the Southern Pacific shipyard in 1923 and rebuilt into the largest all-passenger ferry on San Francisco Bay.

The rebuilt ferry was named Sacramento when launched in January 1924. She went into service on February 9, 1924 with a speed of 14.5 knots and completely filled the San Francisco Ferry Building slip. She was rated to carry 4,000 passengers, but only had seating for 1,900. After the San Francisco–Oakland Bay Bridge and Golden Gate Bridge opened in 1936 and 1937, Southern Pacific passenger ferry service was reduced to a single route between San Francisco and the Oakland Pier in 1939. Sacramento became the standby boat when the ferries assigned to that route needed repair. As the other ferries wore out during World War II, Sacramento became one of two boats in active service until suffering a major mechanical failure on November 28, 1954. The ferry was stripped of machinery and towed to Southern California to be a moored fishing platform near Redondo Beach, California, where she sank during a storm on 1 December 1964.

=== Bay City ===
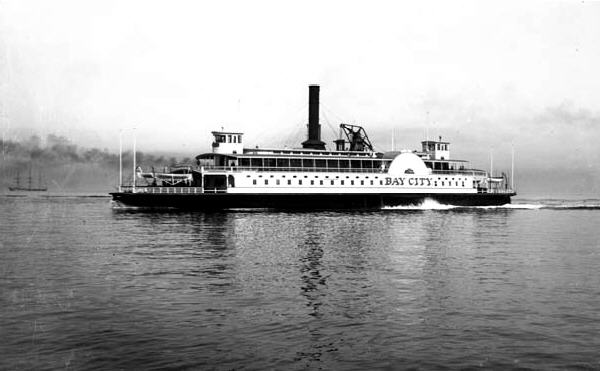
Bay City operating under Southern Pacific ownership

Bay City stayed on the Alameda route under Southern Pacific ownership, and survived collision with the lumber schooner Tampico on a foggy day in 1906. She lost a rudder and had several lifeboats smashed on April 5, 1911 when misunderstood signals caused collision with the Southern Pacific ferry Berkeley. On July 8, 1912, Bay City lost power when the engine main shaft broke, and drifted in the mid-bay until a tug arrived to tow her ashore. Southern Pacific ferry Melrose collided with Bay City in a dense patch of fog on January 26, 1913. Bay City was repaired after each mishap; and stayed in trans-bay service until dismantled for scrap in 1929.

=== Garden City ===
Garden City was built with a 3 ft (914 mm) narrow gauge track on the main deck to carry freight cars to San Francisco; but she could also carry passengers as a relief ferry when either of the other two ferries needed repairs. Southern Pacific used Garden City as a relief boat for their auto ferry run on the old "creek route". Garden City stayed on the "creek route" as a passenger ferry when auto ferry service was shifted to the Oakland pier.

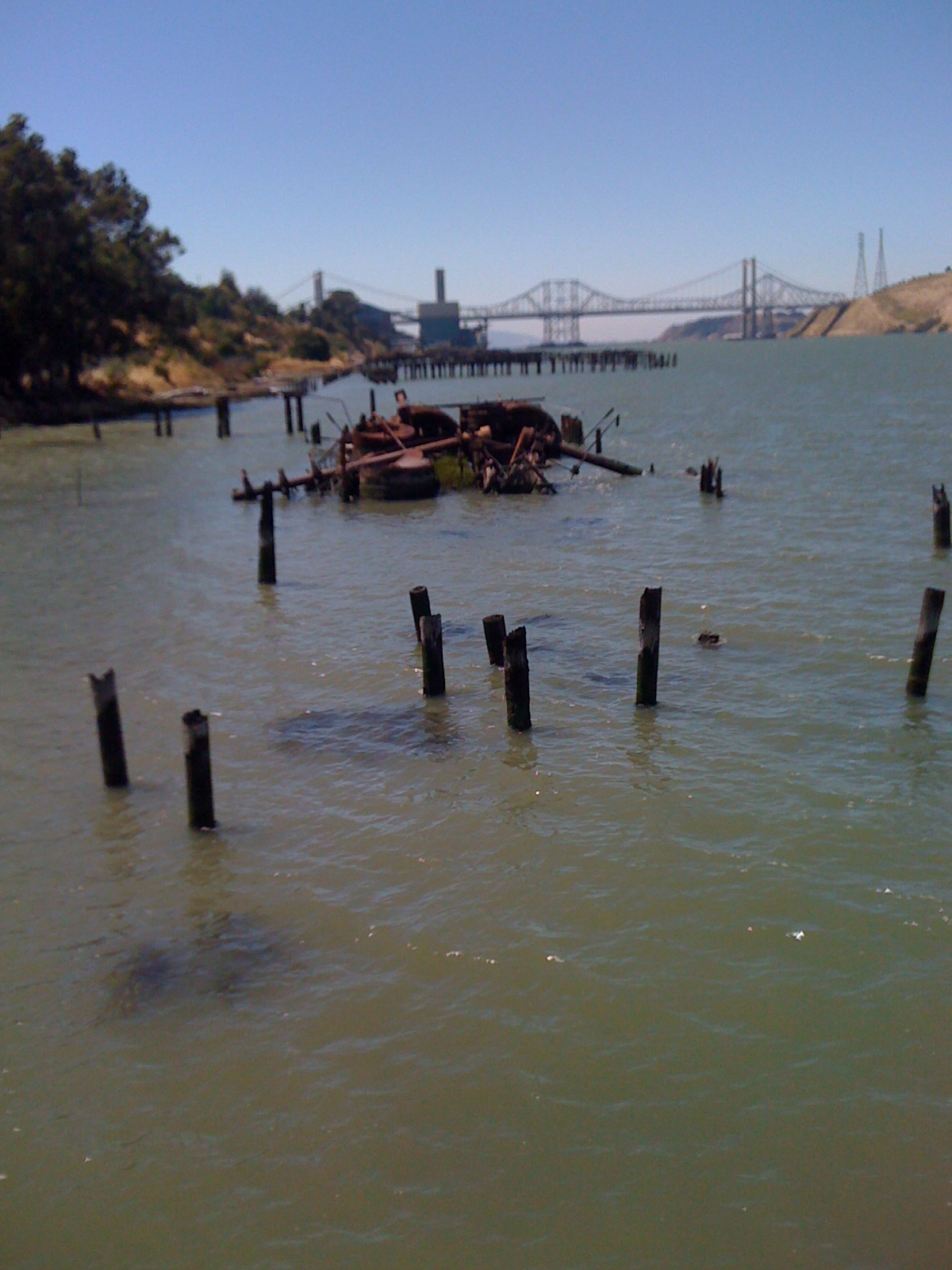
Carquinez Bridge from Eckley Pier (2010); the remains of Garden City are in the foreground amongst pilings.

Garden City attempted an eastbound bay crossing during a full gale on Christmas morning, 1921. After steaming into the wind for 90 minutes on what was normally an 18-minute trip, the ferry found its destination slip was occupied by the ferry Edward T. Jeffery seeking shelter from the storm. The other ferry vacated the slip, but Garden City was unable to maneuver in the wind, and started drifting when its rudder broke while attempting to return to San Francisco. A rescue tug arrived and took the ferry in tow, but the tow line parted, and the ferry drifted into the Key system pier. The pier was seriously damaged and the ferry passengers were drenched by waves breaking 20 feet high as they crawled to safety. Southern Pacific retired Garden City the following year; but traffic remained so heavy through the 1920s that the boat was repeatedly pulled out of retirement for temporary service when other boats needed repair. After her last run in 1929, the old ferry was moored as a fishing resort in Eckley, California. Eckley is gone, the site now being part of Carquinez Strait Regional Shoreline Park, and the remains of the Garden City are easily visible from the park's Eckley fishing pier.

== Horse power on branch lines ==
Alfred Davis, early owner of the railroad, had an affinity for horses, and found several opportunities to utilize the animals on his system. Horses provided motive power for several branch lines as well as yard work. Draught traction was successfully utilized at the ferry landing in San Francisco for transloading, and their deployment was expanded elsewhere. The Centerville branch operated exclusively as a horsecar shuttle train line from 1882 until it was converted to standard gauge in 1909. The city of Berkeley forbade steam power along Telegraph Avenue, which forced the pioneering Oakland Railroad Company to use horses along Telegraph Avenue. That line was acquired by the South Pacific Coast in 1885. The Lick Mill spur at Agnew also utilized horses along with the steep line to California Powder Works in the Santa Cruz Mountains. Horses also supplemented steam power at yards in San Jose and Santa Cruz.

== Surviving infrastructure ==
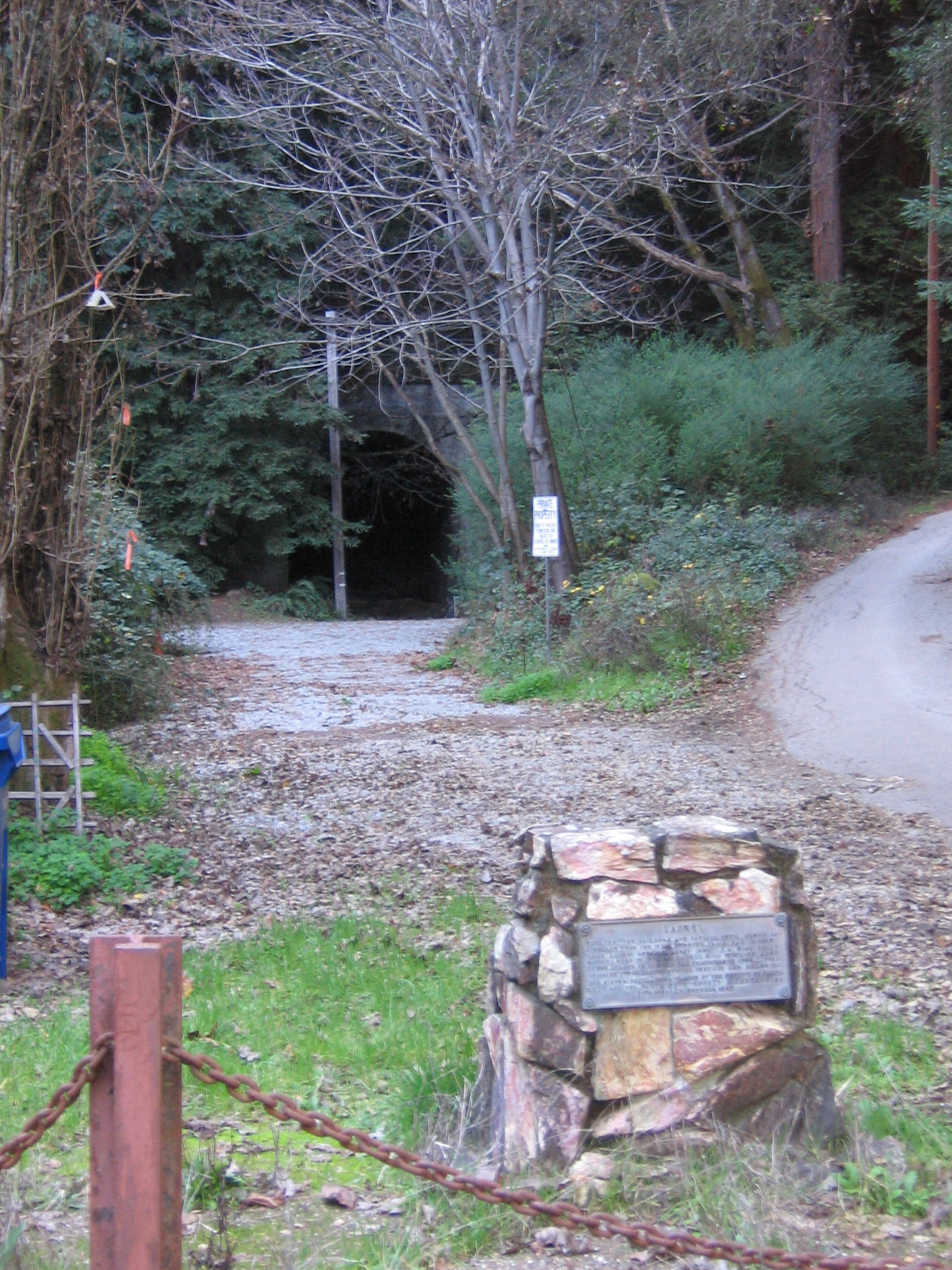
Laurel/Glenwood tunnel portal as it appears today

Trackage

- The north–south line from Oakland, California, to San Jose, California, is operated by the Union Pacific Railroad as the Coast Subdivision. Between Newark, California, and San Jose it is used by Amtrak's Capitol Corridor and Coast Starlight trains and the Altamont Corridor Express commuter rail service.
- The Dumbarton Cutoff connecting Niles and Newark is immediately south of the SPC branch line from Newark to the Fremont Amtrak station in the Centerville District.
- The line running southwest from San Jose towards the Santa Cruz mountains still exists as far as Vasona Junction, and is operated by the Union Pacific Railroad as part of the Vasona Industrial Lead. The right of way is shared with the southwest end of the VTA light rail Vasona Corridor (now the Green Line, which opened in 2005, operated by the Santa Clara Valley Transportation Authority between Campbell, California, and San Jose Diridon station
- The western end of the Santa Cruz mountain crossing, from Olympia, California, to Santa Cruz, California, is now the Santa Cruz, Big Trees and Pacific Railway, primarily a tourist operation but also carries lumber. Operations include the southernmost (Mission Hill) tunnel.

The Santa Cruz, Big Trees and Pacific Railway operates its excursion train on SPC trackage it purchased in 1985

Stations

- Agnew Depot was used by the Southern Pacific and was purchased by the California Central Model Railroad Club in 1963.
- San Jose Diridon station is located on the site of the former South Pacific Coast San Jose station.
- "New" Felton station, despite its relative remoteness, has gone essentially unretired for its lifespan. Southern Pacific formally closed the station in February 1962, however the site was purchased by Norman Clark for his Roaring Camp Railroad later that same year. The station building served as the ticket shack between 1963 and 1967, before the park's modern ticket office was constructed. Today, it serves as a storage building. The nearby freight house also survives today as the railroads' corporate office.

Right of Way

- The portion of the Los Gatos Creek Trail that runs from just north of the Lexington Reservoir to just south of downtown Los Gatos runs on the old route.
- Most if not all of the RoW exist south of Lexington. The San Jose Water Company uses the right of way as a private access road, visible in certain areas such as the Aldercroft flag stop.
- In Santa Cruz County, the ROW is broken up into land plots, driveways, and main streets for communities like Laurel and Glenwood. Between the Mt. Charlie Tunnel and the Zayante Tunnel, the grade exists uninterrupted as a Santa Cruz Water District service road above the Zayante Creek. South of Zayante Tunnel, the ROW follows an unnamed grade to Old Kenville Road and Zayante School Road, before finally rejoining the Big Trees & Pacific Railway to Santa Cruz.

== See also ==
- Ilwaco Railway and Navigation Company
- Society for the Preservation of Carter Railroad Resources
