= Eccles, California =

Unincorporated community in California, United States

Coordinates: 37°04′55″N 122°02′59″W

Eccles, California is a ghost town in Santa Cruz County, near Felton, east of Ben Lomond. It was near where Lompico Creek flows into Zayante Creek.

Located between Zayante and Felton, Eccles was a stop on the narrow gauge South Pacific Coast Railroad that ran from Santa Cruz to Oakland from 1880 to 1940. The railroad carried lumber and local produce. It was acquired by the Southern Pacific in the later 1880s, which converted it to standard gauge and added weekend excursion trains. The April 18, 1906, earthquake damaged or destroyed tracks, tunnels, and bridges. However, Southern Pacific repaired the line and operated it until March 1940, when it suspended operations. State Route 17, completed in 1940, bypassed Eccles, contributing to its decline.

The area today is mostly rural and heavily wooded. The tracks survive from Olympia (just south of the site of Eccles) to Santa Cruz, and are now owned by the Santa Cruz, Big Trees and Pacific Railway.
