= Burrell, California =

- Early settlement
- Location within the state of California Burrell, California (the United States)
- Coordinates: 37°7′18″N 121°55′47″W
- Country: United States
- State: California
- County: Santa Cruz
- Time zone: UTC-8 (Pacific (PST))
  - Summer (DST): UTC-7 (PDT)

Burrell, California was an early settlement in Santa Cruz County near the summit of the Santa Cruz Mountains, 1.5 miles (2.4 km) south-southeast of Wrights. It was named for Lyman Jabez Burrell, who settled there in the early 1850s. There was a Burrell School, which was later abandoned. A hotel was operated by James Richard Wright, whose son John Vincent Wright was honored by the naming of Wright's Station, which was more commonly known as Wrights.

The settlement was located at latitude 370718N, longitude 1215547W; decimal degrees: latitude 37.12167, longitude -121.92972. The site is at the junction of Summit Road and Loma Prieta Avenue.

Today, the site, including the restored historic school building, is home to the Burrell School Winery and Vineyards. David and Anne Moulton began development of the Estate vineyard in 1973. At a 1,600-foot (490 m) elevation, the site faces to the southwest. Soils are a complex mixture of loam and shale due to the close proximity to the San Andreas Fault. Initial plantings were to Chardonnay and Merlot, with Pinot Noir added in 2002. Cultivation and spraying are done with heritage Cletrac tractors; pruning, seasonal operations and picking are all done by hand.
