= Laurel, California =

Laurel
- Ghost town
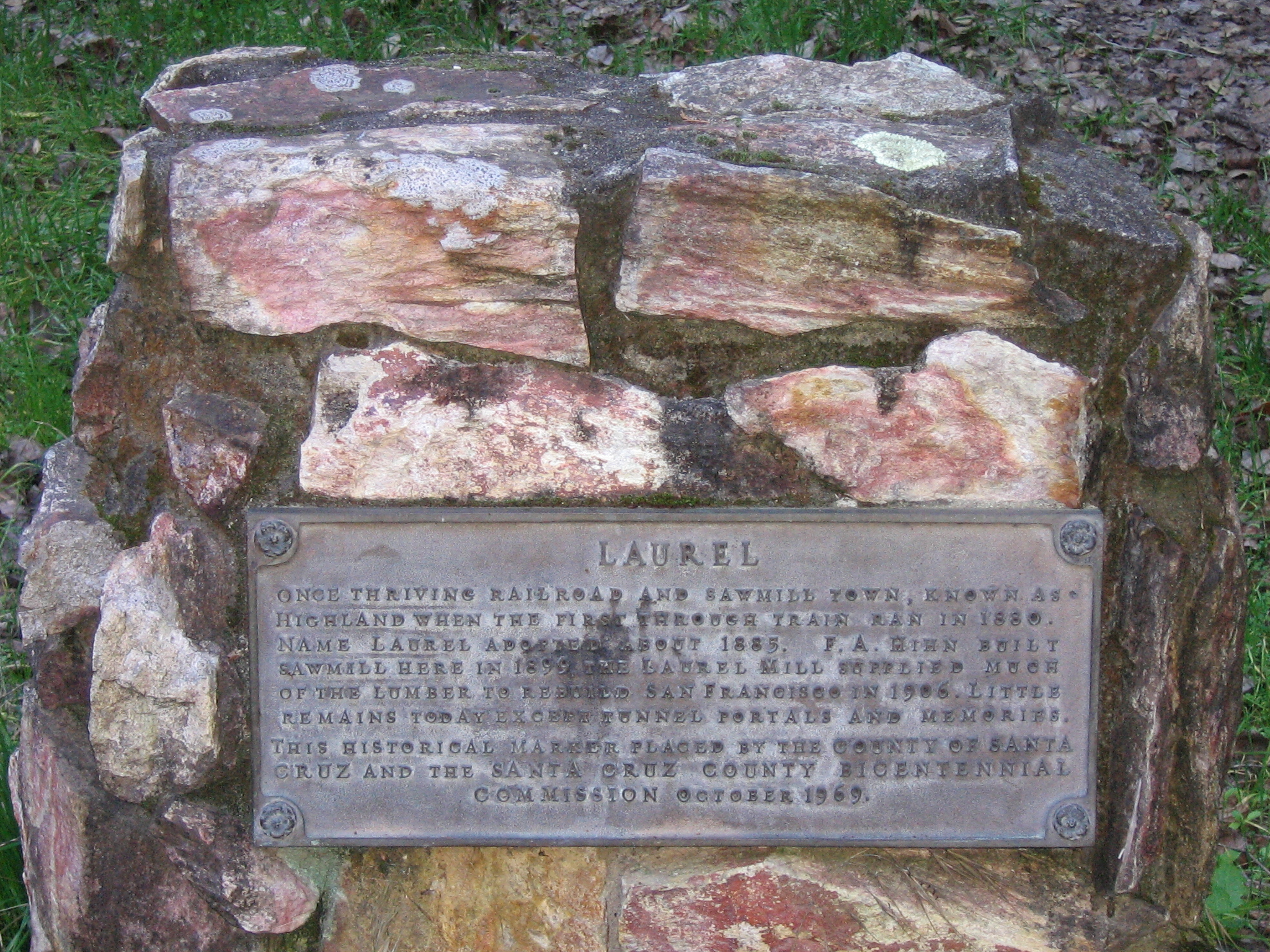
- Historical marker at Laurel

- Location within the state of California
- Coordinates: 37°7′0″N 121°57′55″W
- Country: United States
- State: California
- County: Santa Cruz
- Time zone: UTC-8 (Pacific (PST))
  - Summer (DST): UTC-7 (PDT)

Laurel is a ghost town in Santa Cruz County, California, United States, in the Santa Cruz Mountains. It is in a valley at an elevation of 900 feet (270 m) above sea level.

== History ==
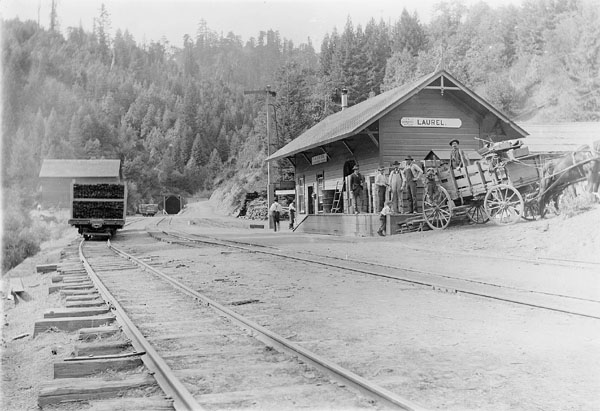
The station building for Laurel with the portal for the Glenwood Tunnel in the background in 1905.

A toll road was built from Los Gatos to Santa Cruz, passing through the eventual site of Laurel, and was utilized by stagecoaches. Then, a narrow gauge railroad was constructed over the mountains to provide transportation for lumber and the numerous crops grown in the area. Rather than wind around the steep slopes, a series of tunnels bored through successive ridges. Laurel sat in a narrow valley between the two longest tunnel segments, both over a mile long.

The longest and highest of the tunnels began northwest of Laurel at Wrights Station (sometimes designated "Wright's Station" or simply "Wrights"), about a mile east of Patchen. From Wrights Station it went through a 6,200-foot (2 km) tunnel to a point just north of Laurel.

During the construction of the Summit tunnel (which leads to Wrights), a strong flow of natural gas was encountered, and an explosion followed, which resulted in the death of 32 Chinese workers. The main leak was subsequently stopped, but gas continued to escape in small quantities. The extent of the supply was unknown.

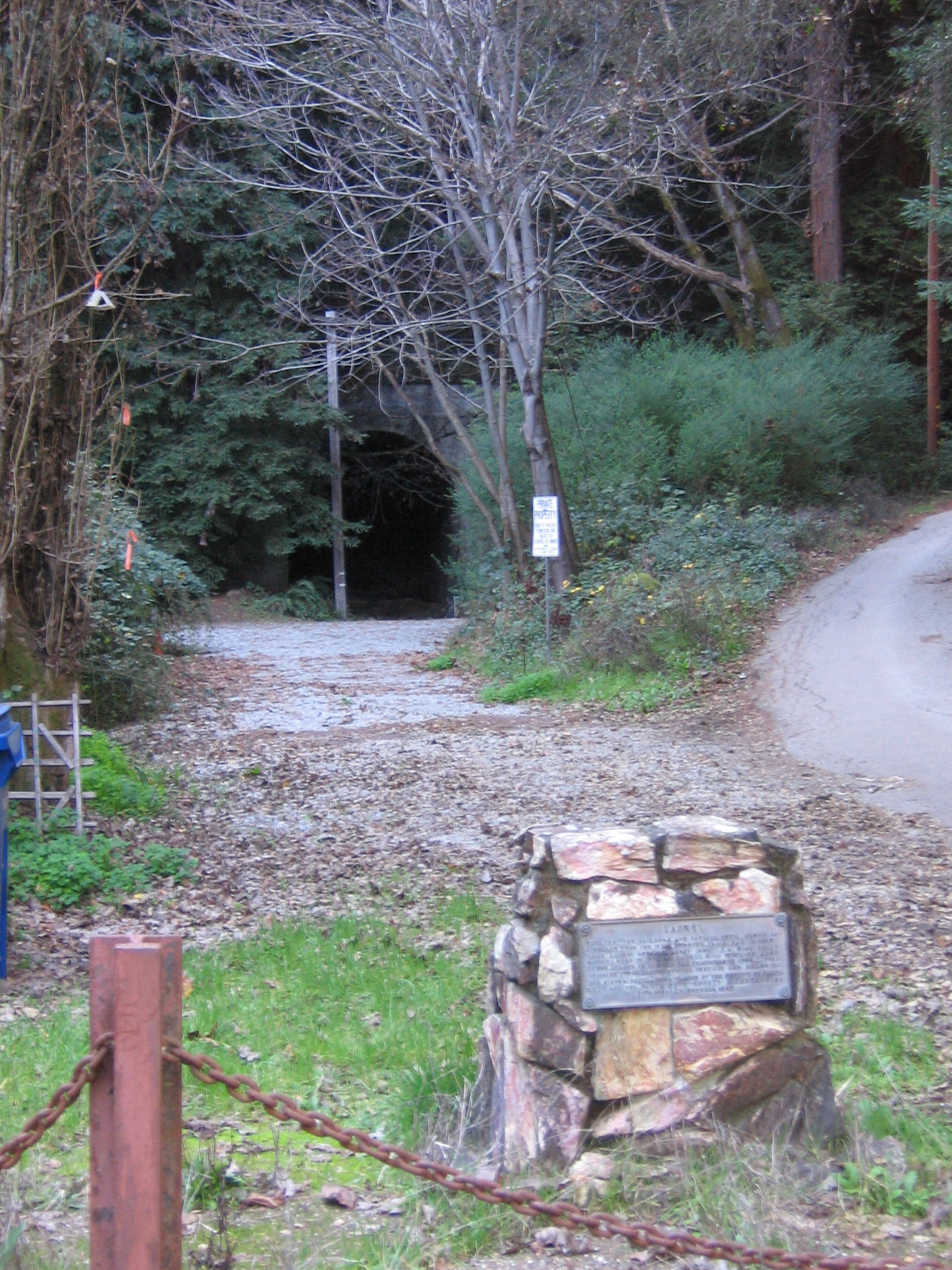
Laurel/Glenwood tunnel portal as it appears in 2009

At Laurel, the rail line entered another long tunnel, continuing to the southwest and emerging just north of Glenwood. That tunnel cut through a ridge, 500 ft (200 m) below today's State Highway 17.

The railroad was completed in 1880 from Los Gatos to Felton, and on south to Santa Cruz. The railroad was later purchased by the Southern Pacific.

The area was seriously affected by the April 18, 1906, earthquake, largely because the San Andreas Fault passes through the mountains. There were numerous offsets and fissures, resulting in damage to the rails, bridges, and tunnels. Homes and businesses were damaged or destroyed as well. The railroad recovered from the disaster and operated until heavy rains in February 1940 caused major landslides; the Southern Pacific decided not to repair the damage. Completion of State Route 17, west of Laurel, that same year also contributed to the demise of the railroad and several small communities, including Laurel, that were located along the railroad right-of-way. Since then, some homes have been built around the site of Laurel, but the village itself no longer exists. Laurel Drive passes through the village's site.
