= Olympia, California =

Coordinates: 37.071°N 122.059°W

Olympia is an unincorporated community in Santa Cruz County, California, located north of Felton on Zayante Creek (a tributary of the San Lorenzo River). Olympia was established after the South Pacific Coast narrow-gauge railroad completed a line over the Santa Cruz Mountains from Los Gatos in 1880. Olympia remained a scheduled stop after the Southern Pacific railroad took over the line in the later 1880s, using it until the line shut down in 1940. A siding served a nearby sand and gravel quarry. In 1915, a post office was closed at Eccles and moved 1/2 mile to Olympia. The name survives in Olympia Station Road, a short dead-end road off Zayante Road (which parallels the creek) that crosses the tracks.
