= Glenwood, California =

Glenwood
- Unincorporated area
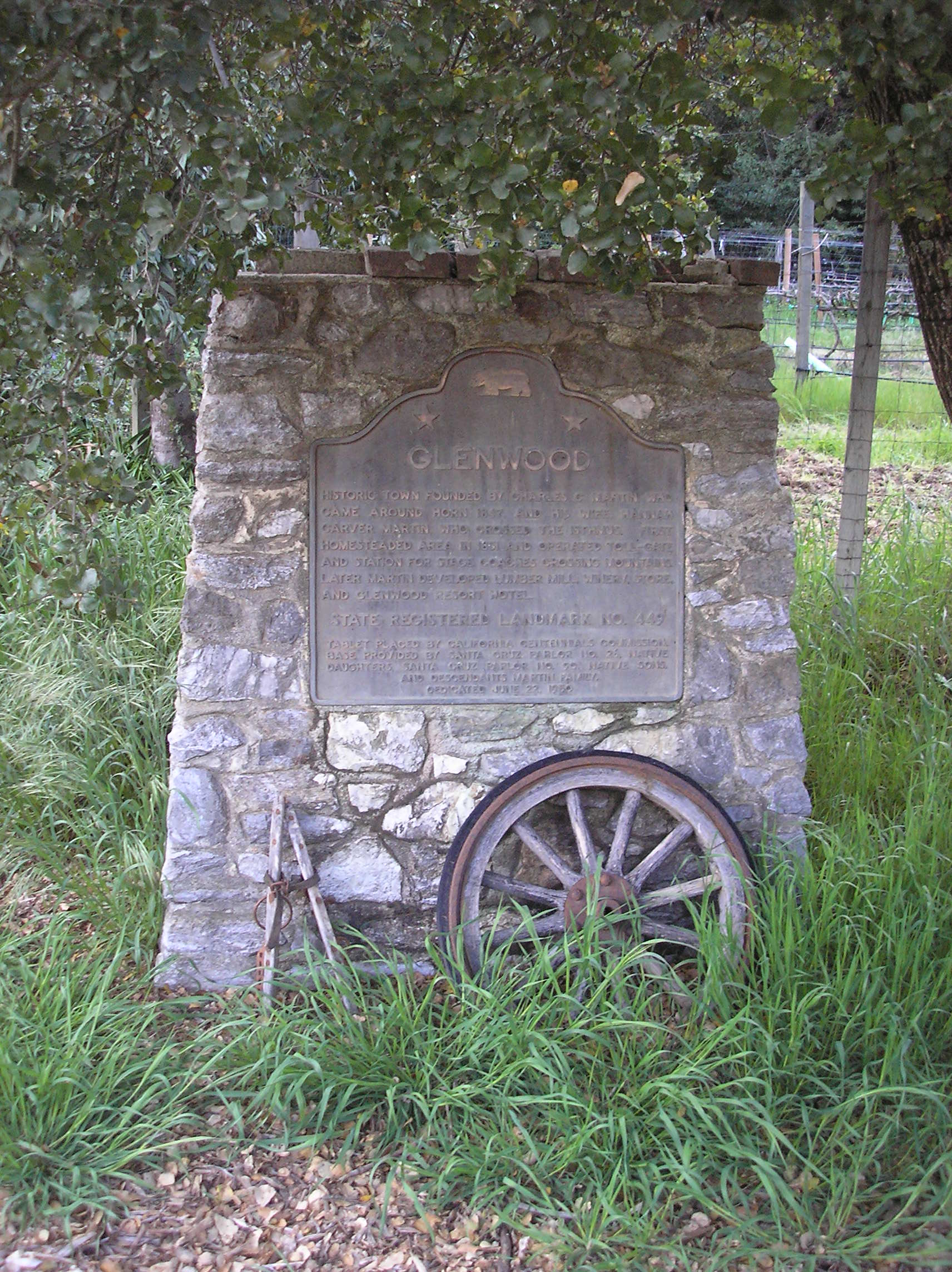
- Historical marker for Glenwood, California
- Interactive map of Glenwood
- Country: United States
- State: California
- County: Santa Cruz
- Established: 1851
- Elevation: 515 ft (157 m)

Population (2008)
  - Metro: 50
  - Demonym: Glenwoodian
- Time zone: UTC-8 (PST)
  - Summer (DST): UTC-7 (PDT)
- Area code: 408

California Historical Landmark
- Reference no.: 449

Glenwood is an unincorporated area of Santa Cruz County, California, United States. It is located at coordinates 37°6′29″N 121°59′8″W, and is 891 feet above sea level.

== History ==
This historic community, registered as a California Historical Landmark, was founded by Charles C. Martin, who came around Cape Horn in 1847, and his wife, Hannah Carver Martin, who crossed the Isthmus of Panama. Charles Martin first homesteaded the area in 1851 and operated a tollgate and station for stagecoaches crossing the mountains. Later he developed a lumber mill, winery, store, and the Glenwood Resort Hotel. It was known as Martinville from its foundation in 1851 until the establishment of the post office on August 23, 1880.

Glenwood was a stop on the narrow gauge South Pacific Coast Railroad (SPC), which began service from Alameda (north terminus, with a ferry to San Francisco) to Felton in 1880. At Felton, the SPC bought and connected to the former Felton & Santa Cruz Railroad tracks, which ran the remaining six miles southwards through Santa Cruz and out onto a wharf on Monterey Bay. To minimize length and steepness, six tunnels were dug through ridges of the Santa Cruz Mountains. Tunnel Number 2 exited at Glenwood and Tunnel Number 3 exited from just south of Glenwood.

The railroad was acquired in the 1880s by the Southern Pacific, which broad-gauged the line in the early 1900s. The April 18, 1906 San Francisco earthquake twisted some of the rails and damaged bridges and tunnels along the line. The Southern Pacific repaired the railroad, and it continued operations until March 1940. The routing of State Route 17 (SR 17), completed during 1940, barely bypassed Glenwood, contributing to its decline.

Glenwood officially "disappeared" with the closing of the Glenwood U.S. post office in 1954. Mrs. Margaret Koch, a well-known local-history author and great-granddaughter of founder Charles Martin, served as Glenwood's last postmistress.

== Status ==
The area is now a sparsely-settled semi-rural community. From Highway 17, the exit to Glenwood Drive, also known as Glenwood Highway, passes through the site of the original town and by the historical marker (see image at right). It travels south into the town of Scotts Valley and intersects with Scotts Valley Drive.
