= South San Jose =

Region of San Jose, California

Coordinates: 37.238635°N 121.838336°W

- Region of San Jose, California
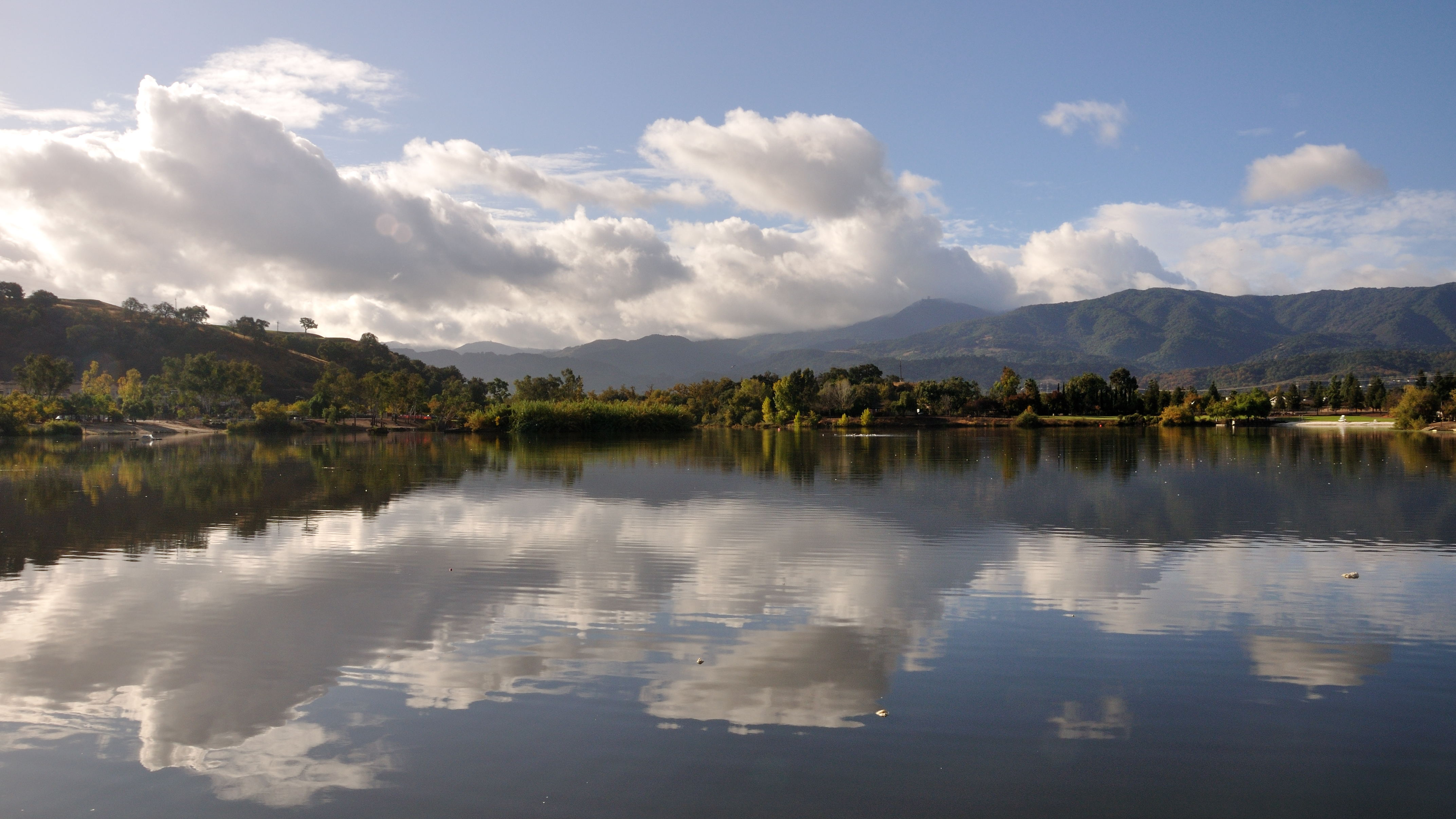
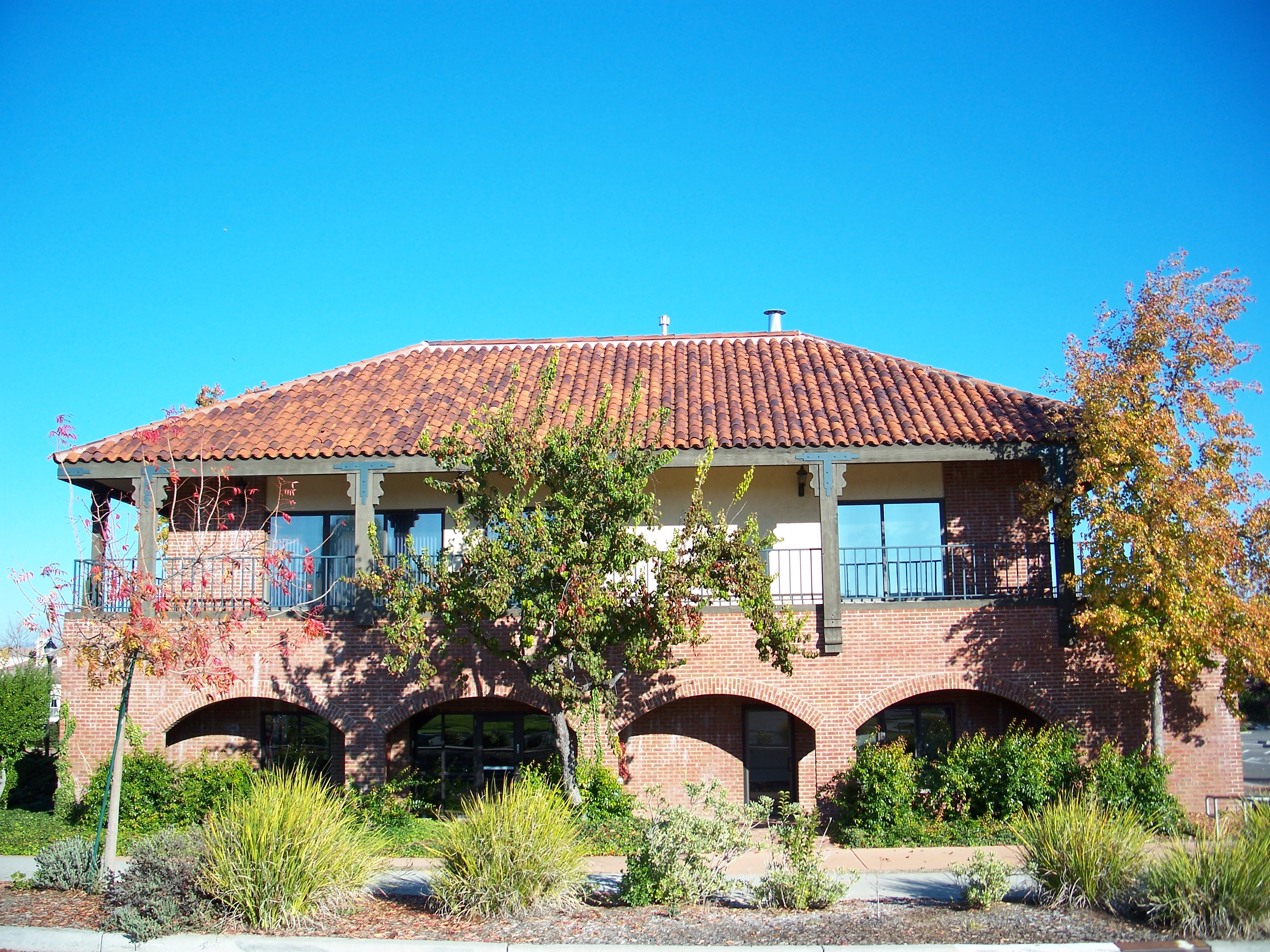
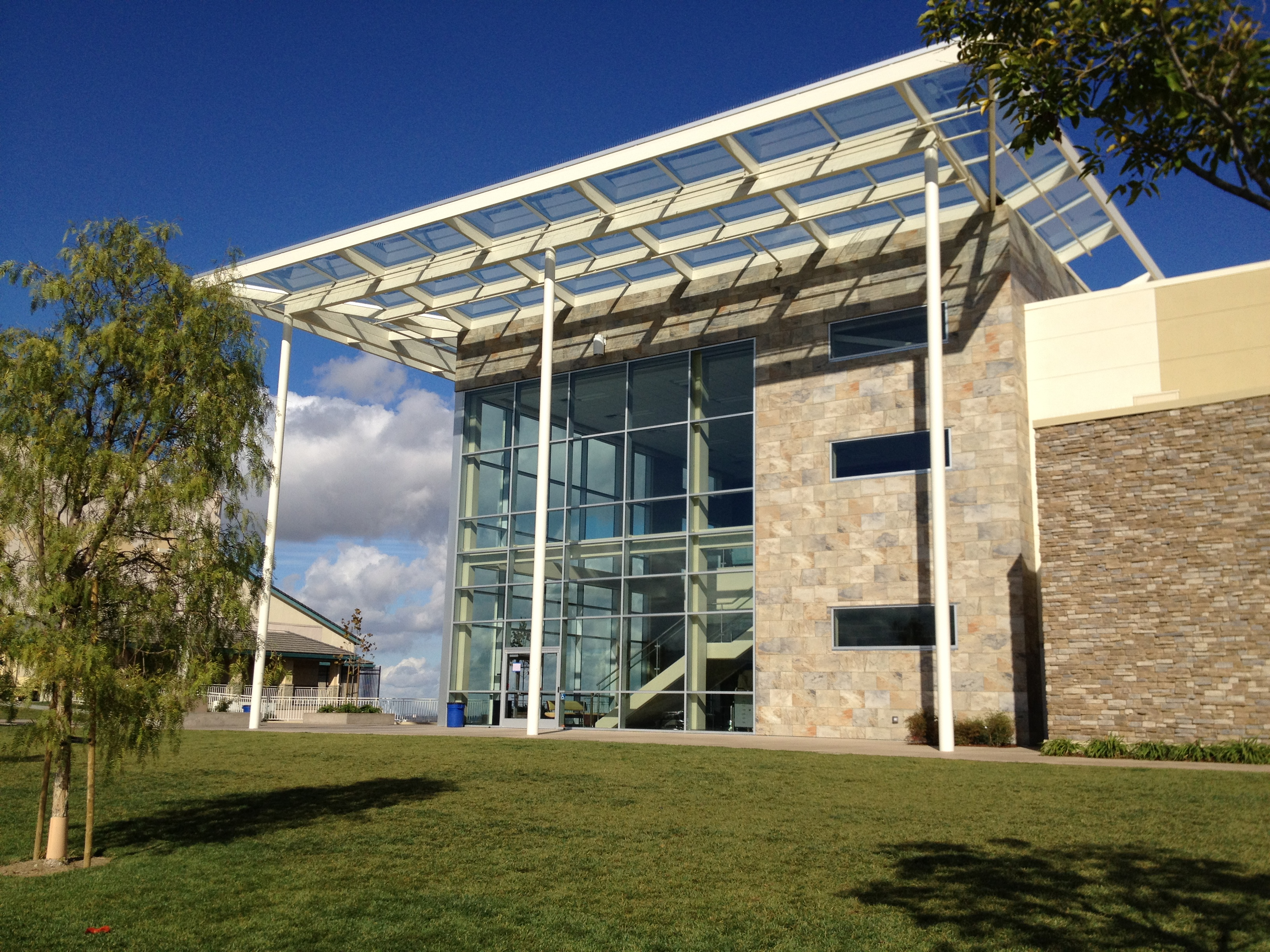
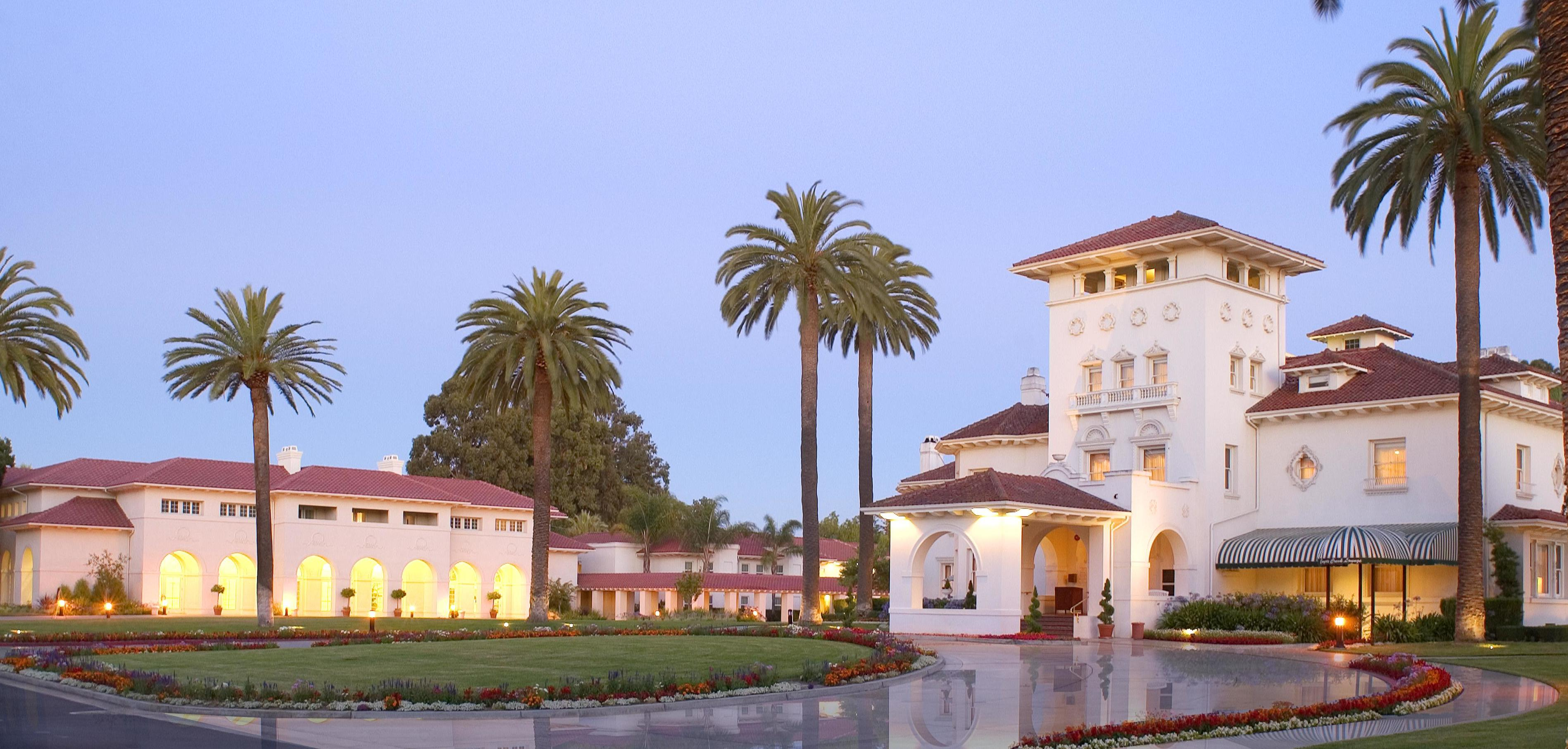
- Clockwise: Almaden Lake Park in Almaden Valley; Valley Christian High School in Edenvale; Hayes Mansion in Edenvale; Old Almaden Winery in Almaden Valley.
- Interactive map of South San Jose

Population
  - Total: 406,000
- Zip codes: 95111, 95119, 95120, 95123, 95136, 95138, 95139, 95193

South San Jose is the southern region of San Jose, California. The name "South Side" refers to an area bounded roughly by Hillsdale Avenue and Capitol Expressway to the North, Camden Avenue to the West, Highway 101 and Hellyer Avenue on the east, the border with the city of Morgan Hill towards the south, and Los Gatos, to the west.

The area is expansive with a mix of businesses, green space, and parks. Two business districts, urban villages, and a highly educated workforce make the region of South San Jose attractive to workers and companies.

== Neighborhoods ==
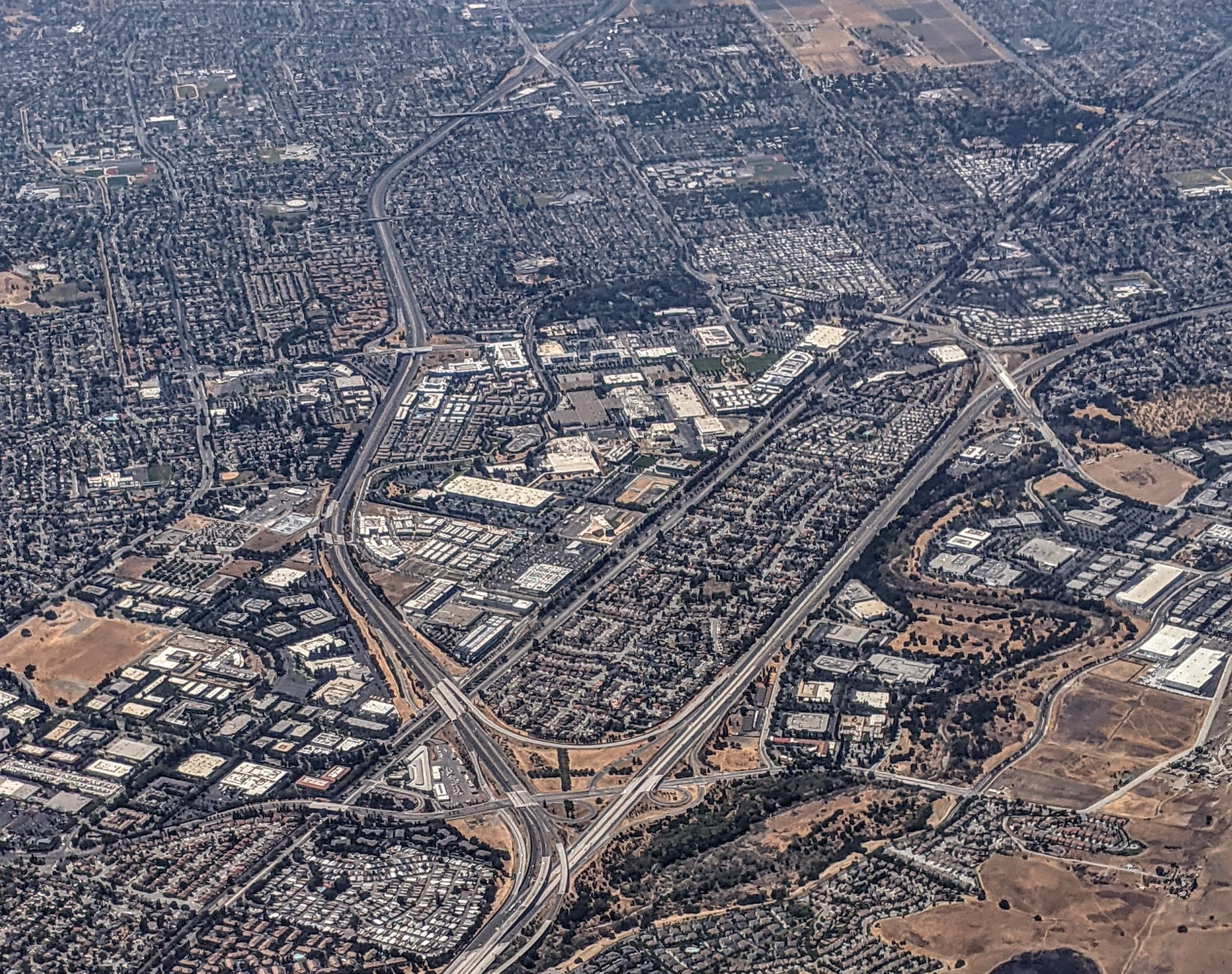
Aerial view of Santa Teresa, a neighborhood in South San Jose.

Neighborhoods in South San Jose include:

- Almaden Valley
  - Calero
  - New Almaden
- Blossom Valley
- Edenvale
- Santa Teresa
- Seven Trees

== Light rail stations ==
- Capitol (VTA)
- Branham (VTA)
- Ohlone-Chynoweth (VTA)
- Almaden (VTA)
- Blossom Hill (VTA)
- Snell (VTA)
- Cottle (VTA)
- Santa Teresa (VTA)

== Parks and trails ==
- Coyote Creek Trail
- Guadalupe River Trail
- Almaden Quicksilver County Park
- Edenvale Gardens Regional Park
- Santa Teresa County Park
- Martial Cottle Park

== Major highways ==
- SR 85
- SR 87
- CR G8

== See also ==
- Oakridge Mall
