= Edenvale, San Jose =

Edenvale
- Neighborhood of San Jose
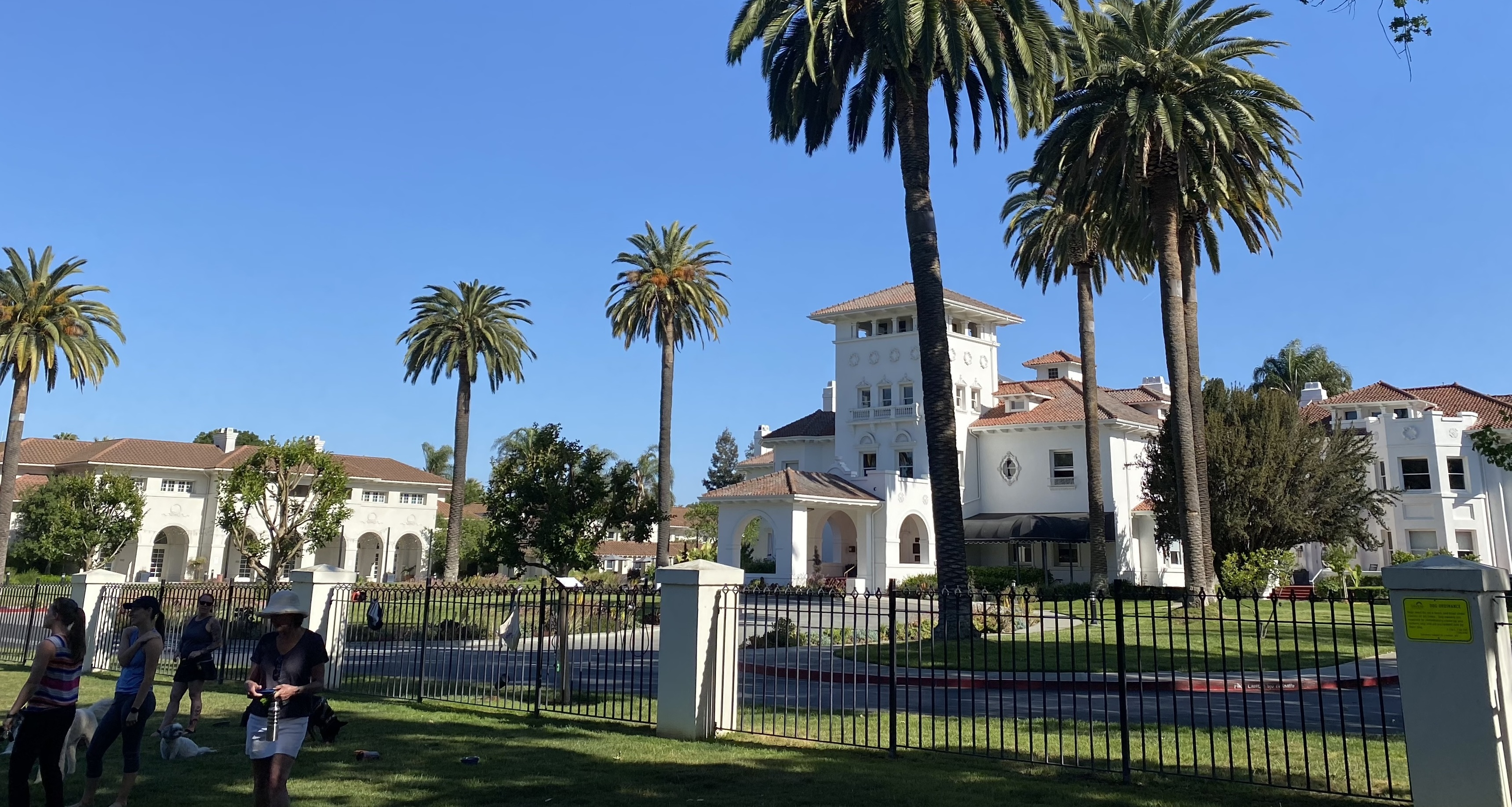
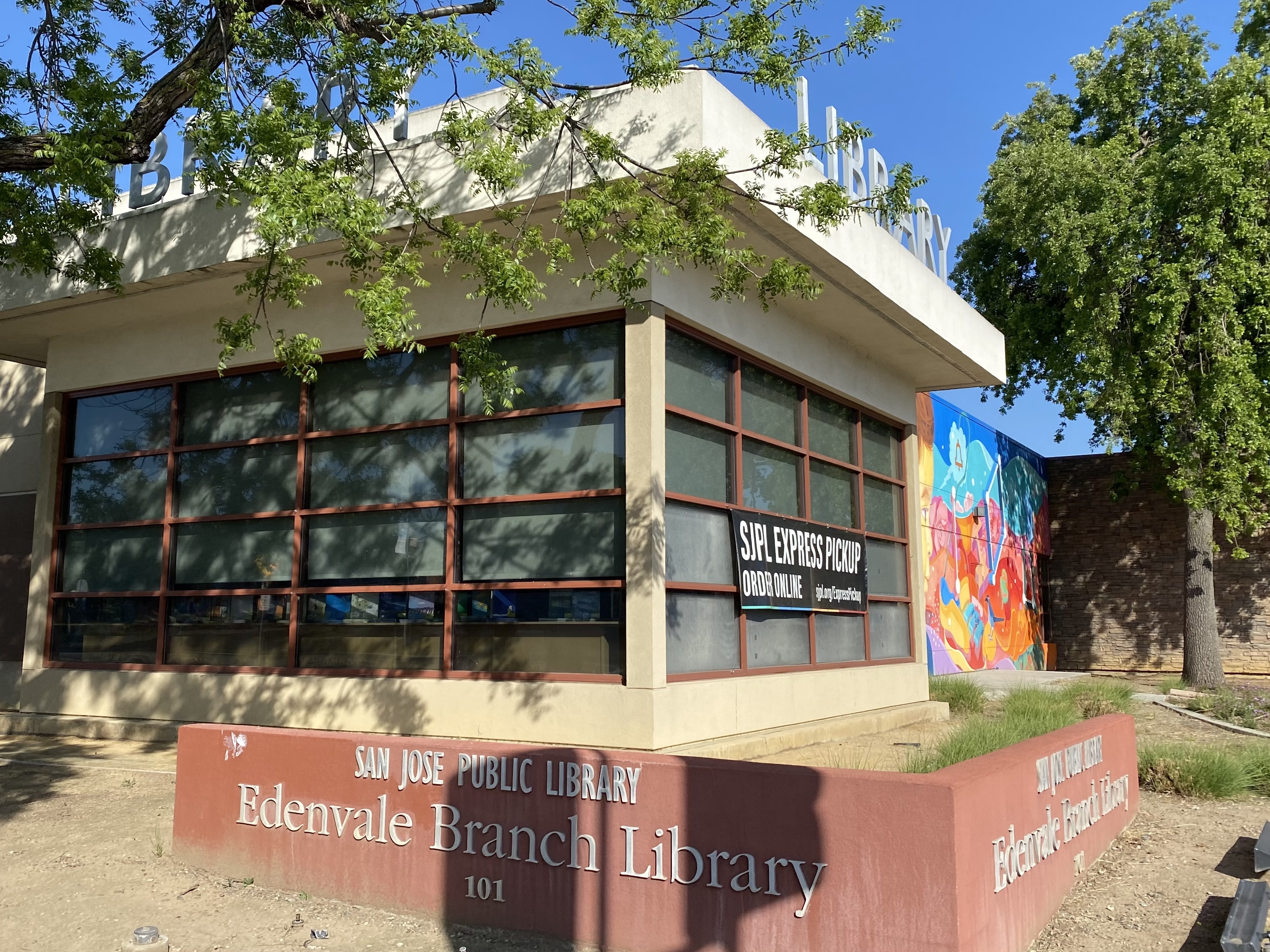
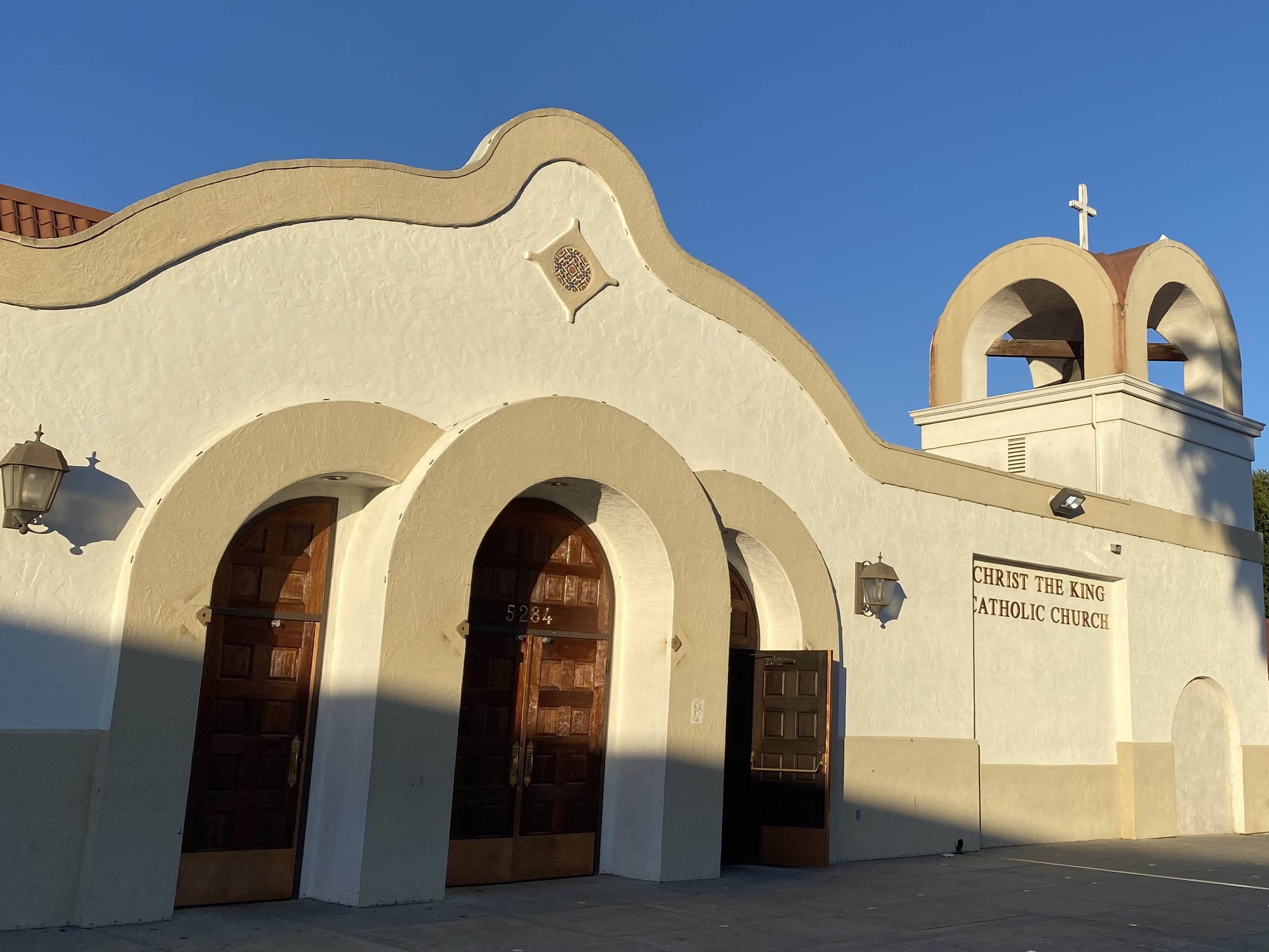
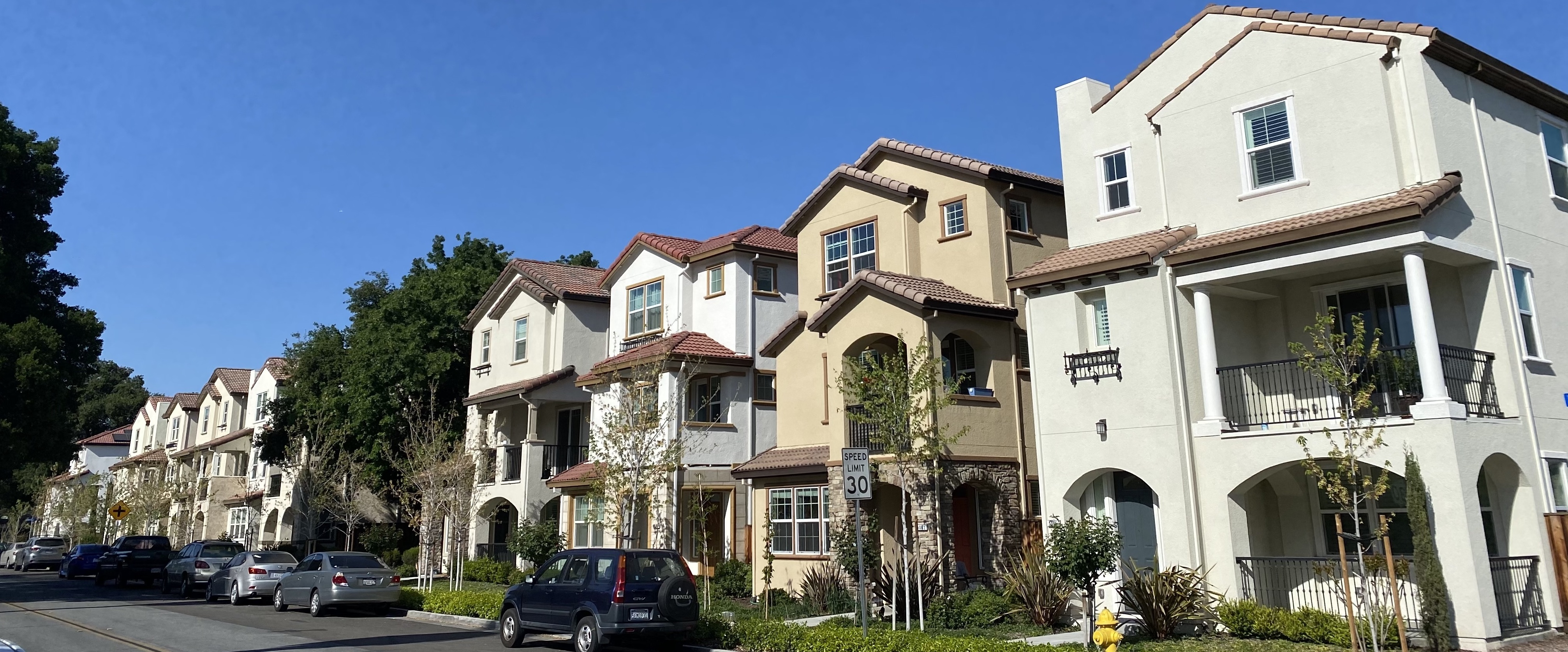
- Top: Hayes Mansion; middle: Edenvale Branch of the San José Public Library, Christ the King Church; bottom: townhomes on Edenvale Avenue.

- Location within San Jose, California
- Coordinates: 37.266084°N 121.820136°W
- Country: United States
- State: California
- County: Santa Clara
- City: San Jose
- ZIP Code: 95111, 95123, 95136
- Area code: Area code 408

Edenvale is a neighborhood of San Jose, California, in South San Jose.

== History ==
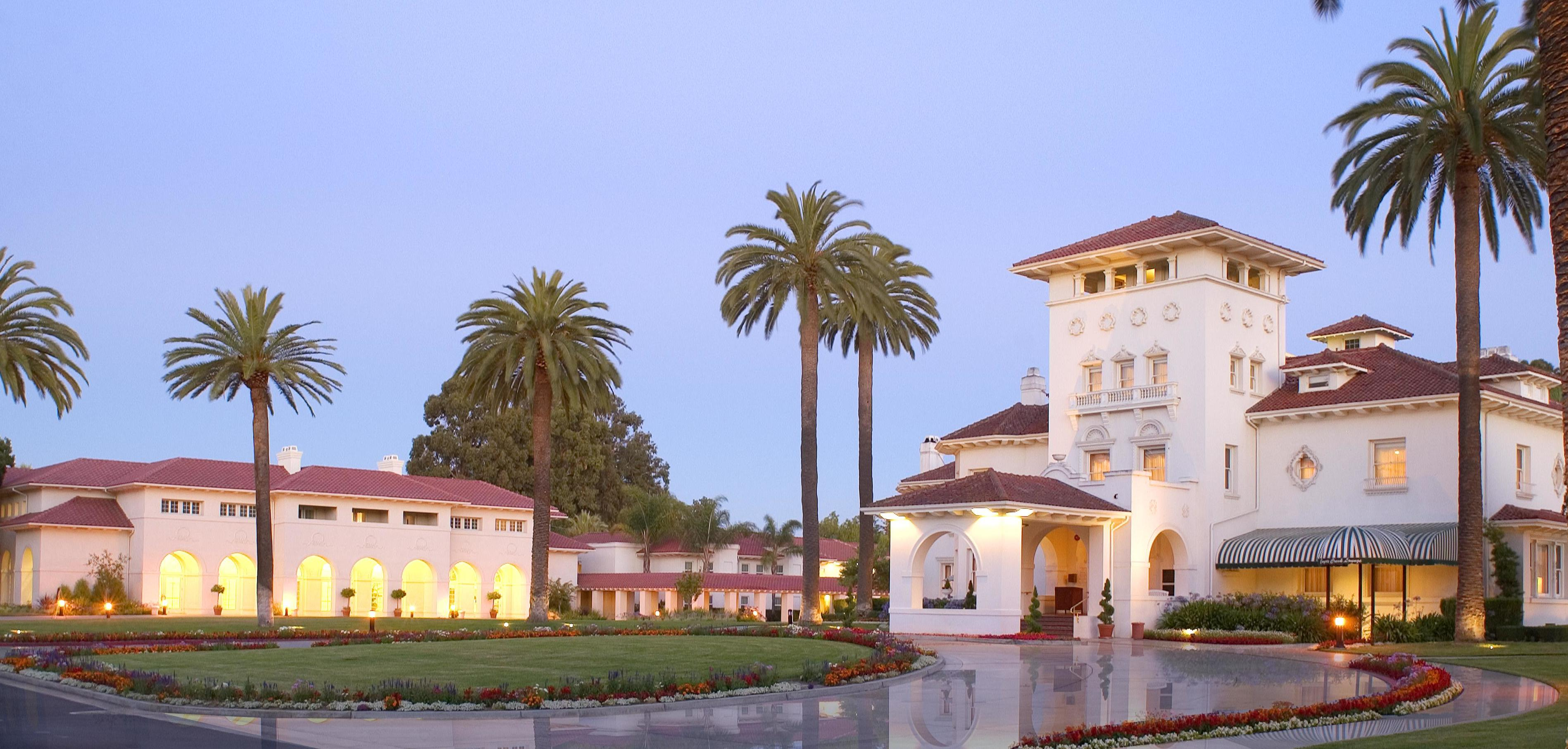
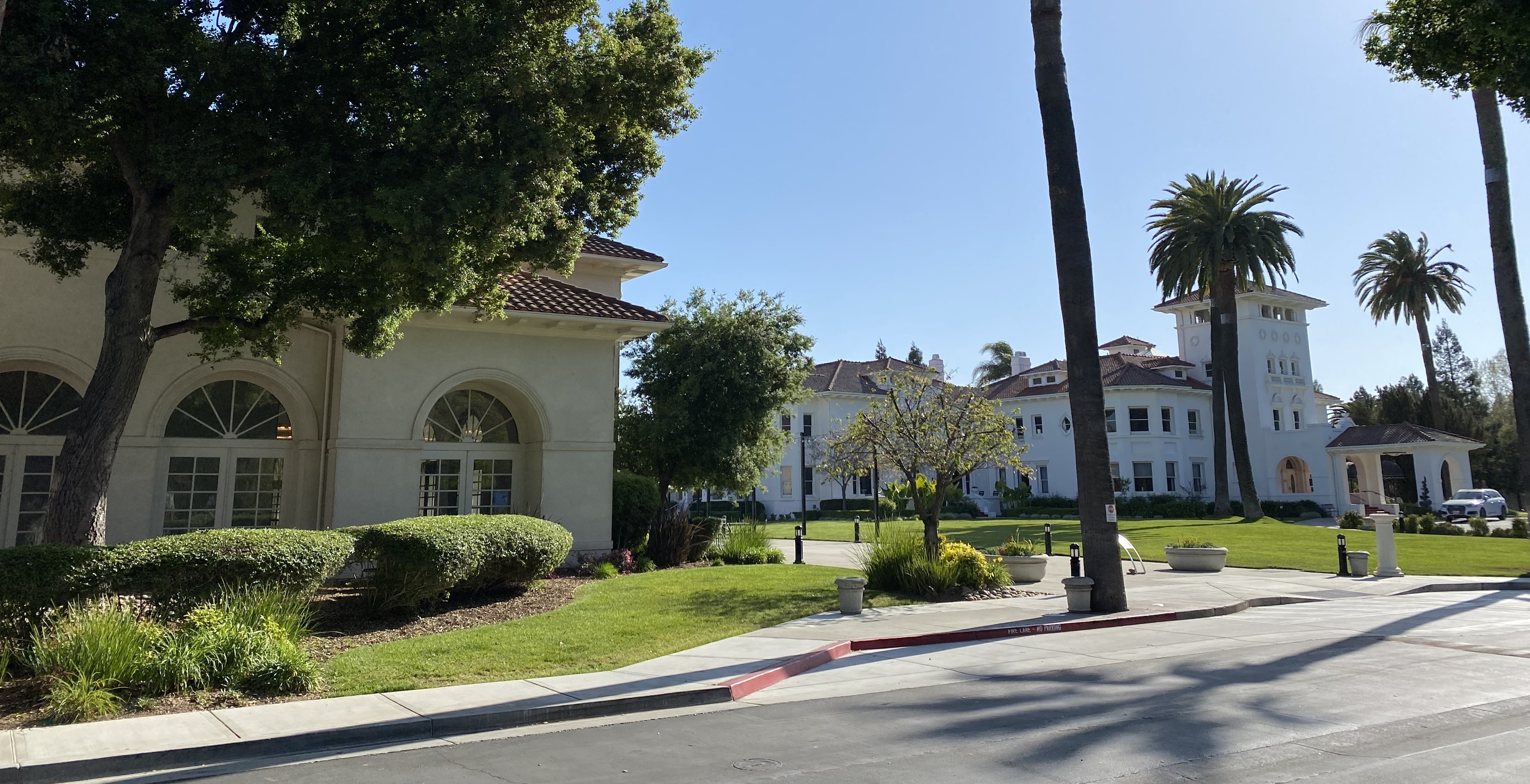
Hayes Mansion, built in 1905 by the family that founded the San Jose Mercury News, is an example of Mission Revival architecture.

Edenvale was once a town, named with reference to the Garden of Eden, because of the beauty and fertility of the place.

One of the oldest buildings in the area is Hayes Mansion. The Union Pacific Railroad and historic Monterey Road runs through the area, which is also known as El Camino Real. The railroad line carries Amtrak's "Coast Starlight."

The most popular recent history of the neighborhood includes Frontier Village, which was an amusement park operated from 1961 to 1980. Most of the land was redeveloped into residential housing.

== Geography ==
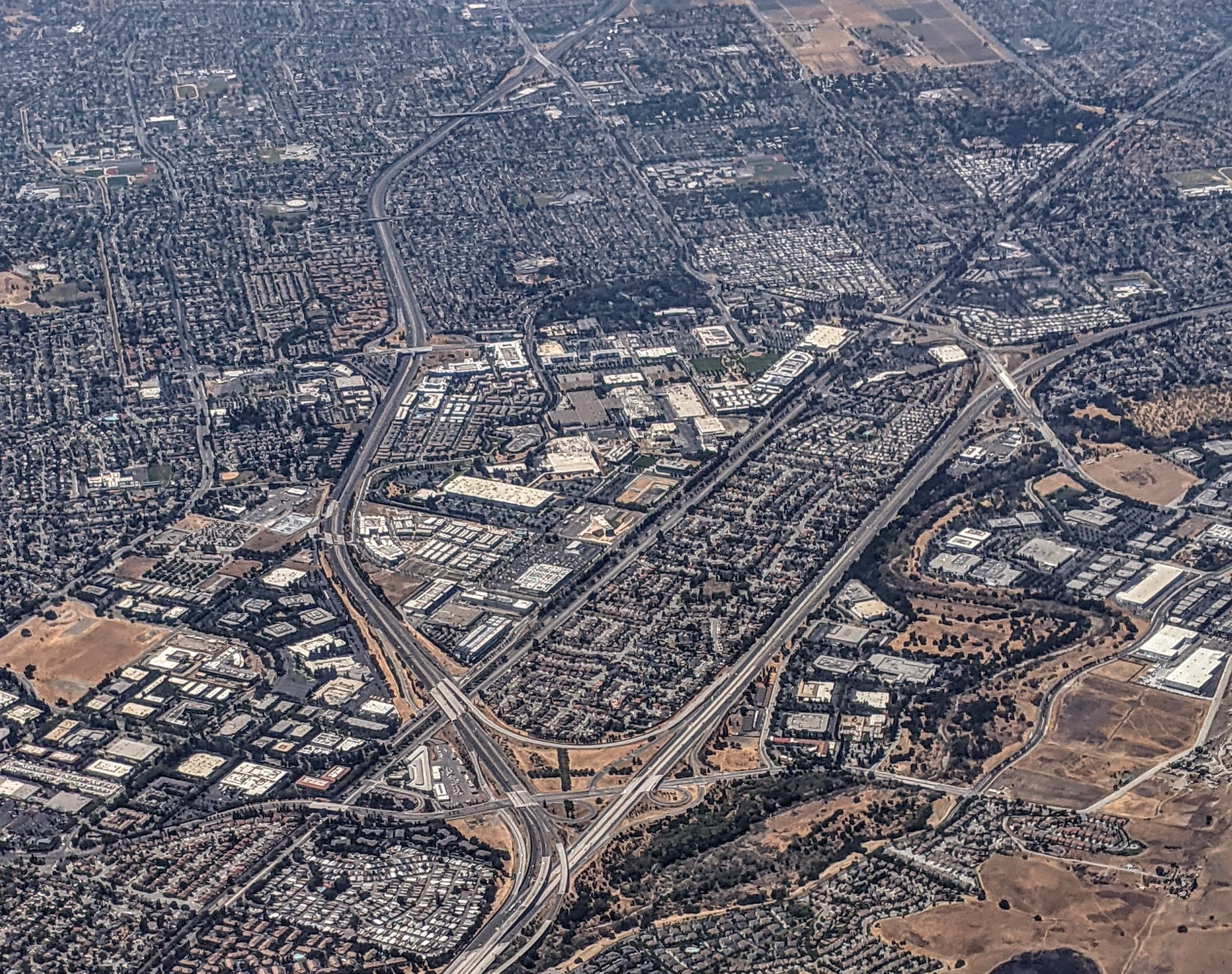
Aerial view of South San Jose, including the interchange between California State Route 85 (left) and US Highway 101 (right). Edenvale is in the top right of the image.

Edenvale is located in South San Jose. It is bound by Seven Trees to its north, Blossom Valley to its south/west, Santa Teresa to its south/east, and the Silver Creek Hills to its east.

It is one of the neighborhoods inside San Jose district 2.

== Parks ==
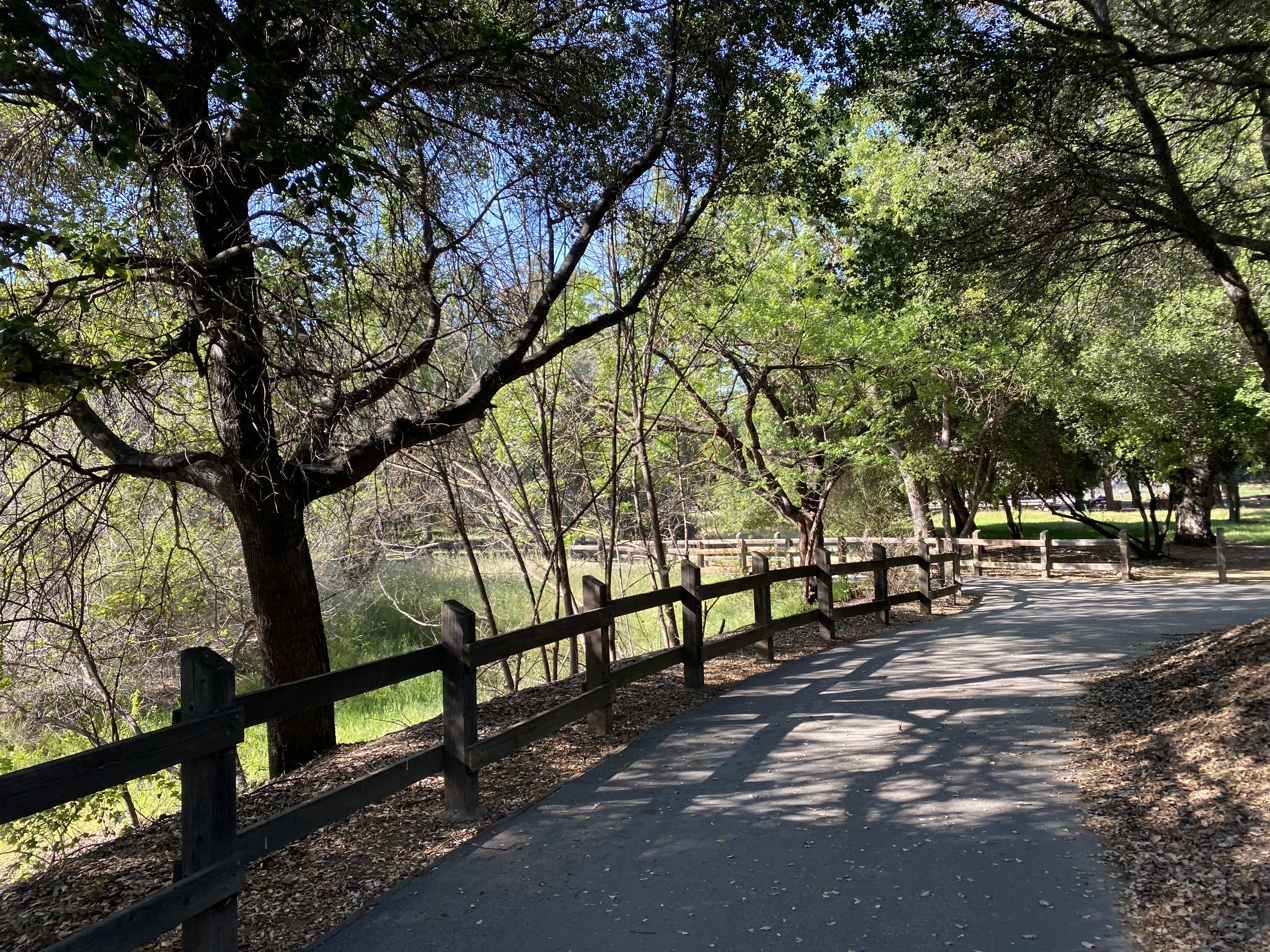
Edenvale Garden Park

Parks, libraries, and other public areas of interest include:

- Hayes Mansion
- Edenvale Garden Park
- Great Oaks Park
- Danna Rock Park
- Coyote Creek Park
- Hellyer Lake Park
- Martial Cottle Park

== Education ==
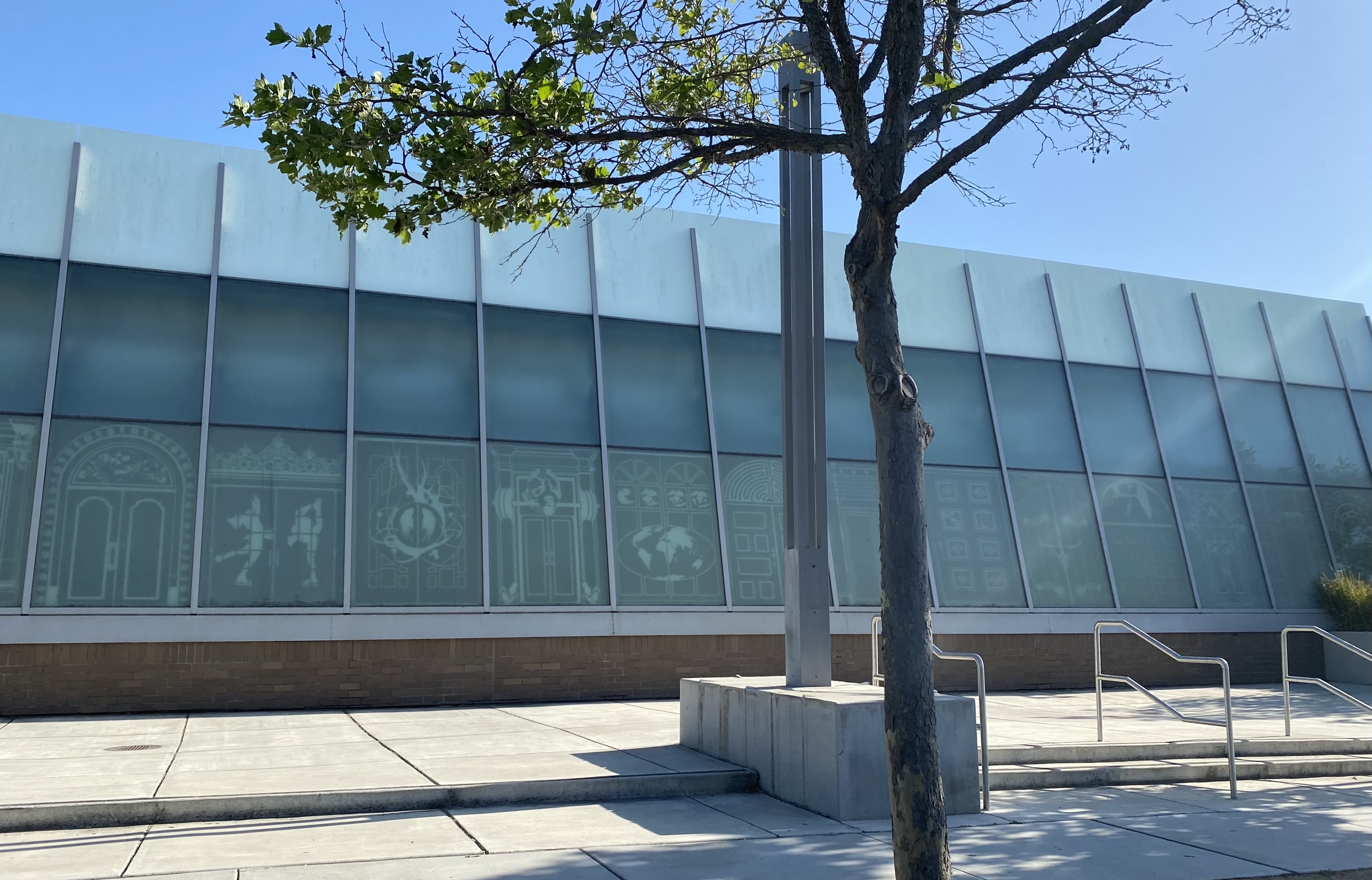
Edenvale Community Center

The following are schools located in the Edenvale area:

- Valley Christian High School
- Caroline Davis Intermediate School
- Christopher Elementary School
- Stipe Elementary School
- Edenvale Elementary School
- Hayes Elementary School
- Andrew P. Hill High School

The public schools are in the Oak Grove School District (San Jose, California) and the East Side Union High School District.
