= Valley Christian Schools (San Jose, California) =

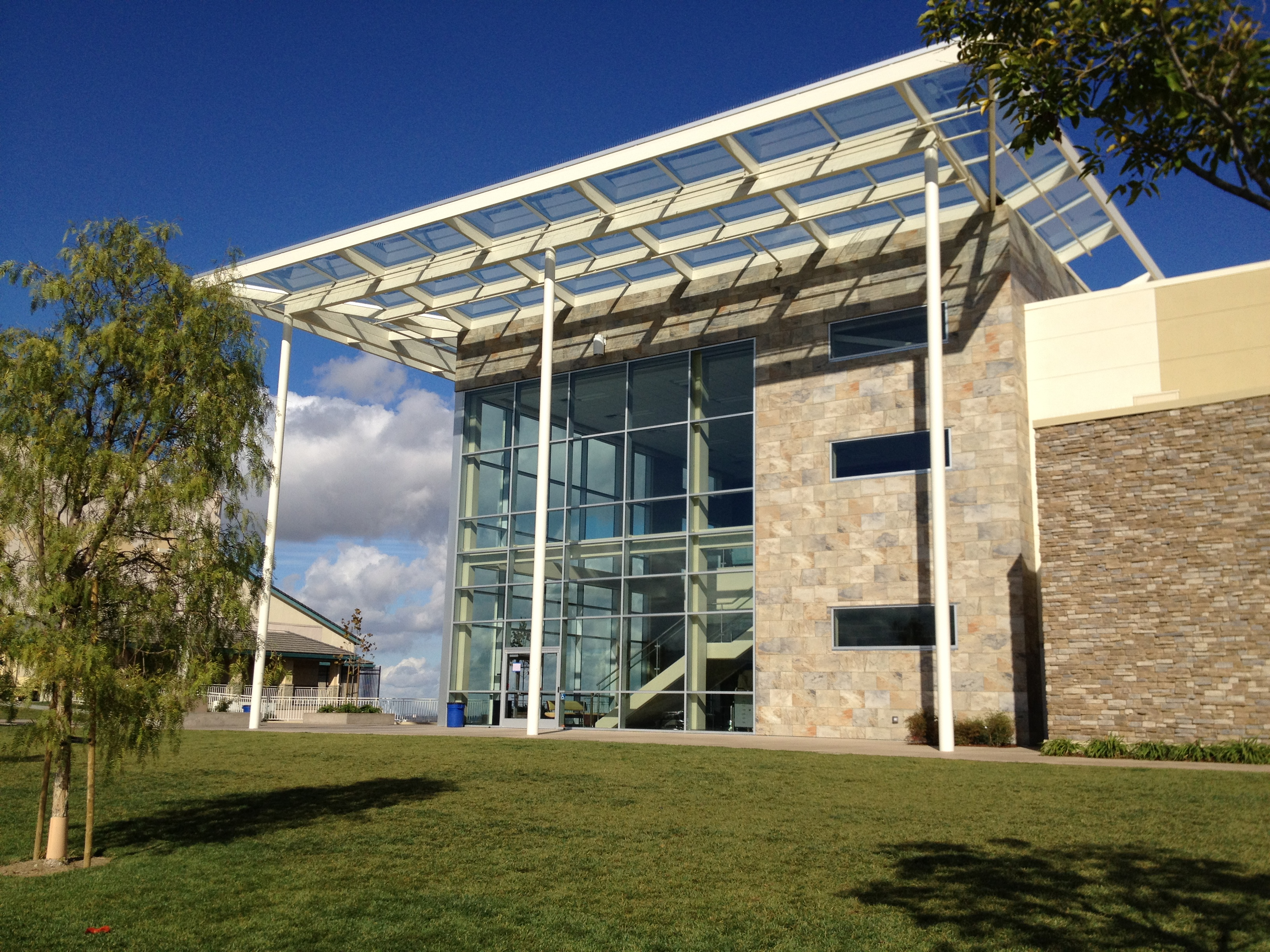

Location
- 100 Skyway Drive; San Jose, California 95111; United States; 37°16′34″N 121°49′36″W

Information
- Type: Private
- Motto: "Quest for Excellence"
- Religious affiliation: Non-denominational Christian
- Established: 1960; 66 years ago
- Principal: Jennifer Silva
- Enrollment: 1,600 (2017-2018)
- Student to teacher ratio: 16:1
- Colors: Navy Blue, Columbia Blue, and White
- Athletics conference: West Catholic Athletic League
- Mascot: Warrior
- Accreditation: Western Association of Schools and Colleges
- Tuition: US$ 33,410
- CEEB code: 053338
- Website: vcs.net

Valley Christian Schools is a Christian group of schools in San Jose, California, founded in 1960. Valley Christian's high school and middle school are located at its main campus atop San Ramon Hill in South San Jose, nestled between the Seven Trees and Edenvale neighborhoods, while its elementary school is located in Willow Glen.

== Campuses ==
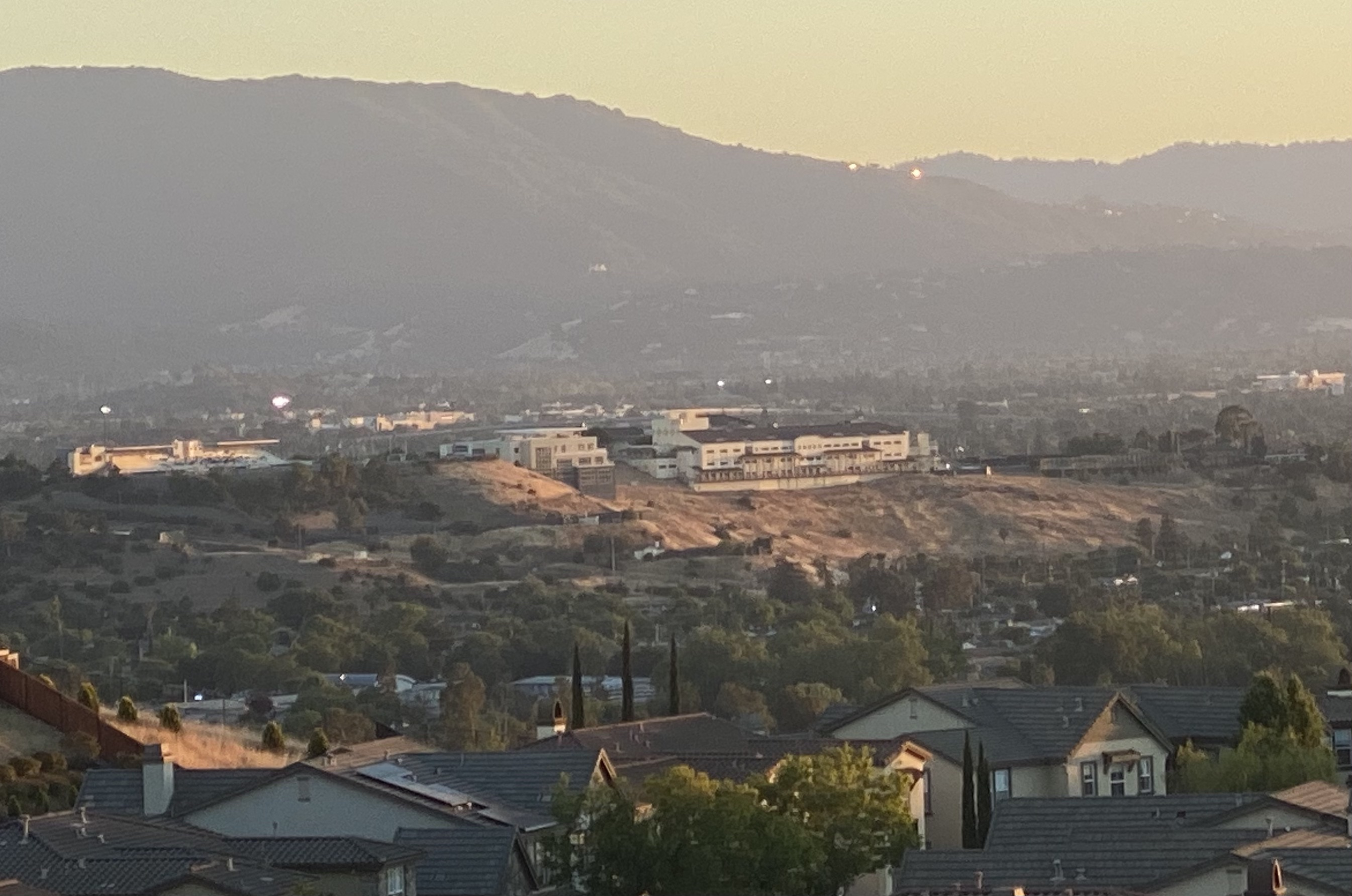
View of Valley Christian's Skyway Campus, located atop San Ramon Hill in South San Jose.

The school's primary campus, called the Skyway Campus, houses both the high and middle schools, located on top of San Ramon Hill, in South San Jose. It is located at the border of the Seven Trees and Edenvale neighborhoods. The Skyway campus is home to the endangered Dudleya setchellii succulent plant.

Valley Christian Elementary School is located in Willow Glen.

== History ==
Valley Christian School was founded in 1960 in Los Gatos, California. In the following years, it relocated to Campbell, California and then to Cambrian, San Jose in 1991, where it was housed at Branham High School.

Construction on a new masterplanned campus began in 1998, atop San Ramon Hill in South San Jose. The new campus opened in 2000.

Valley Christian opened its elementary campus on Leigh Avenue in Willow Glen, San Jose in 2003.

== Athletics ==
The Valley Christian Warriors are members of the West Catholic Athletic League, which they joined in 2003.

Season	Sports
Fall	Cross Country, Water Polo, Volleyball (girls), American football, Golf (girls), Tennis (girls), Field Hockey (girls)
Winter	Basketball, Wrestling, Soccer, Ice Hockey
Spring	Baseball, Track and Field, Golf (boys), Tennis (boys), Lacrosse (boys), Volleyball, Badminton, Swimming

== Notable alumni ==
- Aneesh Chaganty, film director and screenwriter
- Tori Dilfer, professional volleyball player
- Ariel Hsing, table tennis player
- Collin Johnson, NFL wide receiver
- Kevin Jurovich, NFL wide receiver
- Nikhil Kumar, table tennis player and Olympian
- Jacklyn Luu, synchronized swimmer (2017)
- Byron Marshall, NFL running back
- Cameron Marshall, Canadian Football League (CFL) running back
- Roger Ver, cryptocurrency proselytizer
- Brianna Visalli, professional soccer player for the Houston Dash
- Joy Williams, singer
- Chantelle Paige, singer
- JJ Heller, singer
- Sam Roush, NFL tight end for the Chicago Bears
