= Frontier Village =

Former amusement park in San Jose, California

- Frontier Village map
- Interactive map of Frontier Village
- Location: San Jose, California, USA
- Coordinates: 37°15′43″N 121°49′10″W
- Status: Defunct
- Opened: 21 October 1961
- Closed: 28 September 1980
- Theme: American frontier
- Operating season: year-round (weekends fall–spring)
- Area: 33 acres (13 ha)

Frontier Village was a 39-acre (16 ha) amusement park in San Jose, California, that operated from 1961 to September 1980. It was located at 4885 Monterey Road, at the intersection with Branham Lane. The site is now Edenvale Garden Park, next to Hayes Mansion, and was once part of the Hayes Family Estate.

== History ==
=== Development ===
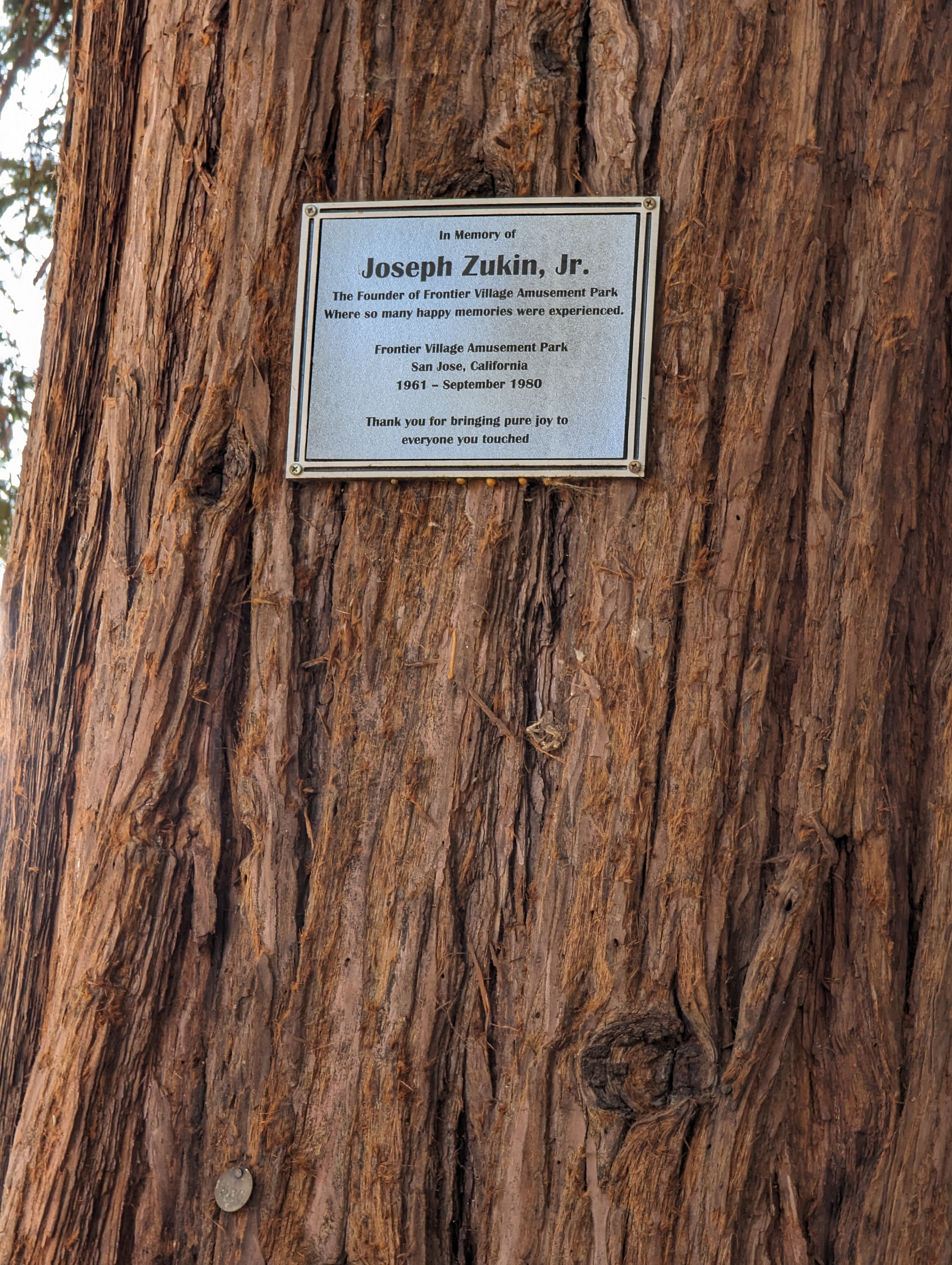
A memorial plaque at Edenvale Garden Park expresses gratitude to Zukin for Frontier Village

The park was built by Joseph Zukin Jr. of Palo Alto, who was inspired by a family trip to Disneyland in 1959. In 1958, Zukin sold 110,000 shares in the Frontier Village corporation at $5 per share. Additional funds were raised by selling 400,000 shares of stock at US$5 (equivalent to $50 in 2025) each, of which nearly 80,000 shares were sold by October 1960, helped by a "substantial, but not controlling block" purchased by United California Theaters.

The park was planned initially to be built along El Camino Real in Sunnyvale, California, according to plans drawn up in 1958 by the Frontier Village Corporation, founded by Zukin, Hawley Smith, and Michael Khourie. Zukin declared "it will be designed as a children's dream of the Old West, where the child (and his parents) can actually experience the thrills and excitement of the West in an atmosphere especially created for fun and relaxation." Zukin later announced in April 1959 that Frontier Village would be built in San Jose, on Hayes Ranch, part of the estate surrounding Hayes Mansion.

Initial design was performed by Paul Murphy, who also had a full-time job at Santa Clara University as director of publications. After Murphy found himself too busy to continue, responsibility for the design was turned over to Laurence Hollings, who had prior experience designing film sets at Columbia Pictures and Paramount Pictures, and nature habitats at the California Academy of Sciences. He described the park as a "sort of tongue-in-cheek approach to the Wild West." For publicity, a touring western-themed show named "Frontier Days" visited local shopping centers in late spring 1960, including Valley Fair in San Jose and Bay Fair in San Leandro.

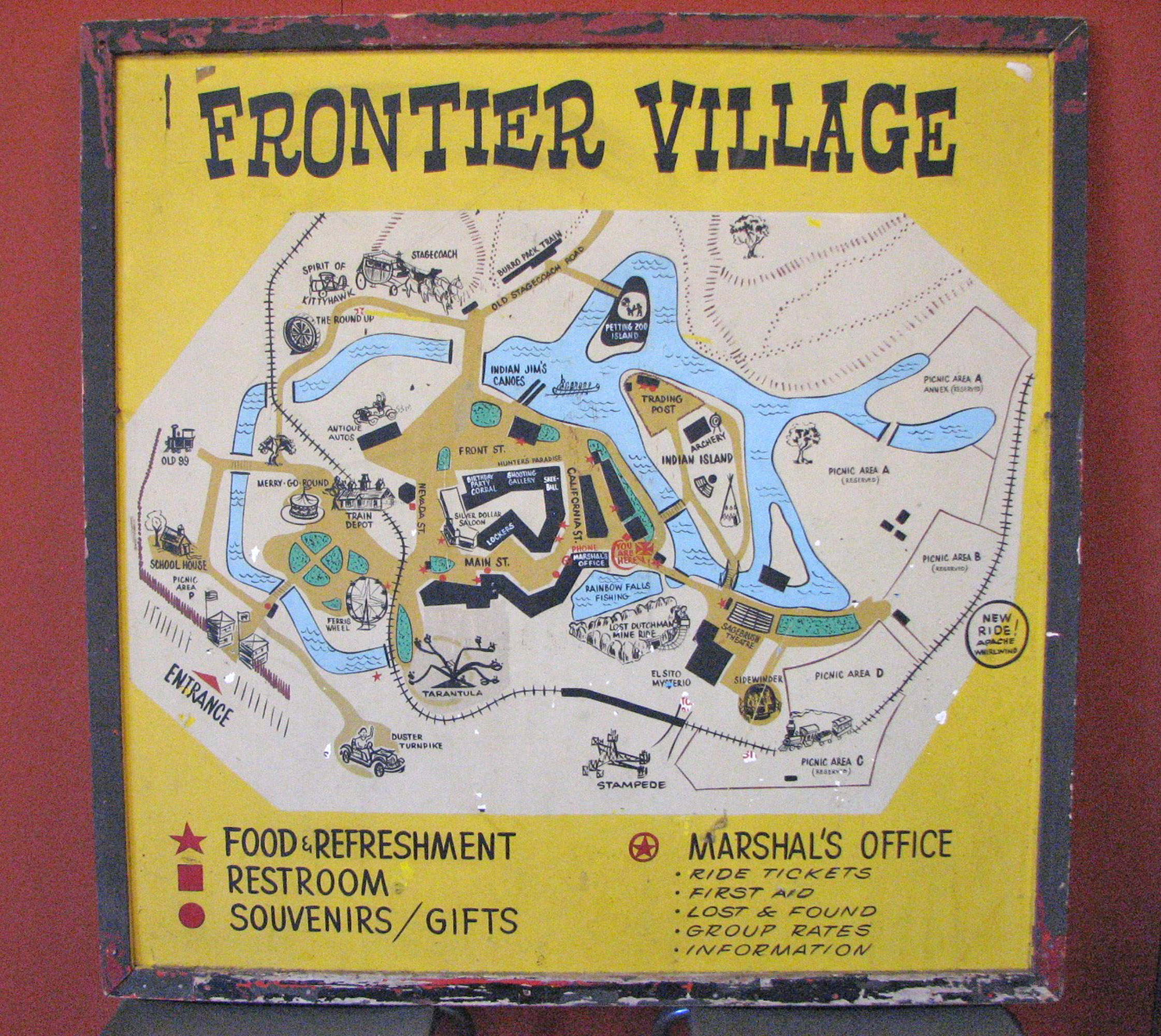
Map of Frontier Village, printed on a sign originally posted by the "Marshal's Office".

Ground was broken for the park on August 1, 1960.

=== Operation ===
The park, developed at a cost of $2 million, opened on October 21, 1961, surrounded by a barricade of logs, and was themed to the Old West. Admission was $0.90 for adults, $0.45 for children (older than 12), and free (for children under 12). The initial public mascot of the park was an unnamed "Deputy Marshal" who greeted guests and saved them from dangerous outlaws in daily mock shootouts staged every hour at the park's Main Street. The actors were equipped with actual firearms (Colt Single Action Army revolvers and double-barrel shotguns) firing blanks filled with black powder. To better retain the water in an artificial canal for the Indian Canoe ride, the canal was lined with cement. The park was open year-round, operating on weekends only during the off-season (fall to spring). More than one million people visited the park in its first three years of operation.

The 1964 summer season opened on Saturday, June 20, marked by a "Family Fun Day". Frontier Village was praised as "spotless, rarely jammed ... one can take in all of the rides and attractions within about four hours." Jim Bakich, a first-year student at San Jose City College, attempted to set a world's record for the longest continuous Ferris wheel ride in 1965, planning to spend two full weeks aboard the park's wheel. Other self-claimed world records set at the park in 1966 include the finish of the longest foot-propelled scooter journey – (114 mi (183 km) from Big Sur, by Byron Jones – and largest pizza – 4 1/2 ft (1.4 m) in diameter. Dennis the Menace visited the park with his parents in the story "The Park Lark", initially published for the March 1970 issue; while there, he interacted with the marshal, an outlaw, other guests, and visited several attractions, including the Rainbow Falls trout fishing pond and the Antique Cars ride.

A short film entitled Kung-Phooey was filmed in part at Frontier Village in 1975; it was written and produced for less than $100 by a group of 29 elementary school students from San Francisco under the instruction of Darrell Sevilla. It won first prize at the National Educational Television Young Filmmakers' Festival.

In 1977, Charles Jacques rated the park as the 45th best in the United States, behind local competitors Marriott's Great America (#12) and Santa Cruz Beach Boardwalk (#30). It was also the first year of operation for the Apache Whirlwind, the park's first and only roller coaster. Jeff Block and Rena Clark set a new record for Ferris wheel endurance starting on July 1, 1978, traveling 353.93 mi (569.60 km) on the park's wheel in 29,744 revolutions over 37 days. Block broke the record once more in 1993 with a 38-day ride on the same Ferris wheel, which had been relocated to the Orange County Fair after Frontier Village's closure.

The first costumed character, a bear named Theodore, was introduced to the park in July 1972; he was joined by a prospector named Tumbleweed in 1974 and Kactus Kong in 1977. The homegrown mascots were replaced by six characters from Hanna-Barbera cartoons in 1979: Yogi Bear, Quick Draw McGraw, Jabberjaw, Scooby-Doo, Fred Flintstone, and Huckleberry Hound.

=== Closure ===
The Last Roundup poster, a poster representing all of the classic Hanna-Barbera characters leaving the village (the closure and abandonment of the park).

When the park opened in 1961, it was surrounded by undeveloped land. A decade later, the remainder of the substantial Hayes ranch had been sold off piecemeal and the park was surrounded by urban sprawl; Zukin lacked the necessary funds to expand and sold Frontier Village to Rio Grande Industries for US$1.7 million in 1973, although he stayed on to manage the park through 1977.

Rio Grande announced plans in 1977 to expand the park to 101 acres (41 ha) onto the former site of the drive-in theater at a cost of $10 million, including on-site restaurants and concessions; however, those plans were denied by the San Jose City Council, unless the park also funded $1.8 million for traffic improvements. According to Zukin, the protests and opposition from the park's new residential neighbors, who complained about the noise and fought development plans, led Rio Grande to drop the expansion. Due to lawsuits from nearby homeowners, lower-than-expected park revenues, competition from Marriott's Great America, and rising San Jose land values, Rio Grande could make more money selling off the land to developers than it could by running the park.

In 1980, the undeveloped land and Frontier Village were sold to a land developer, the Bren Company. Despite a petition drive that collected 10,000 signatures by September 19, 1980, which would have declared the site a historical landmark, Rio Grande announced the park would be closed. During its final days, it held a special event titled "The Last Roundup", attracting 30,000 visitors per day. Television advertisements publicizing the last days included a stagecoach ride and a prisoner lamenting that he would miss the park's closing. The park closed on September 28, 1980. The Bren Company held a public auction in October 1980, disposing of all the rides, buildings, and lumber that made up Frontier Village.

== Legacy ==
Frontier Village after closure

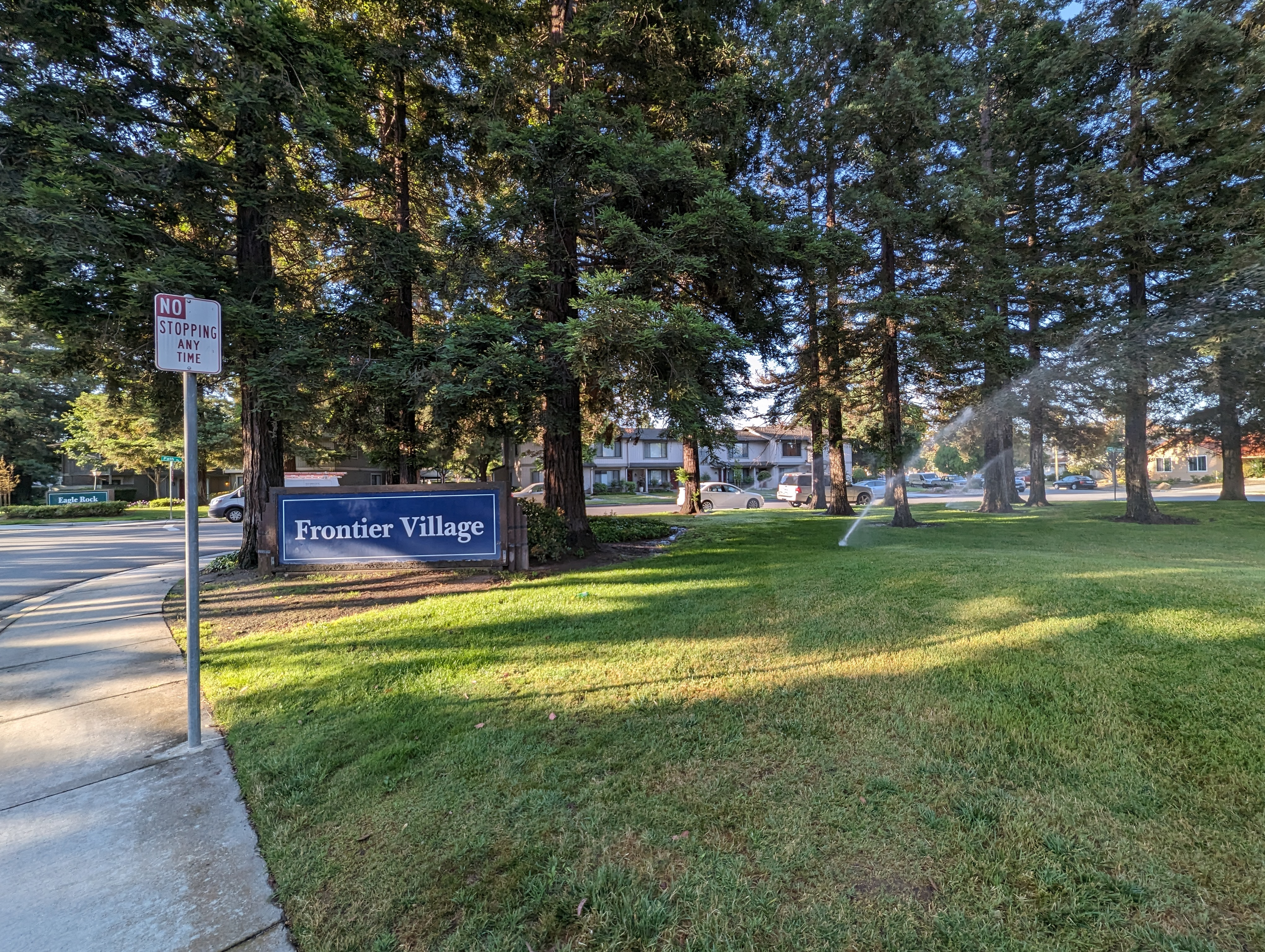
Sign for Frontier Village residential development

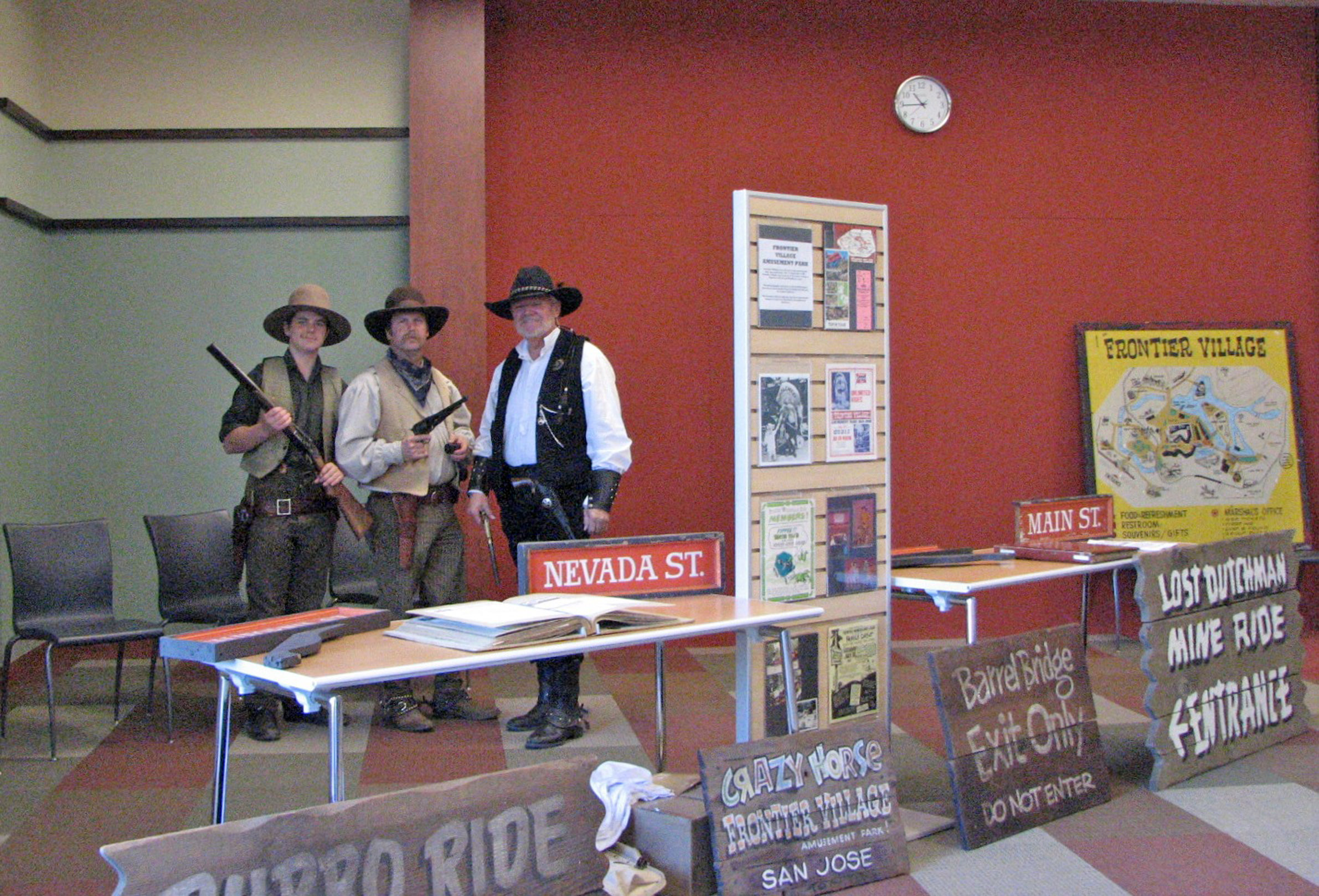
Shaughnessy McGehee (center) with fellow Fall Guys among memorabilia from the park, displayed at the Edenvale branch of the San Jose Public Library

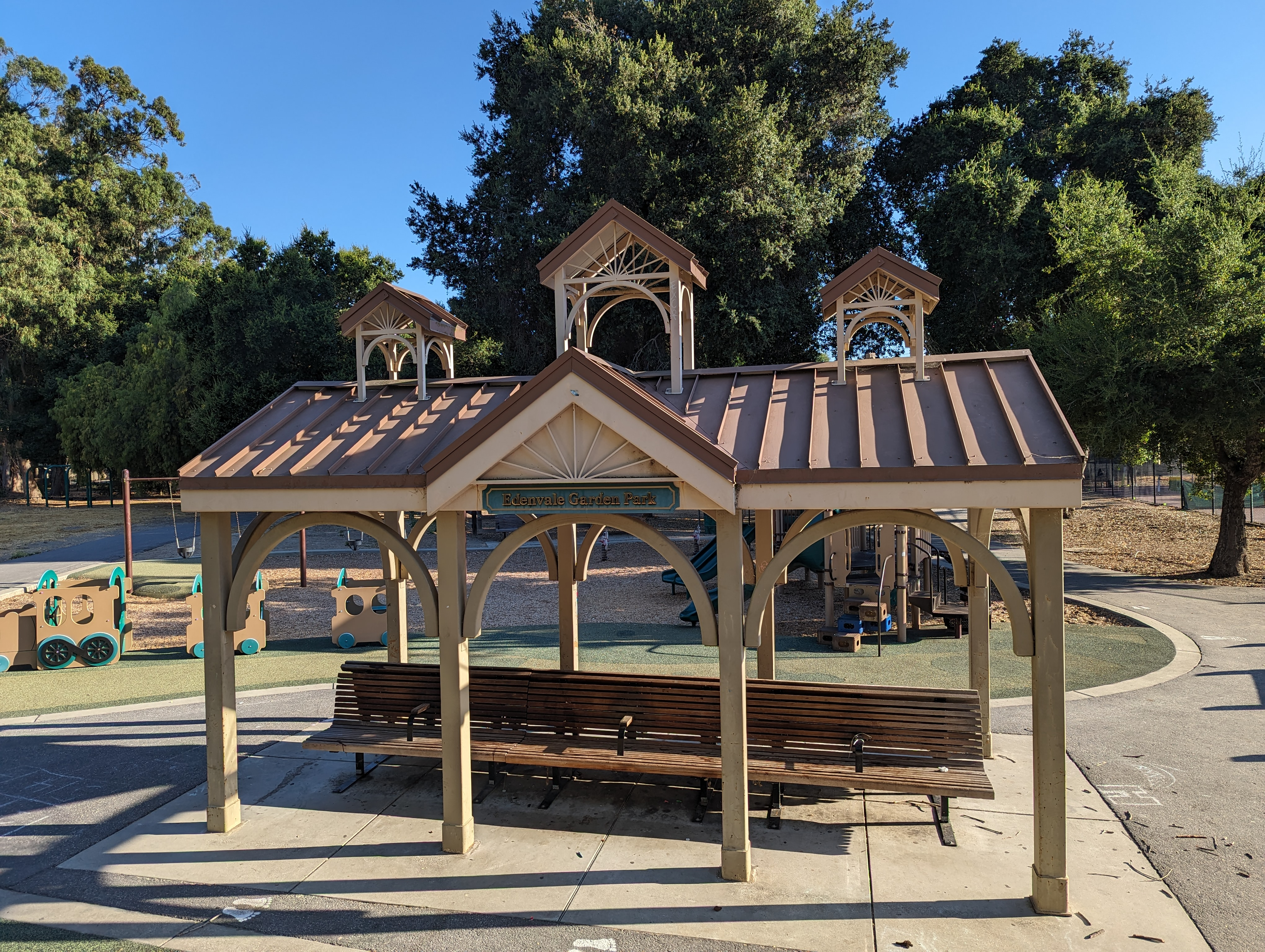
Railroad station-themed shelter at Edenvale Garden Park

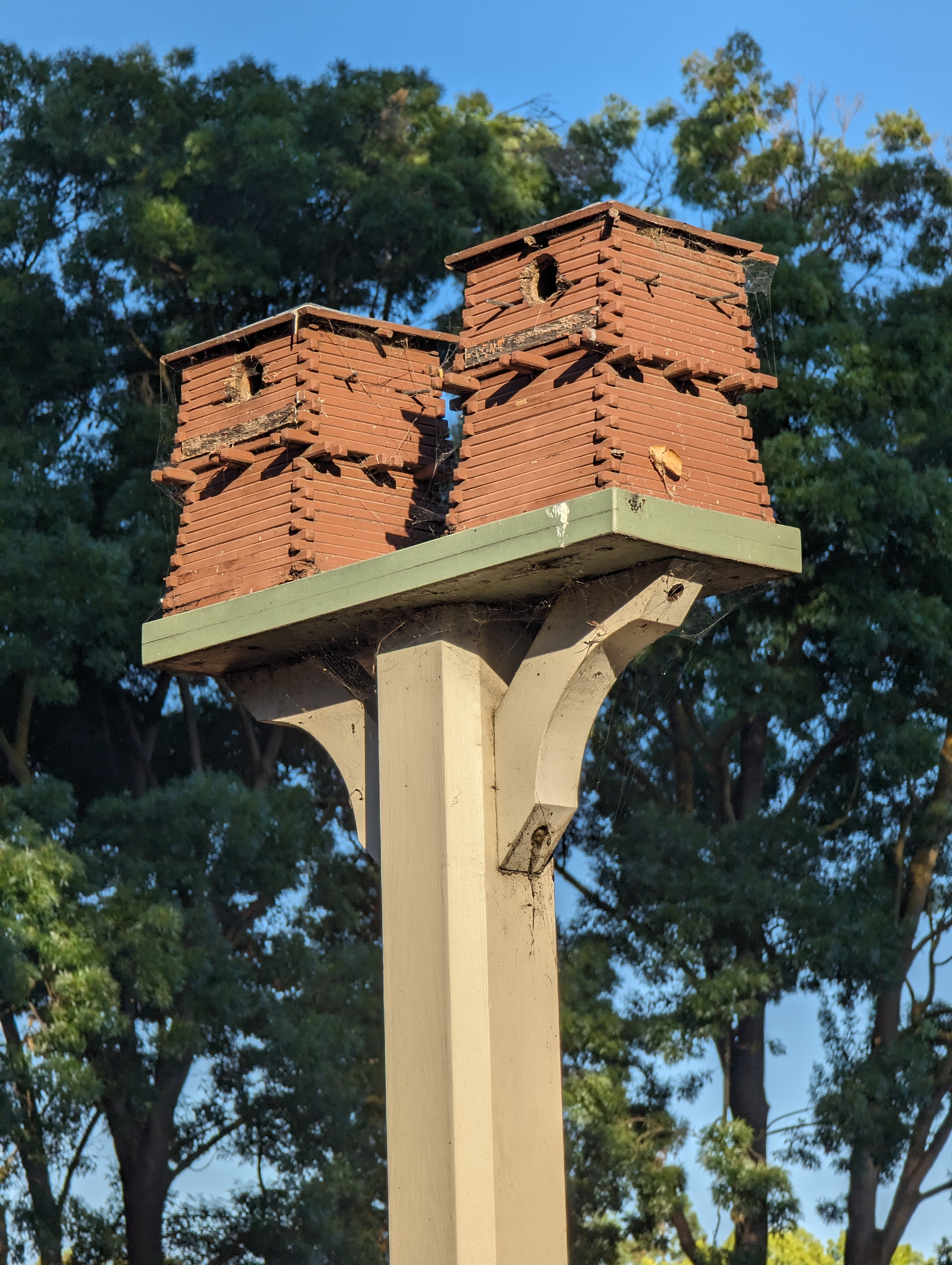
Entrance towers model/birdhouse by Vince Duke

Bren built a residential development just west of present-day Edenvale Garden Park on the site of the planned expansion; the condominium complex is named "Frontier Village".

All the buildings were removed from the amusement park and San Jose's Edenvale Garden Park now exists at the former location of the amusement park. Items such as concrete boulders from the artificial river remain half-buried. In April 2008, artist Jon Rubin installed the Frontier Village Birdhouses, five scale models of Frontier Village buildings and landmarks placed where the original structures were during the park's operating period. Each of the five scale buildings (Railroad Station; Main Entrance Log Towers; Mine Ride; Old School House; Main Street) is a functioning birdhouse and were built by Vince Duke. The present-day Edenvale Garden Park has play structures themed for the amusement park's railroad.

Some signage and ride vehicles have remained in the hands of private collectors, while other vehicles were stored at the nearby Happy Hollow Park & Zoo, to be sold later in 1980 at auction. Two fans started a website to gather history, photographs, and testimonials in 2000. Since 2001, former employees and fans have held a reunion each summer at Edenvale Garden Park to reminisce about the amusement park and a group calling themselves the "Fall Guys" re-enact the park's gunbattles; the reunions were started by Mat Lindstedt. Shaughnessy McGehee of Campbell, California, built a miniature version of the park in his own backyard over two decades. He built miniature versions of the Silver Dollar Saloon, General's Store, and Schoolhouse. McGehee also collected Frontier Village memorabilia, including the Crazy Horse, three of the eight Antique Autos (with his most prized being the Yellow Maxwell), the Frontier Village lettering from the front entrance of the park, and the original Silver Dollar Saloon doors. The replica closed in 2015, after McGehee sold his house and moved to Oregon.

Frontier Village's 2 ft 6 in (762 mm) narrow gauge train, originally built by Arrow Development, was bought in 1981 by Jerry Burke, who made it the central focus of his 10-acre themed 1880 Western themed Burke Junction shopping center in Cameron Park, approximately 30 mi (48 km) east of Sacramento. It was abandoned in 2000 after Burke sold the property and did not run again until the Glasser family purchased the shopping center in 2008; they spent $150,000 rehabilitating the train and announced in June 2010 the train would resume service; the inaugural run was on August 21. On January 8, 2018, the Burke Junction train collided with a minivan; although there were no injuries, the train was damaged, requiring extensive repairs.

The "It Takes a Village" exhibit featuring Frontier Village was held at the New Museum Los Gatos in 2015; artifacts and memorabilia were shown alongside similar ephemera from defunct local amusement parks, including Santa's Village (Scotts Valley) and The Lost World.

Frontier Village is the subject of an eponymous song by singer-songwriters Jeff Larson and Jeffrey Foskett, released as part of the 2018 album ʻElua Aloha.

== Rides and Attractions ==
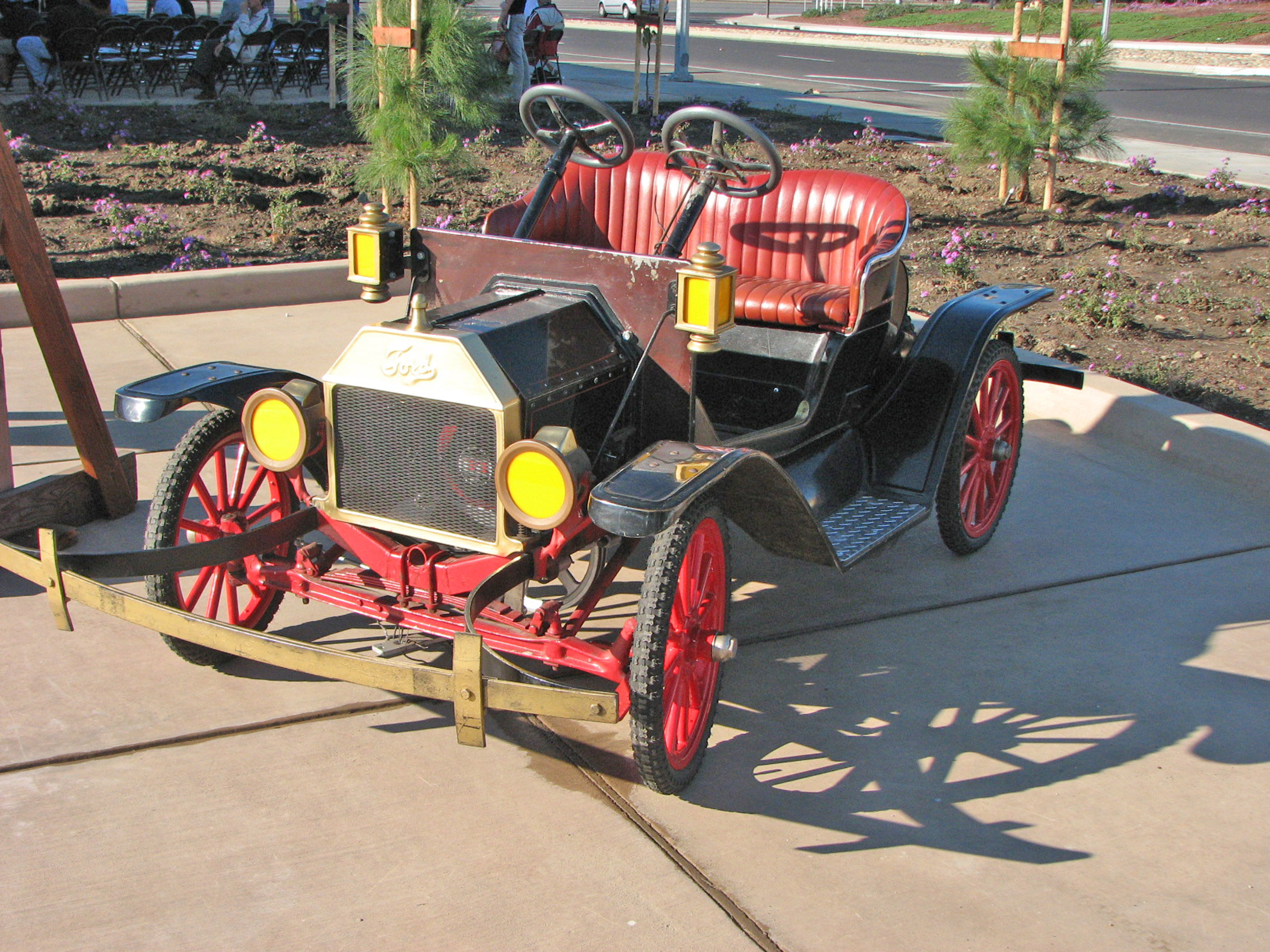
A car from the Antique Autos ride

As originally constructed, the 33-acre (13 ha) park was divided into the 10-acre (4.0 ha) amusement area and 5-acre (2.0 ha) parking lot; the remaining 13 acres (5.3 ha) were reserved for expansion. The park was laid out with a central square and a perimeter railroad that traversed bridges and canyons; the square included an Old West village with a stage for live performances.

=== Rides ===
Rides at Frontier Village
Name	Mfr.	Model / Type	Installed	Removed	Notes
Antique Autos	Arrow Development	Antique Car Ride	1961	1980	Originally "Horseless Carriage Ride". Vehicles were scale models of Ford Model T and Maxwell automobiles, driven by an electric motor drawing power from guide rail.
Apache Whirlwind	Mack Rides	Blauer Enzian (powered coaster)	1977	1980	Purchased for $599,292.23 on December 31, 1976. Last thrill ride at the park.
Burro Pack Train	—N/a	Passenger animal team	1961	1980	Originally "Burro Ride". Train of small donkeys that carried passengers.
Duster-Turnpike	Arrow Development	Antique Car Ride	1975	1980	Added due to popularity of Antique Autos, using gasoline-powered "Arrow Flyer" vehicles.
Ferris Wheel	Eli Bridge	"Big Eli" Ferris Wheel	1965	1980	12 seats, 42 ft (13 m) tall. Sold to Santa's Village (Sky Forest) in 1980 after park's closure.
Frontier Village Railroad	Arrow Development	2 ft 6 in (762 mm) narrow gauge miniature railroad	1961	1980	Original script was narrated by engineer "Casey Jones" for the Frontier Village & Southern Pacific Railroad (later changed to Rio Grande after 1973). One train is in operation at Burke Junction Shopping Center in Cameron Park, California. Uses automobile drivetrain (engine and transmission from a Chevrolet Corvair).
Indian Jim's Canoes	Old Town Canoe Company	Canoe Ride	1961	1980	Originally "Indian War Canoe Ride" and "Indian Jim's War Canoes". Paddled by guests.
Lost Dutchman Mine Ride	Arrow Development	Dark ride	1961	1980	Originally the "Lost Frontier Mine Ride".
Merry-Go-Round	Herschell	Carousel	1961	1980	Originally built c. 1923 and installed at Frontier Village as "Carousel". Sold to Santa's Village (Sky Forest) in 1980 after park's closure. Purchased at auction by a private collector in 1997 after Santa's Village closed.
Old 99 Train Ride	Bradley & Kaye	Kiddie Train Ride	1968	1980	Sold to Happy Hollow Zoo after park's closure.
The Round Up	Hrubetz	Round Up	1972	1980	Began operation in 1972. Decorated with bull heads.
Sidewinder	Sellner	Tilt-A-Whirl	1968	1980	Installed for 1968 season.
Spirit of Kitty Hawk	Bisch-Rocco	Flying Scooters	1971	1980	Purchased from Santa Cruz Beach Boardwalk. Themed with World War I-era tail art.
Stagecoach	Dells Fargo Company	Horse-drawn stagecoach	1961	1980	Originally "Wild Country".
Stampede	Eli Bridge	Scrambler	1966	1975	Installed in 1966; removed for Tarantula in 1975. Originally "Wild Stampede".
Tarantula	Eyerly	Monster	1975	1980	

=== Attractions ===
- California Street (Dapper Dan's, Last Chance Casino, Shoe & Spike)
- El Sito Mysterio
- Front Street (Birthday Party Corral, Games, Hunter's Paradise Shooting Gallery, Ice Cream Gazebo, Skeeball)
- Indian Island (Archery, Fort Far West, Indian Island Stage)
- Main Street (Arcade, Cantina Murieta, Gunfights, Indian Goods, Marshal's Office, Picture Palace, Silver Dollar Saloon, Sweet Shop, Trading Post)
- Nevada Street
- Petting Zoo Island (opened 1969)
- Reserved Company Picnics
- Rainbow Falls Trout Fishing (measured 120 ft × 45 ft × 12 ft (36.6 m × 13.7 m × 3.7 m); stocked with 10,000 rainbow trout)
- Sagebrush Theatre
- School House Museum
- Frontier Auto Movie (behind the park on the southwest side) access was through the parking lot for the village. Drive in movie theater open all year round.

== See also ==
- American Old West
- List of defunct amusement parks
