= Edenvale Gardens Regional Park =

Park in San Jose, California, United States

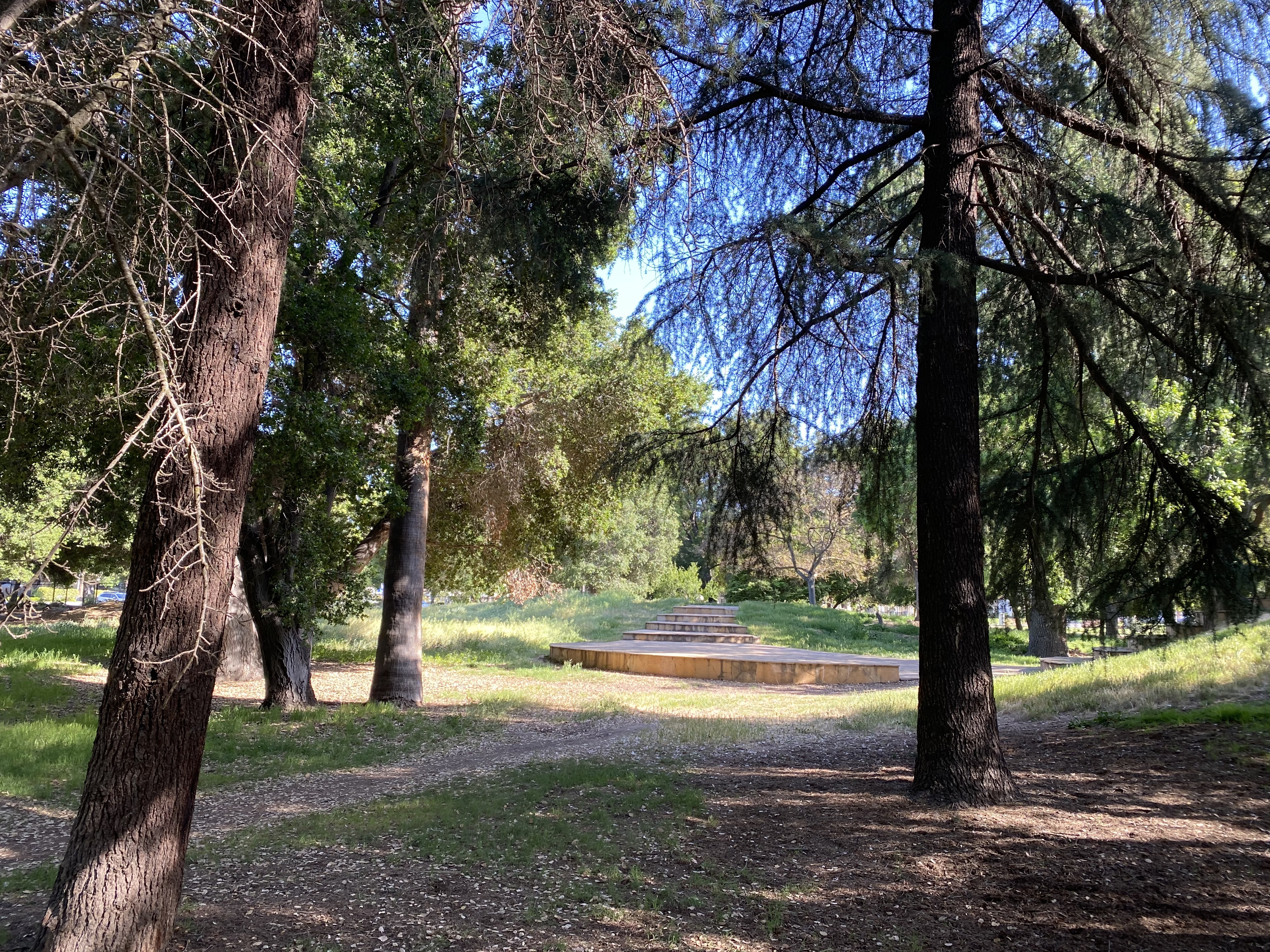
- Hiking trails in the park
- Interactive map of Edenvale Gardens Regional Park
- Nearest city: San Jose, California
- Coordinates: 37.265°N 121.821°W
- Area: 19.5 acres (7.9 ha)
- Created: 1987
- Operator: City of San Jose
- Open: 8 a.m. to 1 hr after sunset
- Parking: parking lot
- Public transit: VTA 68, 568

Edenvale Gardens Regional Park (originally Edenvale Garden Park) is a city park in San Jose, California, occupying 19.5 acres (7.9 ha) in the Edenvale neighborhood. The site originally was developed by Rudolph Ulrich as the 40-acre (16 ha) formal park adjoining Hayes Mansion starting from approximately 1887. In 1954, the mansion and property was sold; the site next was used for the Frontier Village amusement park between 1961 and 1980, and when that park closed, approximately half the land was redeveloped into housing, with the rest preserved as the present-day city park after San Jose purchased the remaining land in 1987.

== Site ==
Edenvale Garden Park is bounded by Saddlebrook Drive (to the north), Edenvale Avenue (to the east), the Hayes Mansion complex (to the south), and residential development (to the west). The developed area encompasses 18.76 acres (7.59 ha), making it one of the largest parks in the San Jose park system.

== History ==
Mary Hayes Chynoweth (born Mary Folsom, 1825), famed for being a spiritualist and healer, married Anson Hayes in 1854 and the family first visited California in 1872, staying in what would become Hayward with distant relatives. Anson died in 1873, and Mary later had a vision in 1882 telling her where a vast, undeveloped iron ore deposit was near what is now Ironwood, Michigan; the Hayes family invested in the Ashland and Germania iron mines in the Gogebic Range and won their fortune by 1885.

In 1887, tiring of the bucolic mining town atmosphere, Mary made plans to move to California, purchasing approximately 449 acres (182 ha) of farmland and a house from the Tennant family near the Edenvale station of the Southern Pacific Railroad, resettling there by November of that year. Mary was remarried to family friend Thomas Chynoweth in 1889; by that time, Mary had already commissioned George W. Page to design a grand mansion at Edenvale to house three families together: Mary and her two sons, Jay and Everis.

The first Hayes Mansion was executed in a Queen Anne style and completed in late 1891. It was destroyed by fire on July 30, 1899; as the family was undergoing significant financial distress, rebuilding the mansion did not start until 1902 and it was not completed until November 1905, four months after Mary had died.

=== Hayes Mansion period (1887–1954) ===
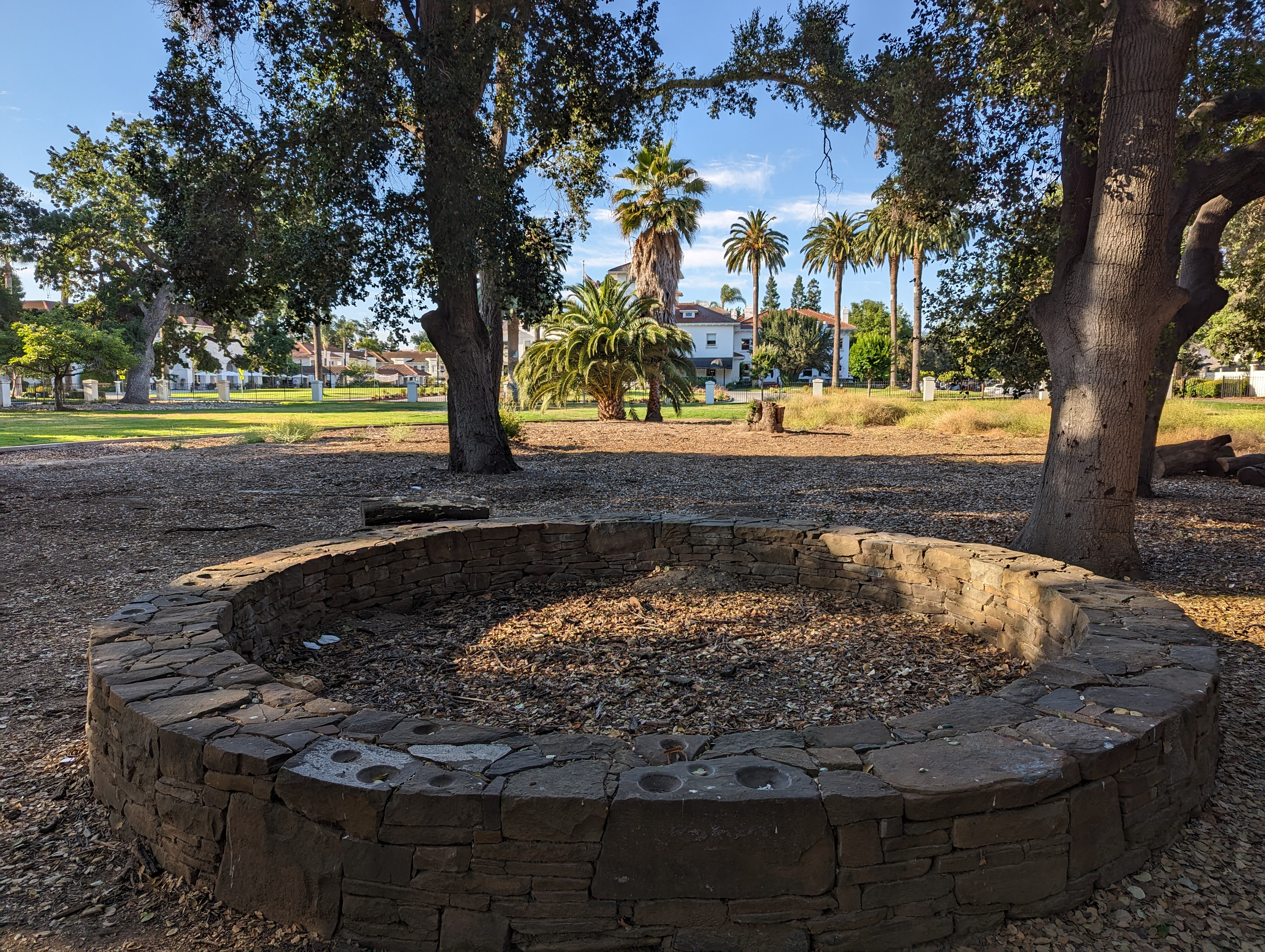
Garden Park, by Anna Valentina Murch (1997). Hayes Mansion is in the background.

After moving to Edenvale, the Hayes family set aside 40 acres (16 ha) for a formal park adjoining the Tennant house. Rudolph Ulrich was given the commission to design the park; he created a "rolling area with a stream and several 'gardens within a garden.'" The park was planted with lawns, flowerbeds, and many trees; it was fenced off, but the gate was left open for the public to visit and enjoy the grounds. The remainder of the Hayes estate, nearly 600 acres (240 ha) in total, was used as a working farm.

Jay and Everis Hayes purchased several local newspapers in the early 1900s, including the San Jose Herald (Dec 1900) and Mercury (Aug 1901), and later became active in politics; Everis won a seat in the United States House of Representatives and served from 1905 to 1919, while Jay served as a Regent of the University of California. After Jay died in 1948, the family decided to sell the mansion and land, closing the transaction in June 1954 to three private investors.

=== Frontier Village (1961–1980) ===
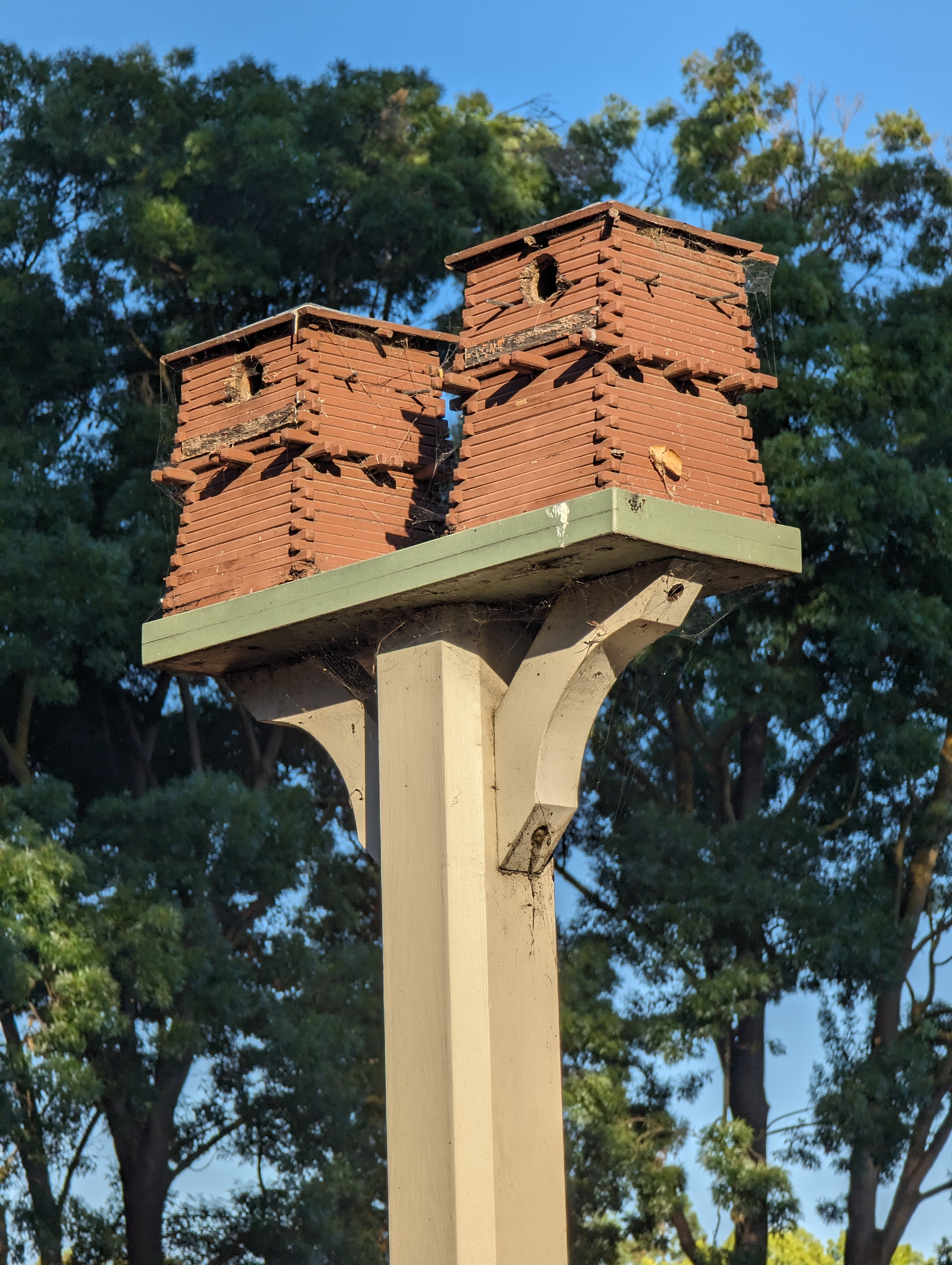
Frontier Village Birdhouse (entrance towers)

The 40-acre (16 ha) formal park was sold in 1959 to the Frontier Village Corporation, formed by Joseph Zukin, Hawley Smith, and Michael Khourie. The amusement park was laid out so carefully that only four trees were removed during construction, which cost US$2 million. Frontier Village opened on October 21, 1961, and was immortalized in a comic issue featuring Dennis the Menace in 1970. The park closed its gates for the last time on September 28, 1980, as the land had become surrounded by suburban sprawl and was purchased by the Bren Corporation for housing. Approximately half the land was redeveloped for residences, also named "Frontier Village".

All the buildings were removed from the amusement park; little is recognizable from the former Frontier Village, but items such as concrete boulders from the artificial river remain half-buried on the site.

=== Edenvale Garden Park (1987–present) ===
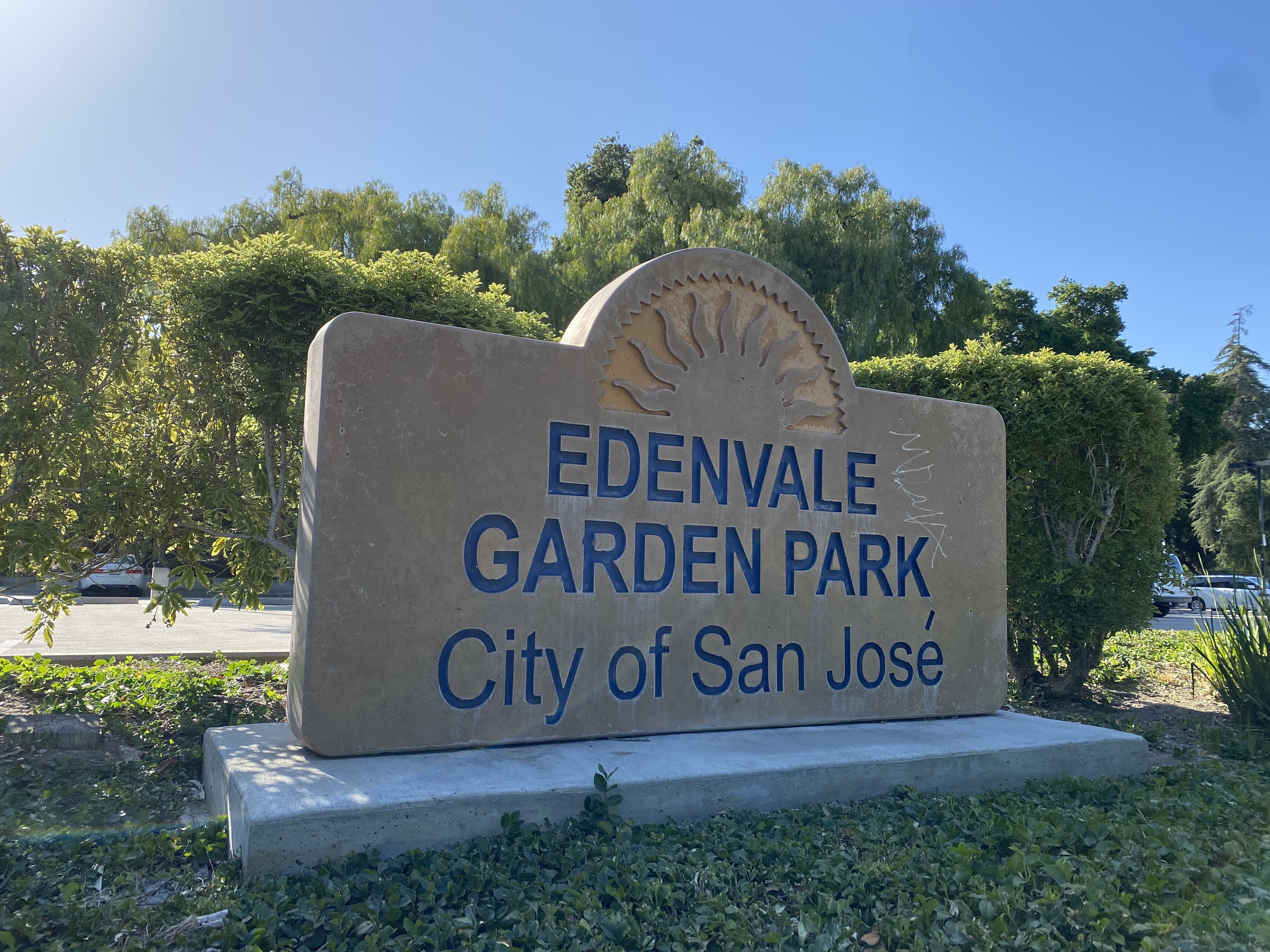
Edenvale Garden Park sign

The City of San Jose sought to preserve Hayes Mansion, as the investors floated various ideas to convert the building to condominiums, low-income housing, or an alcohol rehabilitation center; it was annexed in 1963 and placed on the National Register of Historic Places in 1975. The Bren Corporation began building houses on another parcel south of the Mansion in 1979, and the city's Redevelopment Agency purchased the mansion for $1.5 million in 1983 with plans to convert it to low- and moderate-income housing.

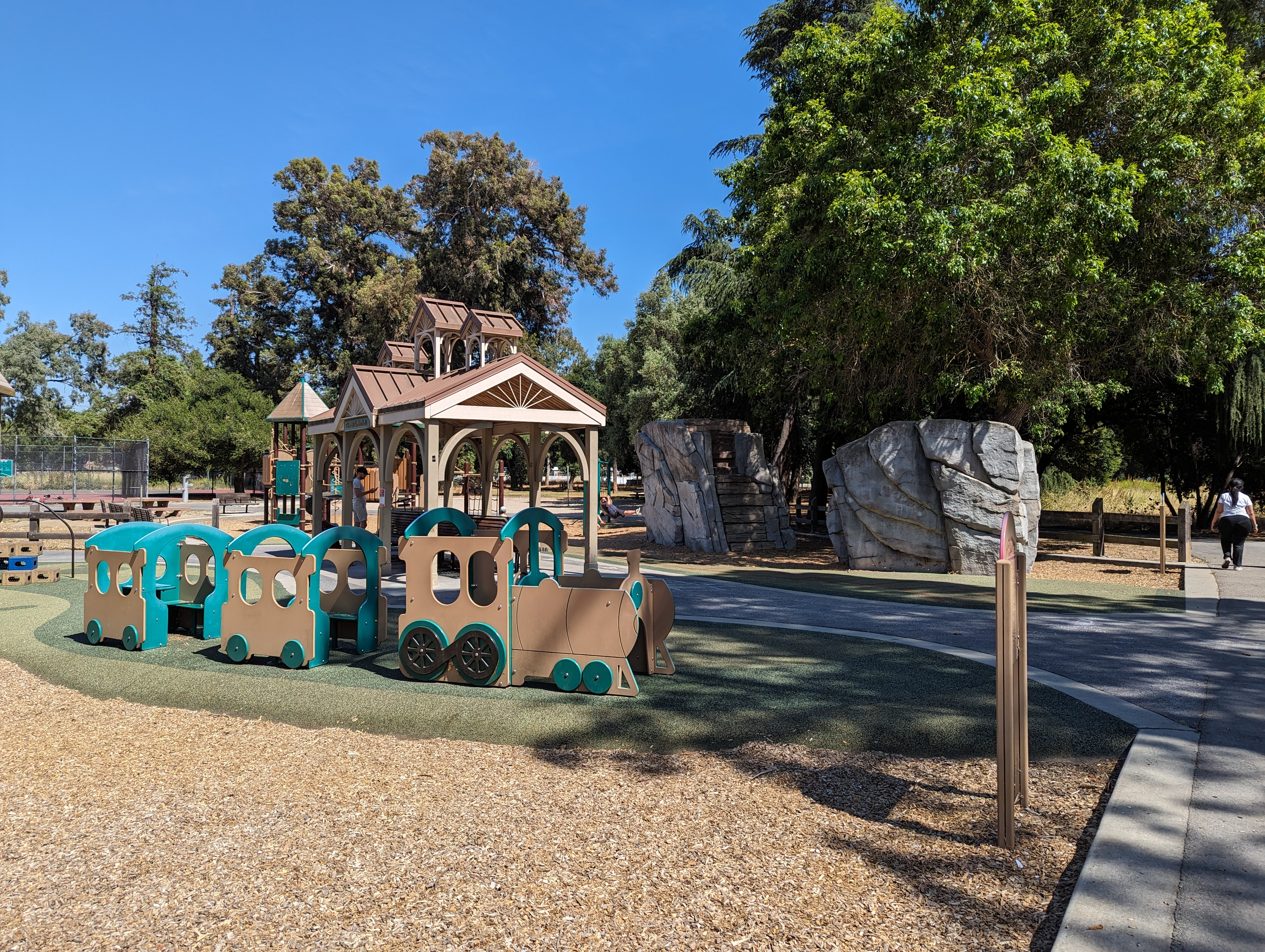
Play structures at Edenvale Garden Park

The remainder of the former Frontier Village site was purchased in 1987 for $4.5 million for what would become Edenvale Garden Park; the City of San Jose approved the master plan for the park in 1997. The city park has a playground with structures themed for the amusement park's railroad.

Anna Valentina Murch was commissioned to create an environmental artwork in the park, which was installed as Garden Park in April 1997. It is a low, circular stone wall with round holes meant to evoke mortars used by the indigenous Native Americans, with a bridge leading towards the mansion over a wildflower moat.

Barbara Grygutis installed Bird's Eye View in 2006. Local stone was used to construct a plaza with two stairways ascending adjoining hills; it is intended to echo the shadow of a bird in flight. It occupies an area of approximately 3,000 ft^{2} (280 m^{2}).

In April 2008, artist Jon Rubin installed the Frontier Village Birdhouses, five scale models of Frontier Village buildings and landmarks placed where the original structures were during the park's operating period. Each of the five scale buildings (Railroad Station; Main Entrance Log Towers; Mine Ride; Old School House; Main Street) is a functioning birdhouse and were built by Vince Duke.
