= Mary Hayes Chynoweth =

American psychic, founder of the True Life Church

Mary Hayes-Chynoweth (1825-1905) was a psychic/faith healer, mystic, founder of the "True Life Church", and editor of a journal named "True Life". She had two sons, Jaye O. Hayes and Everis A. Hayes.

== Life ==
Mary Hayes-Chynoweth was born on October 2, 1825, in Holland, NY. Her father, Rev. Abraham Folsom, was a Free Will Baptist Faith minister. The family moved to Cuba when Mary was three. She first exhibited mystic powers at the age of five when her sister was severely burned. They later moved to Wisconsin.

Hayes-Chynoweth was a school teacher in Waterloo, WI in 1853. In 1854 she married Anson Hayes, a farmer. After his death she married Thomas Chynoweth, an attorney in San Jose. He died one year after they married.

== Work ==
According to records, Mary Hayes-Chynoweth was able to see through bodies, allowing her to pinpoint their medical issues, take their ailments into her own body, and heal them using herbs, water treatments, optimism, faith, and dietary restrictions including abstaining from alcohol, coffee, tea, and tobacco. She was allegedly able to confer with patients who did not speak the same language, see patients en route to her, and foresee economic trends, allowing her to capitalize on downturns and upswings. While in Wisconsin, Hayes-Chynoweth treated US Senator William Vilas, Wisconsin Supreme Court Justice William Lyon, and Wisconsin Historical Society Superintendent Lyman Draper. Mary Hayes-Chynoweth believed the Divine Spirit had blessed her and worked miracles through her.

In 1883 Hayes-Chynoweth predicted a boom in mining and encouraged her two sons to go into mining and dig in an area 40 miles from Ashland, WI. Their ventures yielded rich iron ore in the Gogebic Range. Hayes-Chynoweth and her family owned two mines in the area, the Germania Mine and the Ashland Mine, and built the town of Hurley, WI.

In 1887 Hayes-Chynoweth moved her family to San Jose, California. They built a 64-room mansion and named the surrounding area Edenvale. When this mansion burnt down in 1899, she built a new larger Hayes Mansion which still stands today. The Hayes family owned 700 acres, much of which was planted with fruit trees and general farming. The land is now Edenvale Garden Park and is owned and operated by the city of San Jose.

In 1903 she founded the True Life Church.
