= Martial Cottle Park =

Park in San Jose, California, U.S.

Coordinates: 37.2627°N 121.8364°W

Martial Cottle Park is a park developed as a collaboration between the California Department of Parks and Recreation and Santa Clara County Parks. The park is located on 287.54 acres (116.36 hectares) of land in the city of San Jose, California, U.S.

== History ==
Martial Cottle Park is a 287.54 acre property located in a residential and commercial neighborhood of South San Jose, bounded by Branham Lane, Snell Avenue and Chynoweth Avenue. An agricultural farm through four generations, the property was jointly deeded to the California Department of Parks and Recreation and County of Santa Clara Parks and Recreation Department. The park's first section opened in 2014, and sections of the property are leased out to farming.
