= Seven Trees, San Jose =

Seven Trees
- Neighborhood of San Jose
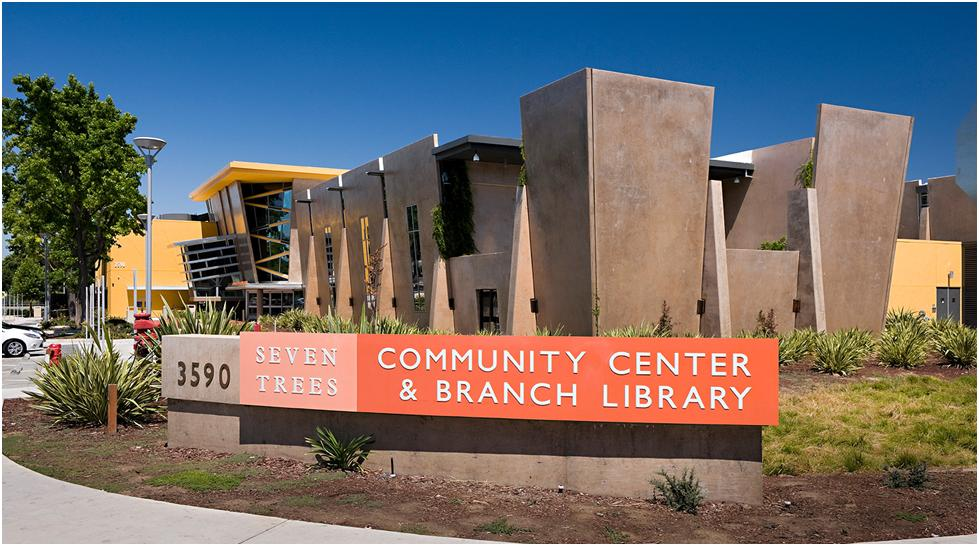
- Seven Trees Community Center and Library, part of the San José Public Library
- Location in Santa Clara County and the state of California
- Coordinates: 37°17′16″N 121°50′16″W
- Country: United States
- State: California
- County: Santa Clara

Area
  - Total: 0.15 sq mi (0.4 km^{2})
  - Land: 0.15 sq mi (0.4 km^{2})
  - Water: 0 sq mi (0 km^{2})
- Elevation: 157 ft (48 m)

Population (2000)
  - Total: 1,666
  - Density: 10,790/sq mi (4,165/km^{2})
- Time zone: UTC-8 (PST)
  - Summer (DST): UTC-7 (PDT)
- ZIP code: 95111
- Area codes: 408/669
- FIPS code: 06-71074
- GNIS feature ID: 1853415

Seven Trees is a Neighborhood of San Jose, California. It was formerly an unincorporated census-designated place surrounded completely by South San Jose and it was annexed into San Jose on November 23, 2009.

== Geography ==
Seven Trees is located at 37°17′16″N 121°50′16″W (37.287854, -121.837823).

According to the United States Census Bureau, the CDP had a total area of 0.2 square miles (0.52 km^{2}), all of its land.

== Demographics ==
Historical population
Census	Pop.	Note	%±
2000	1,666		—
U.S. Decennial Census; 1860–1870 1880-1890; 1900 1910 1920; 1930 1940 1950; 1960 1970 1980; 1990 2000 2010

Seven Trees first appeared as a census designated place in the 2000 U.S. census. It was deleted prior to the 2010 U.S. census after being annexed to San Jose city.

=== 2000 ===
As of the census of 2000, there were 1,666 people, 403 households, and 307 families residing in the CDP. The population density was 9,628.2 inhabitants per square mile (3,717.5/km^{2}). There were 415 housing units at an average density of 2,398.4 per square mile (926.0/km^{2}). The racial makeup of the CDP was 43.64% White, 1.56% African American, 3.12% Native American, 7.62% Asian, 0.30% Pacific Islander, 36.73% from other races, and 7.02% from two or more races. Hispanic or Latino of any race were 68.01% of the population.

There were 403 households, out of which 39.0% had children under the age of 18 living with them, 51.1% were married couples living together, 16.9% had a female householder with no husband present, and 23.8% were non-families. 17.6% of all households were made up of individuals, and 7.4% had someone living alone who was 65 years of age or older. The average household size was 4.13 and the average family size was 4.57.

In the CDP, the population was spread out, with 29.4% under the age of 18, 12.7% from 18 to 24, 30.4% from 25 to 44, 17.8% from 45 to 64, and 9.7% who were 65 years of age or older. The median age was 30 years. For every 100 females, there were 105.7 males. For every 100 females age 18 and over, there were 106.3 males.

The median income for a household in the CDP was $34,375, and the median income for a family was $43,313. Males had a median income of $33,625 versus $23,375 for females. The per capita income for the CDP was $17,012. About 27.6% of families and 32.8% of the population were below the poverty line, including 53.8% of those under age 18 and 8.5% of those age 65 or over.

== Government ==
In the California State Legislature, Seven Trees is in the 17th senatorial district, represented by Democrat John Laird, and in the 27th Assembly district, represented by Democrat Esmeralda Soria.

In the United States House of Representatives, Seven Trees is in California's 19th congressional district, represented by Democrat Jimmy Panetta.
