= Hayes Mansion =

Historic house in California, United States

- U.S. National Register of Historic Places
- California Historical Landmark
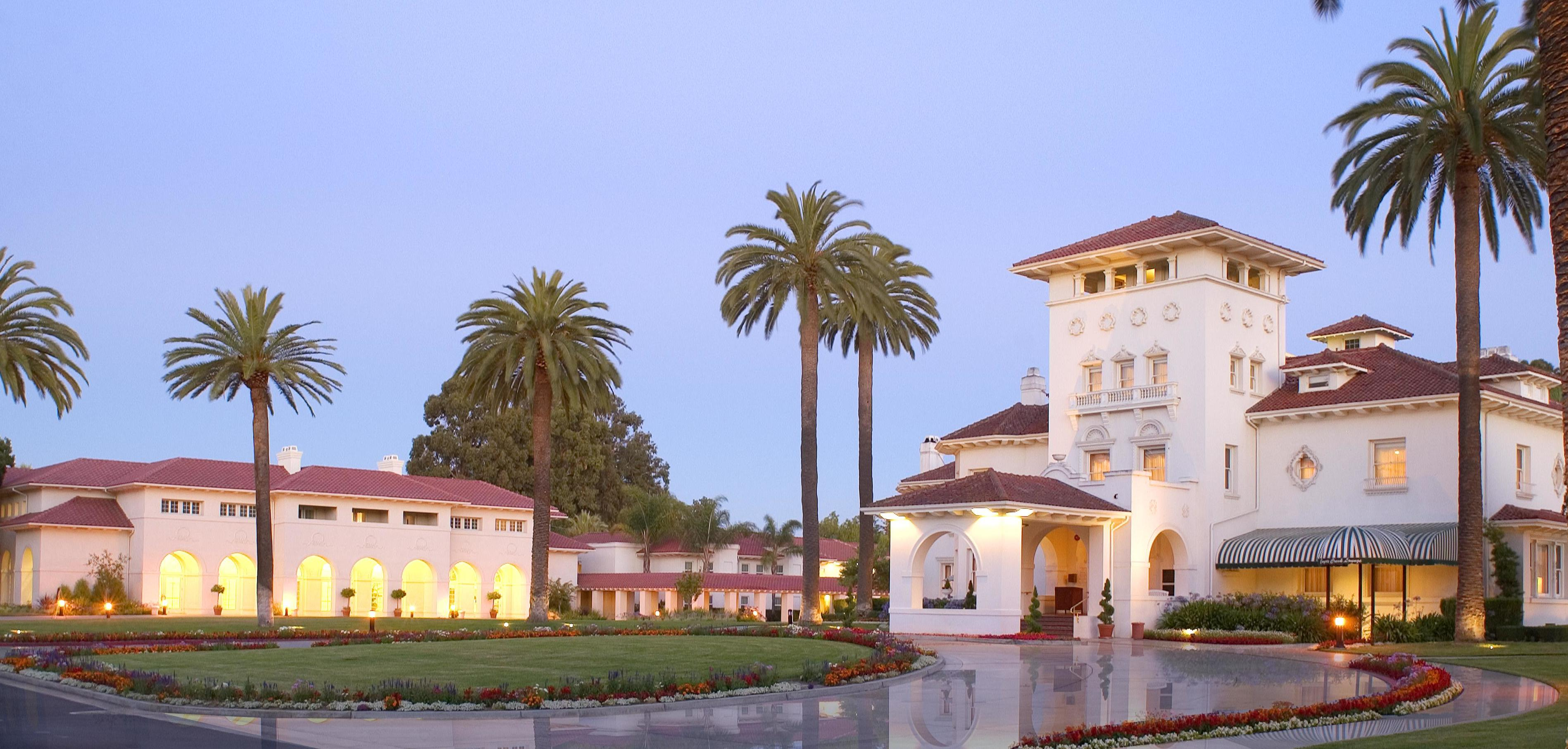
- Location: 200 Edenvale Avenue San Jose, California 95136
- Coordinates: 37°15′44.33″N 121°49′14.76″W
- Built: 1905
- Architect: George Page
- Architectural style: Mission Revival
- Website: https://www.hayesmansion.com/
- NRHP reference No.: 75000481
- CHISL No.: 888

Significant dates
- Added to NRHP: August 1, 1975
- Designated CHISL: 1975

The Hayes Mansion is a historic mansion estate in the Edenvale neighborhood of San Jose, California. The mansion currently operates as a hotel resort and is currently known as Hayes Mansion San Jose, Curio Collection by Hilton. The hotel has been a member of Historic Hotels of America, the official program of the National Trust for Historic Preservation, since 2019.

Originally the home of the Hayes family, the mansion is regarded as one of the best examples of late 19th-century Mission Revival architecture in the Santa Clara Valley. It is a California Historical Landmark and listed on the National Register of Historic Places.

== History ==
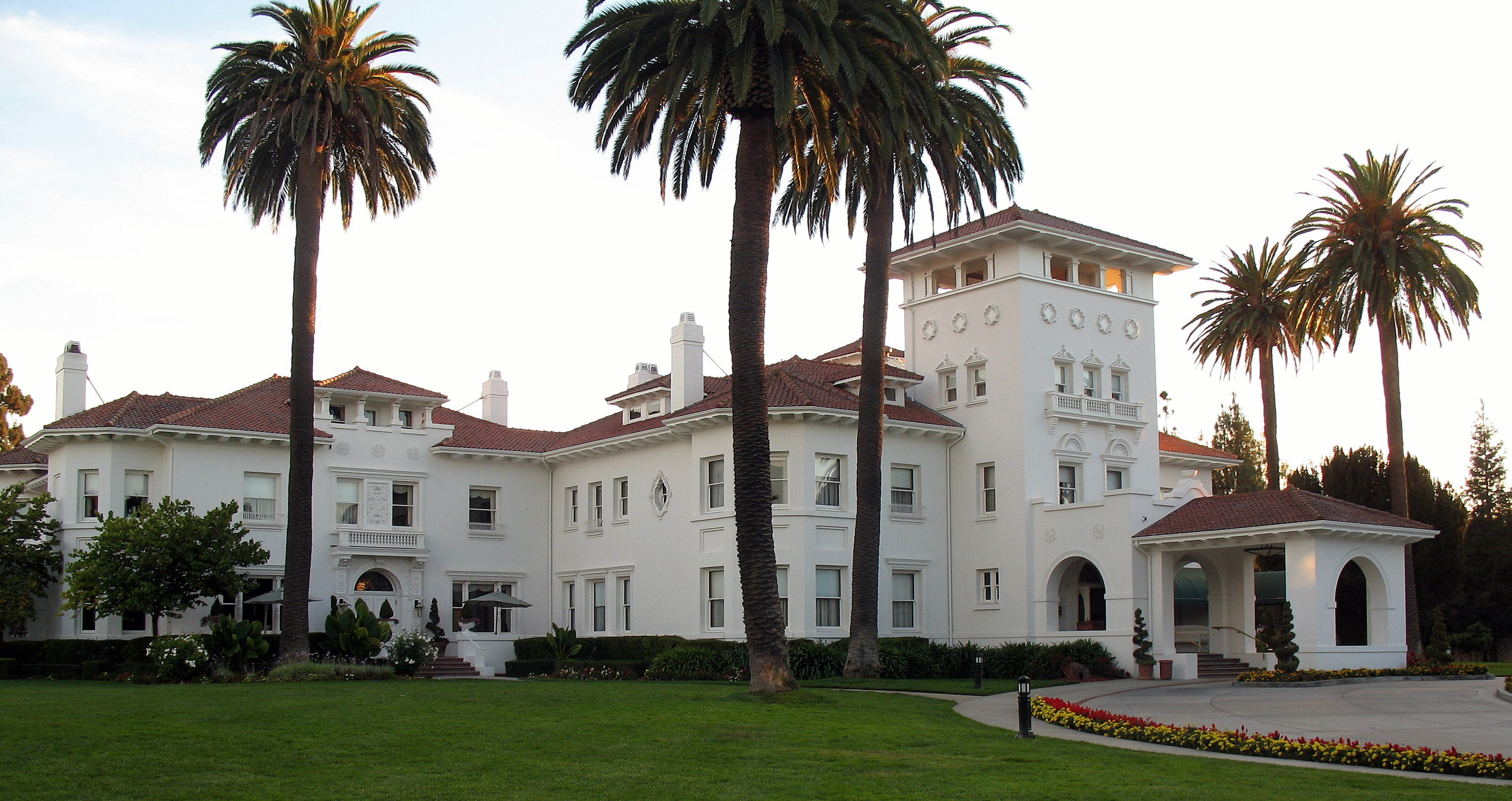
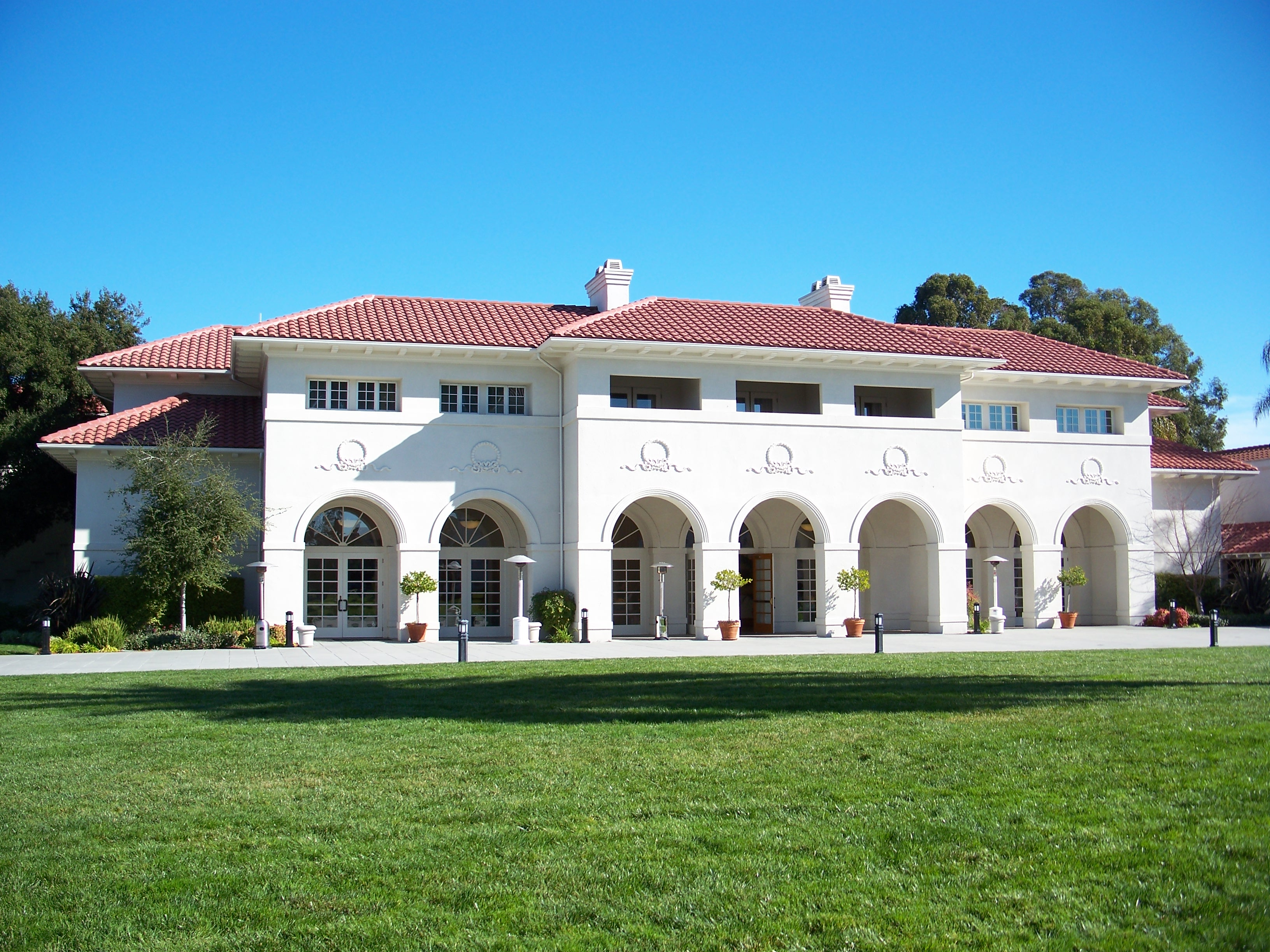
Hayes mansion is one of the best examples of Mediterranean Revival architecture in the Silicon Valley.

Architect George Page was commissioned in 1903 by Mary Chynoweth, widow of Anson Hayes and wife of San Jose attorney Thomas Chynoweth, to build a home to replace the Hayes family's wooden English Baroque mansion, which had burned to the ground in 1899. Intended to provide a triple residence for the Chynoweths and growing families of Mary's two sons (Everis A. Hayes and Jay Orly Hayes), the home's design incorporated the latest fire safety features of the day.

Early on, the property was self-sufficient, with its own power plant, a post office, railroad station, carriage stop, lodgings for 40 ranch hands, and a chapel. The family grew fruits and vegetables and raised its own livestock. Everis A. Hayes and Jay Hayes went on to help develop the Santa Clara Valley fruit industry and became the publishers of the San Jose Mercury. Everis Hayes served seven terms in the U.S. House of Representatives as a Republican, from 1905 to 1919. Jay Hayes was founder and president of the California Prune and Apricot Growers Association, which later became the Sunsweet Growers co-operative. Three U.S. presidents visited the mansion during their prominence.

The family sold the property during the 1950s, after which the building remained vacant for some time then became dilapidated. Purchased by the City of San Jose in 1985, the Mansion opened as a meeting venue in 1994. The building now contains 33,000 square feet (3,100 m^{2}) of meeting space and 214 guest rooms and is surrounded by the 20-acre (8.1 ha) Edenvale Gardens Regional Park. Interstate Hotels and Resorts (now Aimbridge Hospitality) began managing the resort in 2019.

== Architecture ==
The 41,000-square-foot (3,800 m^{2}) Mediterranean villa features exotic woods, imported marble and ornate stained glass windows. Constructed in the shape of a Maltese Cross, its long center section contains an 18-foot (5.45 m) wide solarium connecting the north and south wings.

A loggia connects the east with the west. Walls are stucco coated double brick. Fire-safety features include fire hose cabinets connected to water tanks on the third floor and a kitchen located in a separate building connected to the mansion by a glass and marble conservatory.
