= Santa Teresa, San Jose =

Neighborhood in San Jose, California

Santa Teresa
- Neighborhood of San Jose
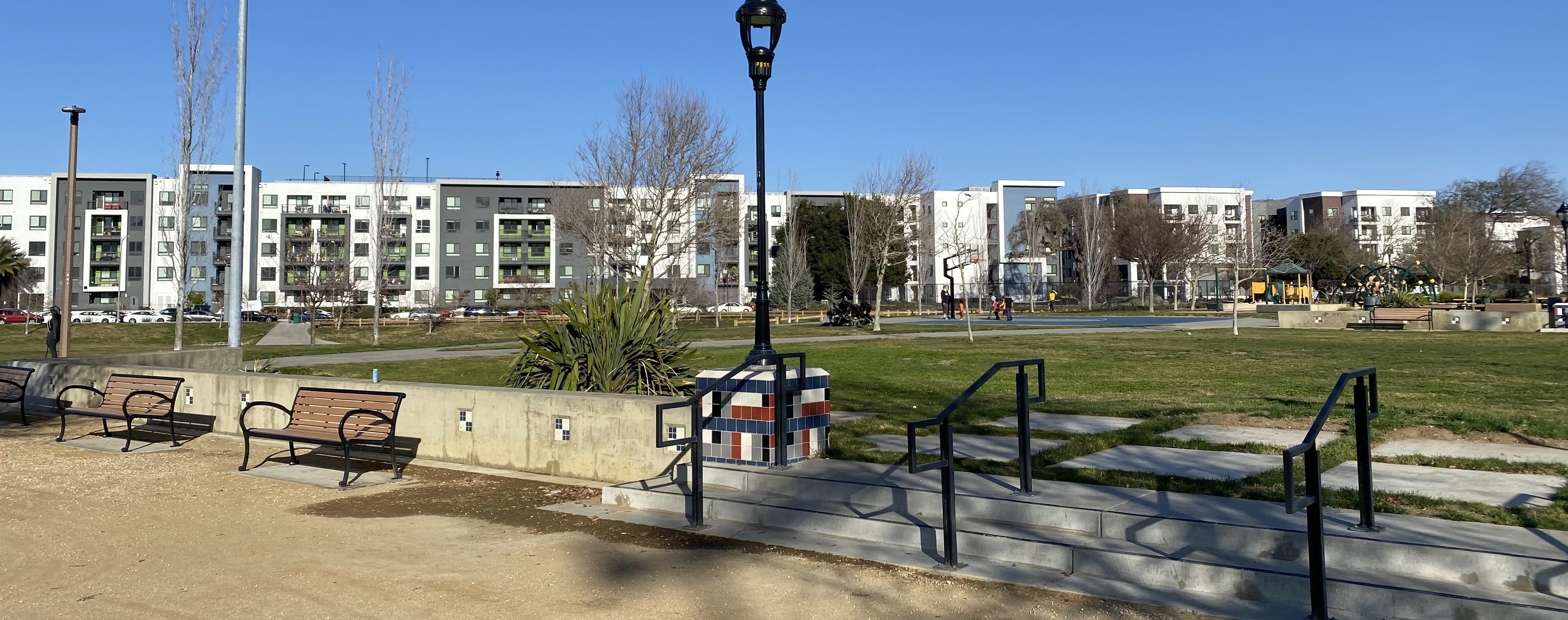
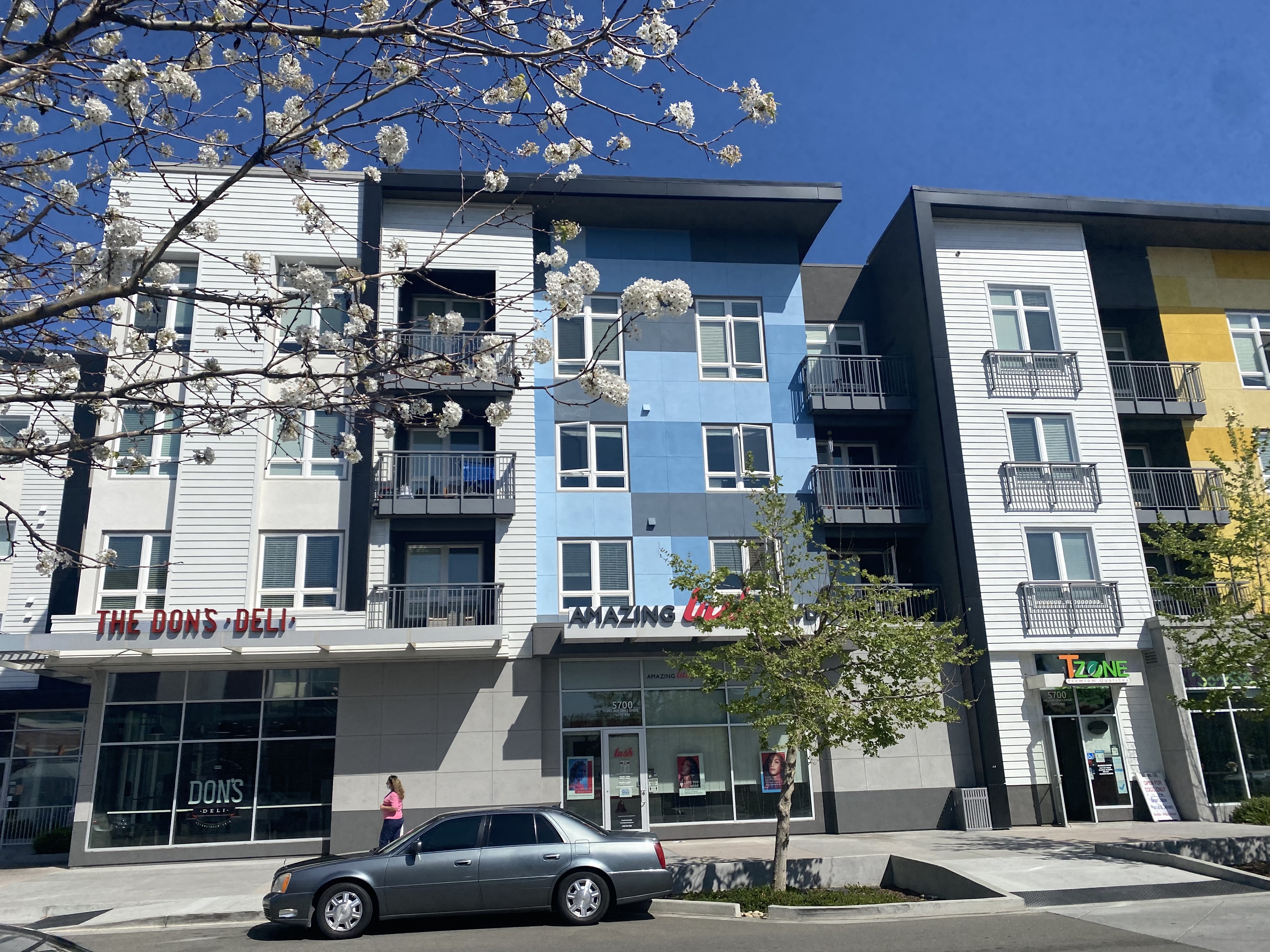
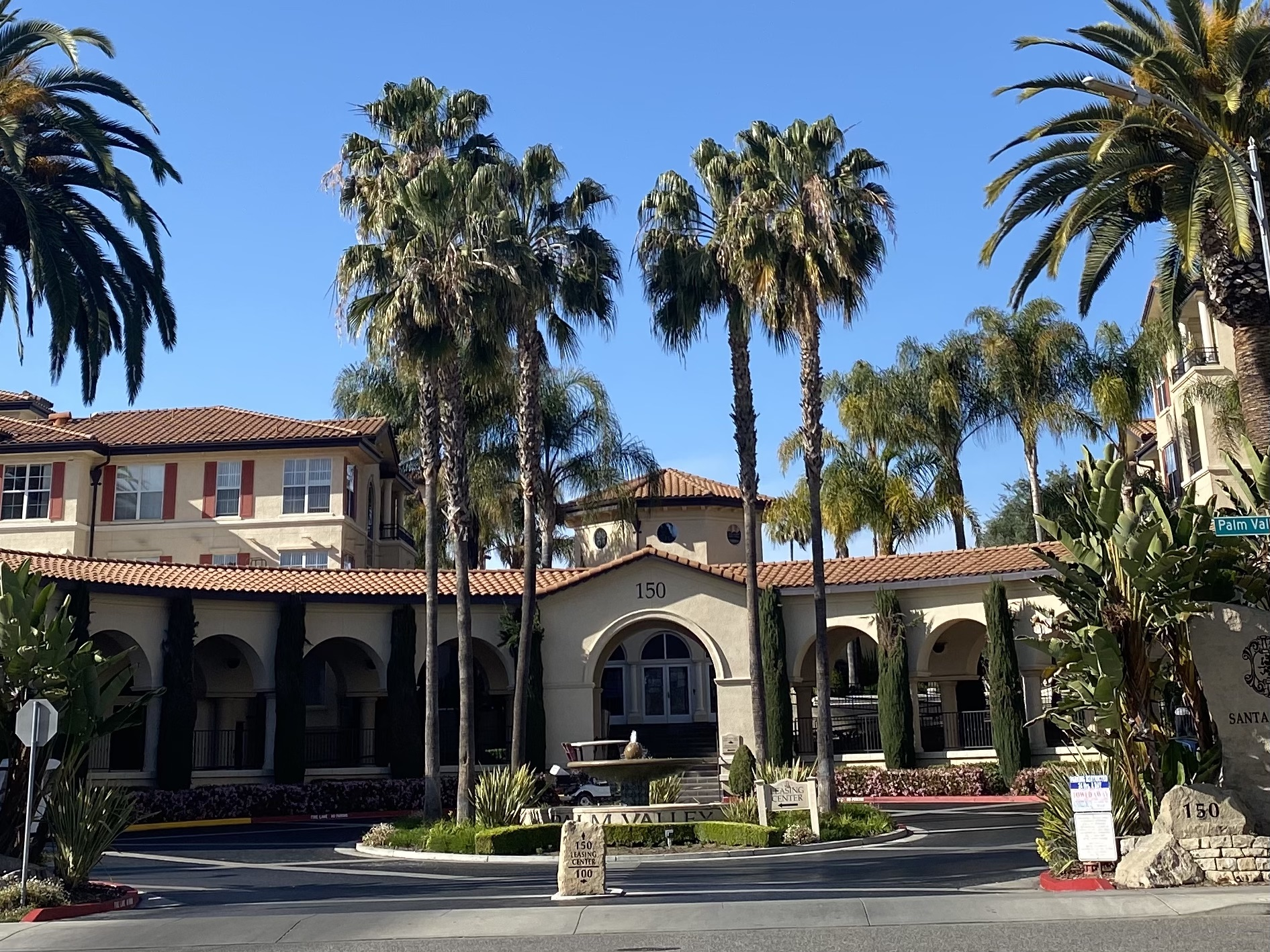
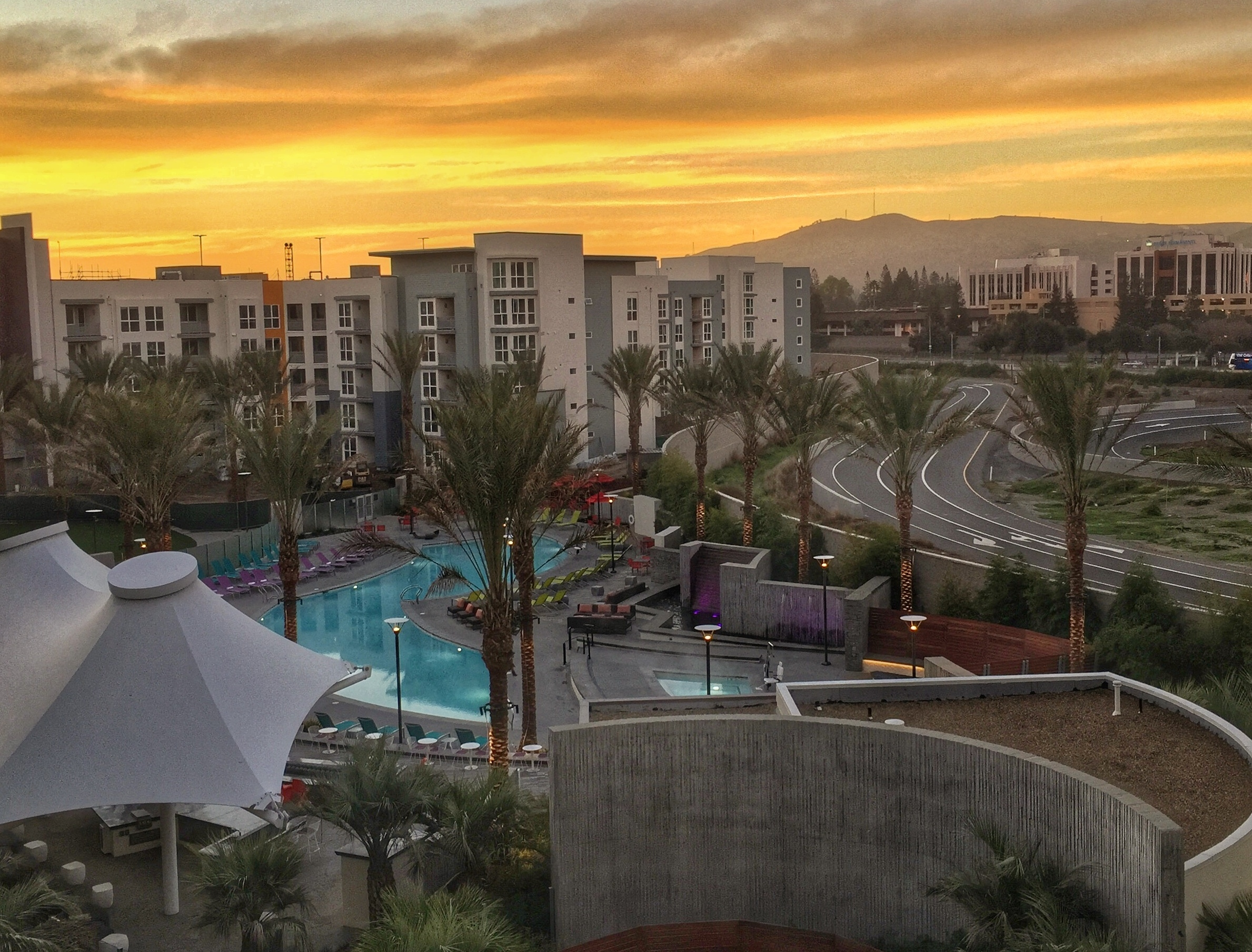
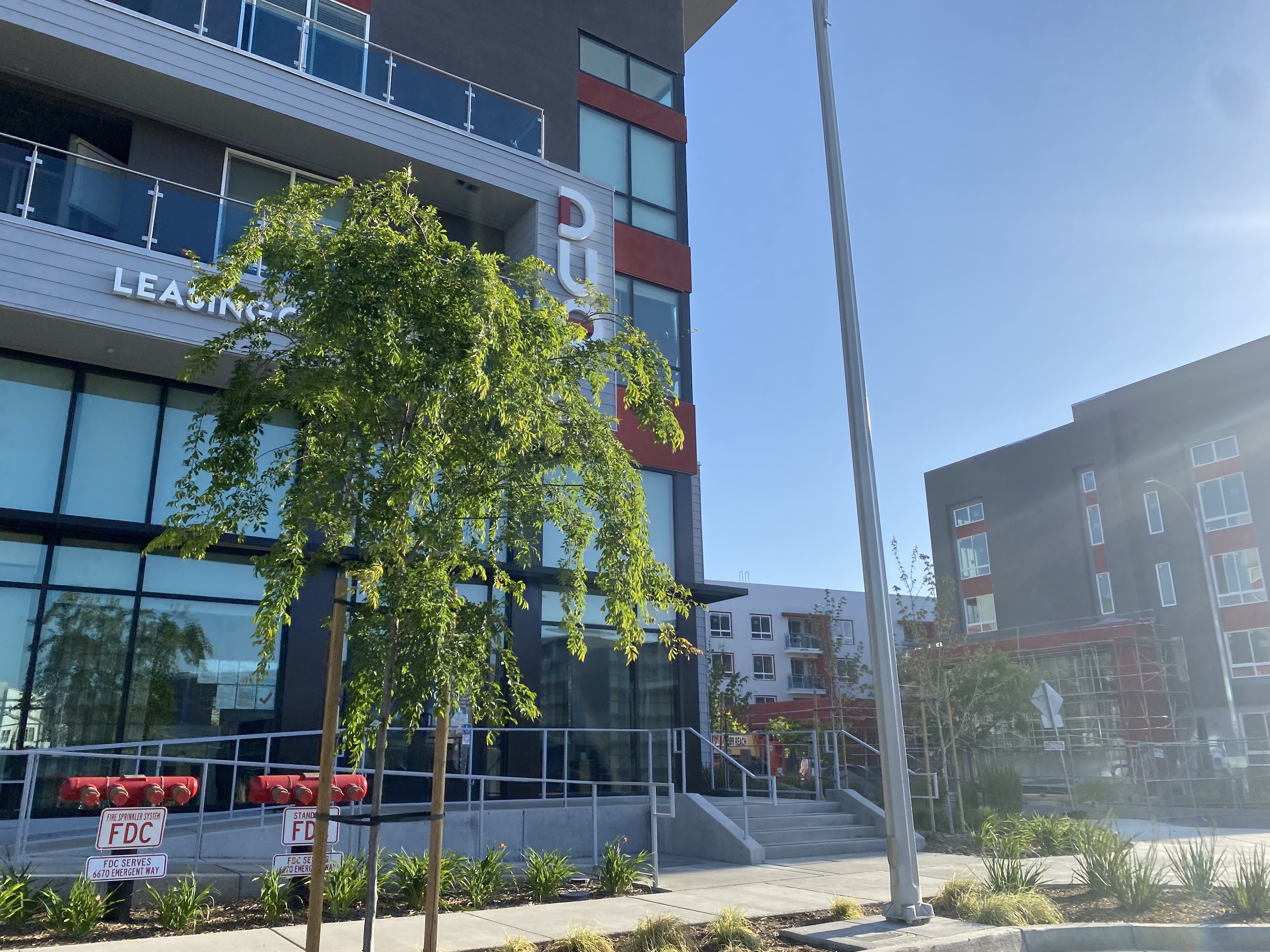
- Top: Ramac Park; middle: shops on Village Oaks Dr; apartments on Palmia Ave; bottom: view of the Santa Teresa Hills from Ascent Apartments; apartments on Vía del Oro.

- Location within San Jose
- Coordinates: 37.227948°N 121.778641°W
- Country: United States
- State: California
- County: Santa Clara
- City: San Jose

Population (2021)
  - Total: 56,000

Santa Teresa is a neighborhood of San Jose, California, United States, located in South San Jose. Founded in 1834, Santa Teresa was originally established as Rancho Santa Teresa by the Bernal family, a prominent Californio clan. Today, Santa Teresa is largely a residential area, but also home to numerous Silicon Valley tech campuses.

Santa Teresa is the southernmost urban district of San Jose, bordering the largely protected Coyote Valley to its south. It is bound by the Santa Teresa Hills to its south and the Bayshore Freeway (101) to its east.

== History ==
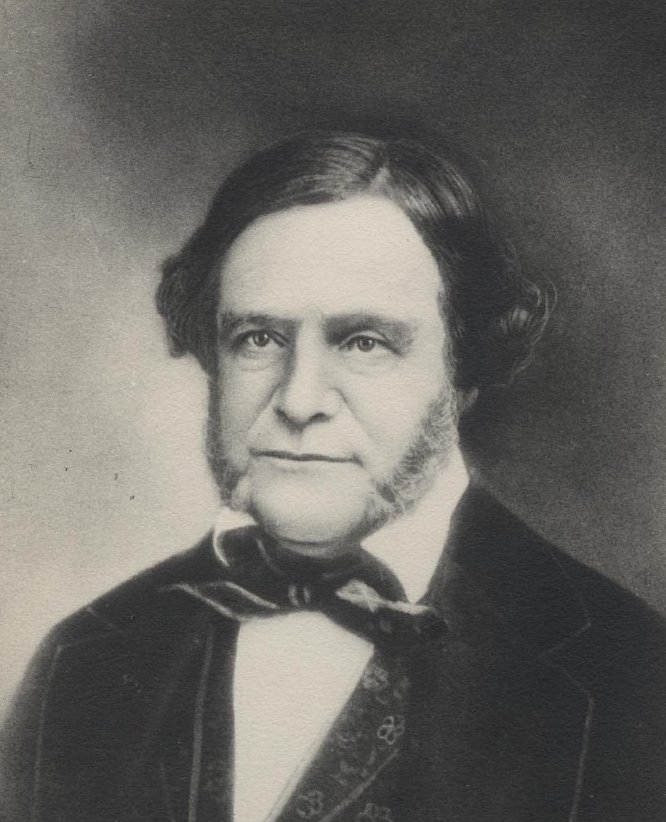
Don Bruno Bernal ran Rancho Santa Teresa from 1837 to 1863, following the death of his father and founder of the rancho, Don José Joaquín Bernal.

Santa Teresa was founded in 1834 as Rancho Santa Teresa, a rancho grant given by Governor José Figueroa to Don José Joaquín Bernal, a retired soldier who came to Alta California as part of the De Anza Expedition in 1776. Prior to receiving the rancho grant, José Joaquín Bernal had already settled in the area since 1826. Bernal named the area Santa Teresa after attributing the healing waters of the Santa Teresa Spring to Saint Teresa of Ávila, the 16th century Spanish saint. Rancho Santa Teresa quickly became an important center for Californio life in the southern Santa Clara Valley, attracting vaqueros and their families from the region with regular fiestas featuring Fandango dancing and large feasts.

Following the death of Don José Joaquín, his second son, Don Bruno Bernal, took over the rancho's administration, while his two brothers, Agustín and Juan Pablo, sought businesses ventures outside of Santa Teresa. By the time of the California Gold Rush, Agustín and Juan Pablo were selling their cattle to miners in Gold Country, while Bruno managed affairs at home. Don Bruno became one of the region's most prominent public figures and ran the rancho until his death in 1863. Today, a part of the original rancho is preserved as the Rancho Santa Teresa Historic District, though the original adobe hacienda of the rancho has burned down.

The Treaty of Santa Teresa (Spanish: Tratado de Santa Teresa) was signed at the rancho in 1844, temporarily ending the hostilities between Governor Manuel Micheltorena and the revolters led by former Governor Juan Bautista Alvarado.

=== Technology in Santa Teresa ===
Many technology-related companies have campuses in the Santa Teresa area.

Equinix, an American multinational internet-connectivity company, has their Great Oaks campus situated in the north-eastern corner of Santa Teresa. The company, founded in 1998, boasts 5 data centers in their Great Oaks campus, SV1, opened in 1999, SV5 in 2010, SV10 in 2017, SV11 in 2021, and SV12 in 2024. There are currently two more Equinix data centers in the process of construction in the Great Oaks campus, SV18 and SV19, with completion expected to be 2026 and 2028, respectively.

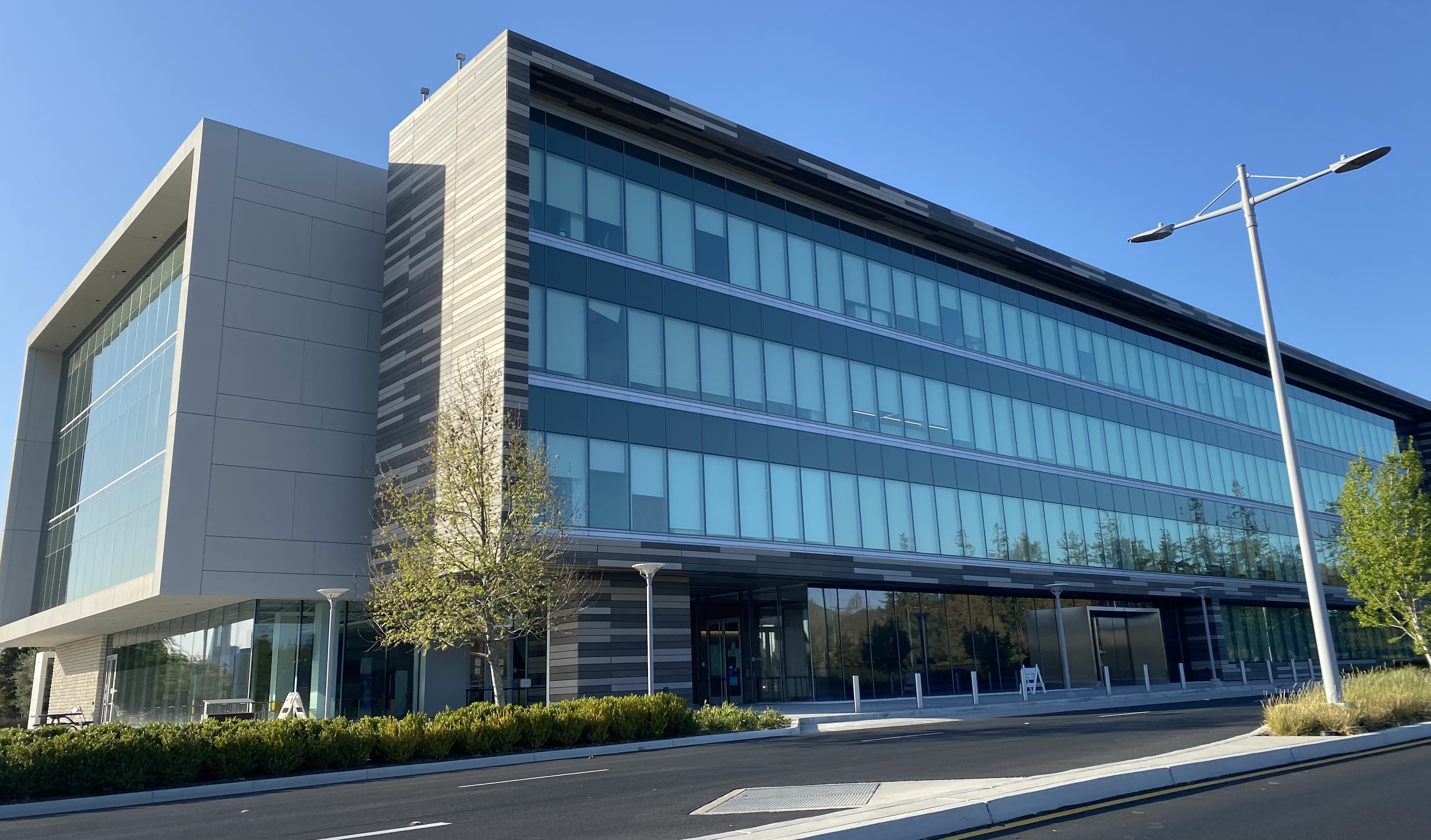
Western Digital headquarters in northern Santa Teresa.

Western Digital, an American data storage and hard disk drive manufacturing company, has their company headquarters in the northern portion of the Santa Teresa neighborhood. The company's headquarters were moved from Irvine to their Great Oaks campus in April 2017. The Great Oaks campus, which was built by IBM in 1956 and was owned by Hitachi Global Storage Technologies after acquiring IBM's hard disk drive in 2003, became part of Western Digital when HGST was bought for $3.9B USD in March 2012.

IBM, an American multinational technology company, has many facilities in the Santa Teresa area. The first IBM facility in Santa Teresa was the Cottle Road campus, which was built in the 1950s along Cottle Road. The campus was built to help mass-manufacture the IBM 305 RAMAC, the first computer ever built that utilized a hard disk drive. The campus, which was built in 1957, sprawled 210 acres and was designed with "low rise buildings, art, and a cafeteria." Most notable of all of these buildings was Building 025, where the mass production of the RAMAC and the development of the first floating hard disk drive occurred. Production of the RAMAC and floating hard disk drive in Building 025 continued until 1996, when the building became vacant as employees were moved to other locations. Building 025 stood standing until 2008, when a fire destroyed what was left of the building. In its place today stands a Lowe's. A nearby building, Building 11, was used a self-service cafeteria at the campus, serving upwards of 10,000 employees at the campus' peak, and even receiving a visit from Soviet Leader Nikita Khrushchev in 1959. When the surrounding buildings were being demolished to make room for high-density housing in the mid-2000's, Western Digital purchased the vacant building to preserve its history. Building 11 once had plans for a technology museum, but however, it currently sits abandoned and fenced off. RAMAC Park, which sits adjacent to the now-abandoned Building 11, was named after the IBM 305 RAMAC computer.

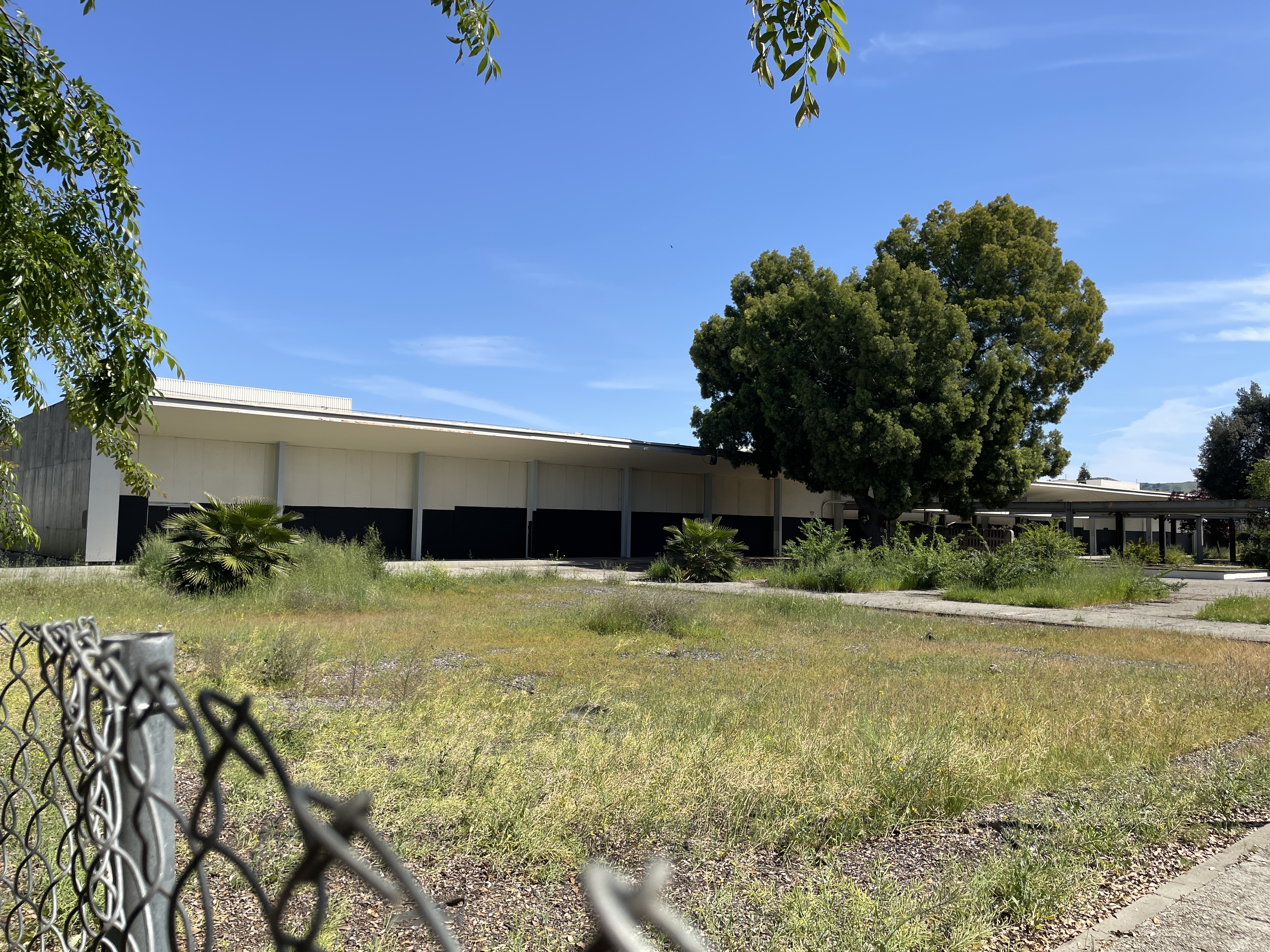
The former cafeteria at Building 11 sits abandoned and fenced off.

IBM Research has their Almaden research facility in the Santa Teresa Hills south of Santa Teresa. The site was built in 1985 due to its close proximity to Stanford University, UC Santa Cruz, and UC Berkeley. The site occupies 700 acres and was sold to IBM by the Joice family, who operated a ranch at the base of the hills. IBM donated the unused land to Santa Clara County, who used the land for the Santa Teresa County Park.

IBM's Silicon Valley Lab sits just south of Santa Teresa, on Bailey Ave in Coyote Valley. In 1974, the company purchased 1,180 acres of land that formerly belonged to Rancho Santa Teresa, and constructed the first programming laboratory in Silicon Valley, which was completed in 1977.

== Geography ==
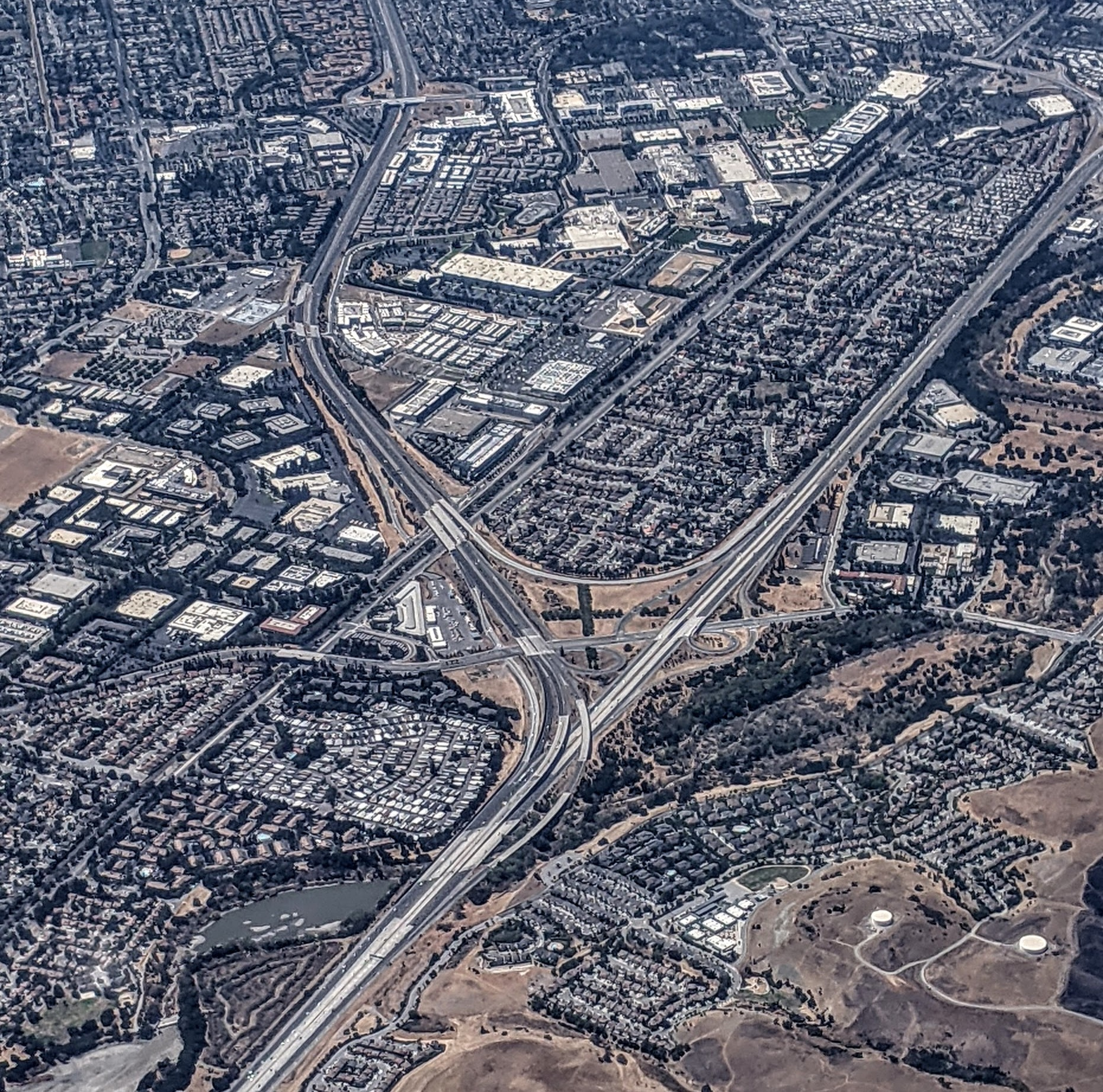
Aerial view of Santa Teresa.

Santa Teresa is located in South San Jose. It is separated in the west from Almaden Valley by the Santa Teresa Hills and located north of Coyote Valley, which separates Santa Teresa from the Madrone neighborhood of Morgan Hill. To the northeast of Santa Teresa is Edenvale and to the northwest is Blossom Valley.

Tulare Hill serves as the barrier between the southern tip of Santa Teresa and Coyote Valley.

It is made up of the ZIP Codes 95119, 95123, 95139, 95193, and the parts of 95138 that are west of Coyote Creek.

The Cottle Transit Village is an Urban Village of Santa Teresa located in the north-central portion of the neighborhood.

== Parks and plazas ==
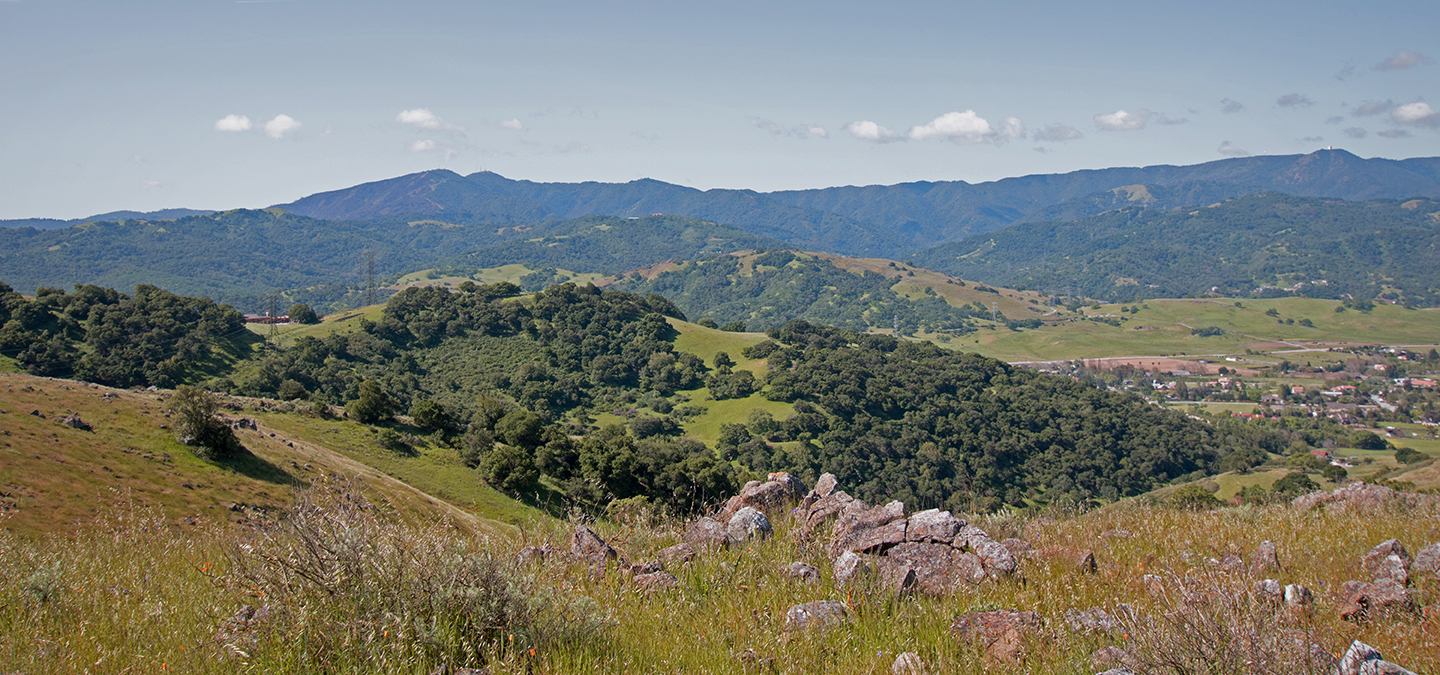
Santa Teresa County Park.

- Santa Teresa County Park
- Palmia Park
- La Colina Park
- Los Paseos Park
- George Page Park
- Ramac Park
- Raleigh Linear Park
- Avenida España Park
- Black Mountain Bowmen

== Education ==
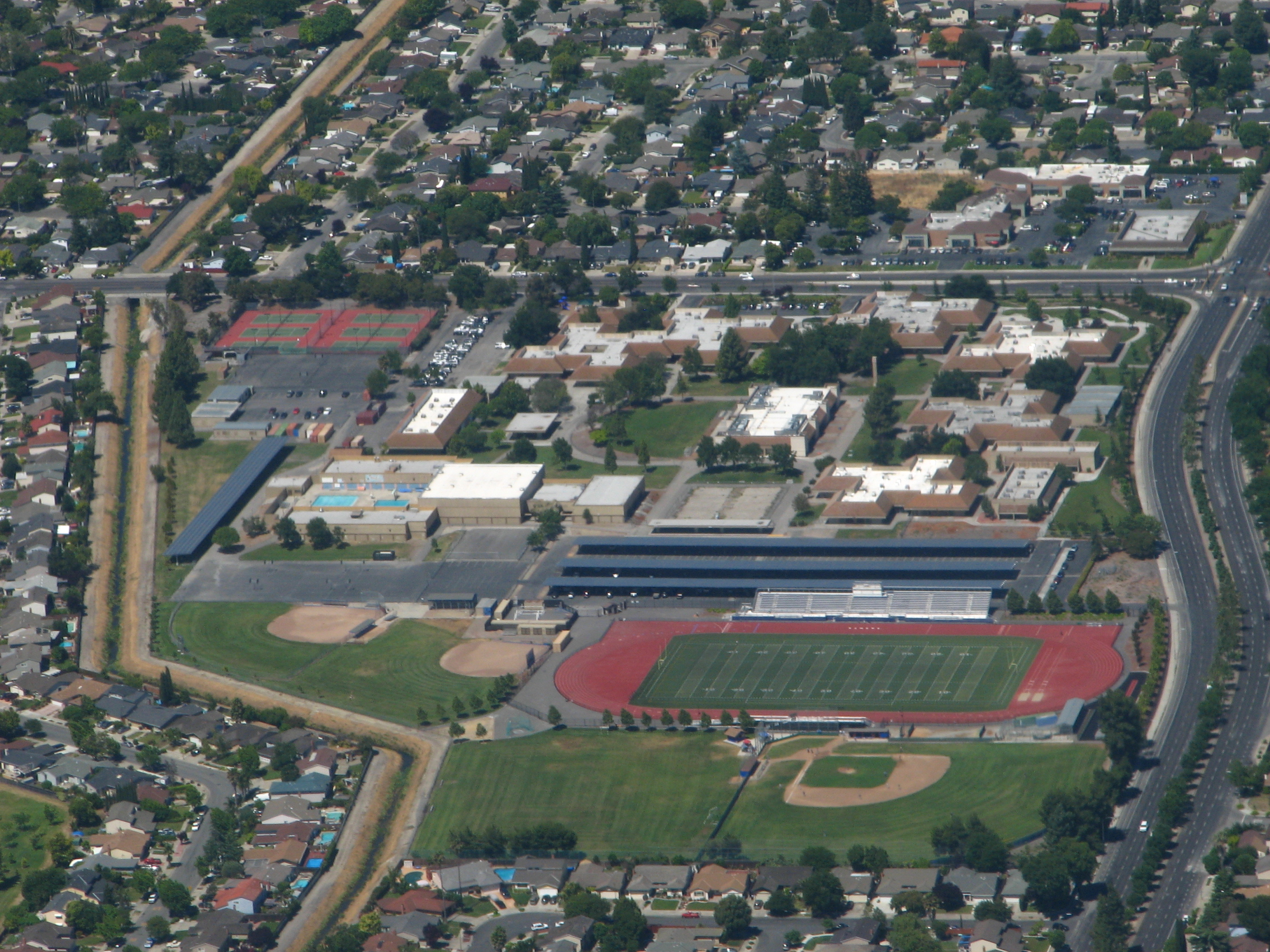
Santa Teresa High School and Canoas Creek to the left.

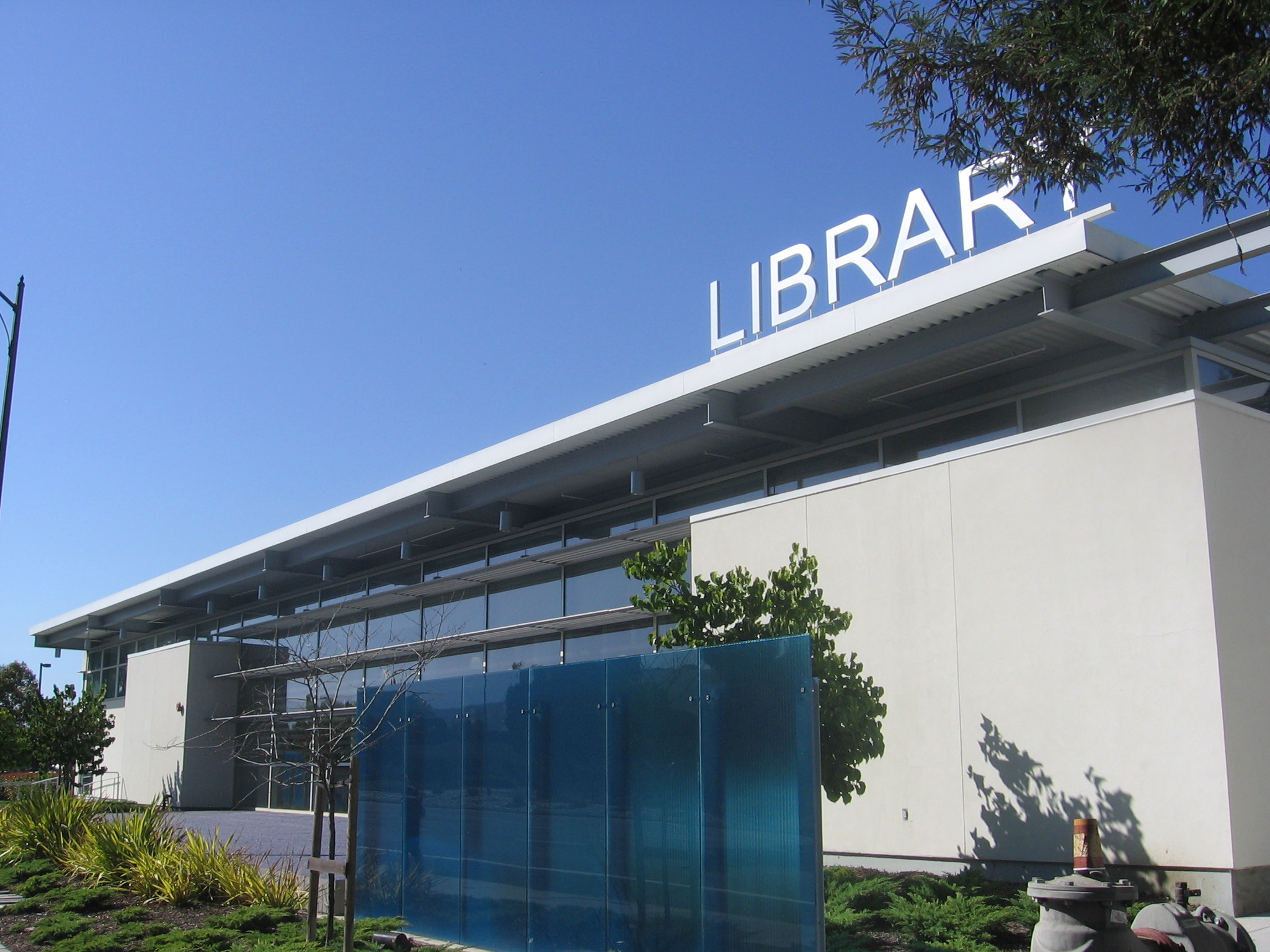
Santa Teresa branch of the San José Public Library.

Santa Teresa is mostly served by Oak Grove School District and East Side Union High School District, which includes:

- Taylor Elementary School
- Santa Teresa Elementary School
- Bernal Intermediate School
- Santa Teresa High School

Oak Grove School District used to formerly serve the following schools in Santa Teresa:

- Blossom Valley Elementary School (closed 2003)
- San Anselmo Elementary School (closed 2003)
- Glider Elementary School (closed 2018)

The southernmost portions of Santa Teresa are served by the Morgan Hill Unified School District, which operates two schools in Santa Teresa:

- Los Paseos Elementary School
- Martin Murphy Middle School

== Transportation ==
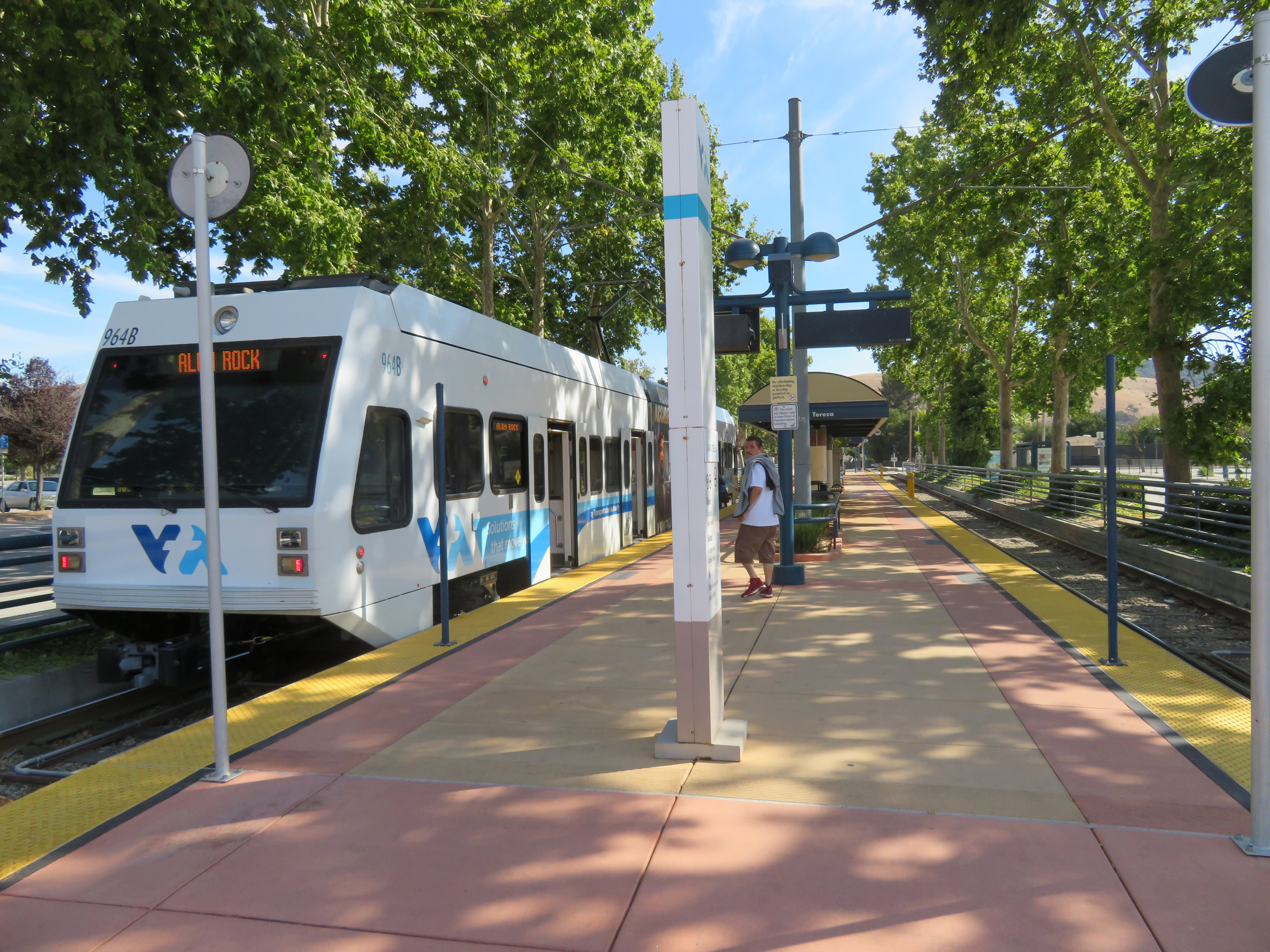
Santa Teresa station on the Blue Line of the VTA light rail.

Santa Teresa is served by two major transportations method, train and bus. VTA serves train and bus access in Santa Teresa, while CalTrain serves a station in northern Santa Teresa.

=== VTA Light Rail ===
Santa Teresa is served by three stations of the VTA light rail.

- Cottle station on Cottle Rd (central Santa Teresa)
- Santa Teresa station on Santa Teresa Blvd (southern Santa Teresa)
- Snell station on Snell Rd (serving both western Santa Teresa and Blossom Valley)

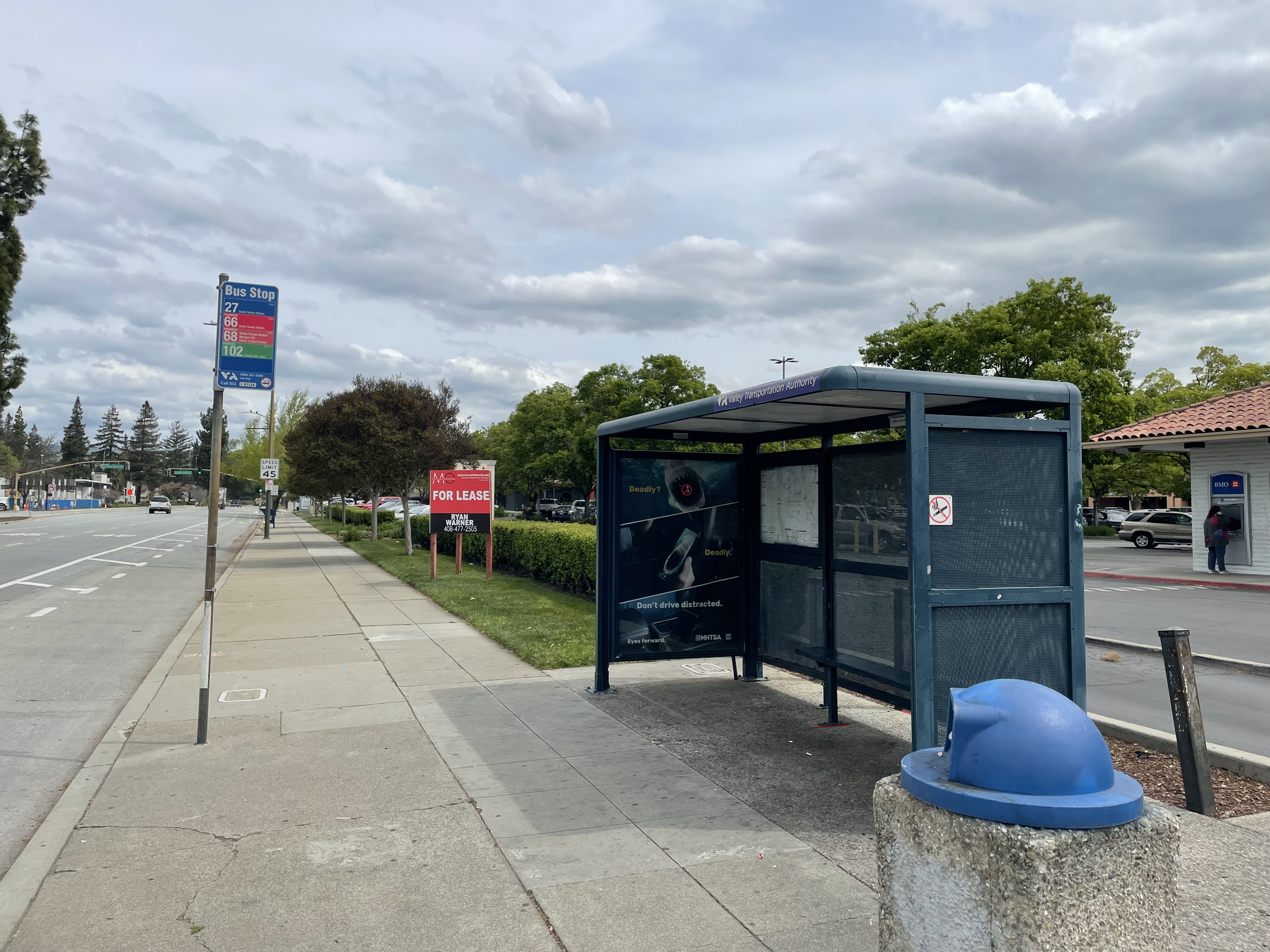
Santa Teresa & Cottle Southbound bus stop

=== VTA Bus Service ===
Santa Teresa is also served by the VTA bus service. It has 5 bus lines that serve Santa Teresa, 2 regular lines, 2 Frequent lines, and 1 Express line.

== Landmarks ==
- Kaiser San Jose Medical Center
- Santa Teresa County Park
- Rancho Santa Teresa Historic District
- IBM Research Center

== In popular culture ==
- Santa Teresa is the home of Kinsey Millhone in Sue Grafton's "Alphabet" series of detective novels. However, in the novels Santa Teresa is a fictional town in Santa Barbara County ninety miles north of Los Angeles.

== Gallery ==
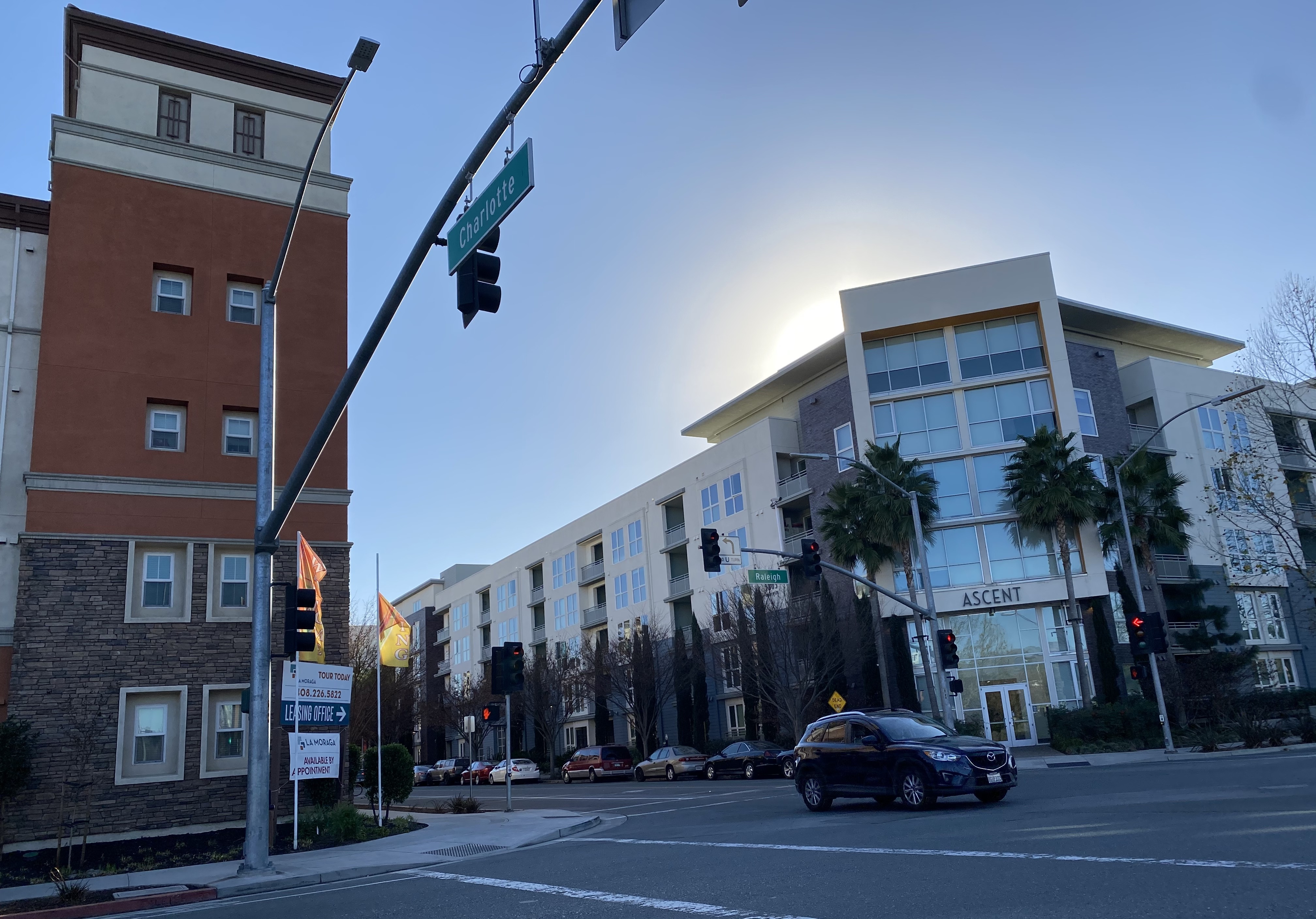
Intersection of Charlotte & Raleigh

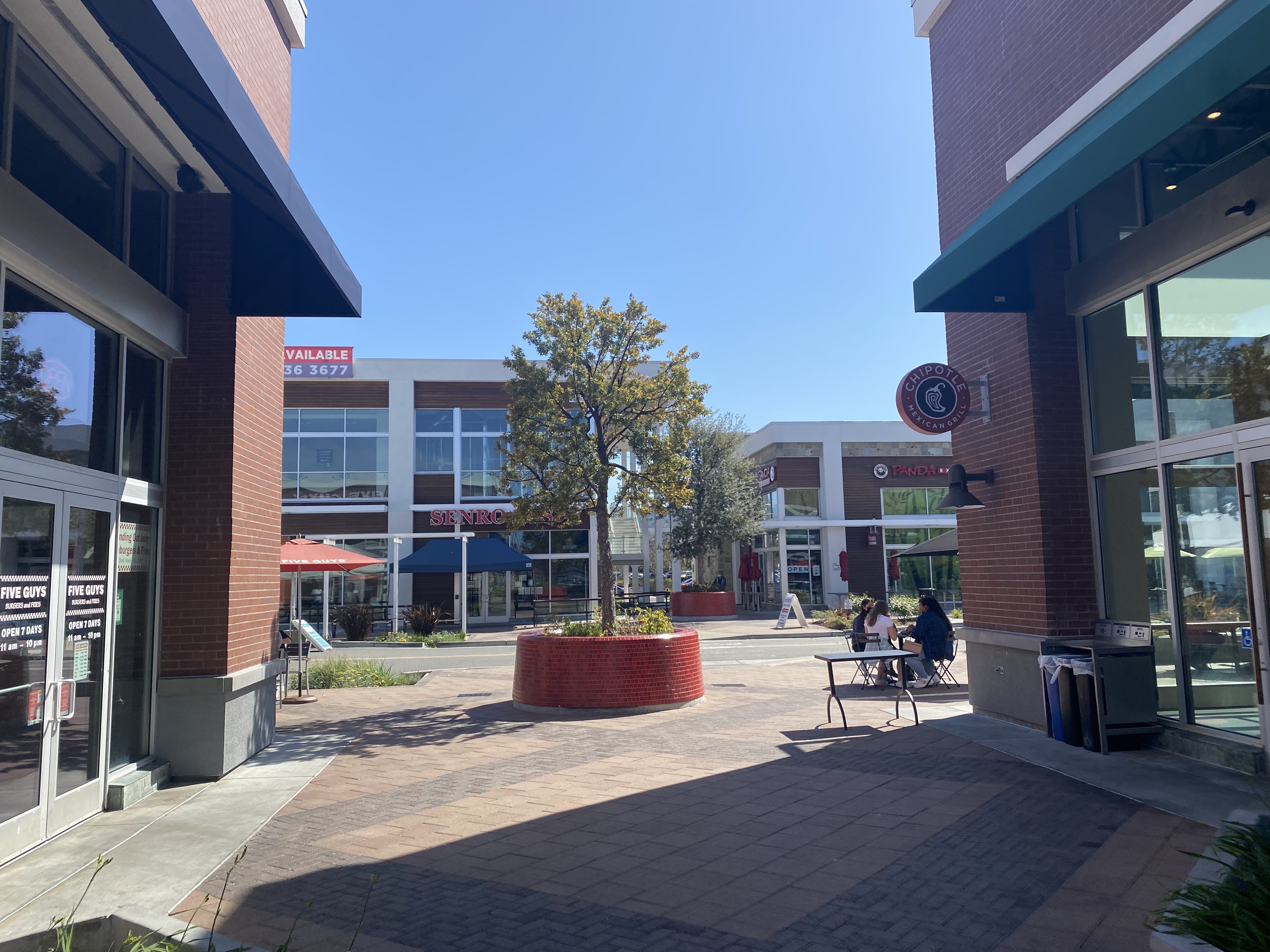
Shops on Coronado Ave

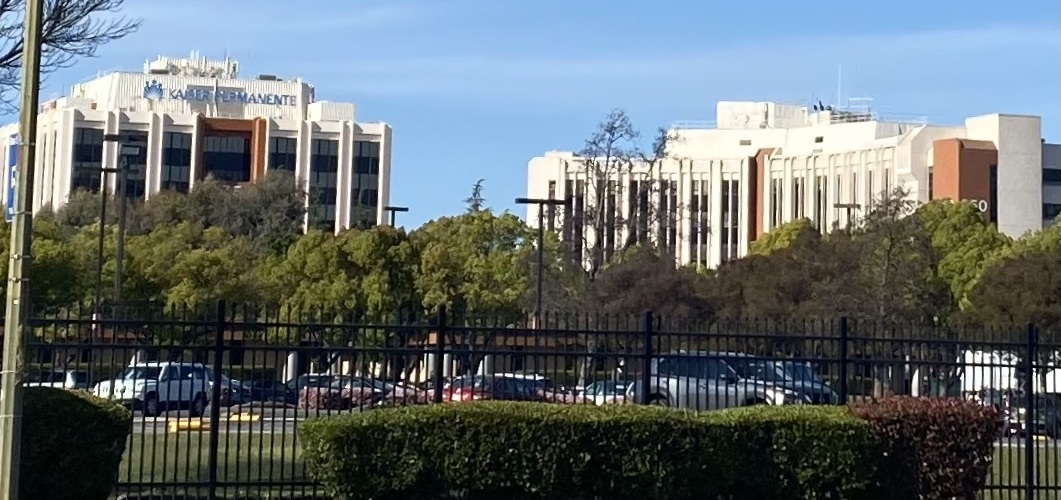
Kaiser San Jose Medical Center

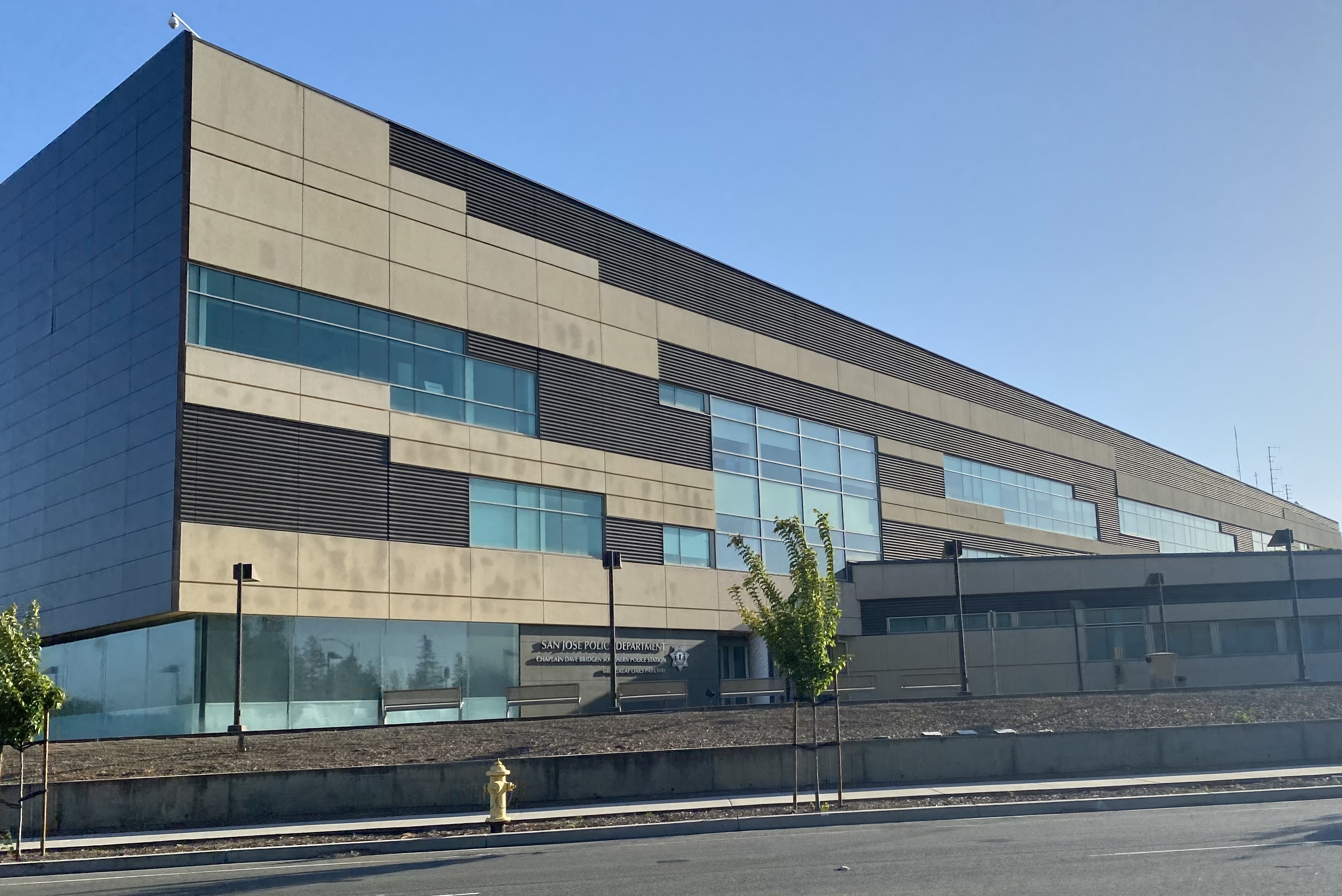
San Jose PD Southern Police Station

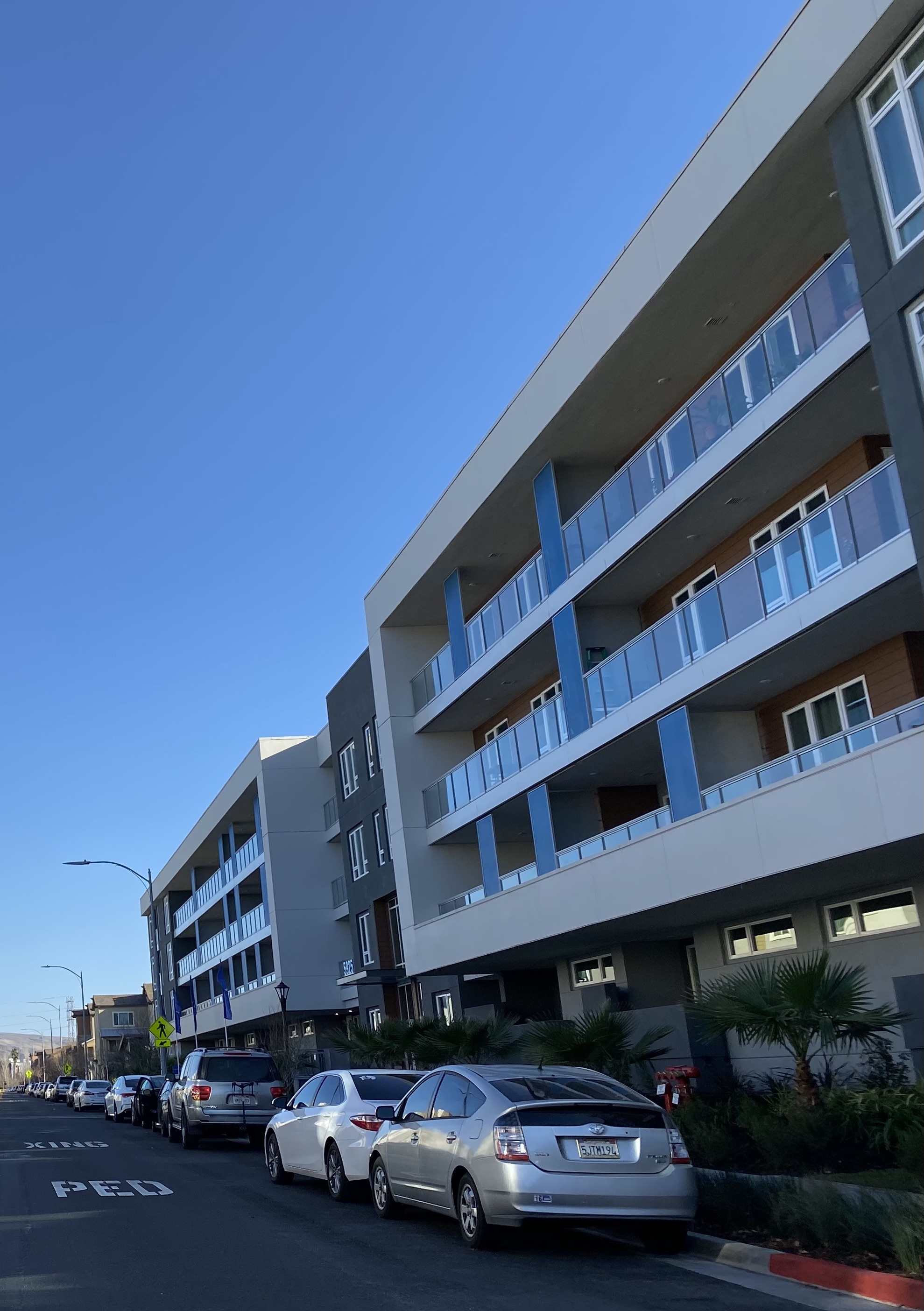
Apartments on Charlotte

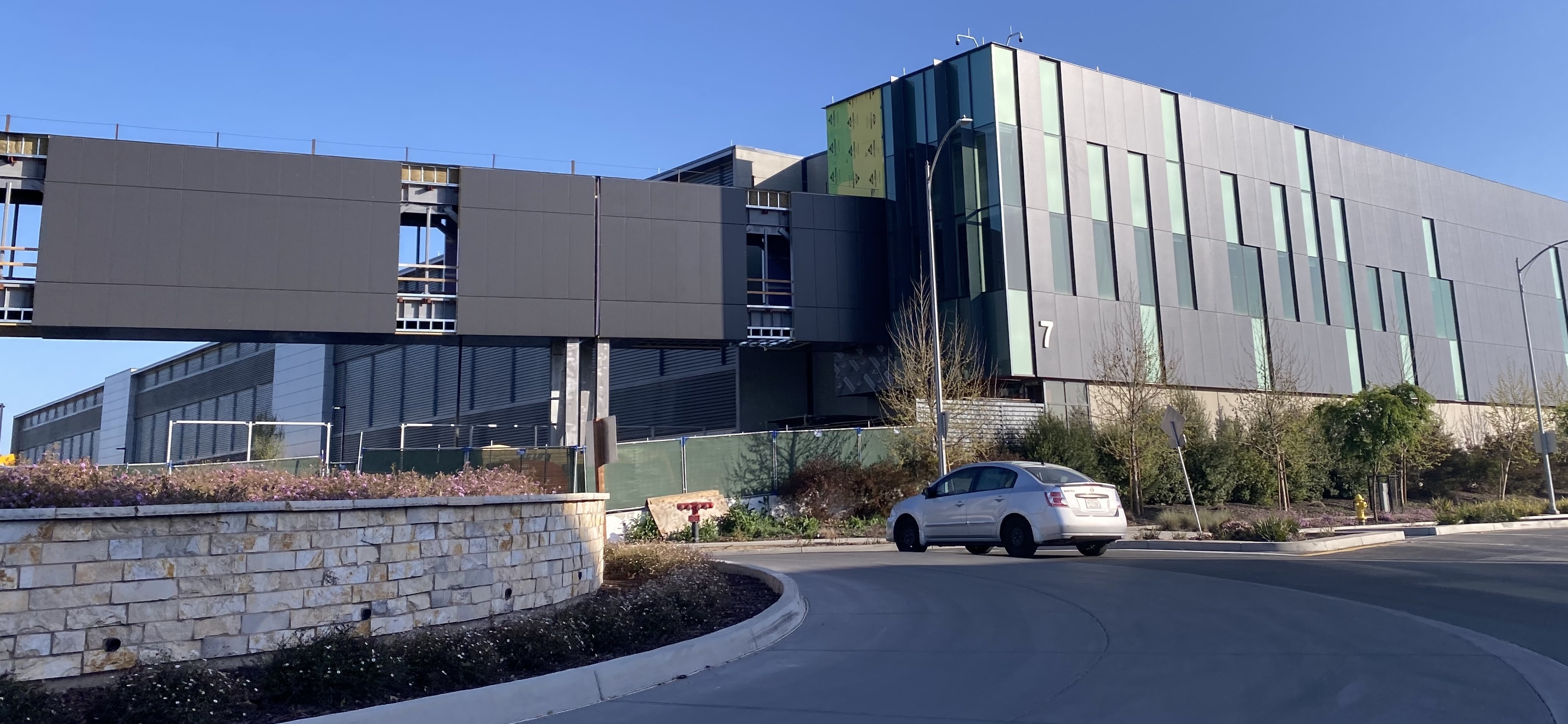
Equinix San Jose campus

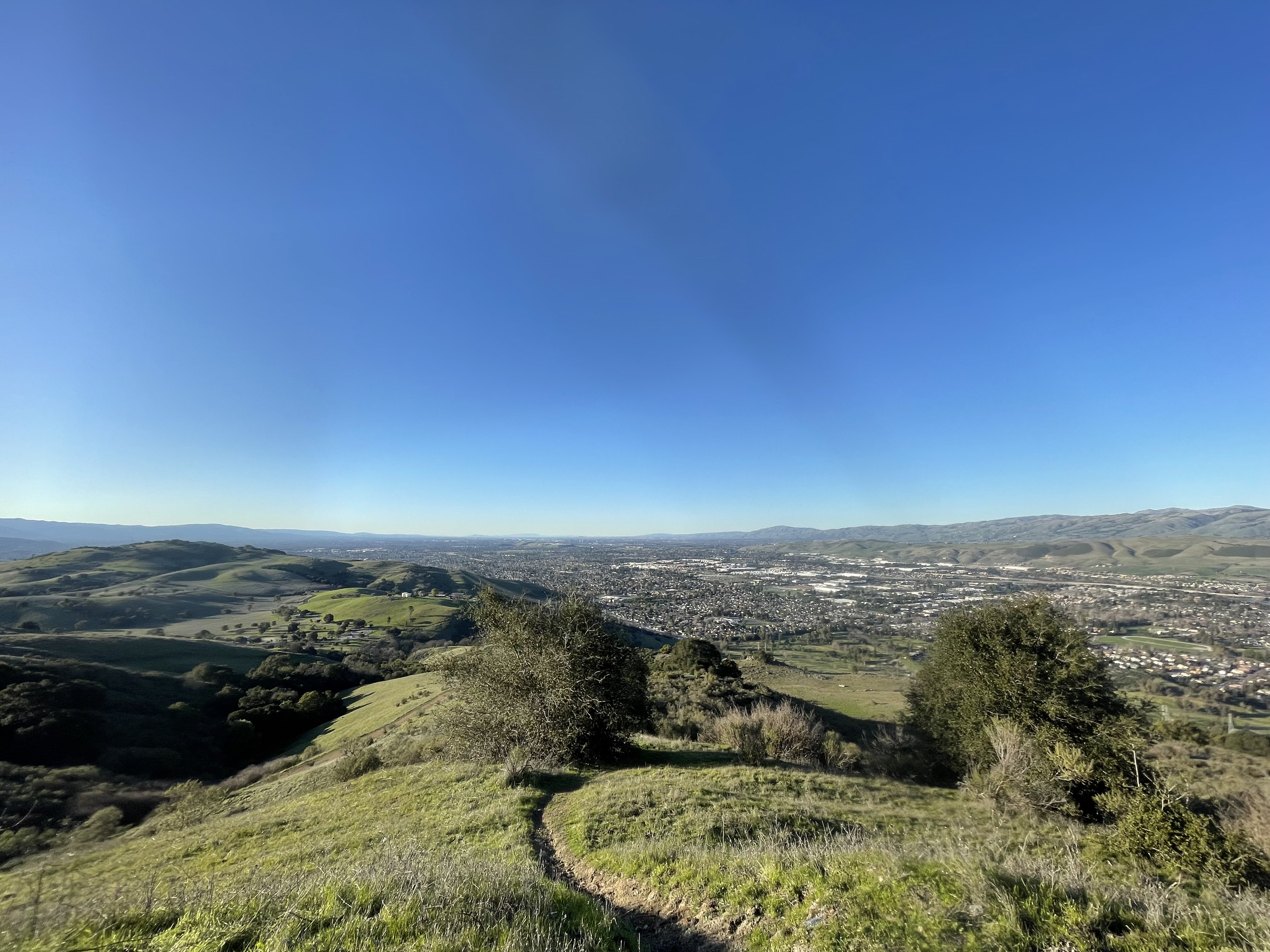
Santa Teresa as seen from the top of Coyote Peak
