= Kaiser San Jose Medical Center =

Hospital in Santa Teresa, San Jose, California

- Kaiser Permanente

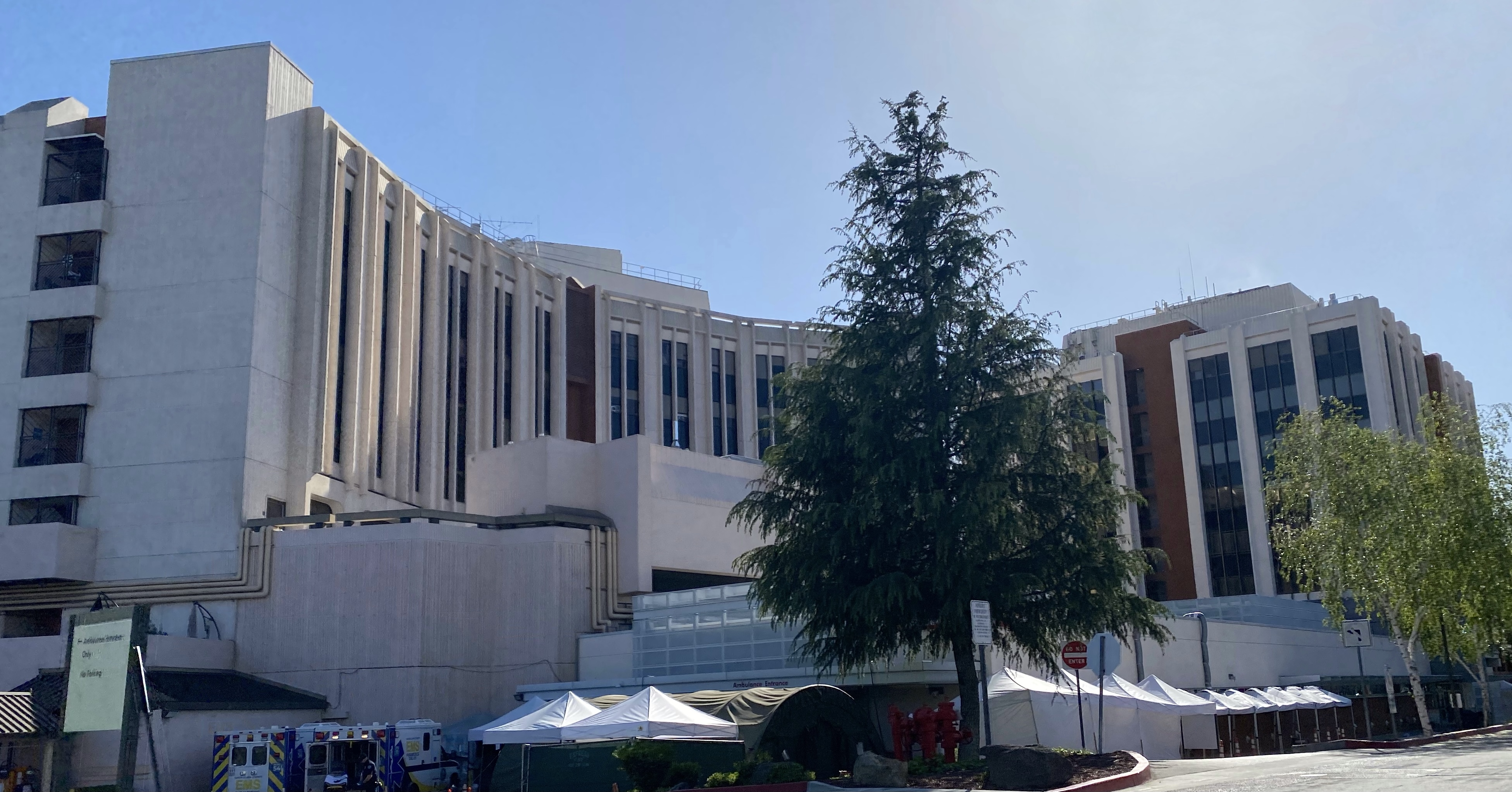
- Kaiser San Jose Medical Center in the Santa Teresa district of South San Jose

Geography
- Location: San Jose, Santa Clara County, California, United States
- Coordinates: 37.239392°N 121.800795°W

Services
- Beds: 242

History
- Founded: 1974

Links
- Lists: Hospitals in California

Kaiser San Jose Medical Center, also known as Kaiser Santa Teresa, is a Kaiser Permanente hospital in San Jose, California, located in the Santa Teresa district of South San Jose. Kaiser San Jose has been ranked within the top 50 best hospitals in the United States by Healthgrades in 2019, 2020, 2021, and 2023.

== History ==
Kaiser Permanente opened the San Jose Medical Center in 1974, originally as a medical offices site. The building housed 247 beds and roughly 822 employees. In 1982, the campus opened the Gilroy Medical Offices site, serving the South Valley region of the Santa Clara Valley.

The campus has been praised as one of the best hospitals in the country. In 2010, Kaiser San Jose was included in the Leapfrog Group's ranking of top hospitals. Kaiser San Jose was also ranked 4 out of 5 stars by medicare.gov. Leapfrog Group gave the Kaiser San Jose campus an "A" safety grade. Since 2016, Kaiser San Jose has hosted a farmers market on its campus, as part of its initiative to promote healthier eating habits. The farmers market was temporarily put on hold during the COVID-19 pandemic, but has since resumed.

Owing to its location within the high-tech influence of Silicon Valley, Kaiser San Jose's medical training program has often included innovative practices and equipment, such as robotic patients for medical training purposes. Starting in 2010, life-like robots nicknamed "SimMan" have been used to help new students train at the learning lab at the Kaiser San Jose campus. The program allowed for students to practice medical emergency procedures in a risk-free environment.

=== COVID-19 pandemic ===
During the COVID-19 pandemic, Kaiser San Jose was the center of a large coronavirus breakout on Christmas Day 2020, which resulted in more than 100 positive cases and the death of a receptionist, one of the largest outbreaks in the Bay Area. The Santa Clara County Health Department fined the hospital $43,000 for delays in reporting the outbreak, and Cal-OSHA fined the hospital another $85,000 from prior violations.

=== New building ===
Since 2024, a new six story, 303-bed medical facility, as well as a five level parking structure, has been under construction at the Kaiser San Jose. The project is expected to be completed by 2029. The new building will replace the original hospital, and it is being built on a former parking lot in the southwest corner of the campus, while the parking garage is set to be built across Camino Verde Drive, with a capacity of 1,040 spaces. A new California state law, SB 1953, requires all hospitals to upgrade their facilities in order to be able to withstand earthquakes, or replace old buildings by 2030. Construction of the new facility is expected to be completed by August 2029, with the building expected to open to patients in early 2030. Once completed, the former hospital will be demolished.

== Facilities ==
Kaiser San Jose is located nearby the West Valley Freeway (CA-85) as well as U.S. Route 101. The hospital is served by the Cottle VTA station to the north and the Santa Teresa VTA station to the east. Both stations currently serve as a Park & Ride stop for Kaiser Permanente employees, who are shuttled to and from the hospital while the new building is under construction.

Kaiser San Jose also operates multiple medical offices on Cottle Road, across State Route 85, a facility on Via Del Oro, east of the main campus, and medical offices site in Gilroy, California.

== Gallery ==
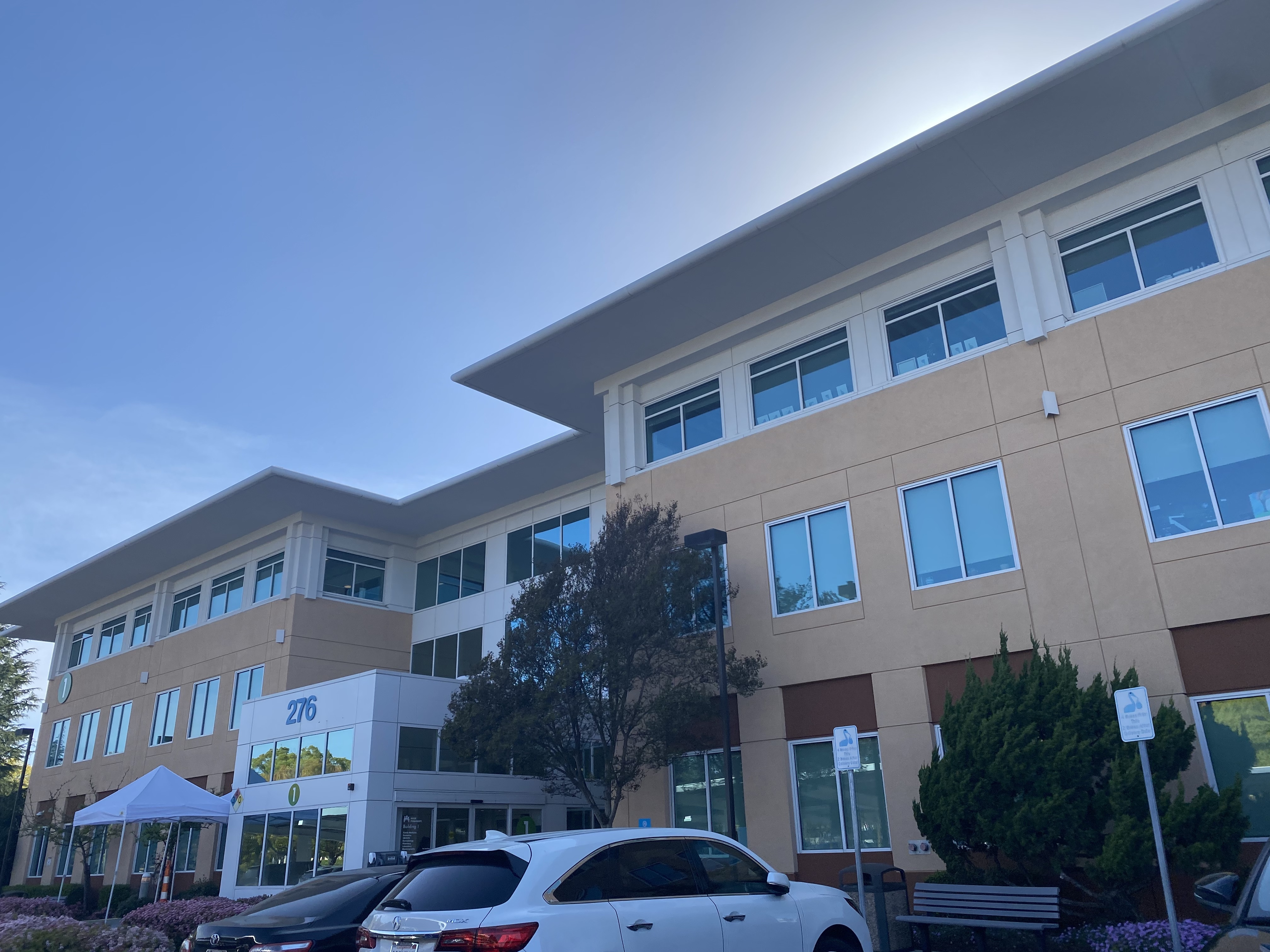
Pediatrics Center

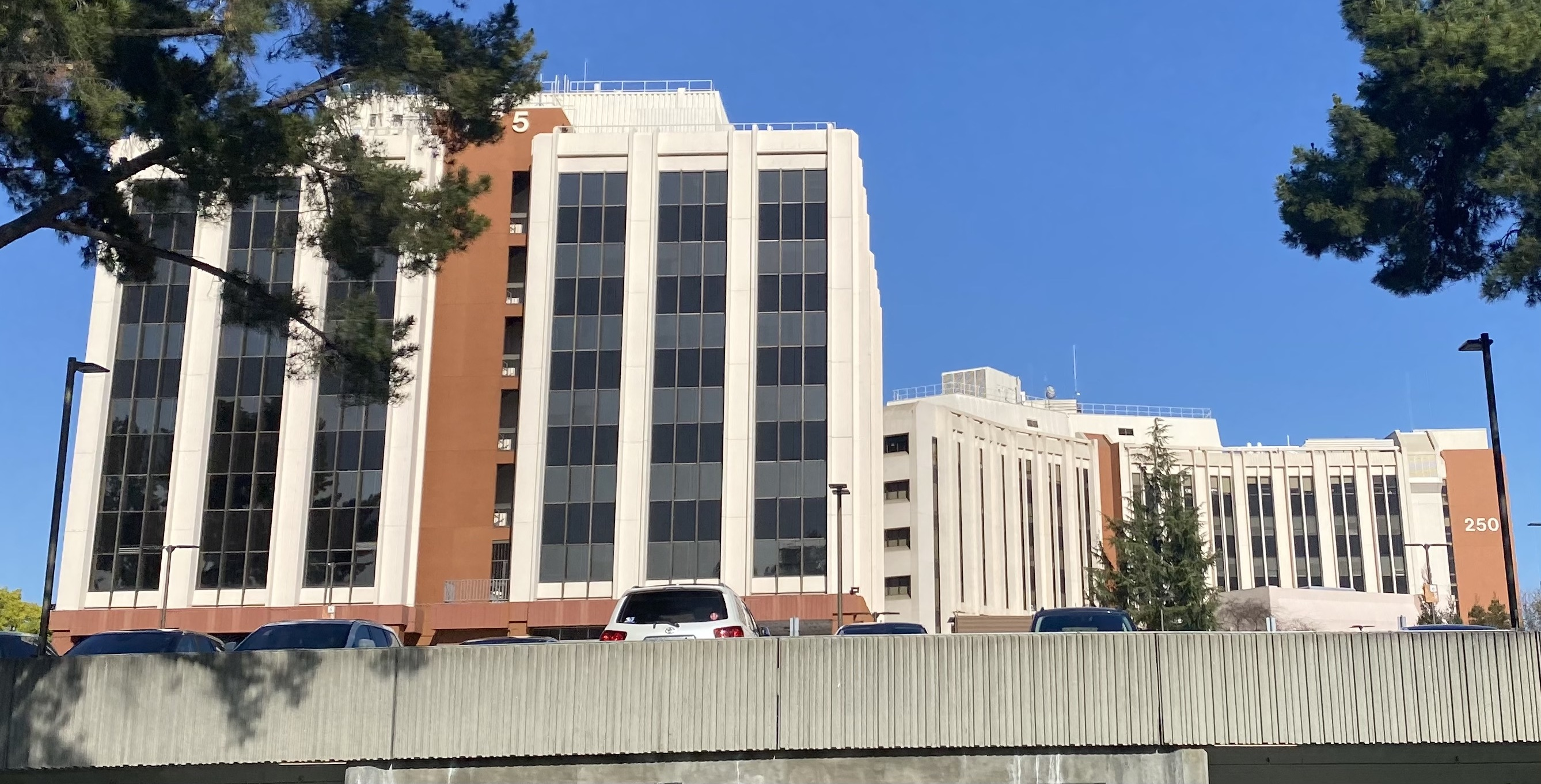
Urgent Care Building

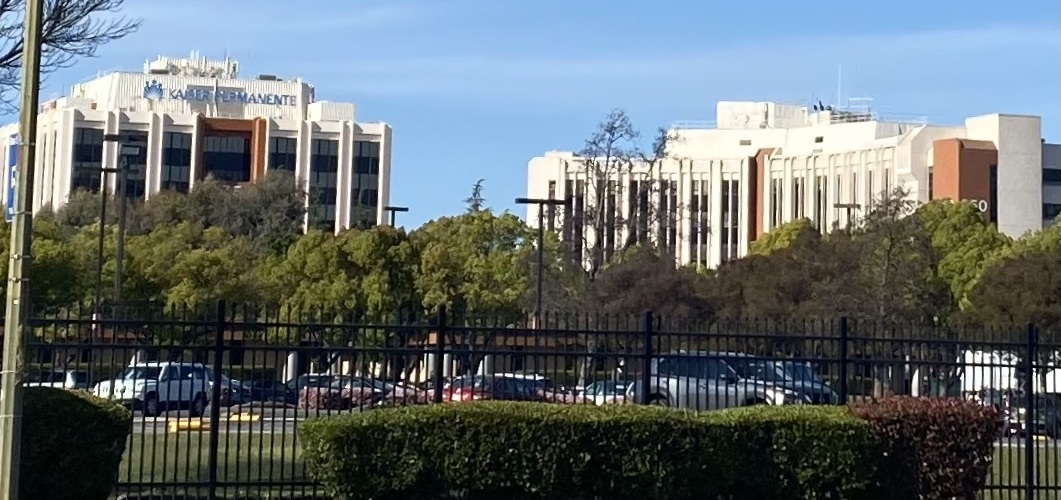
View of the main campus

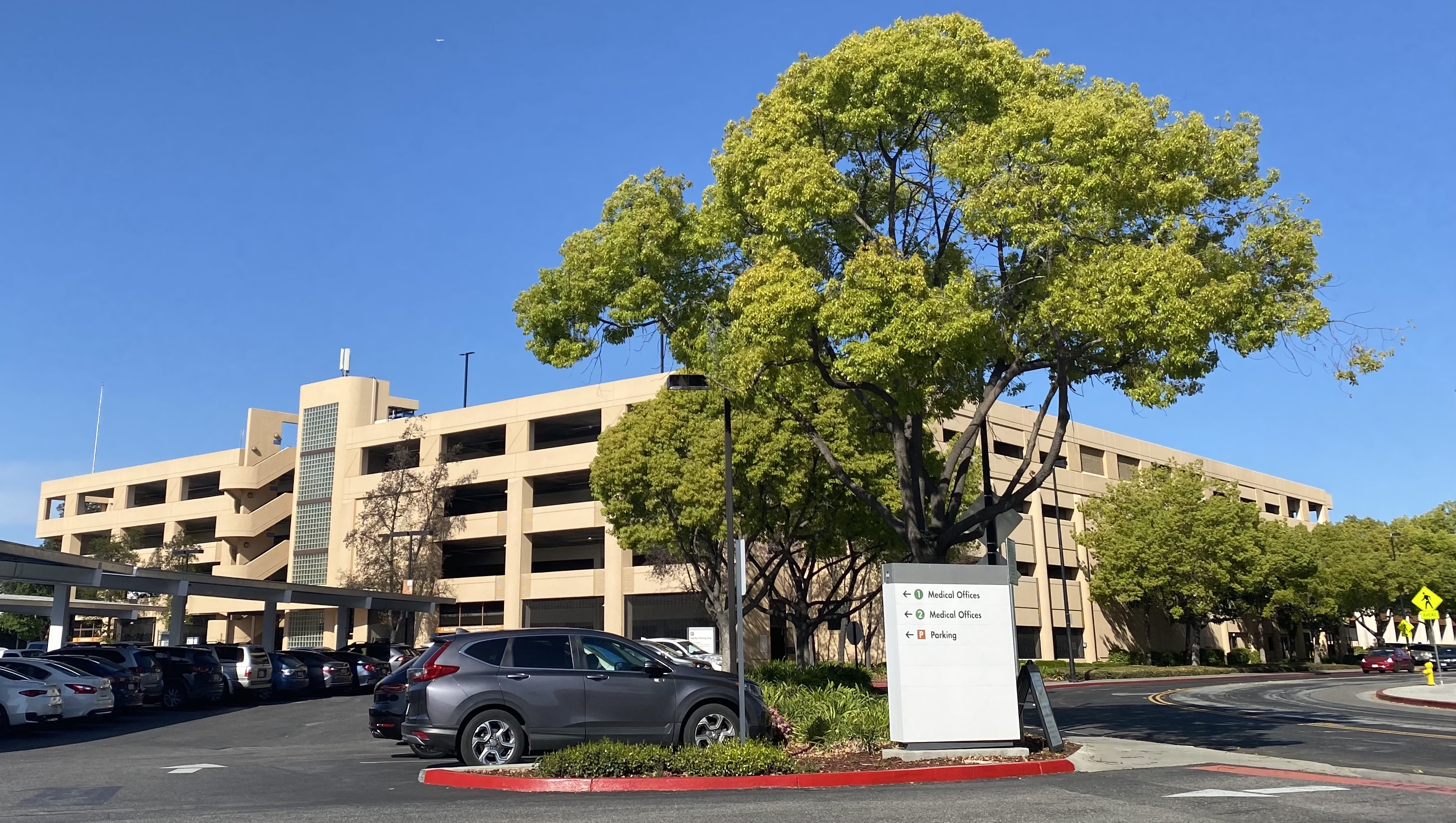
North parking garage
