= Santa Teresa County Park =

County park in Santa Clara County

Coordinates: 37.2132°N 121.7871°W

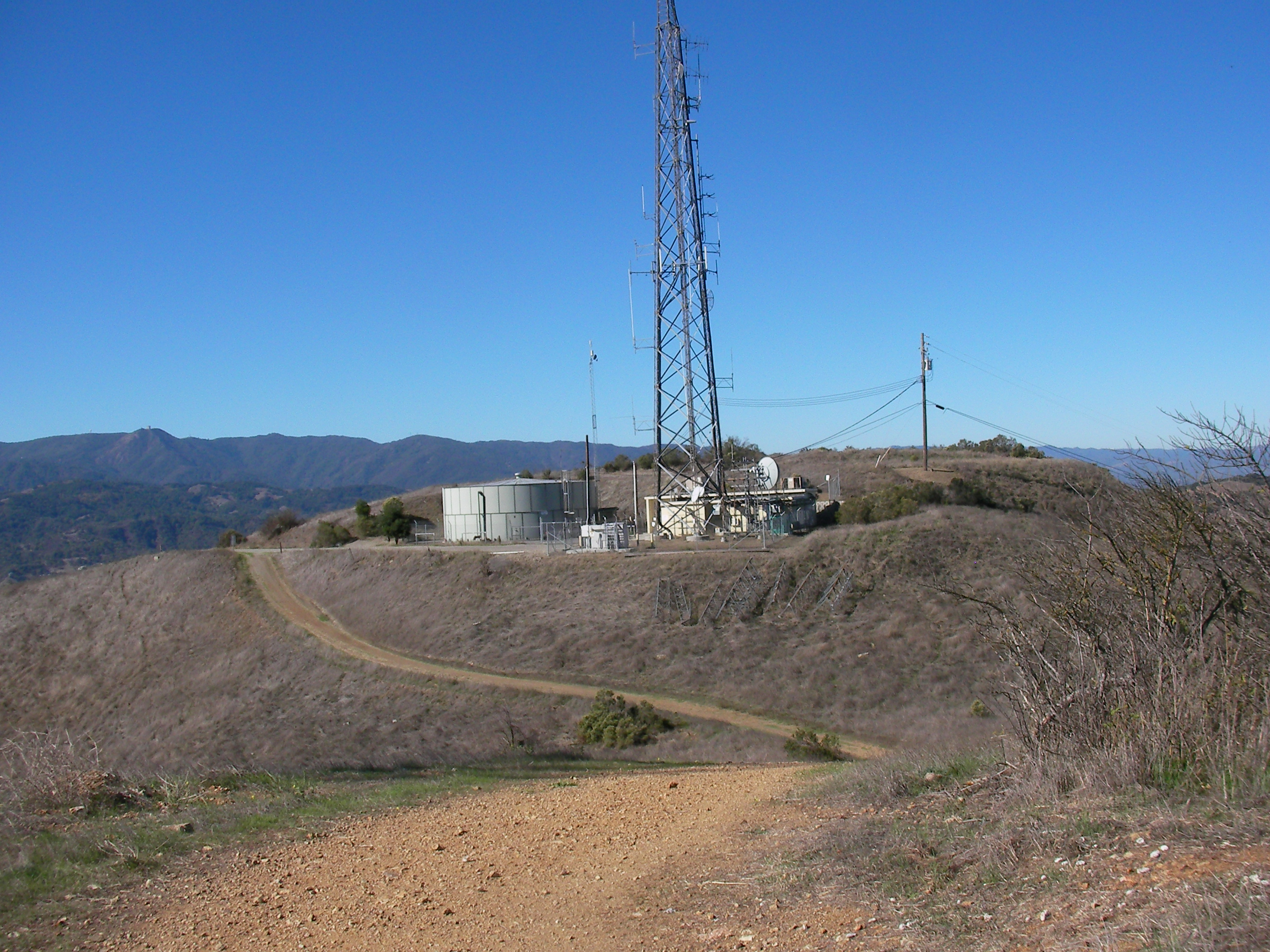
Clockwise from top left: Coyote Peak in July 2006, Santa Teresa County Park in May 2003, IBM Almaden in October 2007, and Coyote Peak in 2007

Santa Teresa County Park is an 1,673-acre (6.77 km^{2}) park in the Santa Teresa neighborhood of San Jose, California, located within the Santa Teresa Hills

== Park description ==
It is operated by the Santa Clara County Parks and Recreation Department. Most of the park consists of non-native grassland and mixed oak woodland. Native wildflowers displays are common in late winter and early spring in the serpentine soil in the northwest and southern sections of the park. Elevations range from 64 m (210 ft) in the northeast section to 352 m (1155 ft) at Coyote Peak (in Santa Clara County, adjacent to the park) in the eastern section. The park offers over 17 miles of unpaved trails for equestrian, hiking and bicycle use. Some of the trails are steep near Coyote Peak. Picnicking by groups and families is a popular activity in Santa Teresa County Park, namely in the Pueblo Day Use area.

The park also contains a picnic area in the Pueblo Day Use Area, an 18-hole golf course operated by a concessionaire, and an archery range.

The main entrance to the park is a large parking lot by the Pueblo Day Use Area and is accessible via Bernal Road from the east. Other entrances with limited or no parking include the Bernal-Joice-Gulnac Ranch in the northwest, an entrance from Avenida Espana on the northeast, and the Stile Ranch entrance from Almaden Valley.

The IBM Research - Almaden Facility is situated just outside the park's boundaries. The site, built in 1985, was meant to be an addition of the San Jose Research Laboratory, which was built in 1952. Santa Clara County Parks and Recreation Department received the land for the park from IBM in 1980 after IBM purchased the land for the new facility from the Joice family.
