= Santa Teresa Hills =

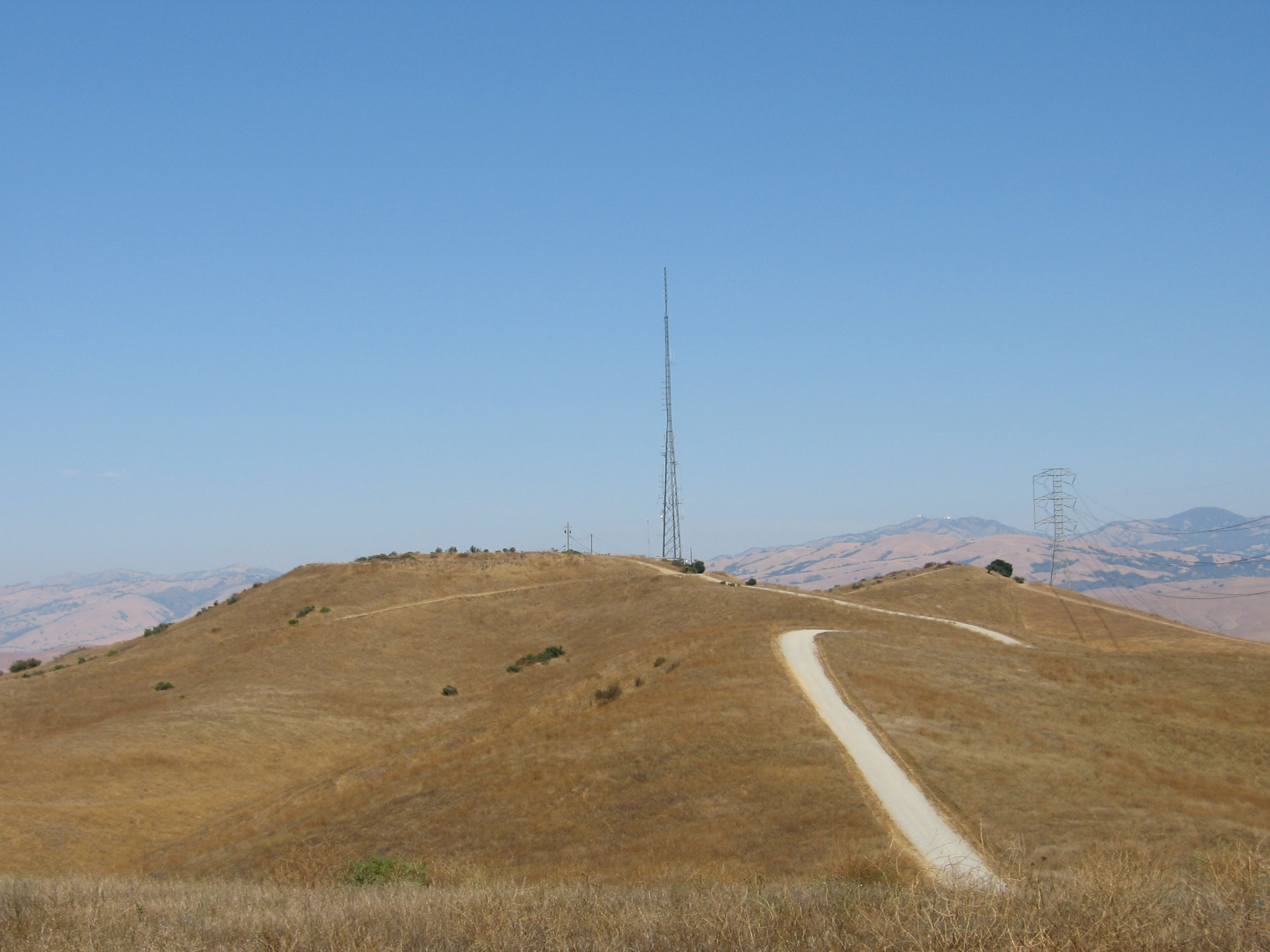
- Coyote Peak

Highest point
- Elevation: 1,027 ft (313 m)

Geography
- Location within California Location within the United States
- Country: United States
- State: California
- District: Santa Clara County
- Range coordinates: 37°12′58.800″N 121°48′17.825″W
- Topo map: USGS Santa Teresa Hills

The Santa Teresa Hills are a range of mountains in Santa Clara County, California, located primarily in the city of San Jose. They separate the San Jose neighborhoods of Almaden Valley to the west and Santa Teresa to the east.

== Geography ==
The range runs south of San Jose and is about 7 miles long. The New Almaden hills and greater Santa Cruz Mountains span south. Notable peaks include Coyote Peak and Bernal Hill.

Notable bodies of water include Santa Teresa Creek, which runs west down through the southern portion of the hills. It soon joins Arroyo Calero, which originates from Calero Reservoir in New Almaden. Arroyo Calero then joins Alamitos Creek, which flows through Almaden Lake at the western end of the Santa Teresa Hills, exiting eventually to the Guadalupe River and then to the San Francisco Bay at Alviso. Santa Teresa Spring emerges at the base of the north side of the hills, in the nearby Santa Teresa County Park.

== Geology ==
Serpentinized ultramafic rock from the Jurassic, sandstone, mudstone, shale, and limestone from the lower Eocene, and Upper Cretaceous Franciscan Complex rock containing chert and basaltic volcanic rock make up most of the geologic structure of the Santa Teresa Hills. The hills contain local thrust faults, while the Shannon Fault Zone cuts south.

=== Mining ===
Like in the nearby historic New Almaden mines, mining occurred in the Santa Teresa Hills since the early 20th century, though with much lower consistency and production. Limestone was quarried since 1915 for use in fertilizer and sugar refining, and chert was quarried for local road metal. Sandstone was quarried from 1866 to 1906 and was used in the construction of Stanford University and several public buildings in San Francisco and San Jose. Rocks quarried here were also decoratively desirable.

Past mines include the Bernal Mine, which has been inactive since 1918, and the Santa Teresa Mine, both of which were quicksilver mines. Like New Almaden, the Santa Teresa Hills contain “hilos,” or small tension fractures in silicate-carbonate rock containing veins of dolomite, quartz, and cinnabar, though in much lower quantity.

== Cultural history ==
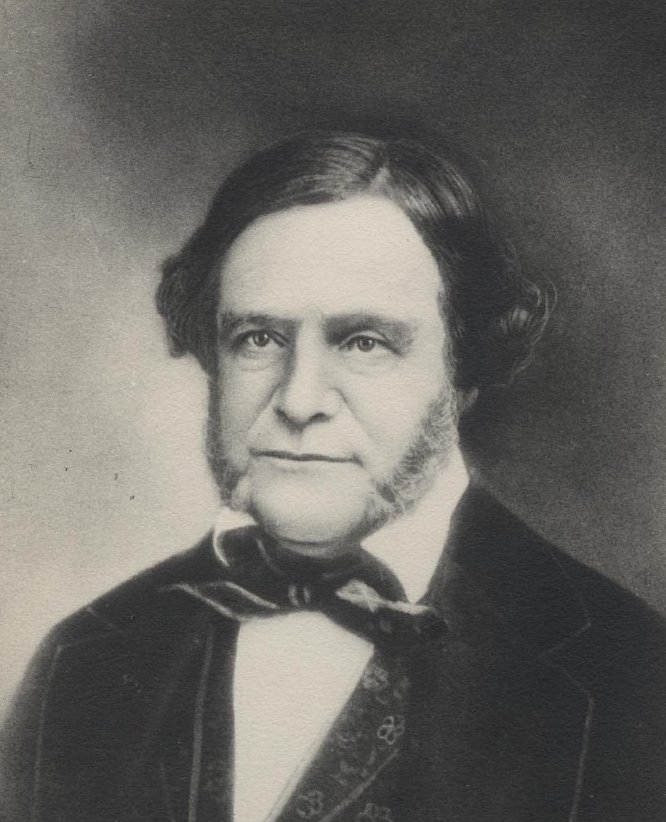
Don Bruno Bernal, son of José Joaquín Bernal, ran the ranch after the death of his father.

Ancestors of today's Muwekma Ohlone Tribe were among the first people to live in the Santa Teresa Hills area, with one major settlement at Santa Teresa Spring about 3000 years ago. The spring was a reliable freshwater source and a sacred site to the Muwekma Ohlone, who believe that the spring had healing properties.

=== Rancho Santa Teresa ===
In 1826, José Joaquín Bernal, a former soldier in the Mexican Army, settled near Santa Teresa Spring with his family and established Rancho Santa Teresa. The Santa Teresa Hills were part of the San Jose Pueblo Tract II, between Rancho Santa Teresa to the north and Alamitos Creek at the southern base. Rancho Santa Teresa started off as a 9,647-acre land grant by the Mexican government in 1834. Due to the California Land Act of 1851, the rancho was reduced to only 400 acres by the 1870s. Bernal's descendants continued to run the ranch, which produced cattle, fruit and hay. The Bernal Mine, Bernal Marl Fertilizer Company, and Santa Teresa Spring Water Company were also started by Bernal's descendants. The ranch eventually became Bernal-Gulnac-Joice Ranch, and was operated into the 1980s.

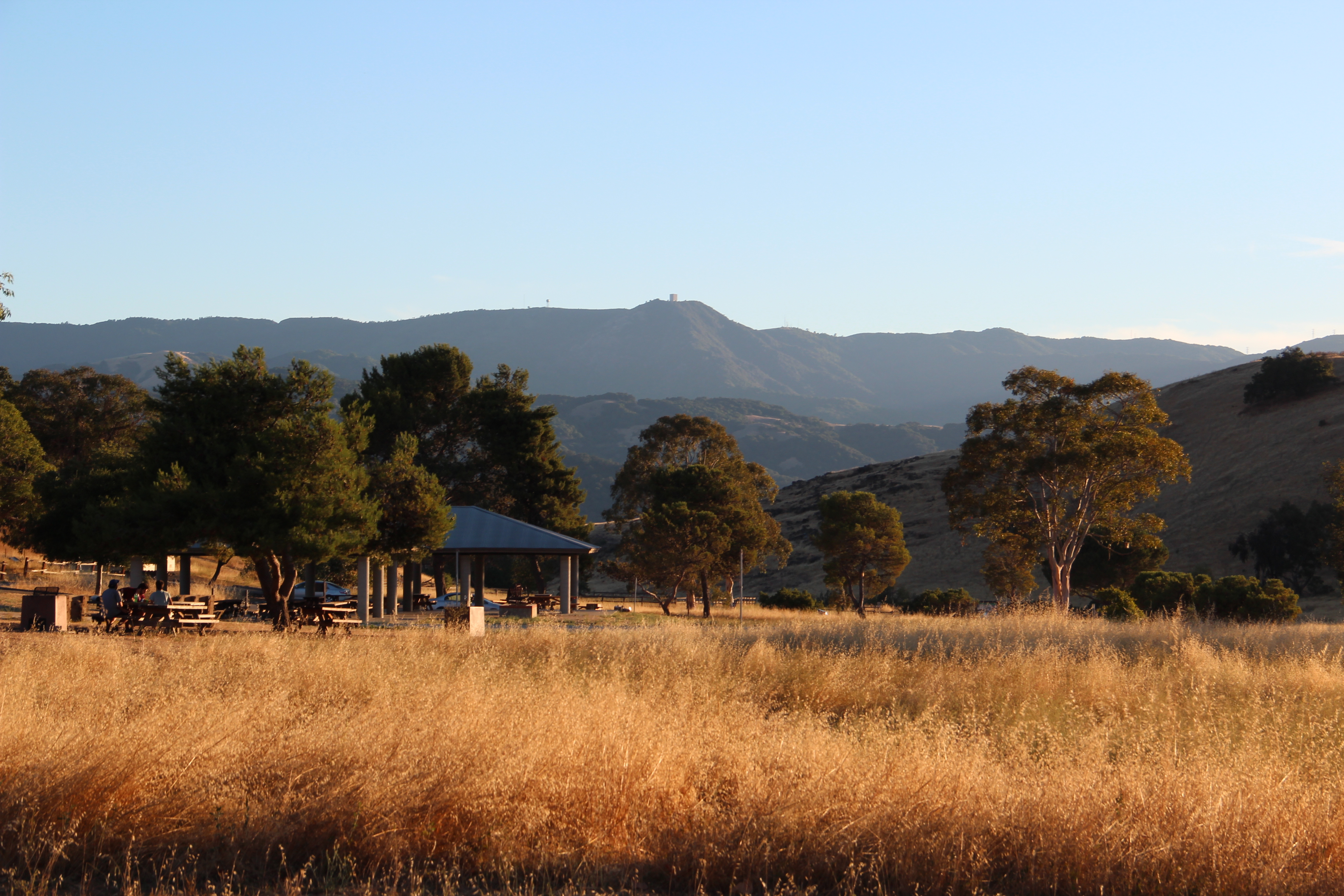
Santa Teresa County Park

By the 1990s, a large portion of the Santa Teresa Hills were purchased by IBM to build a new research center in the Santa Teresa hills. Most of the land was donated to Santa Clara County as part of Santa Teresa County Park, which now covers about 1,673 acres. Today, a ranch house and other historic buildings remain at the base of the hills as part of the park. The IBM Almaden Research Center, which opened in 1986, is located just west of the park.

== Ecology ==
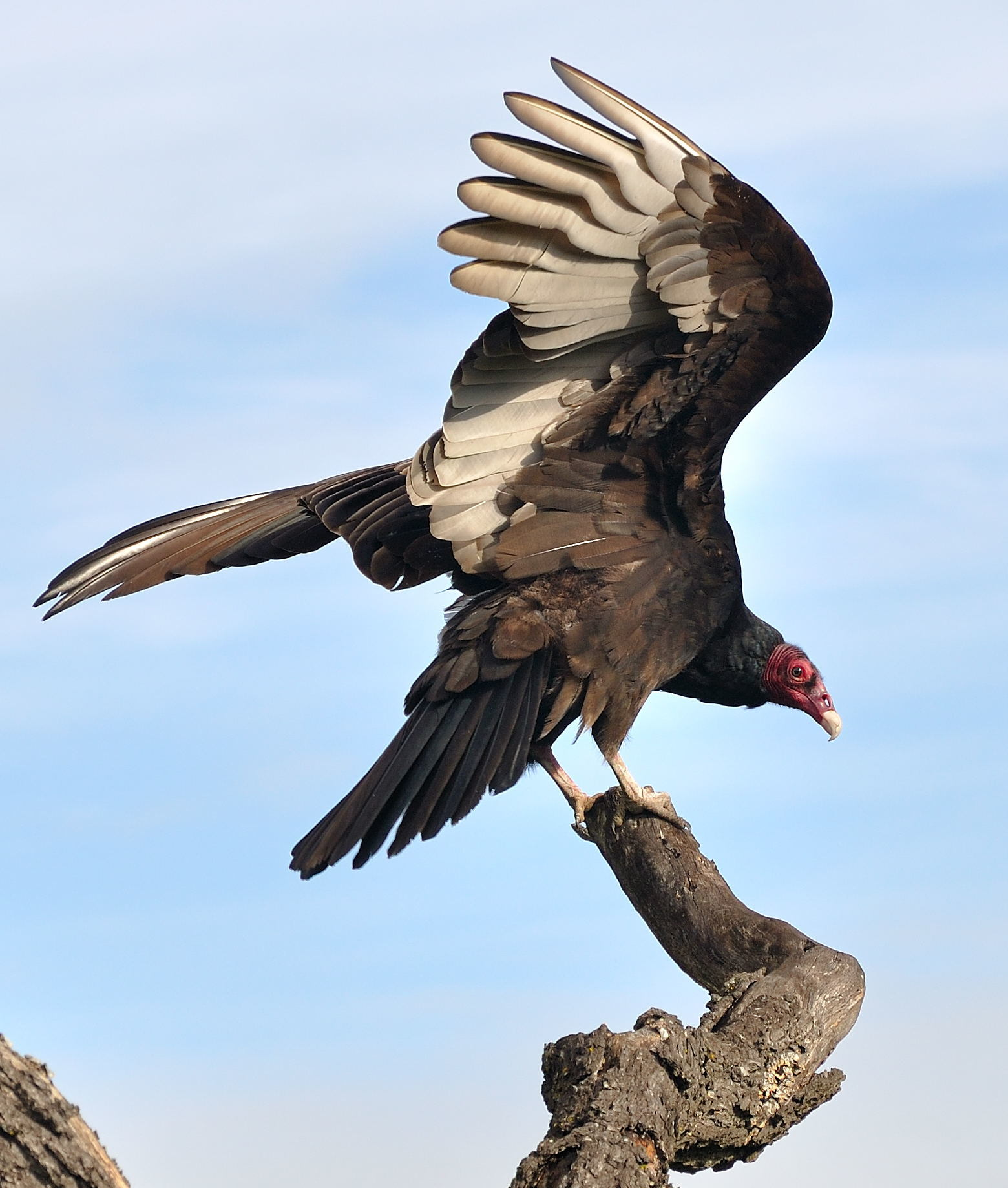
Turkey vulture in Santa Teresa County Park

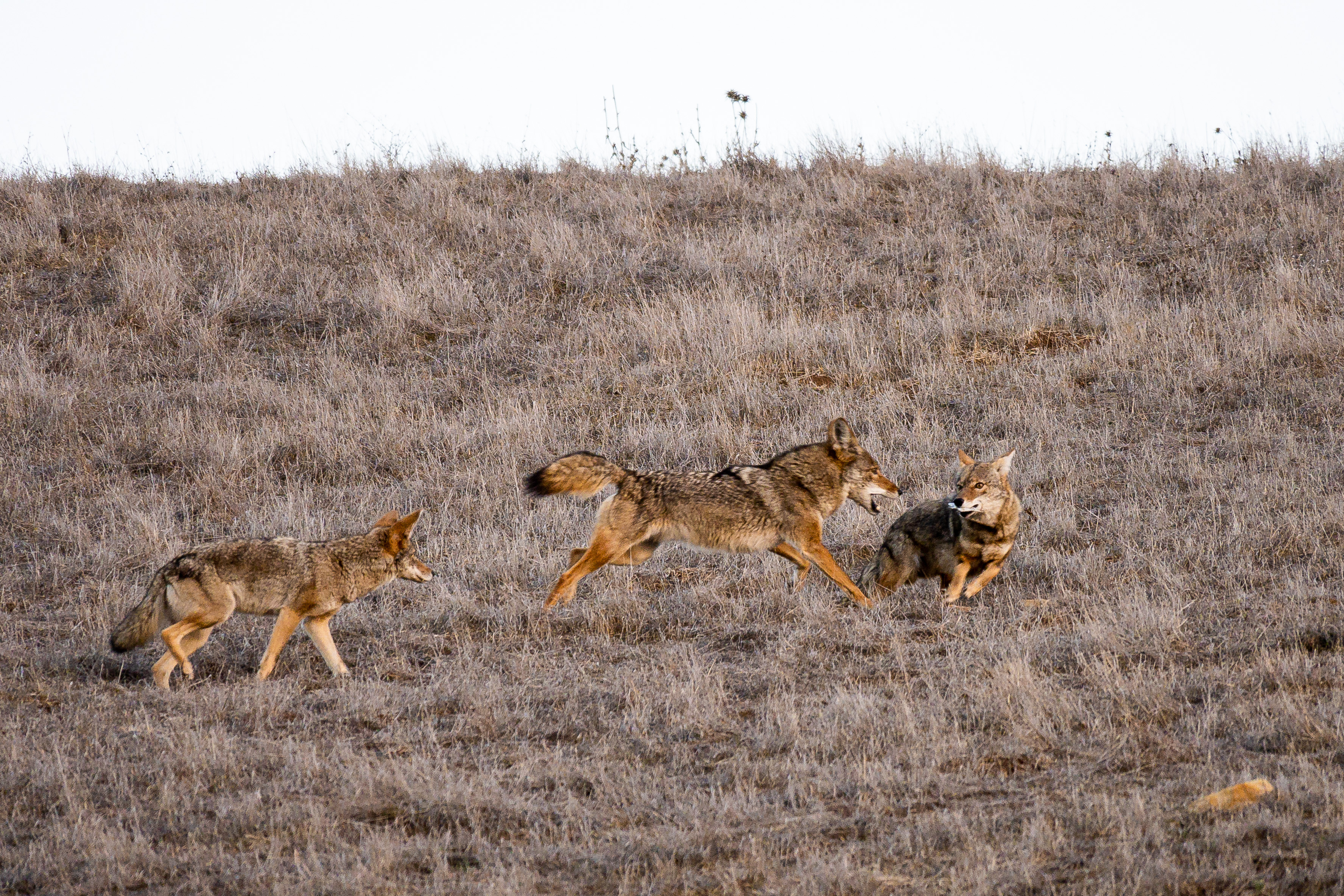
Coyotes in Santa Teresa County Park

The Santa Teresa Hills contain chaparral, annual grassland, mixed oak woodland, and mixed riparian forests. In areas that are less serpentine, non-native annual Eurasian grasses, including wild oats, soft chess, and Italian ryegrass, dominate over native grasses and forbs. Serpentine soils are incredibly poor in essential plant nutrients like nitrogen and have high concentrations of heavy metals. As such, the serpentine composition found in the Santa Teresa Hills provides an essential habitat for native plants that can tolerate these conditions from competition with non-native grasses. Native butchgrasses include California oatgrass, purple needlegrass, and Idaho fescue. Native forbs include filaree, true clovers, and dwarf plantain. Mixed oak woodland species include Coast live oak, valley oak, California buckeye, California bay, and blue oak.

The Santa Teresa Hills are a critical habitat for the threatened Bay checkerspot butterfly, whose primary host plant is the dwarf plantain. Other animals include deer, coyotes, bobcats, wild turkeys, California quail, red-shouldered hawks, turkey vultures, and rattlesnakes.
