= Rancho Santa Teresa =

Mexican land grant in California

Coordinates: 37.250°N 121.810°W

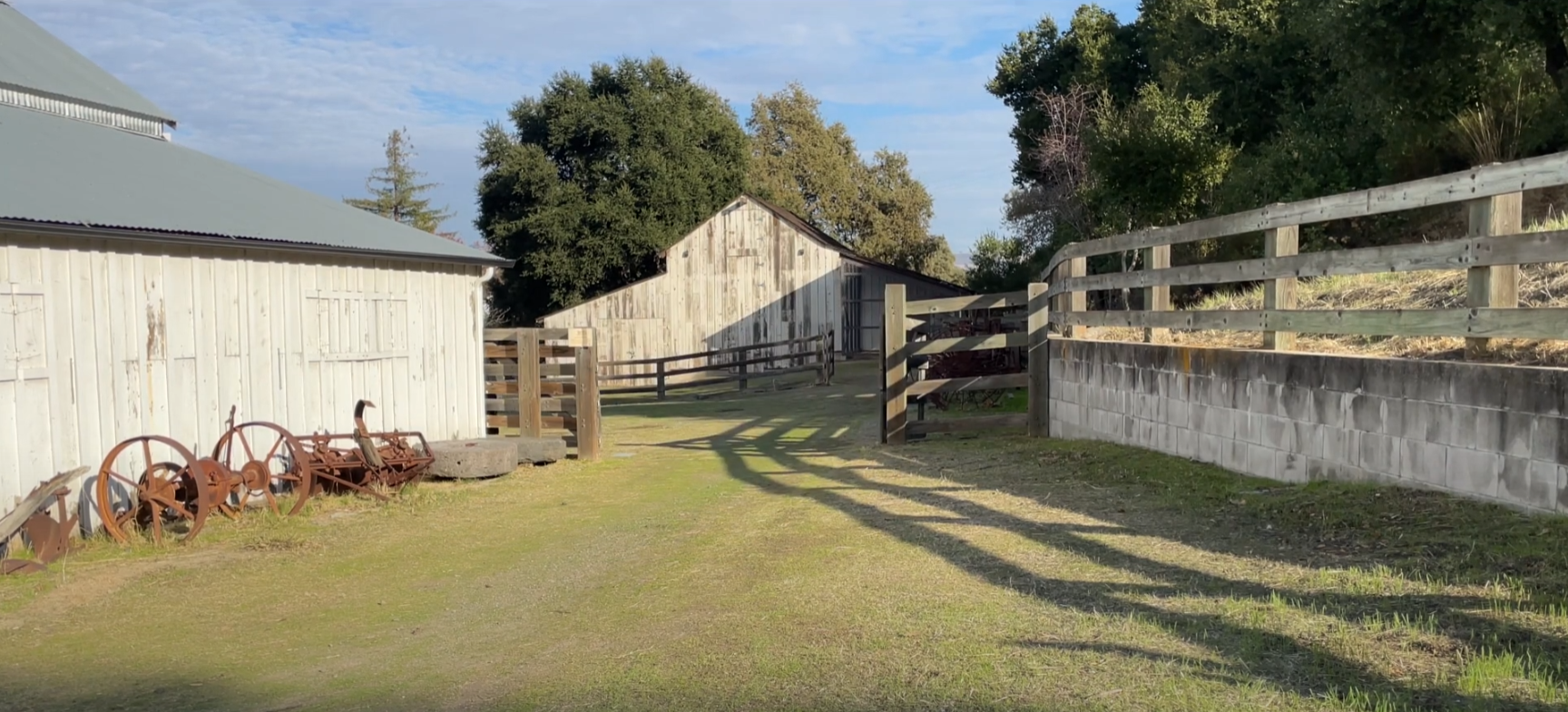
A barn at Rancho Santa Teresa circa 2024

Rancho Santa Teresa was a 9,647-acre (39.04 km^{2}) Mexican land grant in present-day Santa Clara County, California given in 1834 by Governor José Figueroa to José Joaquín Bernal. The grant extended west from Coyote Creek to the Santa Teresa Hills, and included present-day Santa Teresa.

== History ==
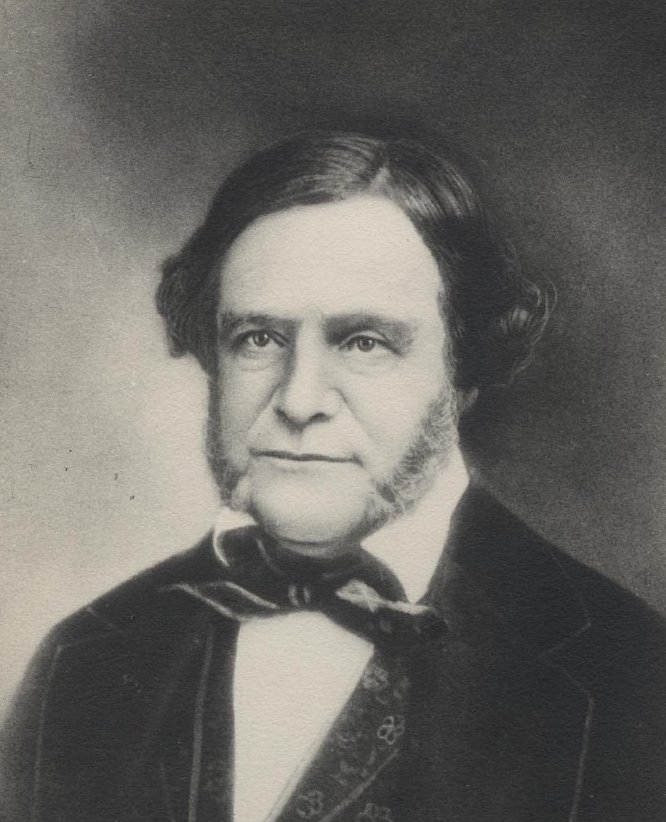
Don Bruno Bernal ran Rancho Santa Teresa after the death of José Joaquín Bernal, his father.

José Joaquín Bernal (1762–1837), a member of the 1776 De Anza Expedition, was a soldier at the Presidio of San Francisco and by 1805 at the Pueblo of San José. In 1819 he retired from the army, and in 1826 he settled his family of eleven children near Santa Teresa spring, ten miles south of San Jose.

In 1837, Jose Joaquin Bernal died, leaving an estate to be divided equally among his widow and his ten children. Four of his children were granted Rancho Valle de San Jose in 1839. In 1844, the Treaty of Santa Teresa was signed at the rancho by Governor Micheltorena and former Governor Alvarado.

With the cession of California to the United States following the Mexican-American War, the 1848 Treaty of Guadalupe Hidalgo provided that the land grants would be honored. As required by the Land Act of 1851, a claim was filed by Agustín Bernal, son of José Joaquín Bernal, with the Public Land Commission in 1853. The grant was one square league, and 4,460 acres (18 km^{2}) was confirmed by the U.S. District Court. But the 1867 official survey and patent to Agustín Bernal in 1867 was for 9,647 acres (39 km^{2}).

In 1855, another of José Joaquín Bernal's sons, Bruno Bernal (1799–1863) moved to his Rancho El Alisal, leaving the ranch to his sons Ygnacio (1841–1906), Francisco and Antonio.

The ranch was passed down through descendants of Jose Joaquin Bernal. In 1858, Carlos Maria Gulnac, son of William Gulnac, married Joaquin's granddaughter (Ygnacio's sister) Rufina Bernal. Their daughter, Susan Gulnac, married Patrick Joice. The Joice family ran the ranch until it was sold to IBM for IBM Research – Almaden in 1980. Santa Clara County acquired most of the Joice land, including the historic buildings, from IBM for Santa Teresa County Park.

== Historic sites of the Rancho ==
- Rancho Santa Teresa Historic District/Santa Teresa County Park.
- Bernal Adobe Site.
- Santa Teresa Spring. Ygnacio Bernal's son, Pedro, established the Santa Teresa Springs Water Company around 1910.
- Bernal-Gulnac-Joice Ranch/Santa Teresa County Park.
