= Oak Grove School District (San Jose, California) =

School district in Santa Clara County, California

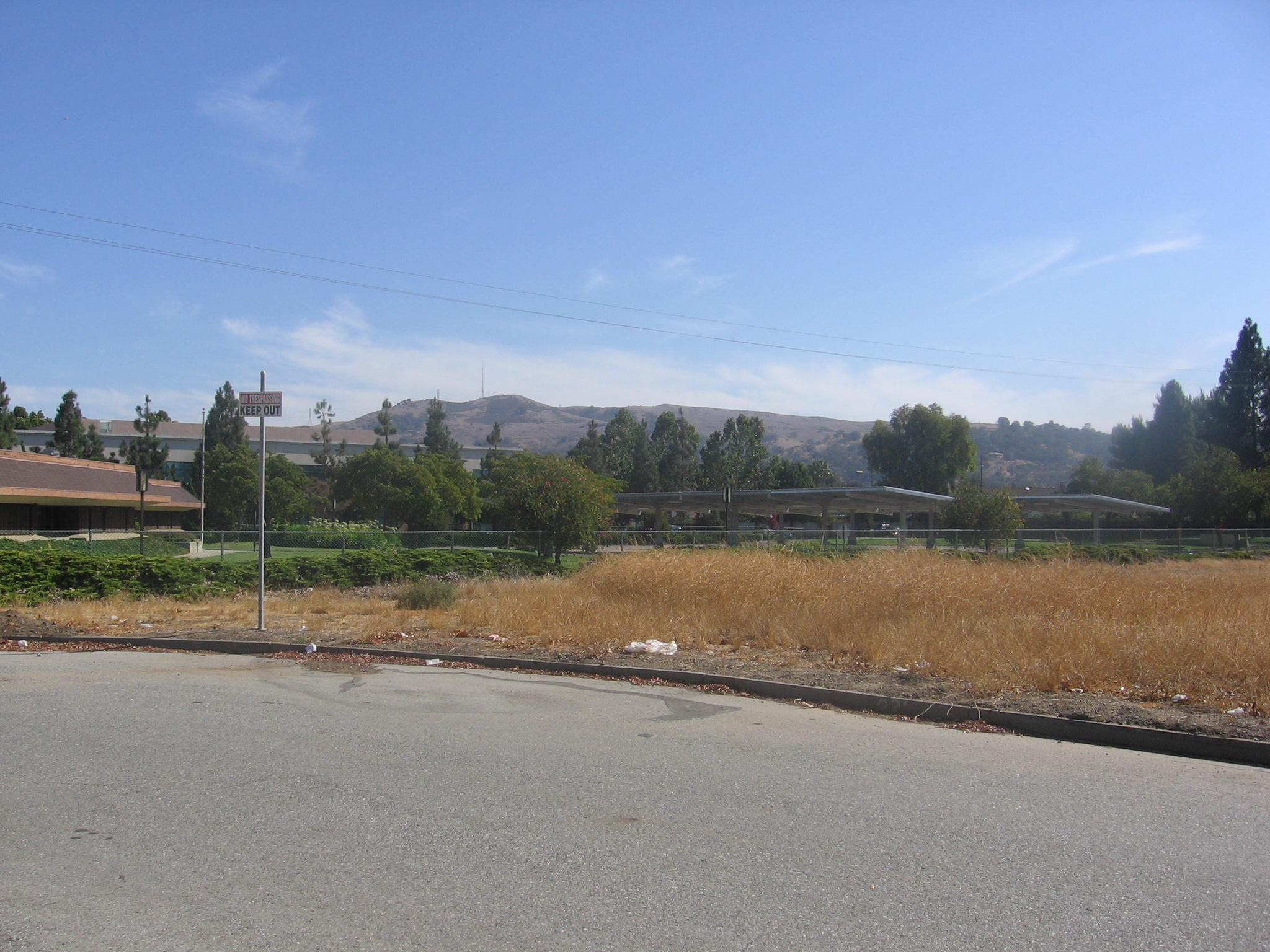
- Oak Grove School District headquarters in San Jose, CA

Address
- 6578 Santa Teresa Blvd. San Jose, California, 95119; United States

District information
- Type: Public
- Grades: K–8
- NCES District ID: 0627810

Students and staff
- Students: 9,362 (2020–2021)
- Teachers: 395.32 (FTE)
- Staff: 394.73 (FTE)
- Student–teacher ratio: 23.68:1

Other information
- Website: www.ogsd.net

The Oak Grove School District is a school district in San Jose, California, United States, serving the South San Jose region. It operates 15 elementary schools (K-6) and three intermediate schools (7-8, unless otherwise noted). The district has more than 600 teachers (FTEs), serving more than 9,800 students.

== District employee information ==
This list shows the current members working for the district.

Current employees
Name	Position
Ivan Chaidez	Superintendent
Amy Boles	Assistant Superintendent of Human Resources
Jenay Enna	Assistant Superintendent of Educational Services
Mark Evans	Assistant Superintendent of Business Services
Patricia Mondragon-Doty, Genvieve Dorsey	Director(s) of Educational Services
Luciana Park	Director of Special Education
Terri Anaya	Director of Child Nutrition Services

=== Board of trustees ===
Current board members
Name	Position	Date hired	Date of term expiration
Nancy Yue	President	Appointed 2021	2026
Frances Herbert	Vice president	2024	2028
Otila Salazar Torres	Board member	2024	2028
Diego Martinez	Board member	2022	2026
Kaushik C. Joglekar	Board member	2025	2026

== Schools ==
Current school facts
School	Students	FTE teachers	Student/teacher ratio	Principal	Opening date	Notes/type of school
(Alex) Anderson Elementary School	514	25	24.1	Sarah Kates-March	July 1, 1980	Traditional school; K-6th grades
(Julia) Baldwin Elementary School	485	14	27.1	Kristine Loeper	July 1, 1980	Traditional school; P-6th grades
Bernal Intermediate School	742	32	24.1	Tammy Unck	July 1, 1980	Traditional school; 7th-8th grades
Christopher Elementary School	375	15	27.1	Marie Mabanag	July 1, 1980	Traditional school; K-8th grades
(Caroline) Davis Intermediate School	596	29	21.1	Ginelyn Doldolea-Kudsi	July 1, 1980	Traditional school; 7th-8th grades
Del Roble Elementary School	556	16	26.1	Dr. Miguel Rodriguez	July 1, 1980	Traditional school; K-6th grades
Edenvale Elementary School	467	18	26.1	Ryan Haven	November 1, 1966	Traditional school; K-6th grades
(Earl) Frost Elementary School	638	26	26.1	Yolanda Ross	July 1, 1980	Traditional school; K-8th grades
Hayes Elementary School	592	18	22.1	Tracy Cochran	July 1, 1980	Traditional school; K-6th grades
(Leonard) Herman Intermediate School	871	39	23.1	Christy Flores	July 1, 1980	Traditional school; 5th-8th grades
(Rita) Ledesma Elementary School	494	16	28.1	Jason Sorich	August 30, 1999	Traditional school; K-6th grades
Oak Ridge Elementary School	551	20	24.1	Michelle Tsang	July 1, 1980	Traditional school; K-6th grades
Parkview Elementary School	579	21	27.1	Susan Kind	July 1, 1980	Traditional school; K-6th grades
Sakamoto Elementary School	639	23	24.1	Fariba Roberts	August 1966	Traditional school; K-6th grades
Santa Teresa Elementary School	623	25	25.1	Mark Lepori	July 1, 1980	Traditional school; K-6th grades
(Samuel) Stipe Elementary School	423	13	26.1	Virgilio Caruz	July 1, 1980	Traditional school; K-6th grades
(Bertha) Taylor Elementary School	683	23	27.1	Ashley Morefield	July 1, 1980	Traditional school; K-6th grades

Note: So far, based on 2021-2022 school year data from the OGSD official website and further information from the California Department of Education.

== Former schools ==
Former school facts
School	Students	FTE teachers	Student/teacher ratio	Opening date	Closing date	Notes/type of school
Blossom Valley Elementary School	477	23	21.1	July 1, 1980	June 30, 2003	Traditional school; K-6th grades
Calero Elementary School				July 1, 1980	June 30, 1989	Traditional school; K-6th grades
(Maude) Dickinson Elementary School				July 1, 1980	June 30, 1989	Traditional school; K-6th grades
Glider Elementary School	620	22	28.1	July 1, 1980	June 30, 2018	Traditional school; K-6th grades
(George) Miner Elementary School	437	16	27.1	July 1, 1980	June 30, 2018	Traditional school; K-6th grades
San Anselmo Elementary School	354	16	22.1	July 1, 1980	June 30, 2003	Traditional school; K-6th grades

Note: So far, based on the data of the latest school year from the Public School Review and further information from the California Department of Education.
