= Cottle station =

VTA light rail station in San Jose, California

Cottle
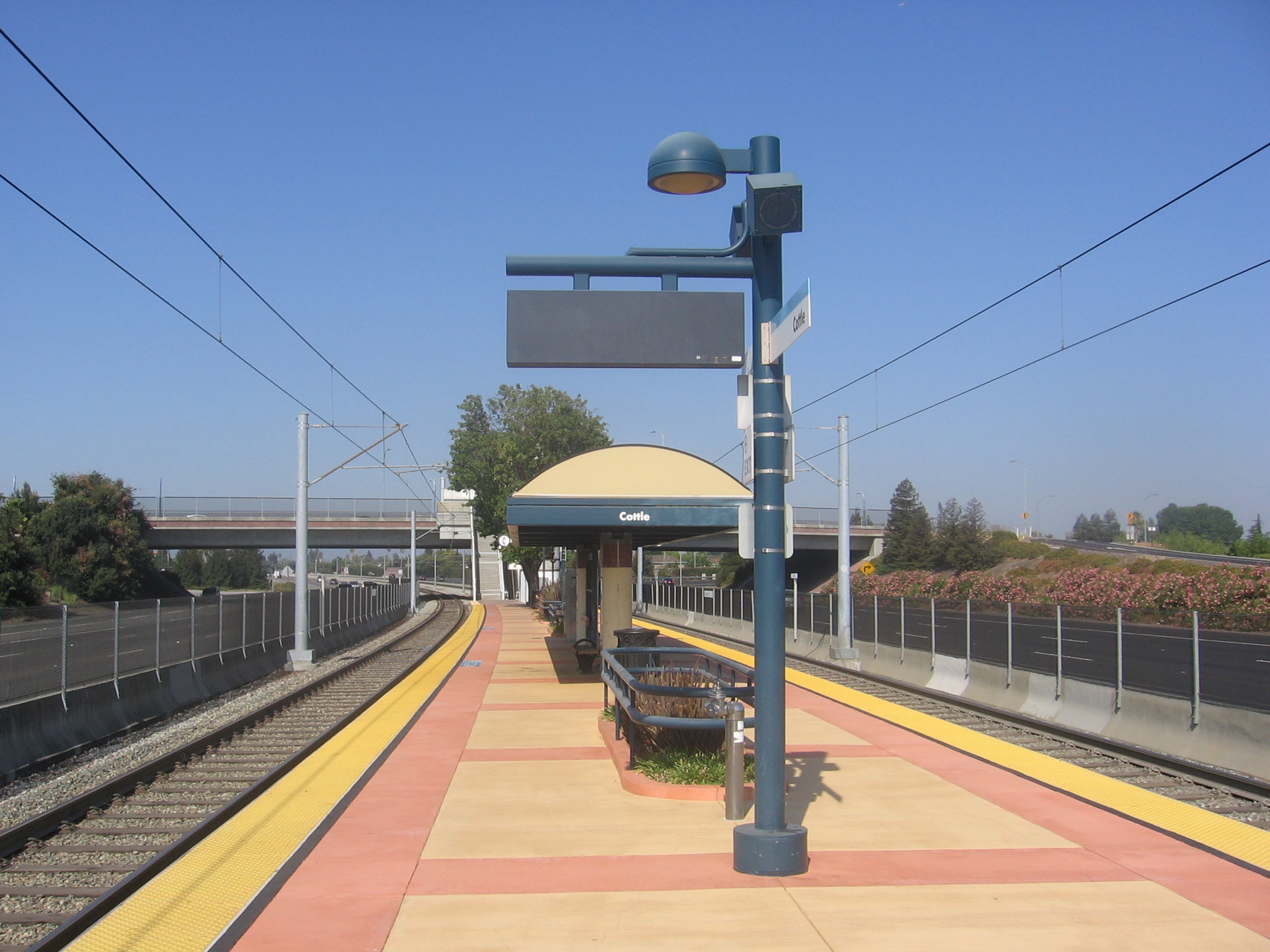
- Cottle station platform in 2012

General information
- Location: Cottle Road at Highway 85; San Jose, California
- Coordinates: 37°14′34″N 121°48′10″W
- Owner: Santa Clara Valley Transportation Authority
- Line: Guadalupe Phase 4
- Platforms: 1 island platform
- Tracks: 2
- Connections: VTA Bus: 27, 68

Construction
- Parking: 421 spaces
- Cycle facilities: Yes
- Accessible: Yes

History
- Opened: April 25, 1991
- Rebuilt: 2008

Services
Preceding station	VTA	Following station
Snell toward Baypointe	Blue Line	Santa Teresa Terminus
Location

Cottle station is a light rail station operated by Santa Clara Valley Transportation Authority (VTA). It is located in the median of State Route 85, near Cottle Road in the southern part of San Jose, California. The station is served by the Blue Line of the VTA light rail system. It was part of the original Guadalupe Line, the first segment of light rail from Santa Teresa to Tasman. It is the nearest light rail station to the Kaiser San Jose Medical Center and the Hitachi Global Storage Technologies campus.

== Transit connections ==
- The station is also served by shuttles to the local Kaiser hospital and to the Hitachi campus.
- The station is about one mile (1.6 km) from Caltrain's Blossom Hill station; since Caltrain only serves this station in peak direction during rush hours, the slower light rail service can be used at other times.
