= Children's Discovery Museum station =

VTA light rail station in San Jose, California

Children's Discovery Museum
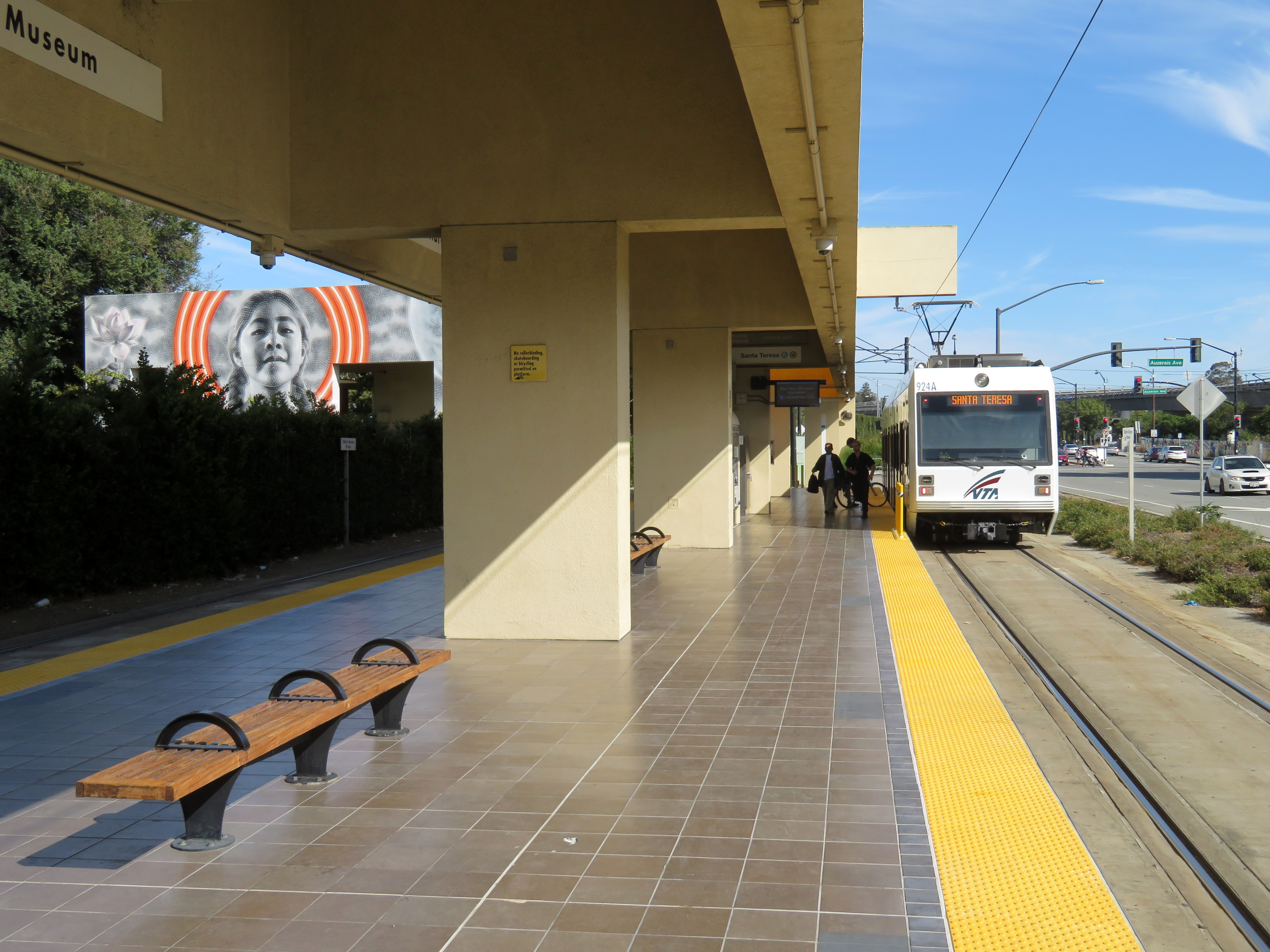
- Children's Discovery Museum station platform, 2018

General information
- Location: 180 Woz Way; San Jose, California
- Coordinates: 37°19′39″N 121°53′36″W
- Owner: Santa Clara Valley Transportation Authority
- Line: Guadalupe Phase 3
- Platforms: 1 island platform
- Tracks: 2
- Connections: VTA Bus: 23

Construction
- Structure type: At-grade
- Accessible: Yes

History
- Opened: August 17, 1990

Services
| Preceding station | VTA | Following station |
|---|---|---|
| Convention Center toward Baypointe | Blue Line | Virginia toward Santa Teresa |
Location

Children's Discovery Museum station is an at-grade light rail station on the Blue Line of the VTA light rail system. The station platform runs along Woz Way (named after Apple founder Steve "Woz" Wozniak) and serves the Children's Discovery Museum of San Jose, after which the station is named. Just south of this station, the Blue Line enters the median of California State Route 87.

== History ==
The station opened on August 17, 1990, as part of Phase 3 of the light rail system's original Guadalupe Line. It was originally named Technology Center station, after the Technology Center of Silicon Valley, a temporary museum that had just been renamed to The Garage. After the museum became The Tech Museum of Innovation and moved to a new building on the Plaza de César Chávez, the San Jose City Council proposed to rename it to "Children's Discovery Museum/Guadalupe River Park & Garden station" and "Discovery Meadows station" before arriving at a name that the VTA would approve, Children's Discovery Museum.

== Notable places nearby ==
The station is within walking distance of the following notable places:

- Children's Discovery Museum of San Jose
- Guadalupe River Trail
