= Snell station =

VTA light rail station in San Jose, California

Snell
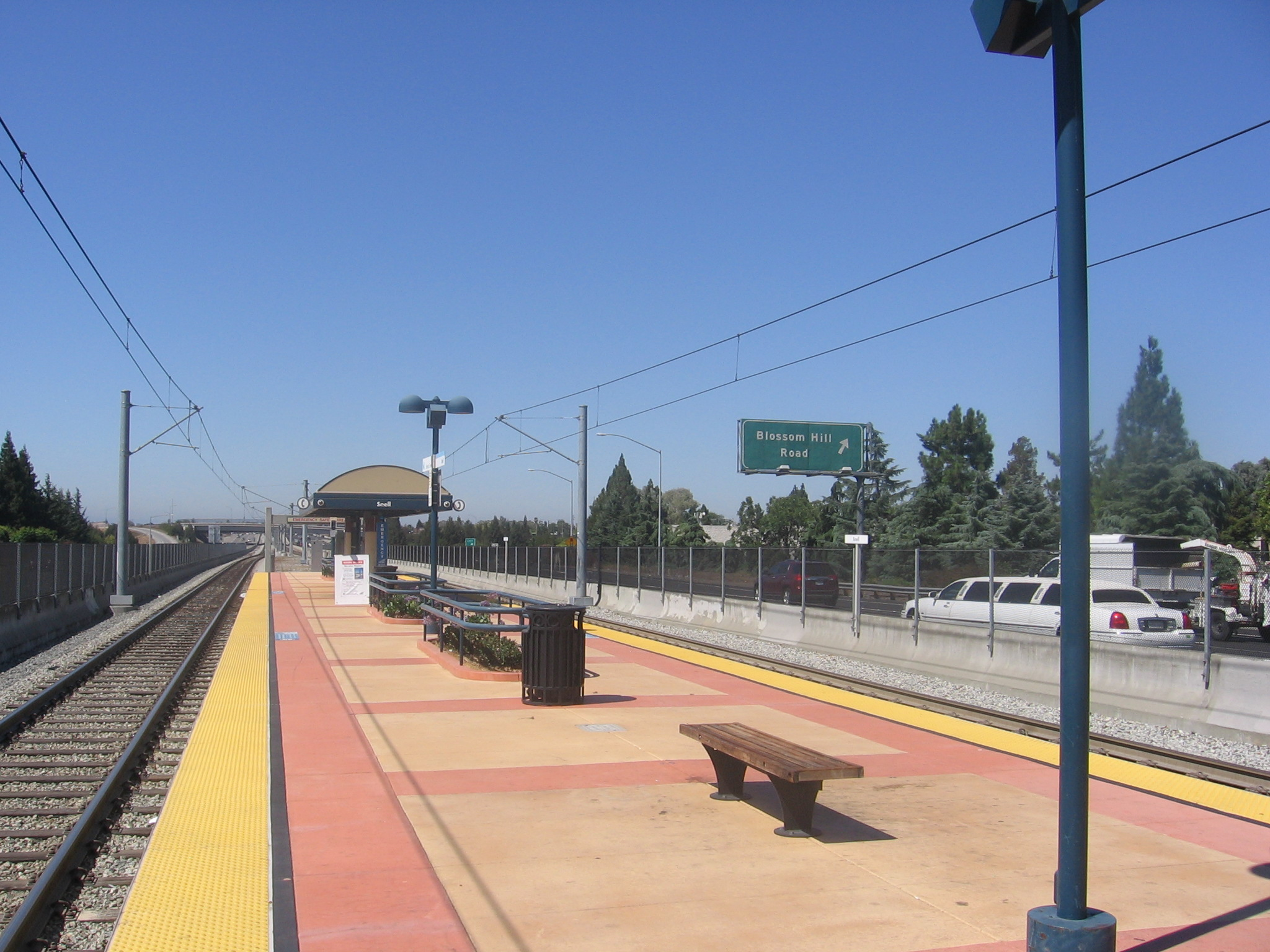
- Snell station platform in 2012

General information
- Location: Snell Avenue at Highway 85; San Jose, California
- Coordinates: 37°14′52″N 121°49′51″W
- Owner: Santa Clara Valley Transportation Authority
- Line: Guadalupe Phase 4
- Platforms: 1 island platform
- Tracks: 2
- Connections: VTA Bus: 66, Express 102

Construction
- Parking: 430 spaces
- Cycle facilities: 10 racks, 12 lockers
- Accessible: Yes

History
- Opened: April 25, 1991

Services
Preceding station	VTA	Following station
Blossom Hill toward Baypointe	Blue Line	Cottle toward Santa Teresa
Location

Snell station is a light rail station operated by Santa Clara Valley Transportation Authority (VTA). The station is served by the Blue Line of the VTA light rail system. It was part of the original Guadalupe Line, the first segment of light rail from Santa Teresa to Tasman. Snell station is located in the median of State Route 85, near Snell Avenue in the southern part of San Jose, California.
