= 2021 San Jose shooting =

Mass shooting in California, U.S.

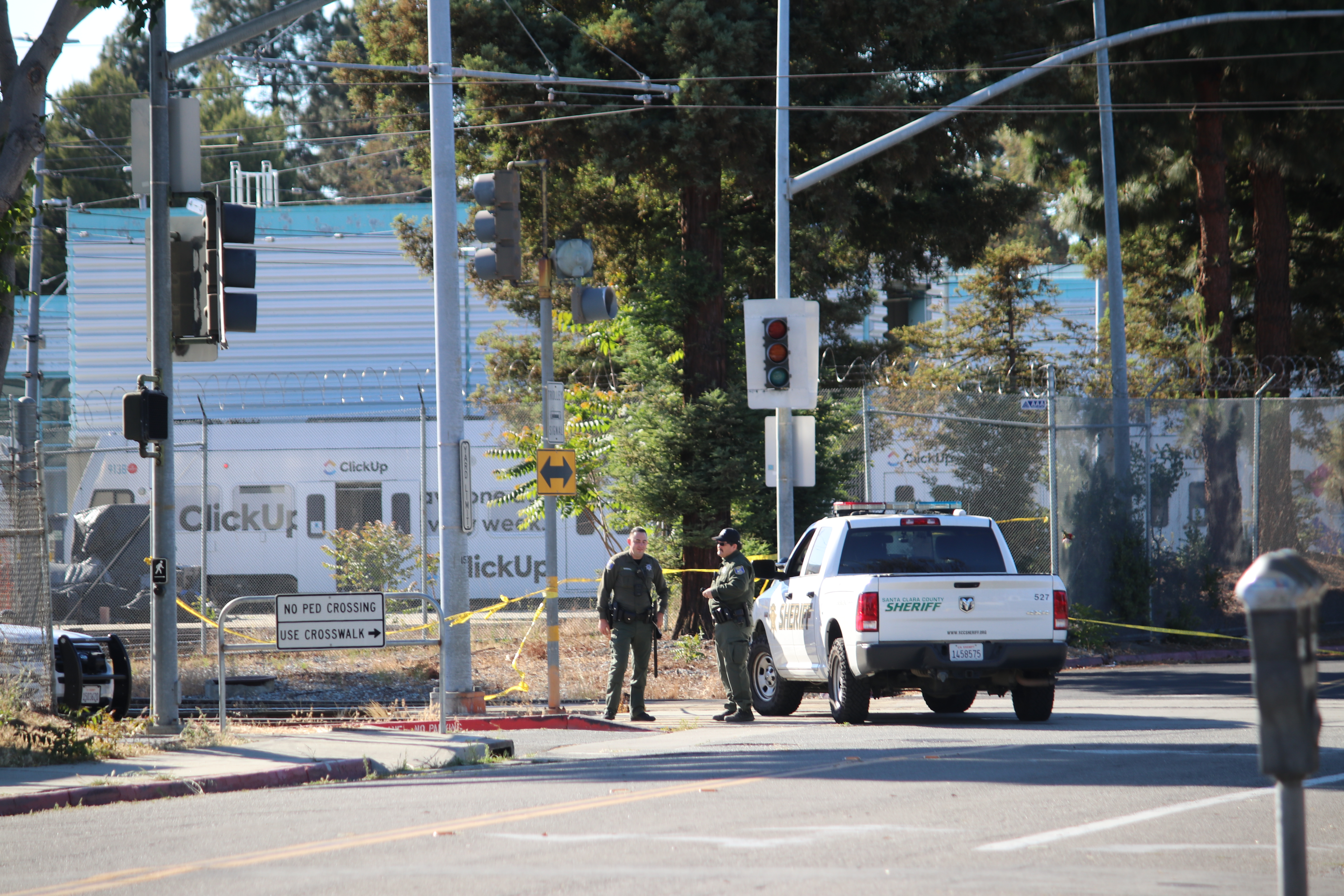
- Sheriff's deputies block access to the VTA Guadalupe Division yard a day after the shooting took place.
- Location: 37°21′15″N 121°54′30″W; 101 West Younger Avenue, San Jose, California, U.S.
- Date: May 26, 2021 c. 6:30 – 6:43 a.m. (PDT)
- Target: Staff at a Santa Clara Valley Transportation Authority facility
- Attack type: Mass shooting; mass murder; murder–suicide; workplace shooting; arson
- Weapon: Three 9mm semi-automatic pistols
- Deaths: 10 (including the perpetrator)
- Injuries: 0
- Perpetrator: Samuel James Cassidy
- Motive: Unknown

On May 26, 2021, a mass shooting occurred at a Santa Clara Valley Transportation Authority (VTA) rail yard in San Jose, California, United States. A 57-year-old VTA employee, Samuel James Cassidy, shot and killed nine VTA employees before killing himself. It is the deadliest mass shooting in the history of the San Francisco Bay Area.

As a result of the shooting, service throughout the VTA light rail system was suspended or limited for months. The city announced and later passed a package of policy proposals intended to curb gun violence, including mandatory liability insurance (the first law of its kind in the nation) and fees for gun owners.

== Background ==
The VTA is a public transportation agency that operates bus and light rail services throughout Santa Clara County and employs about 2,000 workers. The shooting took place at the VTA's Guadalupe Division facility, which is located in the Civic Center neighborhood of San Jose, near the Santa Clara County Sheriff's Office and San Jose Police Department headquarters. The facility consists of five separate buildings, including the control center for bus and rail operations, surrounding the agency's light rail vehicle storage and maintenance yard. A total of 379 VTA employees were employed at the yard.

California's gun laws are among the strictest in the country. Among other gun laws, the state has a red flag law that enables parties to file a Gun Violence Restraining Order (GVRO) which permits law enforcement authorities to subsequently seize a person's firearms if they are deemed to be a threat to themselves or others. In 2019, 122 such restraining orders were requested in Santa Clara County.

== Events ==
=== Shooting and house arson ===
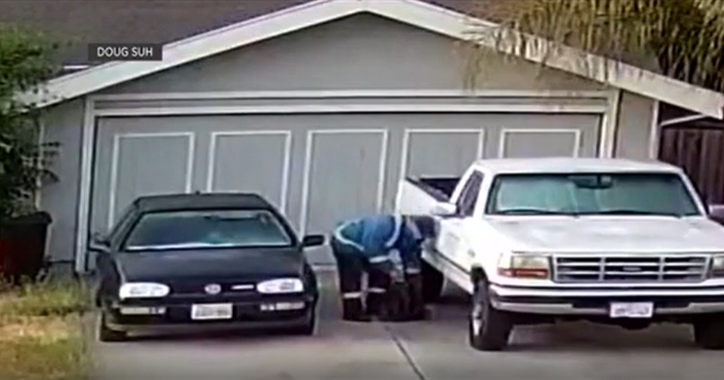
A CCTV still of Cassidy loading a duffel bag into his truck, a white 1992 Ford F-150, at his house before heading to the rail yard

On the day of the shooting, the gunman left his house at 5:39 a.m. PDT (UTC−07), having set it on fire. No one was inside the residence at the time. According to police, he coordinated the fire with the shooting and ignited it by placing ammunition inside a pot on his stove, surrounding the pot with accelerants, and then turning on the stove.

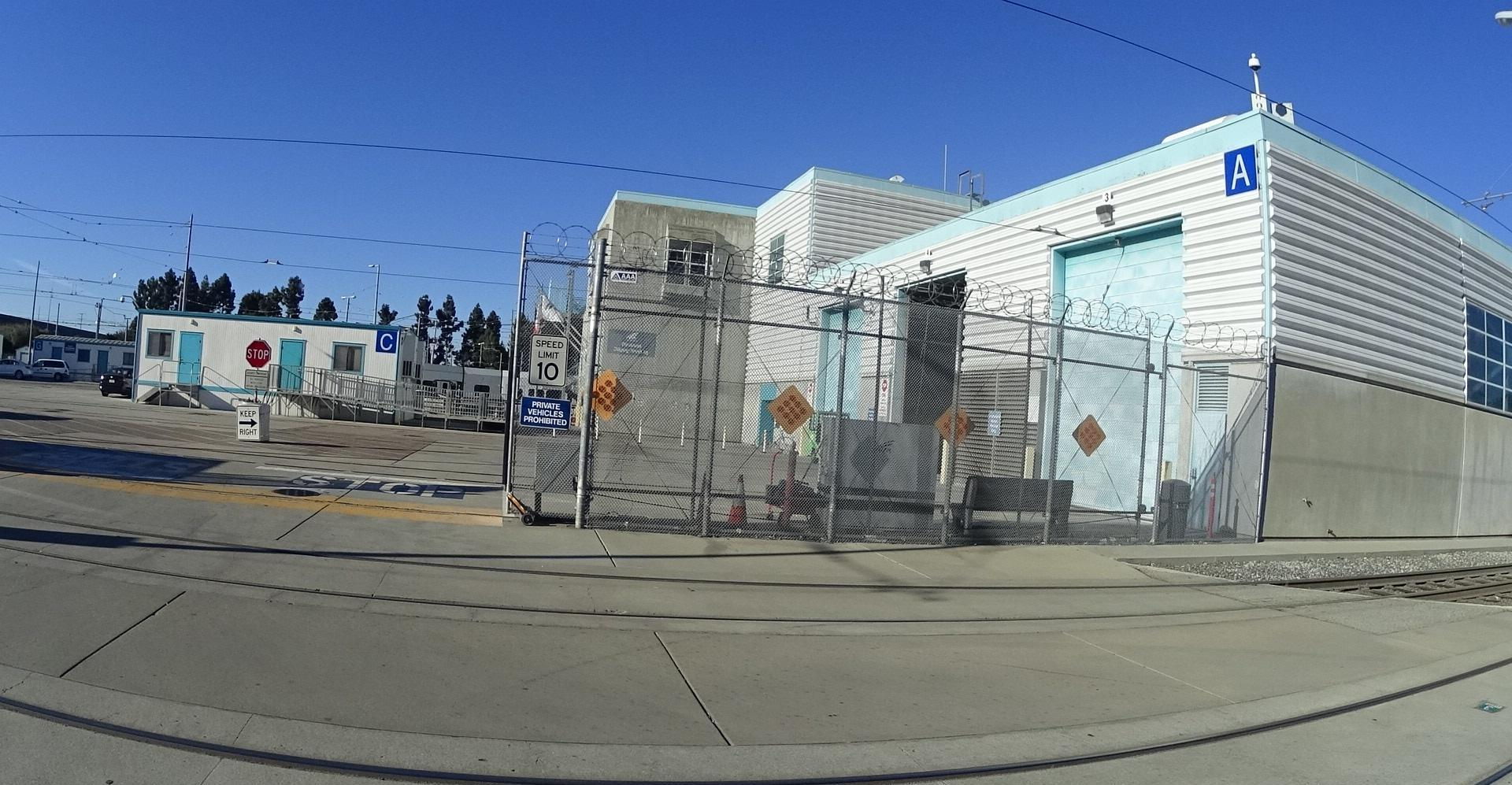
Building A at the VTA Guadalupe Division yard, where some of the victims were shot

At 6:33 a.m., the San Jose Fire Department received a call to respond to the VTA facility. According to dispatch audio, this caller did not mention anything about an active shooter incident. A minute later, Santa Clara County authorities received 9-1-1 calls about shots being fired at the VTA facility. Sheriff's deputies and city police officers responded from their nearby offices. When they arrived at 6:35 a.m., they found multiple people shot.

The shooting occurred in two separate buildings at the maintenance yard during the busiest time of day: a shift change in which employees from the overnight and morning shifts overlapped. Over 100 people were at the facility at the time of the shooting, according to the sheriff. The shooting began in a conference room in Building B, on the western side of the yard, during a power crew meeting with the local Amalgamated Transit Union president, who was spared. The gunman then walked over to Building A on the eastern side, where he continued firing. Police and witnesses later said the gunman targeted some of his victims and spared others from being shot.

At 6:36 a.m., the fire at the gunman's house was reported to emergency services by a passerby. Two minutes later, the fire department responded to the home in South San Jose, about eight miles (13 kilometers) away from the VTA facility, and discovered hundreds of rounds of ammunition and a gas can there. The house sustained heavy damage from the fire, with the second floor collapsing from the heat of the blaze.

At the same time the house fire was reported, the fire department received another call confirming there was an active shooter at the facility. At 6:38 a.m., responding officers heard more shots being fired. About ten minutes after the first 9-1-1 calls were received, dispatchers reported the final sounds of gunshots. At 6:43 a.m., officers closed in on the gunman as he killed himself on the third floor of Building A, between administrative offices and the operations control room. According to the Sheriff, the gunman fired two fatal shots: first under his chin, then in the side of his head.

=== Immediate aftermath ===
At 7:12 a.m., the sheriff's office instructed the public to stay away from the vicinity of the facility. At 8:08 a.m., the gunman was confirmed to be down. He had fired a total of 39 rounds from three semiautomatic handguns, and had been carrying 32 high-capacity magazines, some with 12 rounds and others with 15.

About 40 people were rescued from the area by law enforcement. Police received reports of explosive devices inside the building, prompting a bomb squad to investigate. A locker belonging to the gunman was found to contain suspected materials for bombs and detonator cords, which were later deemed not to be dangerous. Agents from the FBI and the Bureau of Alcohol, Tobacco, Firearms and Explosives also responded. The FBI led the shooting site investigation, which concluded on May 31.

Sheriff's deputies conducted a 3-day search of the gunman's house, finding a total of 12 firearms, 25,000 rounds of ammunition, and a dozen Molotov cocktails. As a precaution, bomb technicians also detonated a suspicious device at the house, using a specialized containing device that prevents the spread of shrapnel, but it turned out to be inert.

== Victims ==
There were ten fatalities in the shooting, including Cassidy. All were male VTA employees. Their ages ranged from 29 to 63, and many of them were longtime VTA employees. The victims names were Paul Delacruz Megia, 42; Taptejdeep Singh, 36; Adrian Balleza, 29; Jose Dejesus Hernandez, 35; Timothy Michael Romo, 49; Michael Joseph Rudometkin, 40; Abdolvahab Alaghmandan, 63; Lars Kepler Lane, 63; and Alex Ward Fritch, 49. Eight people, including the gunman, died at the scene. Two of the victims were rushed to Santa Clara Valley Medical Center in critical condition, but one was declared dead upon arrival and the other died later that day. Six of the victims were struck in Building B, and the other three were in Building A. Prior to their deaths, some of the victims had led coworkers to safety.

Autopsy reports confirmed that the manner of death for all nine victims was homicide, and that the cause of death for all nine victims was multiple gunshot wounds.

It is the deadliest mass shooting in the history of the Bay Area, exceeding the death toll of the 101 California Street shooting that occurred at a law firm in San Francisco in 1993, in which nine people including the gunman were killed.

In August 2021, a railyard employee who witnessed the shooting died by suicide on his first day back to work following the shooting. His death, if counted as a fatality, raises the death toll to 11.

== Perpetrator ==
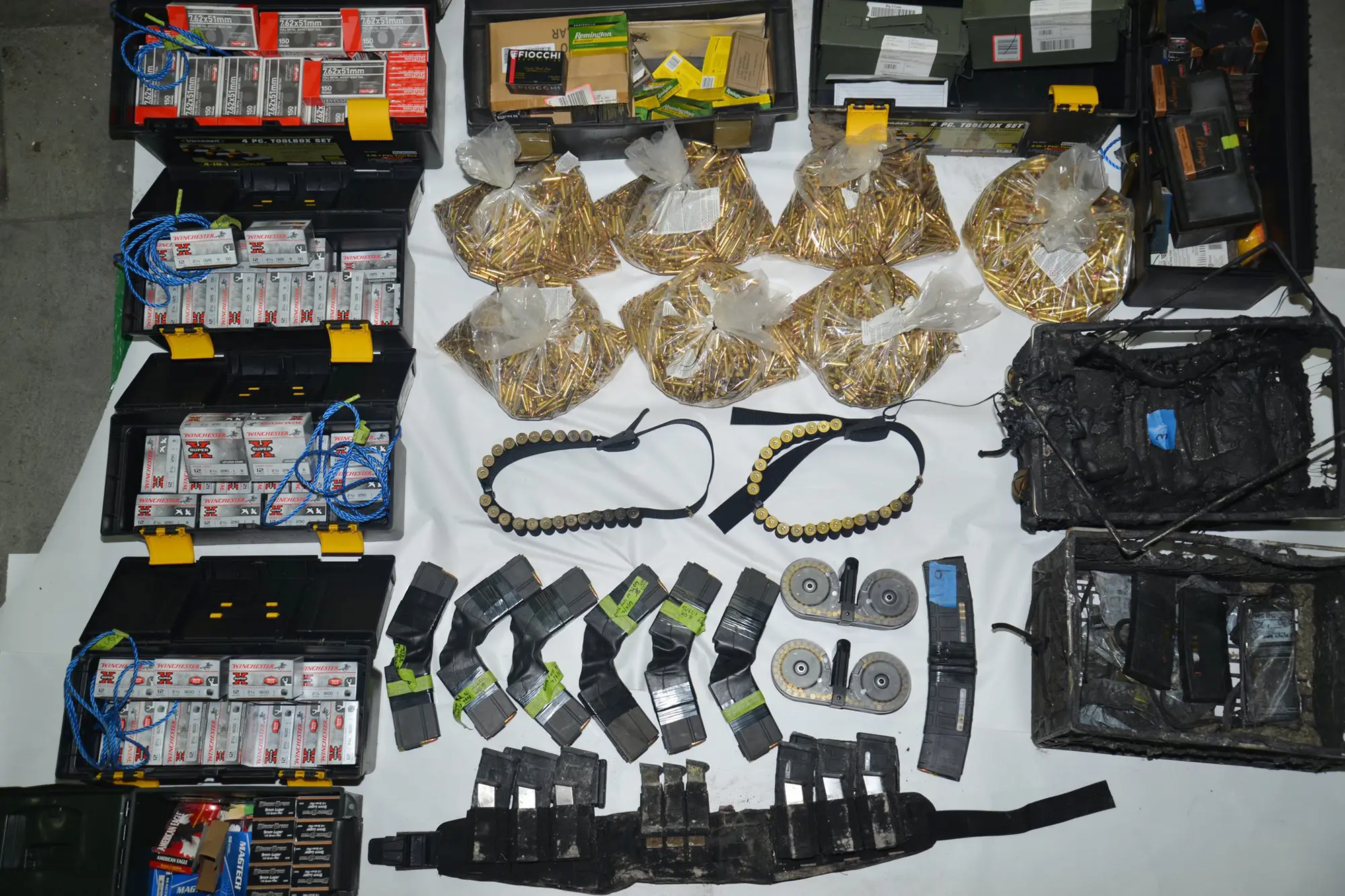
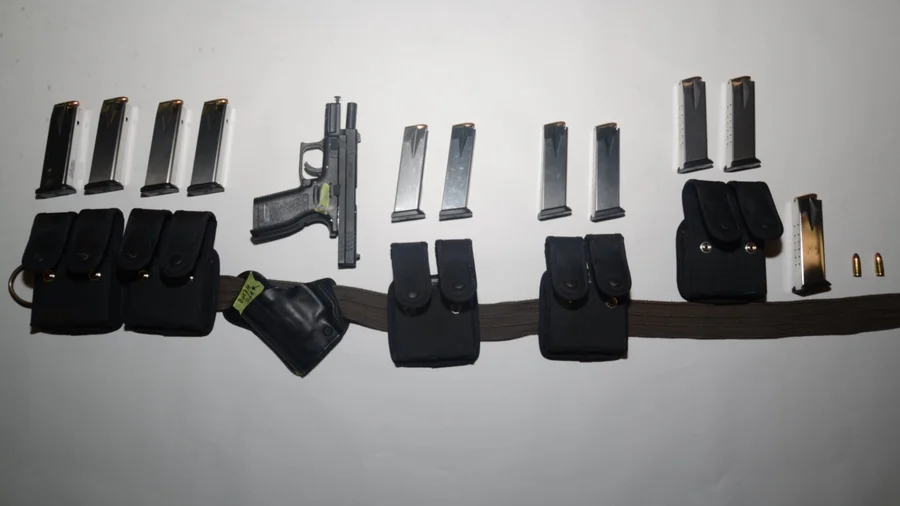
A cache of weapons and ammo owned by Cassidy

Police identified the gunman as 57-year-old VTA employee Samuel James Cassidy (August 29, 1963 – May 26, 2021) of Cupertino, California. He had been employed at the VTA since 2001; for his first two years, he was an electro-mechanic, and he was promoted to a substation maintainer position in 2014.

Cassidy owned numerous registered firearms, including shotguns and long rifles. He used three semiautomatic handguns in the shooting, which were legally obtained. It was unclear if he legally owned the high-capacity magazines used in the shooting; they are prohibited in California unless they were obtained before January 1, 2000, and the buyer was not otherwise prohibited from possessing firearms. Cassidy had a "minor criminal history" which consisted of a 1983 misdemeanor charge of obstruction for resisting a peace officer.

=== Possible motives ===
Cassidy's ex-wife, who he was married to from 1995-2005, described him as having anger issues and often being angry at his co-workers and at the VTA for what he believed to be unfair work assignments. She stated that he had talked about killing people at his workplace more than a decade ago.

According to an initial review by the VTA, Cassidy had a pattern of insubordination and had gotten into verbal altercations with coworkers on at least four separate occasions. Though the incidents were elevated to management and he faced disciplinary action, he had never been formally disciplined for any of them, and managers even defended his work. According to coworkers, Cassidy was angered over a change in policy that ended cash payouts for unused vacation days and, in April 2021, aired his grievances over the radio communication system for light rail operators. Cassidy's sister said that she suspected something happened at work on May 25 that motivated her brother to commit the shooting the following day.

=== 2016 detainment ===
An August 2016 memo by the United States Department of Homeland Security (DHS) described how, after taking a trip to the Philippines, Cassidy was detained by officers with U.S. Customs and Border Protection (CBP) for a secondary inspection. They subsequently found books about terrorism in his possession, along with a memo book filled with notes about his hatred of the VTA. He was asked whether he had problems with anyone at his workplace, and he said he did not. According to a DHS official, Cassidy was detained by the officers partly because of red flags regarding sex tourism, but nothing relating to sex tourism was found, and the detention did not result in an arrest or any follow-up action.

A CBP report on the encounter, released in July 2021, revealed Cassidy had harbored "dark thoughts about harming" two specific people, whose names were redacted from the report. It is unclear if they were connected to VTA or among the shooting victims. The CBP agents prioritized sex tourism in their questioning of Cassidy; noting "sex friendly" hotels that were mentioned in his writings and his text messages with women in the Philippines.

San Jose officials later said the authorities had not been informed of the detainment by federal officials. John Sandweg, the former acting director of U.S. Immigration and Customs Enforcement, released a statement saying there is no procedure for customs officials to alert local law enforcement agencies about a U.S. citizen detained as a safety threat. Santa Clara County district attorney Jeffrey F. Rosen said that, had his office been alerted about Cassidy's detainment, they would have had enough evidence to obtain a gun violence restraining order and seize his weapons.

== Aftermath and reactions ==
=== Memorials and victim assistance efforts ===
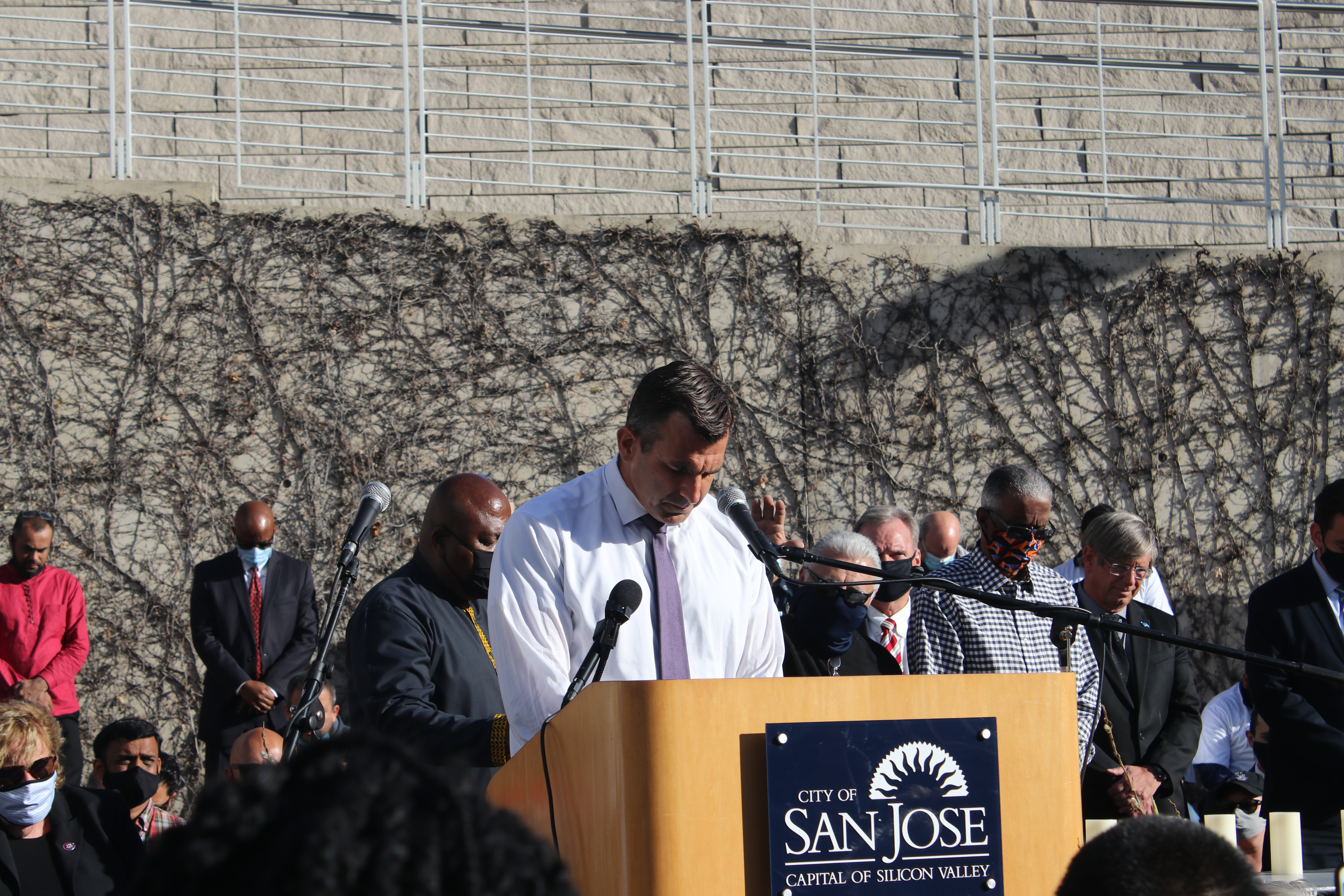
San Jose Mayor Sam Liccardo observes a moment of silence during a vigil for the victims of the shooting.

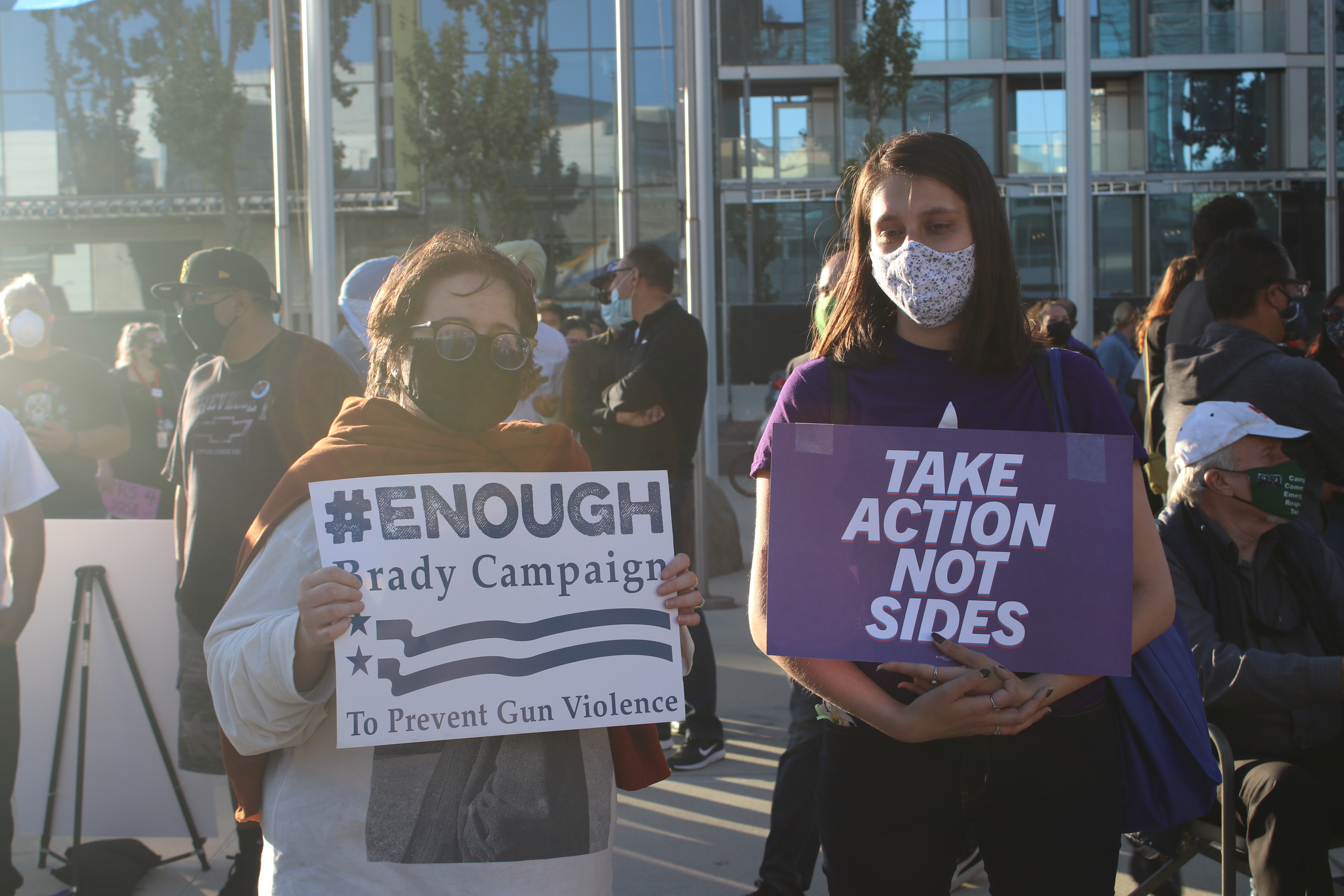
Protesters at the May 26 vigil

A hotline was set up for VTA employees and family members for additional information about the shooting and the victims. The VTA announced plans to help survivors and victims' families and partner with them on erecting a public memorial to the victims. A memorial in the form of an eternal torch with the victims' names engraved was ceremoniously revealed on the one year anniversary of the attack.

Some employees criticized the VTA's efforts to help them after the shooting; they claimed the Authority did not actually care for them and attributed the assistance efforts to the local Amalgamated Transit Union instead.

Mayor Sam Liccardo said it was a "horrific day" for the city and the VTA, and he expressed his condolences to the victims and their families. He also emphasized that VTA employees have been essential workers during the COVID-19 pandemic. Former President Joe Biden and Vice President Kamala Harris both urged Congress to take action on gun control legislation. Biden ordered flags to be lowered to half-staff and called the shooting a "horrific tragedy". Governor Gavin Newsom made similar remarks during a visit to San Jose.

The day after the shooting, a vigil was held outside San Jose City Hall and attended by hundreds, including the victims' families and many VTA employees, who were dressed in their work attire. On June 22, the San Jose City Council made plans to introduce a resolution commemorating the victims' lives.

On June 28, the California State Legislature included $20 million allocated to the VTA in the state budget, as part of an effort to help it recover from the shooting. The funds are intended to help the VTA "provide mental health resources to employees and their families, resume light rail service and improve safety upgrades at the Guadalupe Rail Yard", where the shooting took place.

=== VTA service interruptions and repairs ===
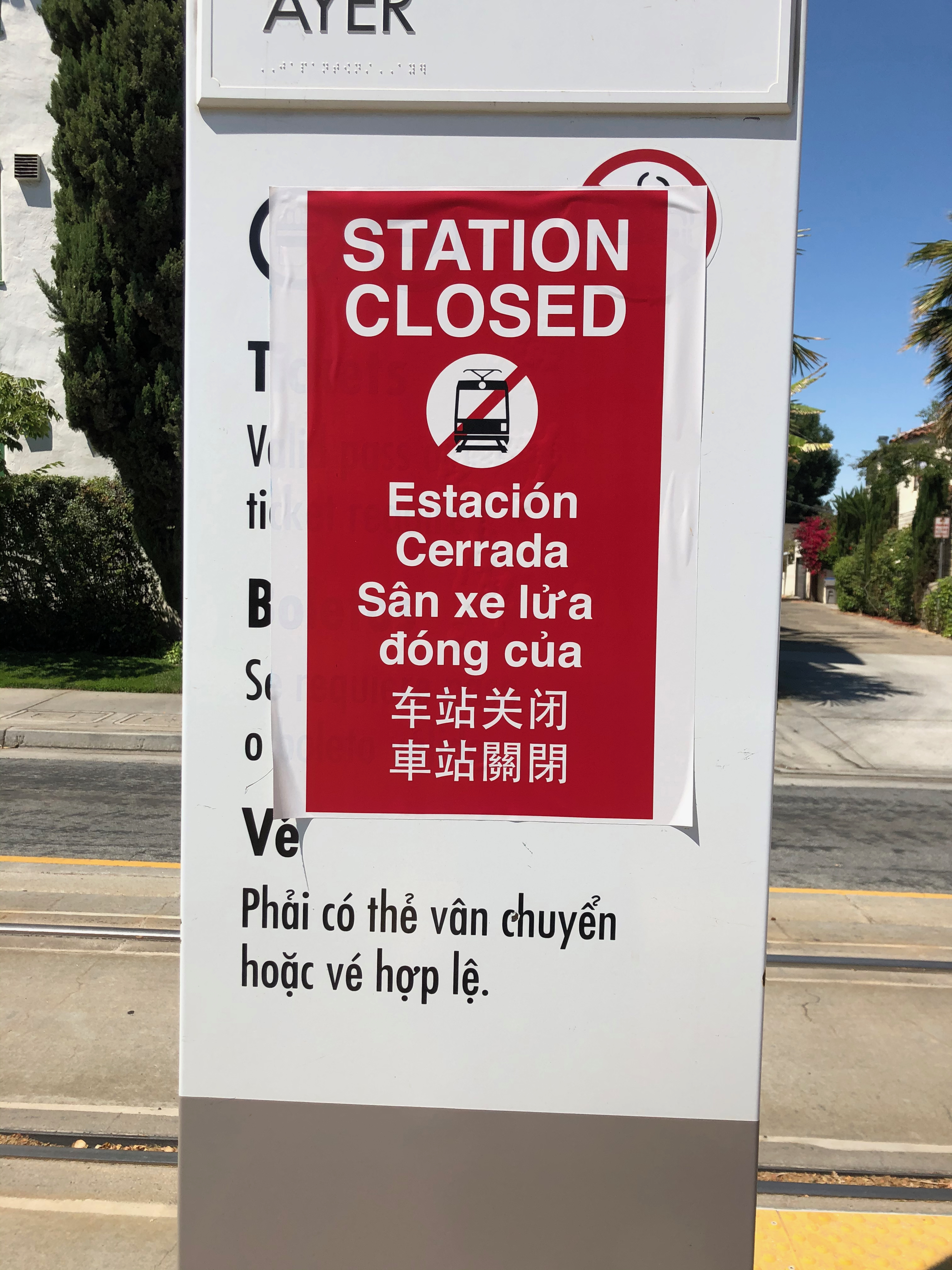
A sign indicating the indefinite suspension of service throughout the VTA light rail system.

VTA light rail service was suspended on the day of the shooting and replaced by a bus bridge. Due to a staffing shortage and the inaccessibility of the facility where the shooting occurred, the VTA discontinued the bus bridge on June 1 in favor of regular bus routes and confirmed that light rail service would be suspended indefinitely. As a form of mutual aid, the San Francisco Municipal Railway, Golden Gate Transit, SamTrans, AC Transit, and the Santa Cruz Metropolitan Transit District sent from 20 to 30 buses daily to Santa Clara County to supplement bus service while VTA workers attended funeral services for the victims.

The VTA resumed limited passenger service in stages throughout August and September. On August 2, a free bus bridge began serving portions of the Blue and Orange lines between Paseo de San Antonio and Milpitas stations. On August 29, light rail service returned to the Orange Line and part of the Green Line. On September 2, service along the Green and Blue lines was extended southward through downtown San Jose. The remainder of the Blue Line was restored on September 12, followed by the Green Line south of downtown on September 18.

The shooting caused significant damage to light rail operation and control equipment. Since the shooting, bus operations were relocated to a temporary facility as the VTA took steps to restore light rail service, including retraining and recertifying drivers and giving operators tours of the Guadalupe yard. The agency has not yet decided whether to remodel, or demolish and rebuild the buildings damaged during the shooting. It was expected to operate out of temporary facilities for three to five years.

=== Investigations and legal proceedings ===
As of December 2021, the Santa Clara County Sheriff's Office and an outside law firm retained by the VTA are both conducting investigations into the shooting. A case is open in probate court regarding Cassidy's estate, including the home he set on fire. In May 2022, the families of the nine shooting victims all filed wrongful death lawsuits against the VTA, Santa Clara County, and private security contractors. By November 2022, eight of the families reached a settlement that awarded each a share of $8 million in addition to previously provided workers compensation and pension benefits. The family of one victim, Lars Kepler Lane, refused the settlement and pursued litigation (which was still ongoing as of July 2025).

=== Changes to San Jose's gun laws ===
On June 8, Liccardo and four city councilmembers announced ten harm reduction policy proposals intended to curb gun violence in the city, including two policies that would be the first of any city or state in the country: gun owners would be required to carry liability insurance and pay an annual fee to compensate the city for the emergency response and other public costs associated with unintentional gun-related death, injuries, or property damage. A gun buyback program was also proposed. Some of these proposals had originally been put forward in 2019 after the Gilroy Garlic Festival shooting, the previous mass shooting to occur in Santa Clara County, but they were put on hold due to the COVID-19 pandemic. The liability insurance and annual fee policies were criticized by the executive director of Gun Owners of California, who said California's preemption laws gave the city no authority to enact differing gun laws.

On June 15, the San Jose City Council unanimously approved an ordinance requiring, among other things, retailers to record video and audio footage of gun sales, with the intention of preventing straw purchases of firearms. On June 29, the City Council unanimously approved sending the ten ordinances to the City Attorney for review and to bring them back to council in September 2021 On January 25, 2022, the City Council passed the Gun Harm Reduction Ordinance, which would impose the first gun fee and gun liability insurance requirement in the country, prompting the National Association for Gun Rights (NAGR) to file a lawsuit against the city minutes later. On September 30, 2022, District Judge Beth Labson Freeman issued a partial dismissal on NAGR's lawsuit against San Jose's gun control ordinance, which had been consolidated with a suit by the Howard Jarvis Taxpayers Association, with leave to amend in part and without leave to amend in part. On July 13, 2023, she dismissed the consolidated lawsuit again with leave to amend in part and without leave to amend in part.

As of September 2021, a date for the gun buyback program had not been announced.

=== Policy proposals ===
San Jose officials invited other California cities to join an amicus brief supporting the state's appeal of Miller v. Bonta, which by coincidence struck down the state's 1989 assault weapons ban several days after the shooting on June 4. Although Cassidy did not use an assault weapon, Attorney General Rob Bonta cited the San Jose shooting in a statement opposing the ruling. Representative Zoe Lofgren of San Jose emphasized the need to pass the Enhanced Background Checks Act and the Bipartisan Background Checks Act, which are unlikely to overcome a Senate filibuster.

Following reports that local law enforcement agencies were not informed by the Homeland Security Department of Cassidy's 2016 detainment, a department spokeswoman said the agency was working to improve information-sharing with other law enforcement agencies. Issues with information-sharing between agencies had been a problem in recent years and has sometimes involved high-profile incidents such as the storming of the U.S. Capitol and the Stoneman Douglas High School shooting. Liccardo met with Biden on July 12 to discuss strategies on combating gun violence in the U.S.

Following the shooting and rising anti-Asian sentiment in the United States, a petition was started, demanding officials to address concerns made by employees of the San Jose Public Library over their safety. The petition cited the library's lack of security infrastructure and procedures as reasons for the employees' concerns.

== See also ==
- List of mass shootings in the United States in 2021
- List of homicides in California
- List of shootings in California
