= Virginia station =

VTA light rail station in San Jose, California

Virginia
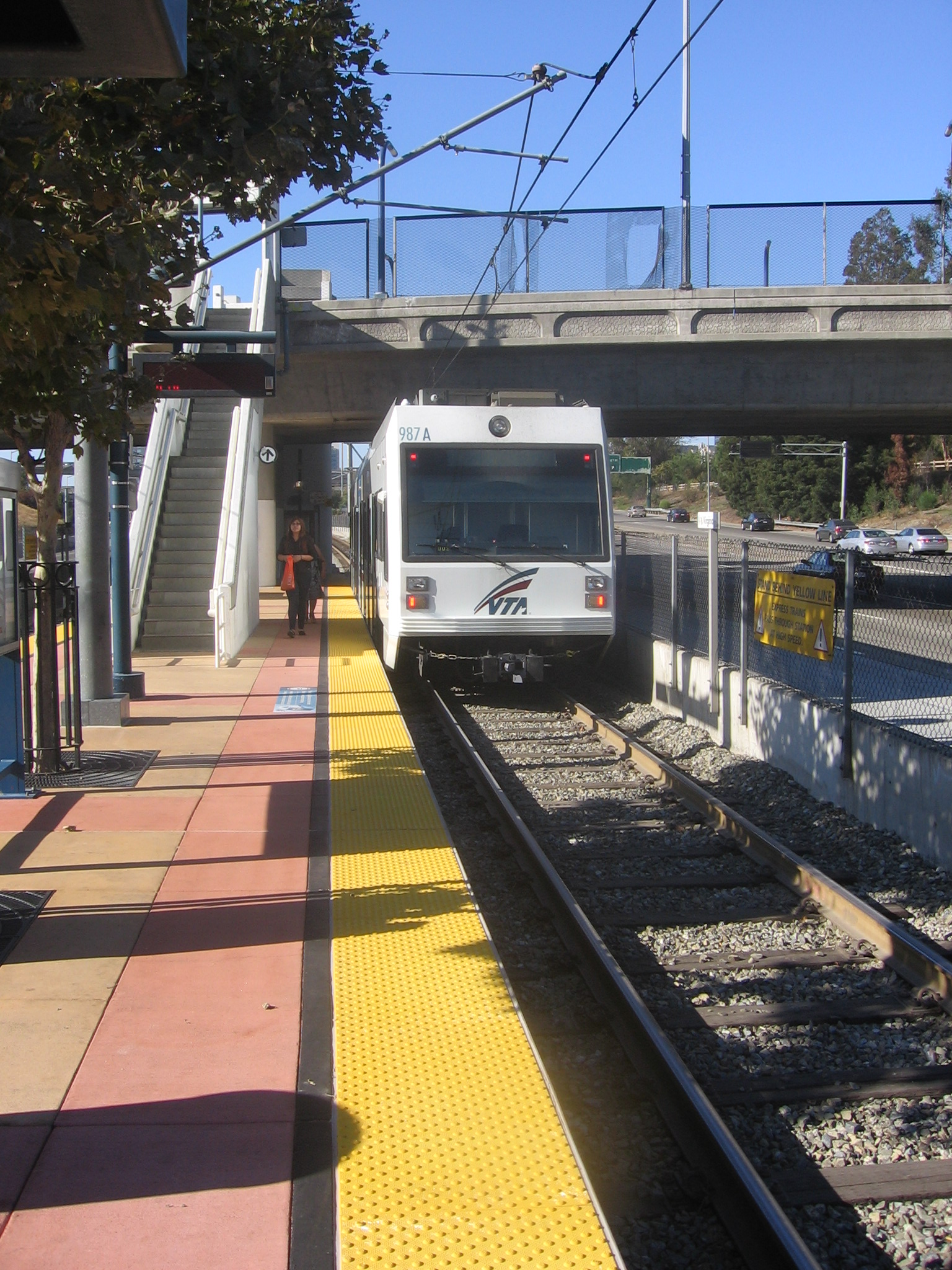
- Train at Virginia station in 2012

General information
- Location: 362 West Virginia Street; San Jose, California
- Coordinates: 37°19′11″N 121°53′24″W
- Owner: Santa Clara Valley Transportation Authority
- Line: Guadalupe Phase 3
- Platforms: 1 island platform
- Tracks: 2

Construction
- Accessible: Yes

History
- Opened: August 17, 1990

Services
Preceding station	VTA	Following station
Children's Discovery Museum toward Baypointe	Blue Line	Tamien toward Santa Teresa
Location

Virginia station is a light rail station operated by Santa Clara Valley Transportation Authority (VTA). Virginia station is served by the Blue Line of the VTA light rail system.

Virginia station is located in the median of State Route 87 just south of the Virginia Street overpass. It is accessed either via a set of stairs on the south side of Virginia Street, or an elevator on the north side of Virginia Street.
