= Convention Center station (VTA) =

VTA light rail station in San Jose, California

Convention Center
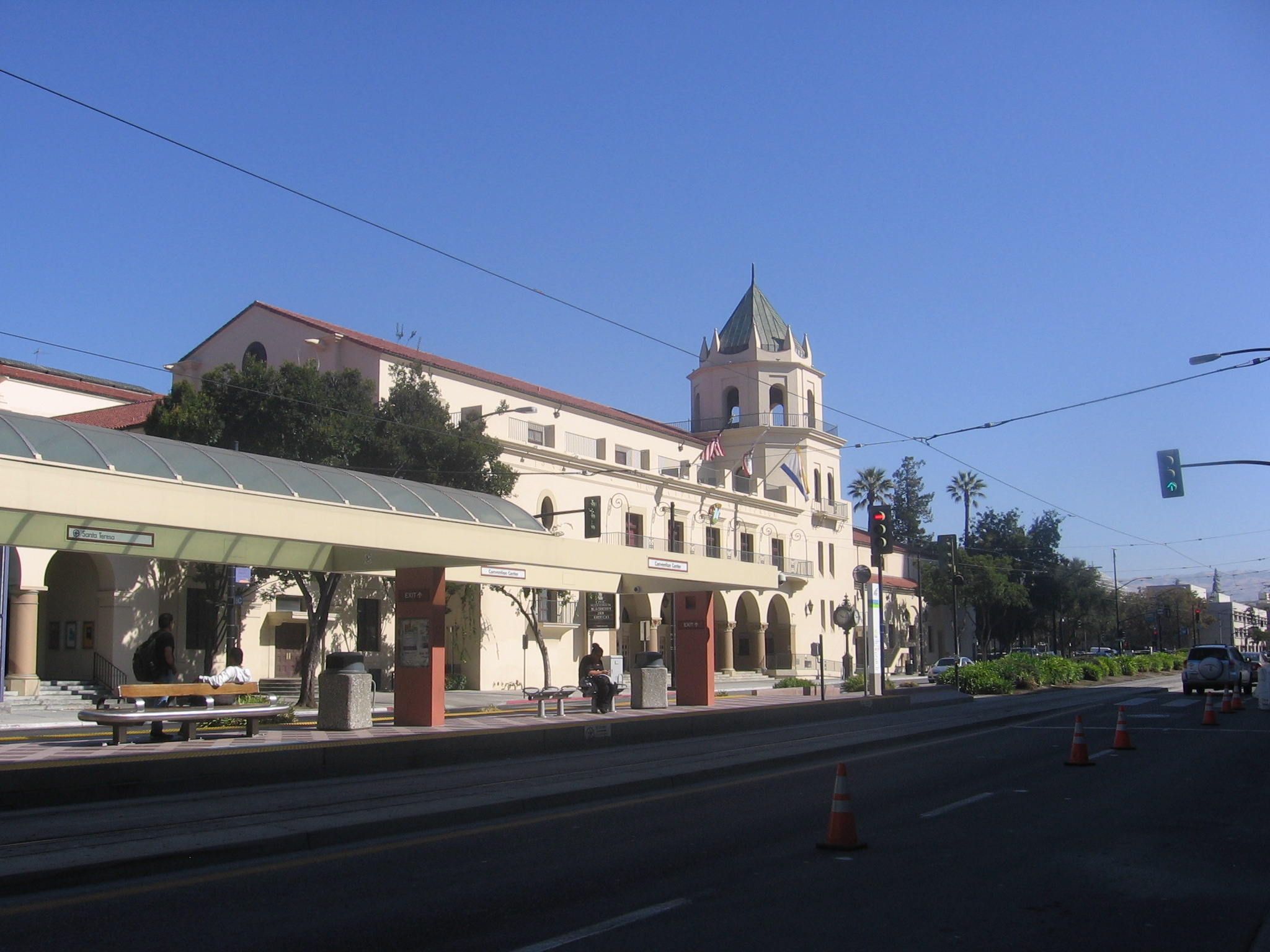
- Convention Center station with the Civic Auditorium in the background in September 2012

General information
- Location: San Carlos Street and Market Street; San Jose, California
- Coordinates: 37°19′48″N 121°53′25″W
- Owner: Santa Clara Valley Transportation Authority
- Line: Guadalupe Phase 2
- Platforms: 1 island platform
- Tracks: 2
- Connections: VTA Bus: 23, Rapid 523

Construction
- Structure type: At-grade
- Accessible: Yes

History
- Opened: June 17, 1988
- Rebuilt: 2006

Services
Preceding station	VTA	Following station
Paseo de San Antonio toward Baypointe	Blue Line	Children's Discovery Museum toward Santa Teresa
Paseo de San Antonio toward Old Ironsides	Green Line	San Fernando toward Winchester
Paseo de San Antonio toward Civic Center	Holly Trolley Christmastime only	San Fernando toward San Jose Diridon
Former services
Preceding station	VTA	Following station
Paseo de San Antonio toward Baypointe	Blue Line Commuter Express 2010-2018	Ohlone/Chynoweth toward Santa Teresa
Location

Convention Center station is an at-grade light rail station on the Blue Line and the Green Line of the VTA light rail system. The station platform is located in the median of West San Carlos Street, between Almaden Boulevard and Market Street. The station is located across from the San Jose Convention Center, after which the station is named.

Convention Center was renovated in 2006 to be made fully wheelchair accessible.

== Notable places nearby ==
The station is within walking distance of the following notable places:

- Opera San José at the California Theatre – 2 blocks away – 345 1st Street
- San Jose Convention Center – across the street – 150 West San Carlos Street
- San Jose Civic (auditorium) – across the street – 135 West San Carlos Street
- San Jose Center for the Performing Arts – 1 block away – 255 Almaden Boulevard
- The Tech Interactive – 3 blocks away – 201 South Market Street
