= Paseo de San Antonio station =

VTA light rail station in San Jose, California

Paseo de San Antonio
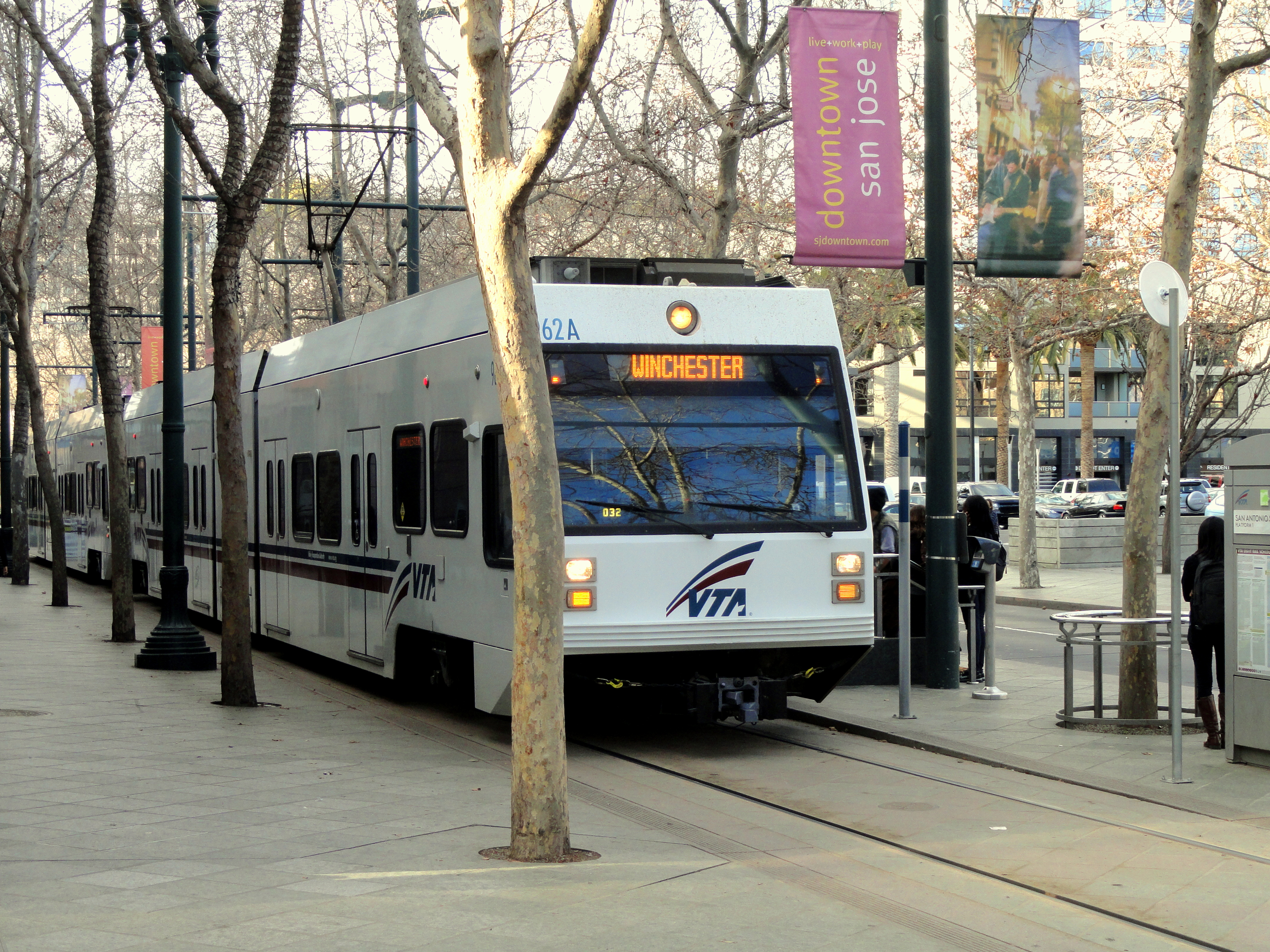
- Paseo de San Antonio station platform

General information
- Location: Paseo de San Antonio; San Jose, California
- Coordinates: 37°19′59″N 121°53′15″W
- Owner: Santa Clara Valley Transportation Authority
- Line: Guadalupe Phase 2
- Platforms: 2 side platforms
- Tracks: 2
- Connections: VTA Bus: 23, 66, 68, Rapid 523, Rapid 568

Construction
- Structure type: At-grade
- Accessible: Yes

History
- Opened: June 17, 1988
- Rebuilt: 2006

Services
Preceding station	VTA	Following station
Santa Clara toward Baypointe	Blue Line	Convention Center toward Santa Teresa
Santa Clara toward Old Ironsides	Green Line	Convention Center toward Winchester
Santa Clara toward Civic Center	Holly Trolley Christmastime only	Convention Center toward San Jose Diridon
Location

Paseo de San Antonio station is an at-grade light rail station on the Blue Line and the Green Line of the VTA light rail system. The station platforms run along the Downtown San Jose transit mall, with the northbound platform located alongside 1st Street and the southbound platform located alongside 2nd Street. The two platforms are connected by a pedestrian plaza, the Paseo de San Antonio, after which the station is named.

The station is located close to the campus of San Jose State University.

== History ==
Paseo de San Antonio station was built as part of the second phase of what was then called the Guadalupe Line. The first phase opened on December 11, 1987, while the second phase opened about six months later on June 17, 1988, largely due to the complexity of building the transit mall in Downtown San Jose.

Paseo de San Antonio was renovated in 2006 to permit level boarding at all doors.

== Service ==
=== Location ===
The station is located in Downtown San Jose, California on 1st and 2nd Streets just north of East San Carlos Street. The northbound platform is on 1st Street; the southbound platform is on 2nd Street.

=== Station layout ===
This station, like all three of the San Jose transit mall stations, operates over a pair of one-way couplet streets. The northbound platform is located alongside 1st Street and the southbound platform is located alongside 2nd Street. on each street, the left lane is a general-purpose lane, the right lane is a bus-only lane, and light rail trains operate on a wide sidewalk on the right side of the road. Buses and light rail trains share a large common platform between the bus lane and the light rail tracks. In 2019, safety railings were installed to separate trains and pedestrians on the wide sidewalks.

== Notable places nearby ==
The station is within walking distance of the following notable places:

- Alfred E. Alquist State Building – 1 block away – 100 Paseo de San Antonio
- Dr. Martin Luther King Jr. Library – 2-3 blocks away – 150 E San Fernando St
- Fairmont San Jose Hotel – 1-2 blocks away – 170 S Market St
- Hammer Theatre – 1-2 blocks away – 101 Paseo de San Antonio
- Robert F. Peckham United States Courthouse and Federal Building – less 1 block away – 280 N First St
- San Jose Chamber of Commerce – 1 block away – 310 S First St
- San Jose Museum of Art – 2-3 blocks away – 110 S Market St
- San Jose State University – 2-3 blocks away – 1 Washington Square
- Plaza de Cesar Chavez – 1-2 blocks away – Park Av & Market St
