= The Tech Interactive =

Museum in San Jose, California

Coordinates: 37.3314374°N 121.8907276°W

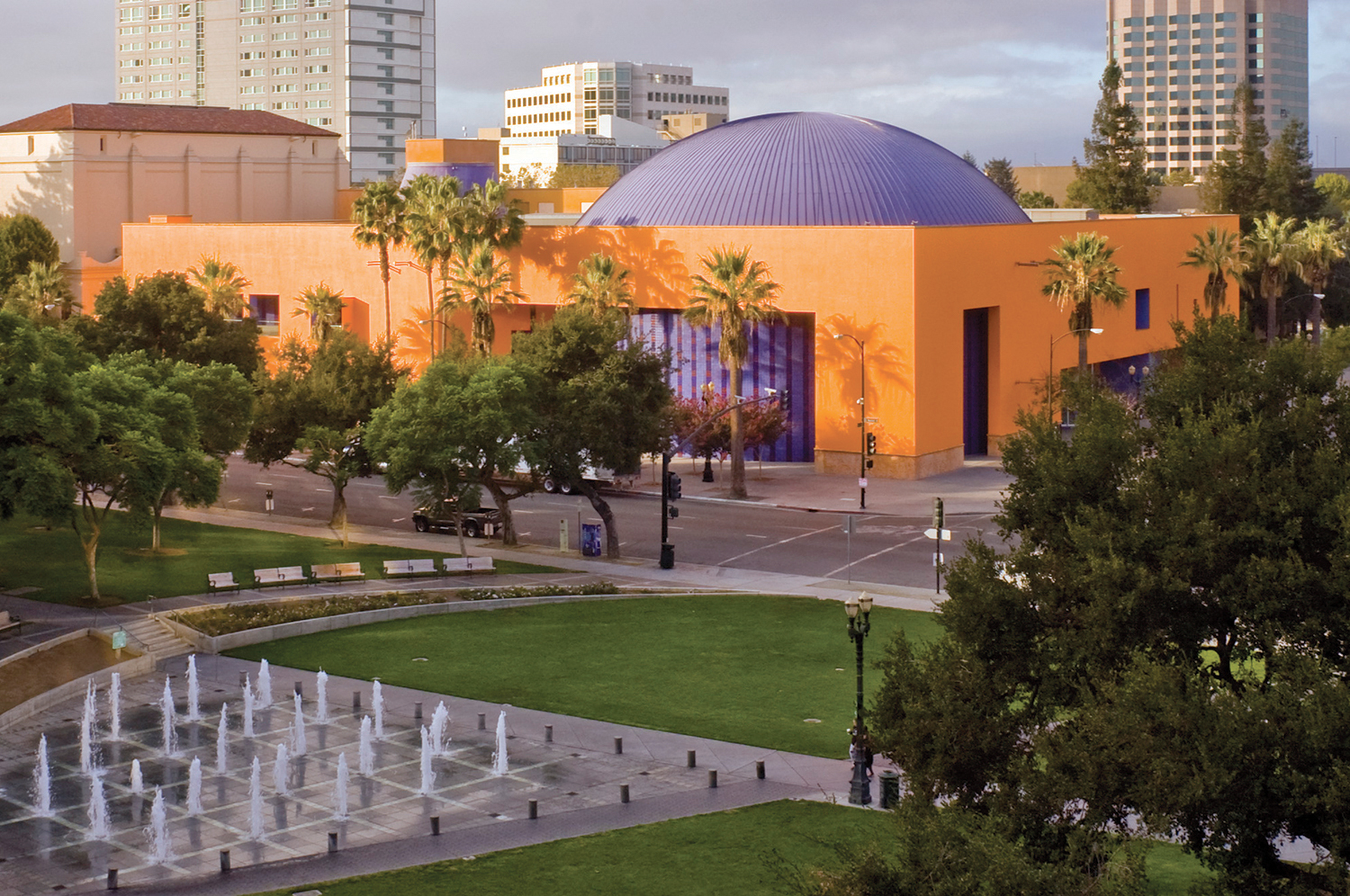
- The Tech Interactive, viewed from nearby Plaza de César Chávez in Downtown San Jose

- Location within San Jose, California Location within California Location within the United States
- Former name: The Tech Museum of Innovation
- Established: October 31, 1998; 27 years ago
- Location: 201 South Market Street; San Jose, California, US
- Type: Science
- Visitors: 400,000 annually
- President and CEO: Katrina Stevens
- Architect: Ricardo Legorreta
- Public transit access: Convention Center
- Website: www.thetech.org

Association of Science-Technology Centers
- astc.org

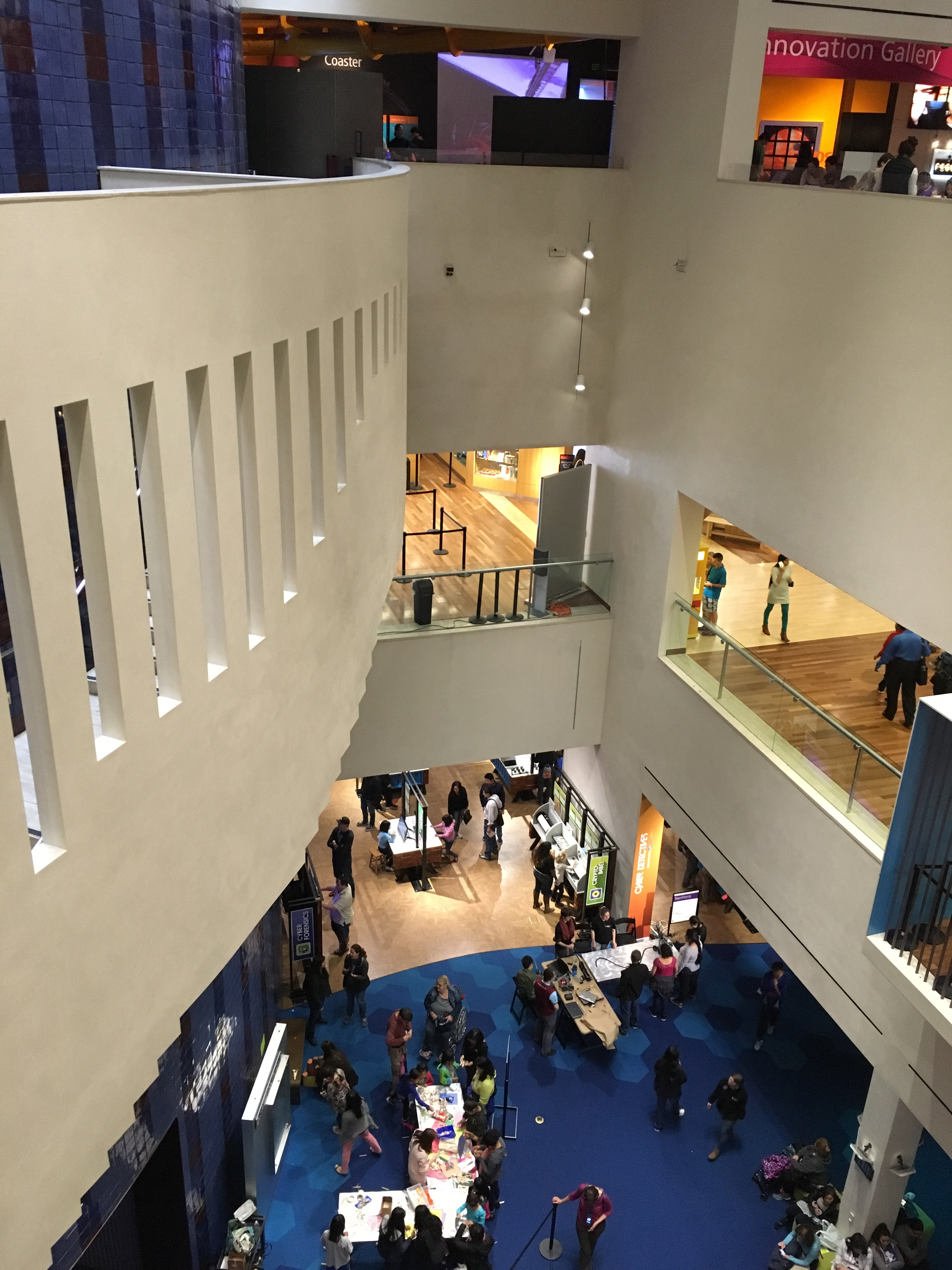
The atrium inside The Tech Interactive, showing all three levels

The Tech Interactive (formerly The Tech Museum of Innovation, commonly known as The Tech) is a science and technology center in San Jose, California that offers hands-on activities, labs, design challenges and other STEAM education resources.

== Description ==
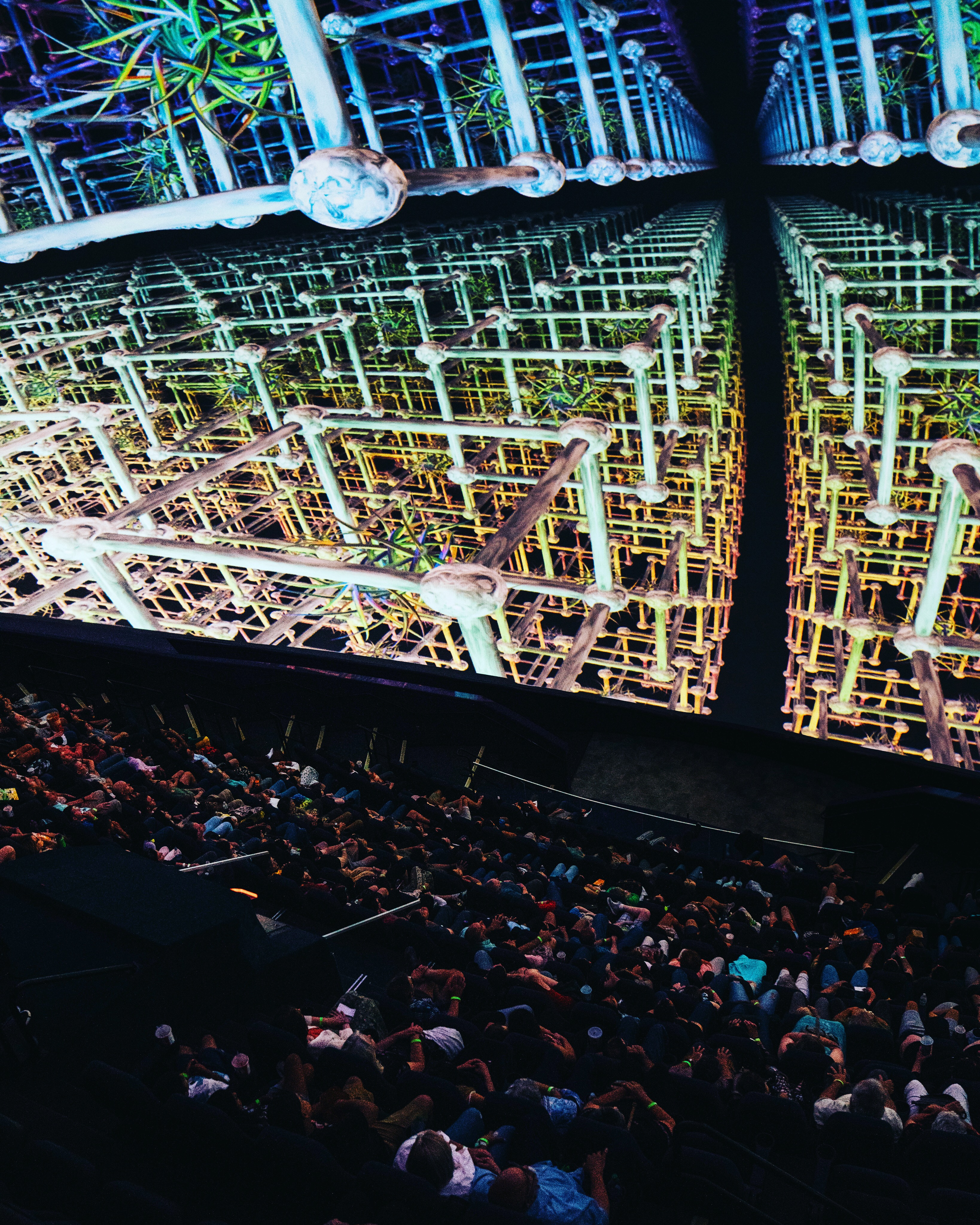
IMAX Dome Theater showing "Mesmerica" in fall 2019

The building has three floors. On the lower level there is a multi-story sculpture titled Origin, inside a 45-foot-tall (14 m) cylindrical tower. Near the entrance to the building, there is Science on a Roll, a rolling ball sculpture by George Rhoads. The front wall is inscribed with quotations from Silicon Valley entrepreneurs Bill Hewlett, David Packard, Bob Noyce, and Gordon Moore. The building was designed by Mexican architect Ricardo Legorreta.

The building hosts the IMAX Dome Theater, which opened in 1998 and shows mainstream movies as well as educational films.

The Tech is a registered 501(c)(3) organization.

== History ==
Planning began in 1978 by members of the Junior League of Palo Alto, with later assistance by the San Jose Junior League. The City of San Jose promised funding for a Technology Center of Silicon Valley in the 1980s, but progress was slow.

The first 20,000-square-foot (1,900 m^{2}) temporary exhibit opened in 1990, named "The Garage" in homage to the HP Garage. It was housed in San Jose's former convention center. On October 31, 1998, The Tech Museum of Innovation was inaugurated in a 132,000-square-foot (12,300 m^{2}) facility. In May 2019, the organization was renamed as The Tech Interactive.

In 2018, an expansion of Tech Interactive by 63,000 square feet (5,900 m^{2}) was proposed, as part of a major high-rise office development in Park Habitat.

During the COVID-19 pandemic, The Tech Interactive temporarily closed for in-person visits in March, 2020, and published online STEM resources in English and Spanish.

In November 2020, Katrina Stevens became president and CEO of The Tech Interactive, succeeding Tim Ritchie. She is the first woman and first educator to lead the organization.

In 2025, Dream Garden, an AI-powered immersive exhibit, opened as an exploration of artificial intelligence through movement and creativity. The exhibit is part of the AI Sandbox gallery, a space dedicated to exploring AI and developing greater understanding of the technology.

== Programs ==
=== The Tech for Global Good ===
The Tech for Global Good is a program evolved from The Tech Awards, a yearly ceremony in which individuals and organizations were recognized for their technological contributions to improving the human condition. In 2016, The Tech announced it was expanding The Tech Awards program from a once-a-year event to a year-round program with educational materials and exhibits. Since then, Tech for Global Good has focused every year on a different theme, such as health care or data. It honors organizations under that theme as its laureates for the year, focusing on their problem-solving abilities in lesson plans, videos and other materials for students.

=== The Tech Challenge ===
The Tech Challenge is an international engineering design challenge competition for students Grades 4–12, in which teams of students use the engineering design process to solve a real-world problem, such as designing a structure to withstand an earthquake or a device to deliver water..

== See also ==
- Children's Discovery Museum of San Jose
- Exploratorium
- List of science centers
