= Children's Discovery Museum of San Jose =

Cultural institution in California, United States

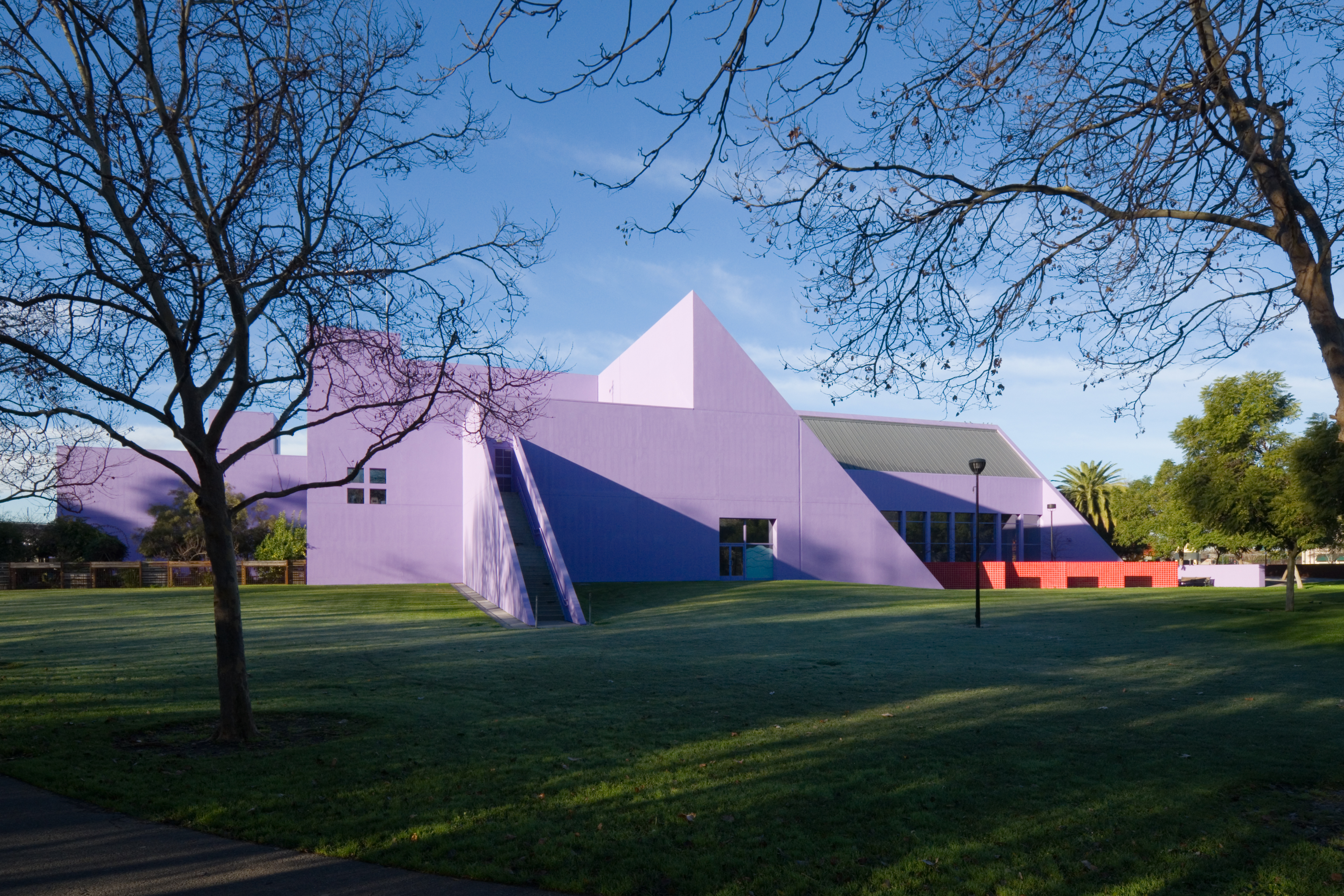
- Established: 1990
- Location: 180 Woz Way; San Jose, California 95110
- Coordinates: 37.32668°N 121.89177°W
- Accreditation: Association of Children's Museums
- Director: Marilee Jennings
- Architect: Ricardo Legorreta
- Public transit access: Children's Discovery Museum
- Website: www.cdm.org

Association of Science-Technology Centers
- astc.org

Children's Discovery Museum of San Jose (CDM) is a cultural institution serving children, families, and schools in the Silicon Valley/San Francisco Bay Area. A member of the Association of Children's Museums and the Association of Science and Technology Centers, Children's Discovery Museum is located in downtown San Jose, California, on Woz Way. The street is named after Steve Wozniak, co-founder of Apple Computer, whose nickname is "Woz". Wozniak was the single largest private donor during the original capital campaign that funded the museum.

== Overview ==
The museum opened its doors in 1990, and over 9 million visitors have visited. The 52,000-square-foot (4,800 m^{2}) purple building was designed by Mexico City-based architect Ricardo Legorreta, and houses 28,000-square-foot (2,600 m^{2}) of gallery space as well as a half-acre outdoor nature play space opened in 2017. The museum is one of two buildings in Downtown San Jose designed by Legorreta; the other is The Tech Interactive, which opened in 1998.

The museum builds and displays interactive exhibits that responds to early childhood education. The museum's exhibits, programs and initiatives have received local, regional and national attention. Among its exhibits are a two life size Columbian mammoth replicas, authentic explorable vehicles including a fire engine and a Wells Fargo stagecoach, and five visual and performing arts spaces.

The museum is known for its Cultural Celebrations series highlighting the culture and traditions of the diverse population groups represented in this majority minority region.

Children's Discovery Museum of San Jose has been ranked by Child magazine as one of the top 10 children's museums in the United States and ranked by the London Observer as one of the top 5 science centers in the world.

== Exhibits and programs ==
Exhibits at the Children's Discovery Museum of San Jose

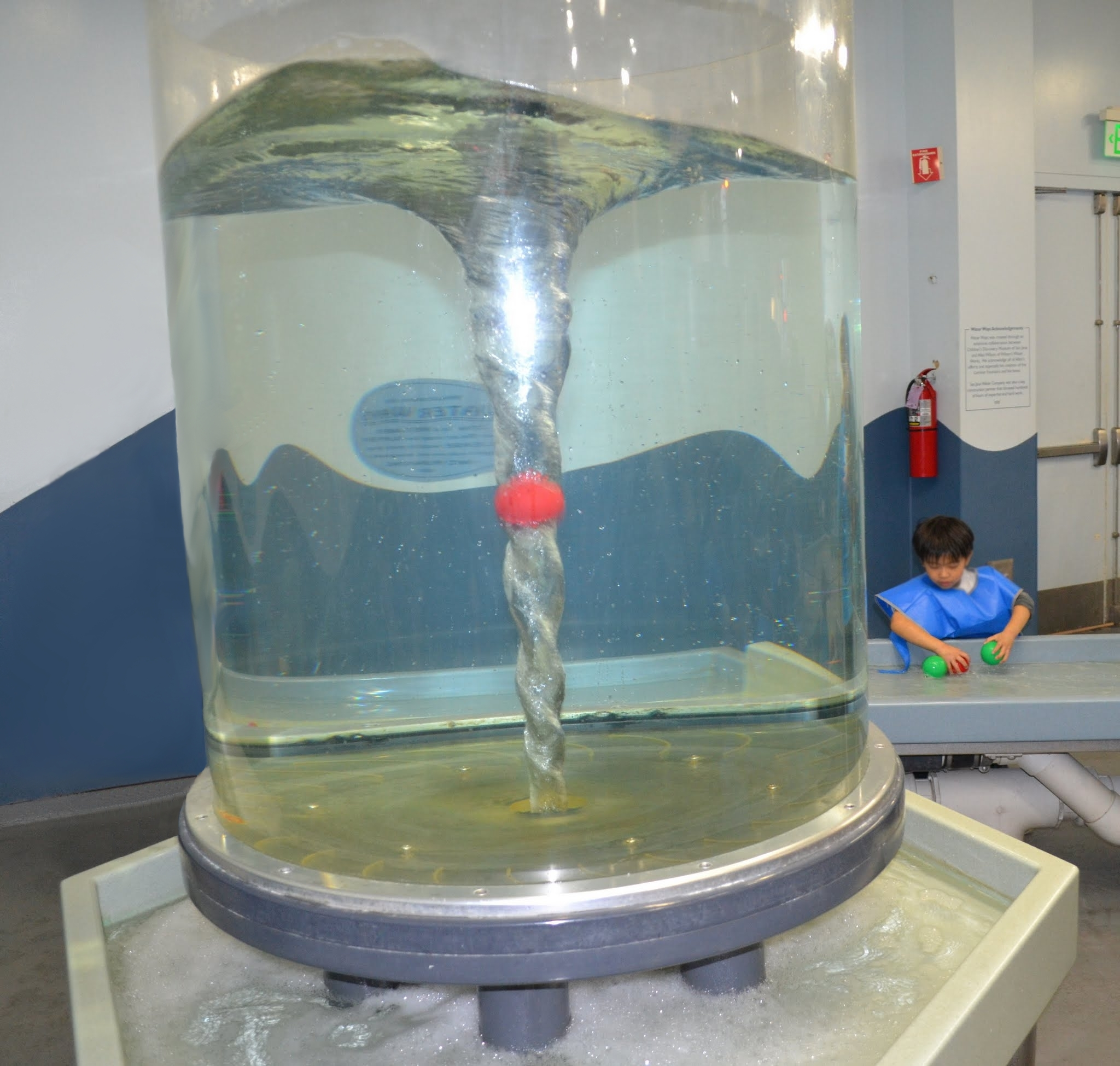
Water vortex

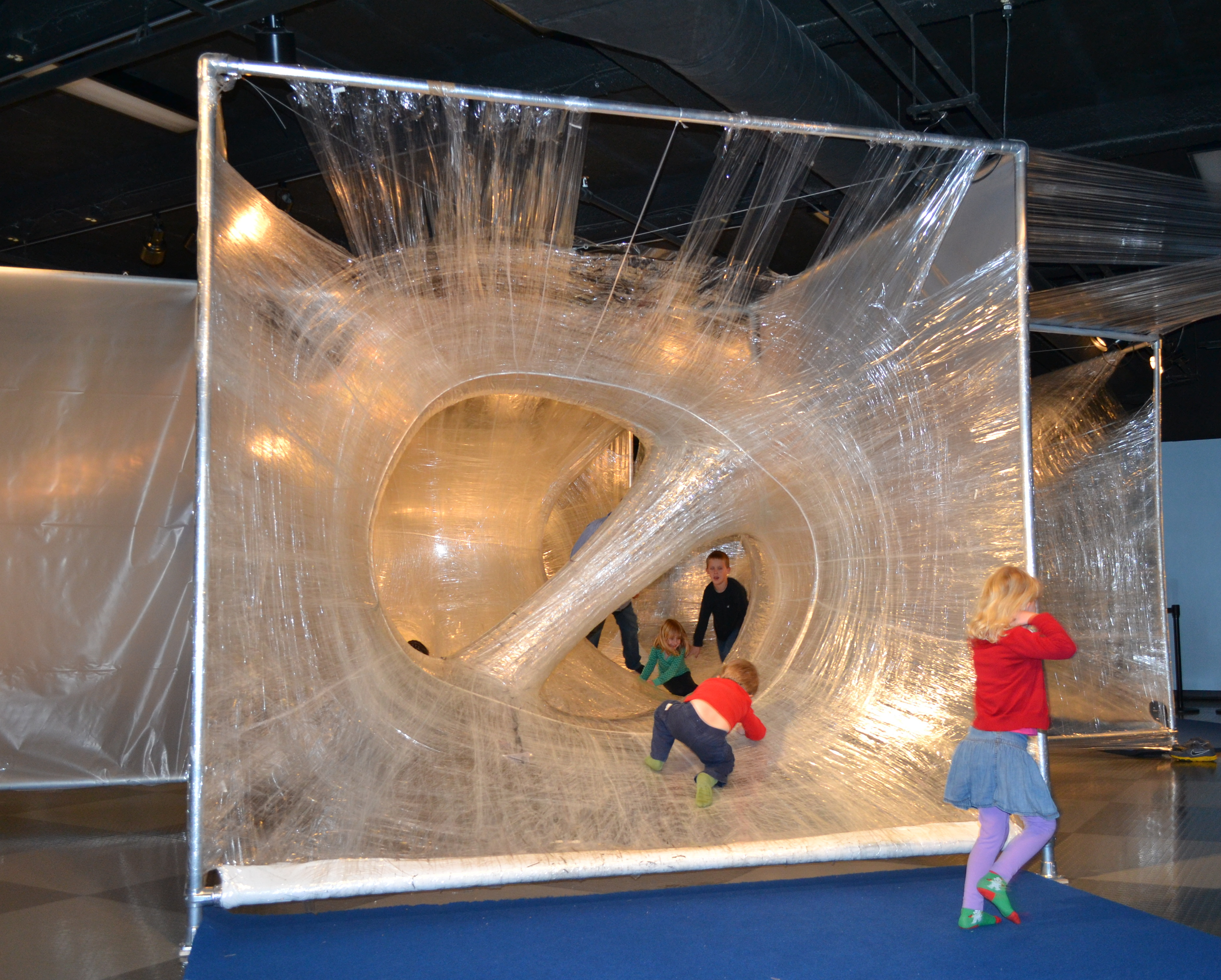
Eric Lennartson's Tape Scape

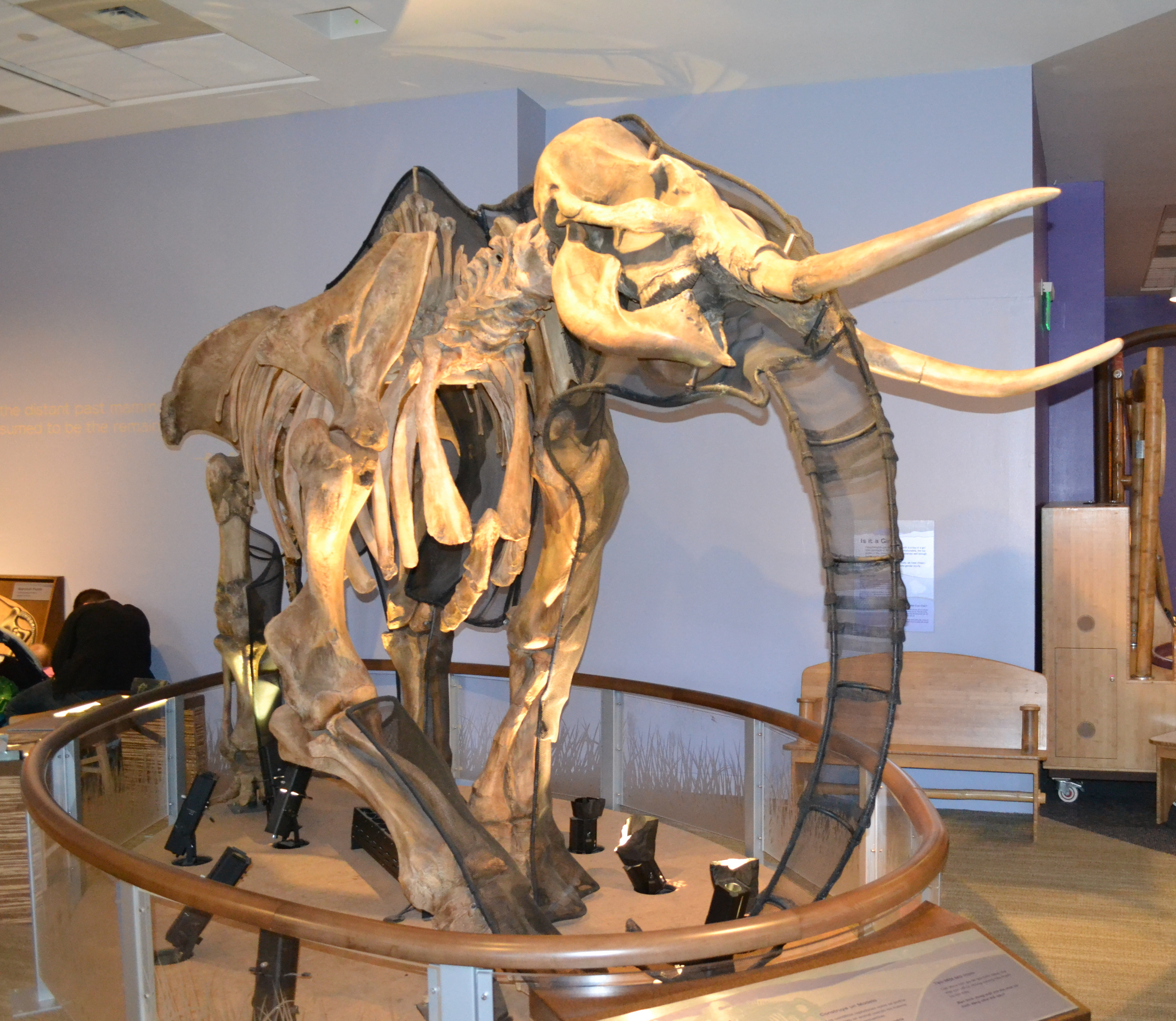
A mammoth skeleton

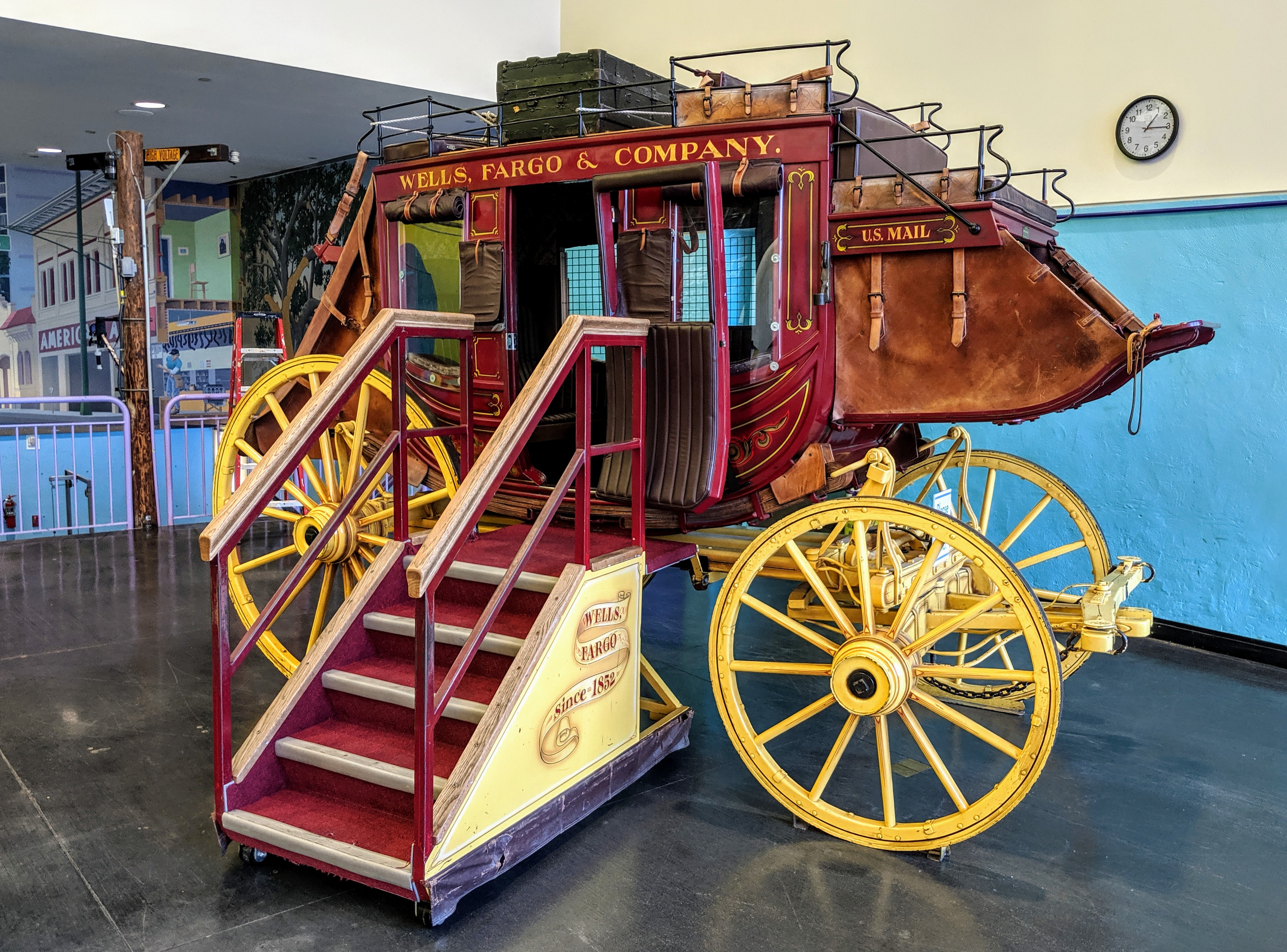
A Wells-Fargo stagecoach

Children's Discovery Museum hosts exhibits, programs and events for families with for children age 10 and under that emphasize hands-on, experience- and inquiry-based learning.

Exhibits include Bill's Backyard: Bridge to Nature, a half-acre outdoor nature exploration space; Mammoth Discovery! an exhibit about paleontology, geology, and the scientific method; and Waterways, where children engage in water play and observe physics principles by interacting with a water vortex, observing laminar flow in action, and experiencing fluid pressure and flow.

Noteworthy programs of the museum include a Cultural Celebrations series; performances by local arts organizations; and events highlighting healthy nutrition and physical activities. Programs in the community include BioSITE, environmental education in partnership with local schools; Youth Programs which reach children after school and during summers; and a partnership with Educare preschool that combines exhibit installations and classes for children and parents.

The museum's Legacy for Children fundraising event has honored notables including Mr. Rogers, Dr. Seuss, Kristi Yamaguchi, Sally Ride, Alice Waters, Ronnie Lott, Sonia Manzano, and Ruby Bridges.

== Discovery Youth ==
Discovery Youth was an after-school and summer program for youth age 10-14 that began in 2001 and ran for many years. Goals of the program included to introduce youth to the technical and creative aspects of producing educational multimedia..

== BioSITE ==
BioSITE was launched by the museum in 1993 as a unique "action-science" education program. Currently the program engages 1,500 students each school year in the importance of environmental responsibility and inspires the love of science through authentic field research conducted biweekly in the Guadalupe Watershed. This program is intended to take science learning out of the classroom and moves it into the real world. The students are given the experiences of biologists, conducting research along the river. Their research is monitored at the Coyote Creek Ranger Station.

== See also ==
- The Tech Museum of Innovation
