= Blue Line (VTA) =

Light rail line in San Jose, California

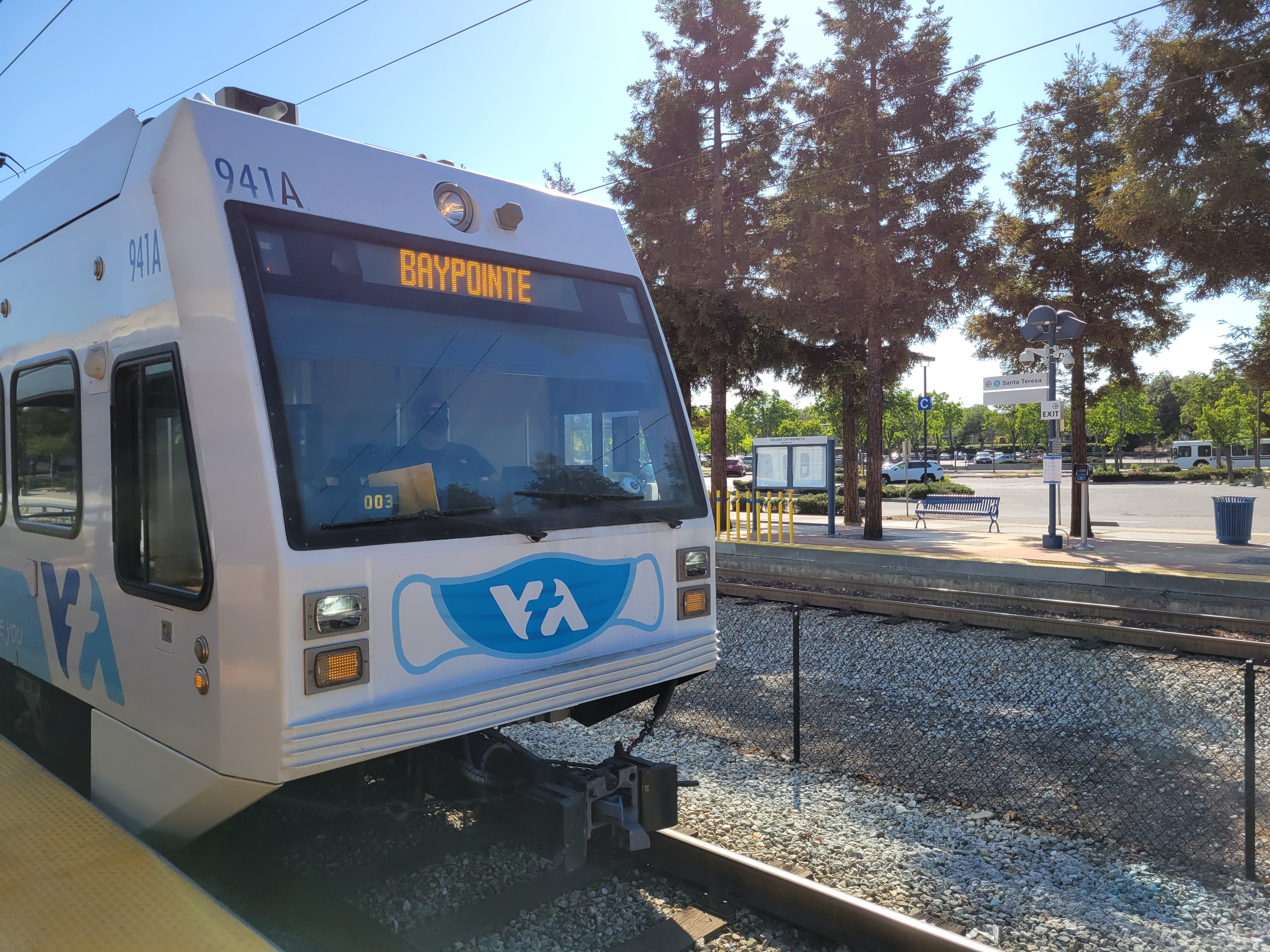
- A Blue Line train at Ohlone/Chynoweth station

Overview
- Locale: Santa Clara County, California
- Termini: Baypointe; Santa Teresa
- Stations: 26

Service
- Type: Light rail
- System: VTA light rail
- Operator(s): Valley Transportation Authority
- Rolling stock: Kinki Sharyo LRV

History
- Opened: December 11, 1987

Technical
- Line length: 17 mi (27 km)
- Track gauge: 4 ft 8 1/2 in (1,435 mm) standard gauge
- Electrification: Overhead line, 750 V DC
Route map
Blue Line highlighted in blue

The Blue Line is a light rail line in Santa Clara County, California, and part of the Santa Clara Valley Transportation Authority (VTA) light rail system. It serves 26 stations entirely in San Jose proper, traveling between Baypointe and Santa Teresa stations, stopping at San Jose International Airport (via a bus connection), Downtown San Jose, San Jose State University, and the Children's Discovery Museum of San Jose along the way. The line connects to Caltrain at Tamien. The Blue Line is one of three lines in the VTA light rail system; the other two being the Green Line and the Orange Line. It runs for 17 miles (27.4 km), making it the system's longest line.

== Route description ==
From south to north, the Blue line starts at Santa Teresa station in South San Jose, then shortly enters the median of State Route 85 until the interchange with State Route 87, where it exits the median and makes a sharp turn to serve Ohlone/Chynoweth station. The route then travels along the median of State Route 87 until just north of the interchange with Interstate 280, where the Blue line exits the median to serve Children's Discovery Museum station. The Blue Line then immediately shares the tracks with the Green Line as the two routes enter Convention Center station and through most of downtown and North San Jose along 1st Street until the Blue Line separates from the Green Line at Tasman station and joins the Orange Line to its terminus at Baypointe. Trains take approximately 55 minutes to complete the entire trip.

The line formerly ran past Baypointe station serving stops all the way to Alum Rock. However, after the 2019 New Transit service plan, the line was cut back and service east of Baypointe is now served by the Orange Line.

== Construction history ==
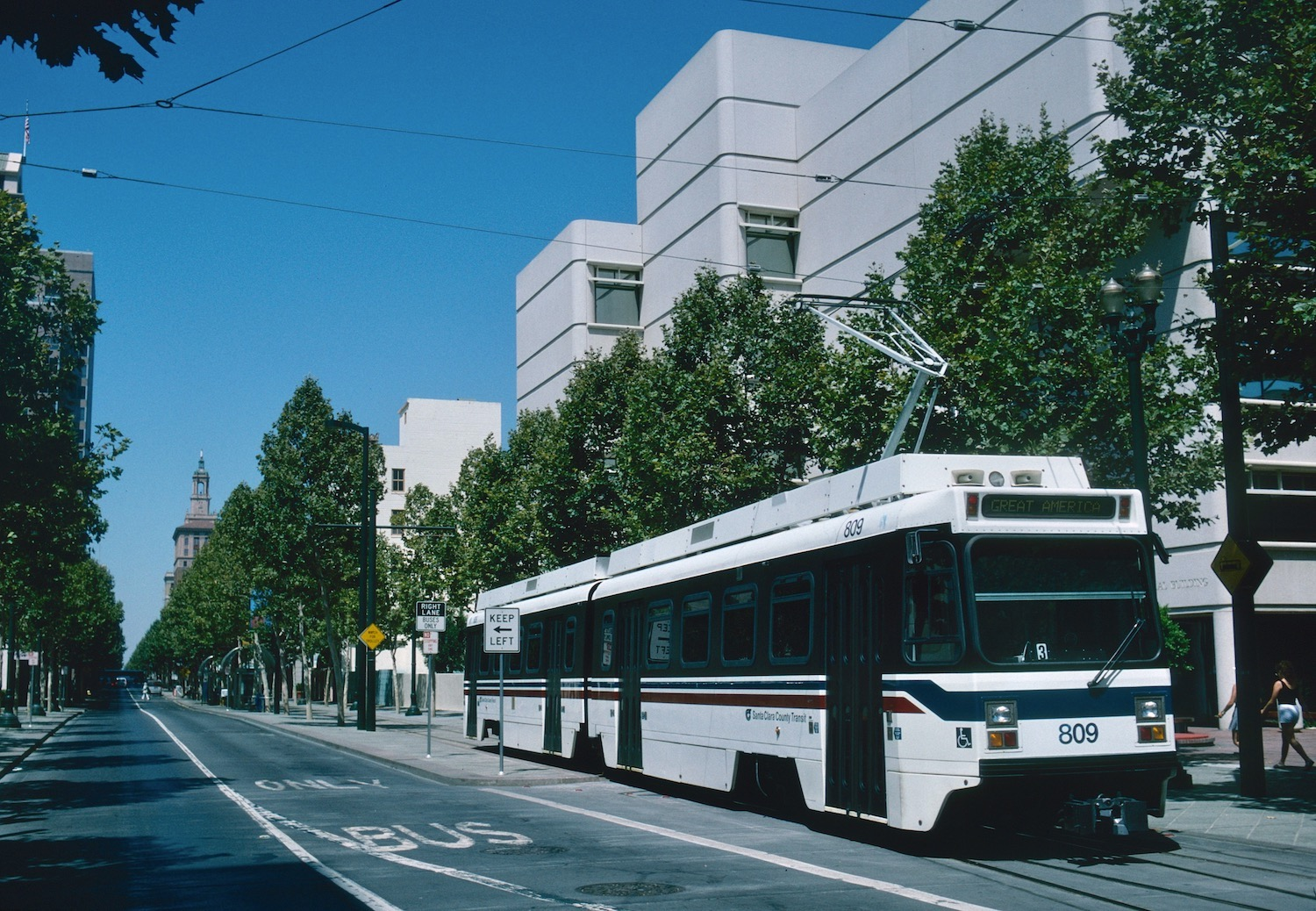
A light rail car of the type in use until 2003, northbound on First St. in downtown, on the section of line that opened in June 1988

The Blue Line largely follows the path of VTA's original Guadalupe line that opened in phases between December 11, 1987, and April 25, 1991.

The first section of the Guadalupe line opened on December 11, 1987, with 7.4 miles (11.9 km) of track allowing trains to operate between Old Ironsides station, located near the California's Great America theme park, and a temporary Civic Center station at First and Younger, near the junction of the branch running west on Younger to VTA's Guadalupe Division, the maintenance and storage yard for trains. The section of track between Old Ironsides station and Tasman station is no longer served by Blue Line trains, but is still used by the Green Line.

The second section of the Guadalupe line opened about six months later on June 17, 1988, with 2.3 miles (3.7 km) of track running from the Younger Street yard junction and a new, permanent Civic Center station in the north to Convention Center station in the south. This section also included a transit mall in downtown San Jose, where train tracks were laid into wide sidewalks, with nearby 1st Street (northbound) and 2nd Street (southbound) being narrowed down and having one lane dedicated to buses. The design allowed easy transfers between trains and buses, but because there is no clear delineation between the sidewalk and the track, pedestrians often unintentionally walk in front of trains, forcing VTA to slow trains to an average speed of just 7.5 miles per hour (12.1 km/h).

The third section of the Guadalupe line opened a year later on August 17, 1990, with 1.7 miles (2.7 km) of track running from Convention Center station to Tamien station, mostly in the median of State Route 87, the Guadalupe Freeway, after which the line was named, itself named after the nearby Guadalupe River. The freeway was built in the 1980s to accommodate the rail line with a large center median and provisions for stations.

The fourth and final section of the Guadalupe line opened the following year on April 25, 1991, with 9.7 miles (15.6 km) of track, continuing down the median of State Route 87 until it approaches the interchange State Route 85, where the tracks briefly exit the median to serve Ohlone/Chynoweth station. After stopping at Ohlone/Chynoweth station, Blue Line trains enter the median of State Route 85 to continue on to Santa Teresa station in South San Jose. The line was constructed at the same time as State Route 85, which was also built to accommodate the light rail line in its median, and had not yet opened to vehicle traffic when trains started running.

The fourth and final section of the Guadalupe line also included a 1.25-mile (2 km) spur track to the Almaden Valley, that was served by the Ohlone/Chynoweth–Almaden line until December 2019, when it was eliminated due to low ridership.

=== Commuter Express light rail ===
On October 4, 2010, the VTA introduced a Commuter Express light rail service on this line, which operated between Baypointe and Santa Teresa stations. The service operated three trips in the morning (northbound to Baypointe) and three trips in the afternoon (southbound to Santa Teresa) that called at all stops, except for nonstop operation between the Convention Center and Ohlone/Chynoweth stations. It offered free WiFi access on all trains on this service, and promised time savings of six to eight minutes. Ridership was low, with Commuter Express trains serving 530 of the more than 20,000 daily riders on the line. The board of directors voted to discontinue the Commuter Express effective October 2018.

== Station stops ==
Stations are listed north to south.

Station	Connections and notes
Baypointe	Orange Line; VTA Bus: 59; ACE Shuttle: Brown, Purple
Tasman	Green Line; VTA Bus: 59; ACE Shuttle: Brown
River Oaks	Green Line; ACE Shuttle: Brown; Park and ride
Orchard	Green Line; VTA Bus: 20
Bonaventura	Green Line
Component	Green Line
Karina	Green Line
Metro/Airport	Green Line; VTA Bus: 60
Gish	Green Line
Civic Center	Green Line; VTA Bus: 61
Japantown/Ayer	Green Line
Saint James	Green Line; VTA Bus: 72, 73
Santa Clara	Green Line; Highway 17 Express; VTA Bus: 22, 23, 64A, 64B, 66, 68, 72, 73, Rapid 500, Rapid 522, Rapid 523, Rapid 568
Paseo de San Antonio	Green Line; VTA Bus: 23, 66, 68, Rapid 523, Rapid 568
Convention Center	Green Line; VTA Bus: 23, Rapid 523
Children's Discovery Museum	VTA Bus: 23
Virginia	
Tamien	Caltrain: Local (limited service), Weekend Local (limited service), South County Connector; VTA Bus: 25, 56; Park and ride
Curtner	VTA Bus: 26; Park and ride
Capitol	VTA Bus: 37, 70; Park and ride
Branham	
Ohlone/Chynoweth	VTA Bus: 64A, 83, Express 102; Park and ride
Blossom Hill	VTA Bus: 27; Park and ride
Snell	VTA Bus: 66, Express 102; Park and ride
Cottle	VTA Bus: 27, 68; Park and ride
Santa Teresa	VTA Bus: 27, 42, 66, 68, Express 102; Park and ride
