= Association of Science and Technology Centers =

US-based non-profit organization

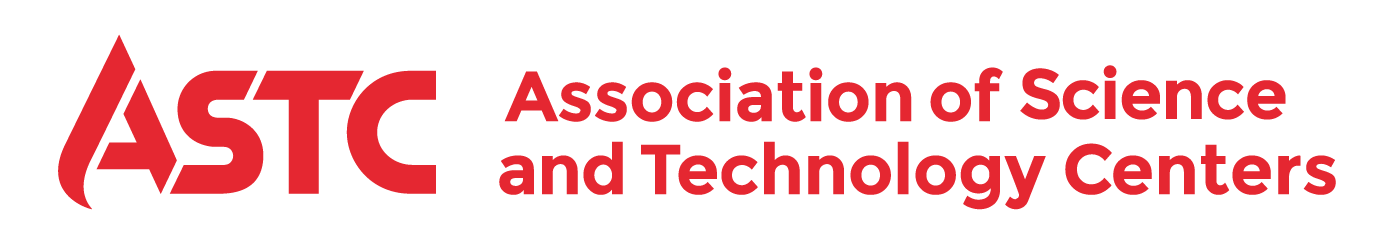
- Abbreviation: ASTC
- Formation: 1973; 51 years ago
- Headquarters: Washington, D.C., US
- President and CEO: Christofer Nelson
- Chair of the Board: Erin Graham (Oregon Museum of Science and Industry)
- Website: astc.org

The Association of Science and Technology Centers (ASTC) is a non-profit, global organization based in Washington, D.C., in the United States, that provides professional support for science centers, museums, and related institutions. ASTC's goal is to increase awareness of the contributions its members make to their communities and the field of informal STEM learning.

Founded in 1973, ASTC represents nearly 700 members in almost 50 countries, including not only science centers and museums, but also nature centers, aquariums, planetariums, zoos, botanical gardens, and natural history and children's museums, as well as companies, consultants, and other organizations that share an interest in informal science education.

== Member programs ==
=== Passport Program ===
ASTC member institutions can participate in ASTC's Passport Program, allowing members of participating institutions to visit other participating institutions for free, provided the member is visiting an institution more than 90 miles from their home institution. More than 300 institutions in over a dozen countries participate in the Passport Program.

=== Annual conference ===
Each year, nearly 2,000 individuals representing science centers and museums from across the world, informal science educators, and companies collaborating with the museum field gather for ASTC's annual conference.

=== Professional development ===
ASTC provides professional development opportunities for those who work in science centers and other institutions of informal learning. ASTC's professional development services include Communities of Practice (CoP), which provides informal science education professionals with resources and support for connecting with colleagues, convening meetings, and organizing workshops, among other activities.

=== ExhibitFiles ===
ExhibitFiles is an online community of exhibit practitioners building a shared collection of exhibition records and reviews. Community members can connect with colleagues, find out about exhibits, and share their experiences. ExhibitFiles was developed to preserve and share experiences and materials that are often unrecorded, temporary, and hard to locate. Visitors to the site can also search for, and post exhibitions rentals and sales.

=== Dimensions ===
ASTC publishes Dimensions, which features in-depth analysis of news and trends in the science center and museum field, in addition to articles about noteworthy events and resources. Dimensions readers include directors and staff of ASTC-member institutions around the world, as well as those with an interest in informal science education. Until 2020, Dimensions was a bimonthly print and online magazine; since mid-2020, it is an exclusively online publication that publishes continuously.

=== Center for Advancement of Informal Science Education ===
ASTC was home to the Center for Advancement of Informal Science Education (CAISE). CAISE supported the informal science education (ISE) community by creating and disseminating resources, as well as encouraging collaboration across the ISE field—including film and broadcast media, science centers and museums, zoos and aquariums, botanical gardens and nature centers, digital media and gaming, science journalism, and youth, community, and after-school programs. Founded in 2007 with support from the National Science Foundation (NSF) Advancing Informal STEM Learning (AISL) program, CAISE was a partnership among ASTC and several co-principal investigators. CAISE managed the InformalScience.org website, which is a repository of project descriptions, evaluation reports and tools, and research papers and products that are collected and curated to provide informal STEM Learning practitioners with knowledge that can be used when developing new work and seeking potential collaborators.

== See also ==
- List of science centers
