= Baypointe station =

VTA light rail station in San Jose, California

Baypointe
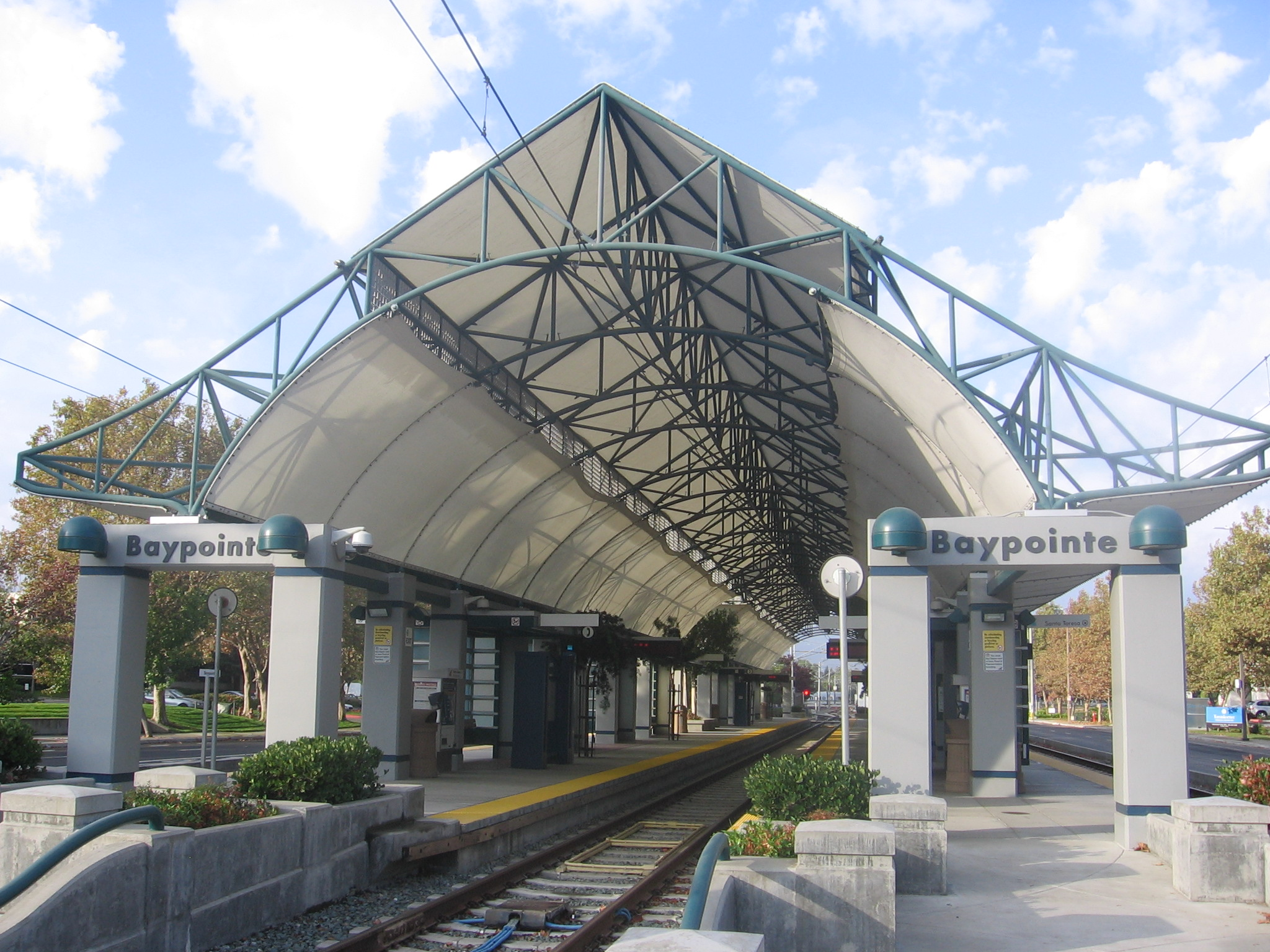
- Entrance to Baypointe station at Tasman Drive and Baypointe Parkway

General information
- Location: Tasman Drive and Baypointe Parkway; San Jose, California
- Coordinates: 37°24′38″N 121°56′31″W
- Owner: Santa Clara Valley Transportation Authority
- Platforms: 2 island platforms
- Tracks: 3
- Connections: VTA Bus: 59; ACE Shuttle: Brown, Purple

Construction
- Structure type: At-grade
- Accessible: Yes

History
- Opened: December 20, 1999; 26 years ago

Services
Preceding station	VTA	Following station
Tasman toward Santa Teresa	Blue Line	Terminus
Champion toward Mountain View	Orange Line	Cisco Way toward Alum Rock
Location

Baypointe station is an at-grade light rail station located in the center median of Tasman Drive at its intersection with Baypointe Parkway, after which the station is named, in San Jose, California. The station is owned by Santa Clara Valley Transportation Authority (VTA) and is served by the Blue Line and the Orange Line of the VTA light rail system. Baypointe station is the current northern terminus for the Blue Line.

Baypointe station is differentiated from other VTA light rail stations as it features three tracks and two island platforms. Blue Line trains stop and reverse direction on the center track, while Orange Line trains use the two outer tracks. Passengers can make a cross platform transfer with either line in any direction.

== History ==
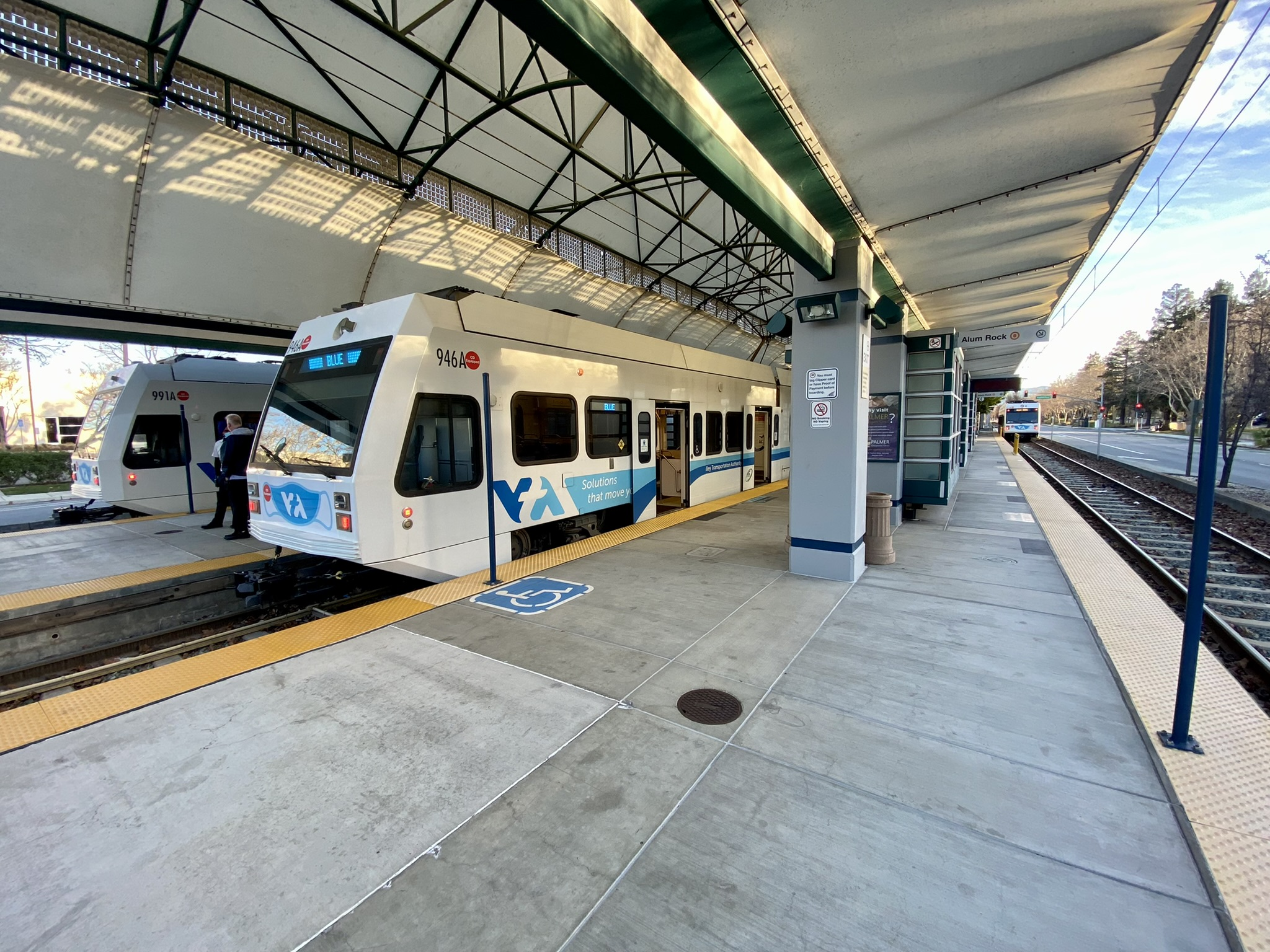
Three VTA Light Rail trains stopped at Baypointe station, 2022

Baypointe was built as part of the Tasman West extension which included the Baypointe station along with 11 other stations and 7.6 miles (12.2 km) of trackway west of the Old Ironsides station (which was part of the original system opened in 1987).

Baypointe was designed to be a terminal/transfer station and consequently has a design with three tracks and two island platforms. The center track is a pocket track that allows trains to park and reverse direction off the mainline. There is an additional 1,000 feet (300 m) of pocket track east of the station allowing trains to be stored in the median of Tasman Drive.

When the Tasman West extension opened in December 1999, Baypointe station was the terminal and transfer station for what was then the "Baypointe–Mountain View" and the "Baypointe–Santa Teresa" lines. In May 2001, when the Tasman East light rail project (segment 1) extended the system to I-880/Milpitas station (later renamed Alder station), the center track of Baypointe station served as the northern terminus for the "Baypointe–Santa Teresa" line and became a through station for the "Mountain View–I-880/Milpitas" line. In June 2004, when the Tasman East/Capitol extension opened, the line from Mountain View was changed to terminate on the center track of Baypointe station and the line from Santa Teresa continued eastward to Alum Rock station.

In August 2005, VTA reconfigured its light rail lines upon completion of the Vasona light rail extension (now part of today's Green Line). As part of this reconfiguration, Tasman station became the transfer point between the newly formed Alum Rock–Santa Teresa and Mountain View–Winchester lines. The center platform of Baypointe station would not see regular use for about five years.

The center platform was reactivated in 2010 for a VTA experiment in offering express light rail service on the Alum Rock-Santa Teresa line. These trains operated nonstop from Ohlone-Chynoweth to San Jose Convention Center. The three northbound morning and southbound afternoon trains used Baypointe as their terminal. The service proved unpopular and was discontinued in October 2018.

On December 28, 2019, the VTA system received a major reconfiguration in preparation for the opening of the Silicon Valley BART extension. The Orange Line was established as an east-west line between Mountain View and Alum Rock, using Baypointe as a through station on the outer tracks. At the same time, the Blue Line was truncated and used the center platform of Baypointe as its terminus. A timed cross-platform transfer is offered between Orange and Blue Line trains at Baypointe.

== Location ==
Baypointe station is located in the median of Tasman Drive just west of Baypointe Parkway in northern San Jose, California. The address is 97 East Tasman Drive.
