= Santa Teresa station =

VTA light rail station in San Jose, California

Santa Teresa
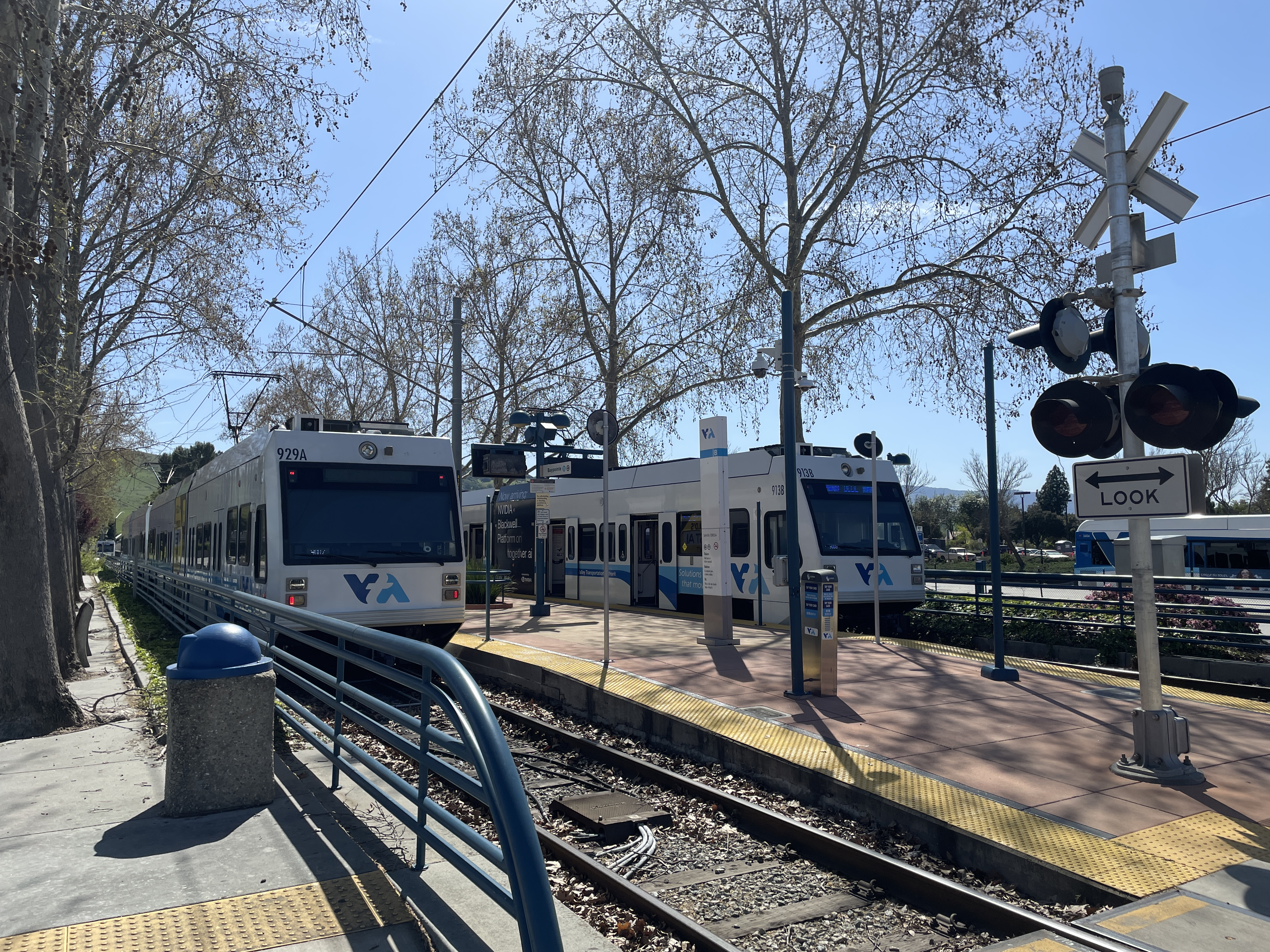
- Santa Teresa station in 2025

General information
- Location: Santa Teresa Boulevard at San Ignacio Avenue; San Jose, California
- Coordinates: 37°14′11″N 121°47′22″W
- Owner: Santa Clara Valley Transportation Authority
- Line: Guadalupe Phase 4
- Platforms: 1 island platform
- Tracks: 2
- Connections: VTA Bus: 27, 42, 68, 66, Express 102

Construction
- Parking: 1,155 spaces
- Cycle facilities: Yes
- Accessible: Yes

History
- Opened: April 25, 1991
- Rebuilt: 2008

Services
Preceding station	VTA	Following station
Cottle toward Baypointe	Blue Line	Terminus
Location

Santa Teresa station is a light rail station operated by Santa Clara Valley Transportation Authority (VTA). This station is the southern terminus of the Blue Line of the VTA light rail system. It was built in the late 1980s and opened in 1991 as part of the original Guadalupe Line, the first segment of light rail that stretched to Tasman in northern San Jose.

Santa Teresa station is located just south of State Route 85, near Santa Teresa Boulevard in the Santa Teresa neighborhood in southern San Jose, California. It is a major local transit center, and as such is the terminus of several bus routes. It is served by a shuttle to IBM's campus in South San Jose.

== Connecting transit ==
- VTA Bus: 27, 42, 66, 68, Express 102

The station is also served by a shuttle to the IBM campus.
