= Chenoweth (disambiguation) =

Chenoweth is a name of Cornish origin.

Chenoweth may also refer to:

- Chenoweth, Ohio
- Chenoweth, Oregon

== See also ==
- Chenoweth Massacre, the last major Native American raid in present-day Jefferson County, Kentucky (Louisville Metro)
- Chenoweth Airpark, a private airport located 3 miles west of The Dalles in Wasco County, Oregon, USA
