= Chynoweth =

Chynoweth is a name of Cornish origin meaning "new house" (chi nowydh) in the Cornish language. It may refer to:

== Places ==
- Chynoweth, Cornwall, a village in St Hilary parish in Cornwall, UK

== People ==
=== Real ===
- Bob Chynoweth (born 1941), Australian politician
- Dean Chynoweth (born 1968), Canadian ice hockey player
- Ed Chynoweth (1941–2008), Canadian ice hockey team owner
- Jade Chynoweth (born 1998), American actress and dancer

=== Fictional ===
- Elizabeth Chynoweth and the Chynoweth family, characters in the Poldark series by Winston Graham

== See also ==
- Chenoweth
- Ed Chynoweth Cup
- Ed Chynoweth Trophy
- Ohlone-Chynoweth (VTA)
- Ohlone-Chynoweth - Almaden (VTA)
