= Blossom Hill station =

Blossom Hill station may refer to:

- Blossom Hill station (Caltrain)
- Blossom Hill station (VTA)
