= Chenoweth =

Chenoweth is a name of Cornish origin meaning "new house" (chi nowydh) in the Cornish language. Chenowith, Chinowith, Chernoweth, and Chernowith are alternative spellings.

== People ==
=== Real ===
- Alice Chenoweth (1853–1925), birth name of American author and activist Helen H. Gardener
- Blair Chenoweth (born 1981), American dance instructor, former Miss Alaska
- Caroline Van Deusen Chenoweth (1846–1917), American educator and diplomat
- Ellen Chenoweth, contemporary American casting director
- Eric Chenowith (born 1979), American basketball player
- Erica Chenoweth (born 1980), American political scientist
- Florence Chenoweth (born 1945), Liberian agriculture and food security specialist
- Francis A. Chenoweth (1819–1899), American politician
- Helen Chenoweth-Hage (1938–2006), American politician
- John Chenoweth (Colorado politician) (1897–1986), American politician
- Kristin Chenoweth (born 1968), American actress and singer
- Laura Chenoweth Butz (1860–1939), American educator
- Lemuel Chenoweth (1811–1887), American covered bridge builder
- Richard Chenoweth (18th century), builder of Fort Nelson, Kentucky
- Vida Chenoweth (1928–2018), ethnomusicologist, marimbist and linguist

=== Fictional ===
- Brenda Chenowith, on the television series Six Feet Under
- Billy Chenowith, brother of Brenda Chenowith on Six Feet Under

== See also ==
- Chynoweth
