= Ohlone/Chynoweth station =

VTA light rail station in San Jose, California

Ohlone/Chynoweth
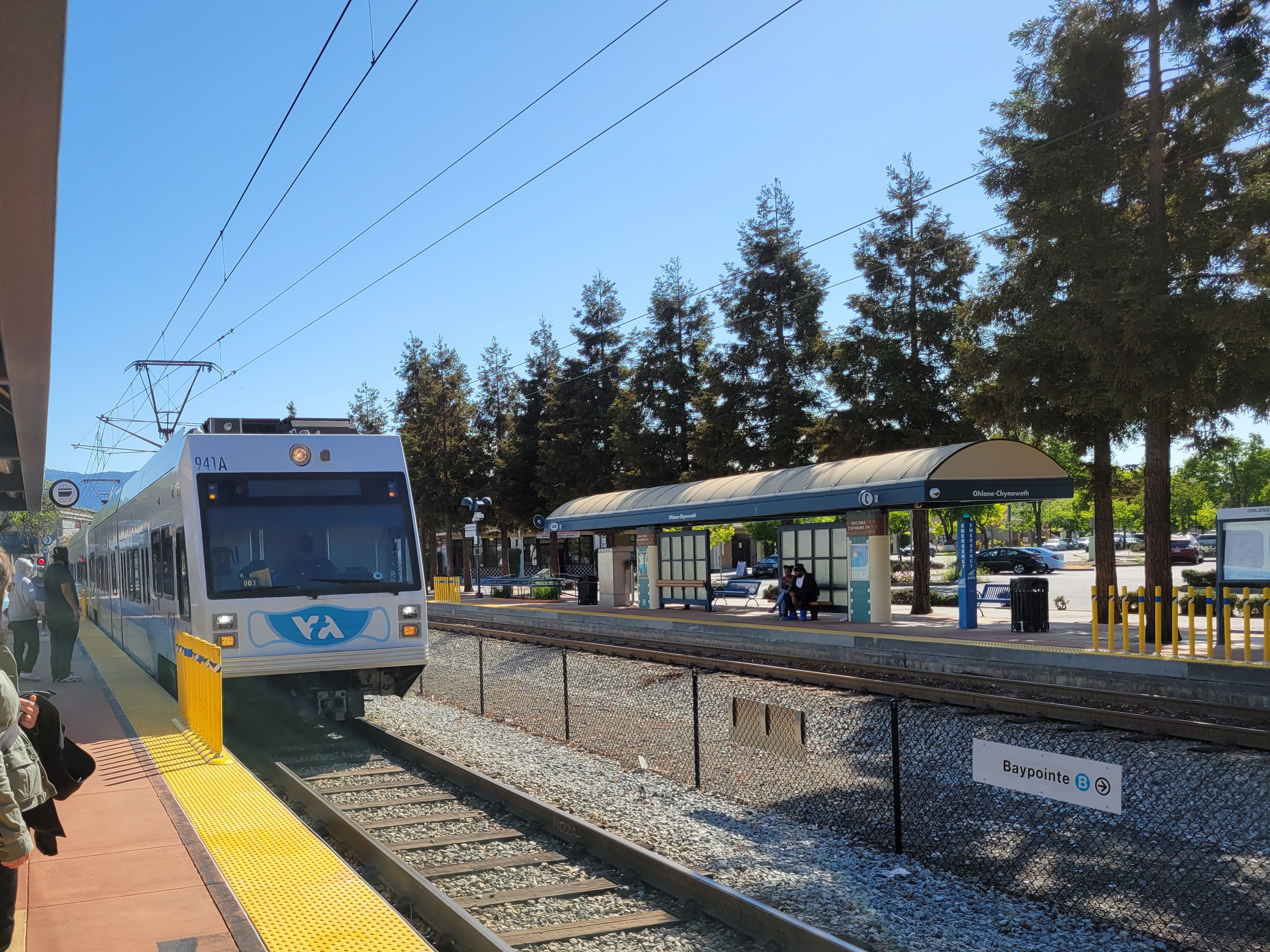
- Ohlone/Chynoweth station platforms in May 2021

General information
- Location: Santa Teresa Boulevard at Highway 87; San Jose, California
- Coordinates: 37°15′28″N 121°51′36″W
- Owner: Santa Clara Valley Transportation Authority
- Line: Guadalupe Phase 4
- Platforms: 2 side platforms
- Tracks: 2
- Connections: VTA Bus: 64A, 83, Express 102

Construction
- Parking: 549 spaces
- Cycle facilities: 24 racks, 22 lockers
- Accessible: Yes

History
- Opened: April 25, 1991

Services
Preceding station	VTA	Following station
Branham toward Baypointe	Blue Line	Blossom Hill toward Santa Teresa
Former services
Preceding station	VTA	Following station
Convention Center toward Baypointe	Blue Line Commuter Express 2010-2018	Blossom Hill toward Santa Teresa
Terminus	Purple Line (former, 1991–2019)	Oakridge toward Almaden
Location

Ohlone/Chynoweth station is a light rail station on the Blue Line of the VTA light rail system. It is located near the intersection of State Route 87 and State Route 85 in southern San Jose, California. Parking lots are located at both sides of the station, the eastern one off Santa Teresa Boulevard, and the western lot accessible from either Chynoweth Ave or Terner Way .

Until the end of 2019, it served as the terminus of the little-used, stub Ohlone/Chynoweth–Almaden line, popularly known as the Almaden Shuttle. It was part of the original Guadalupe Line, the first segment of light rail from Santa Teresa to Tasman. The shuttle was replaced by the 64A bus line.

== Points of interest ==
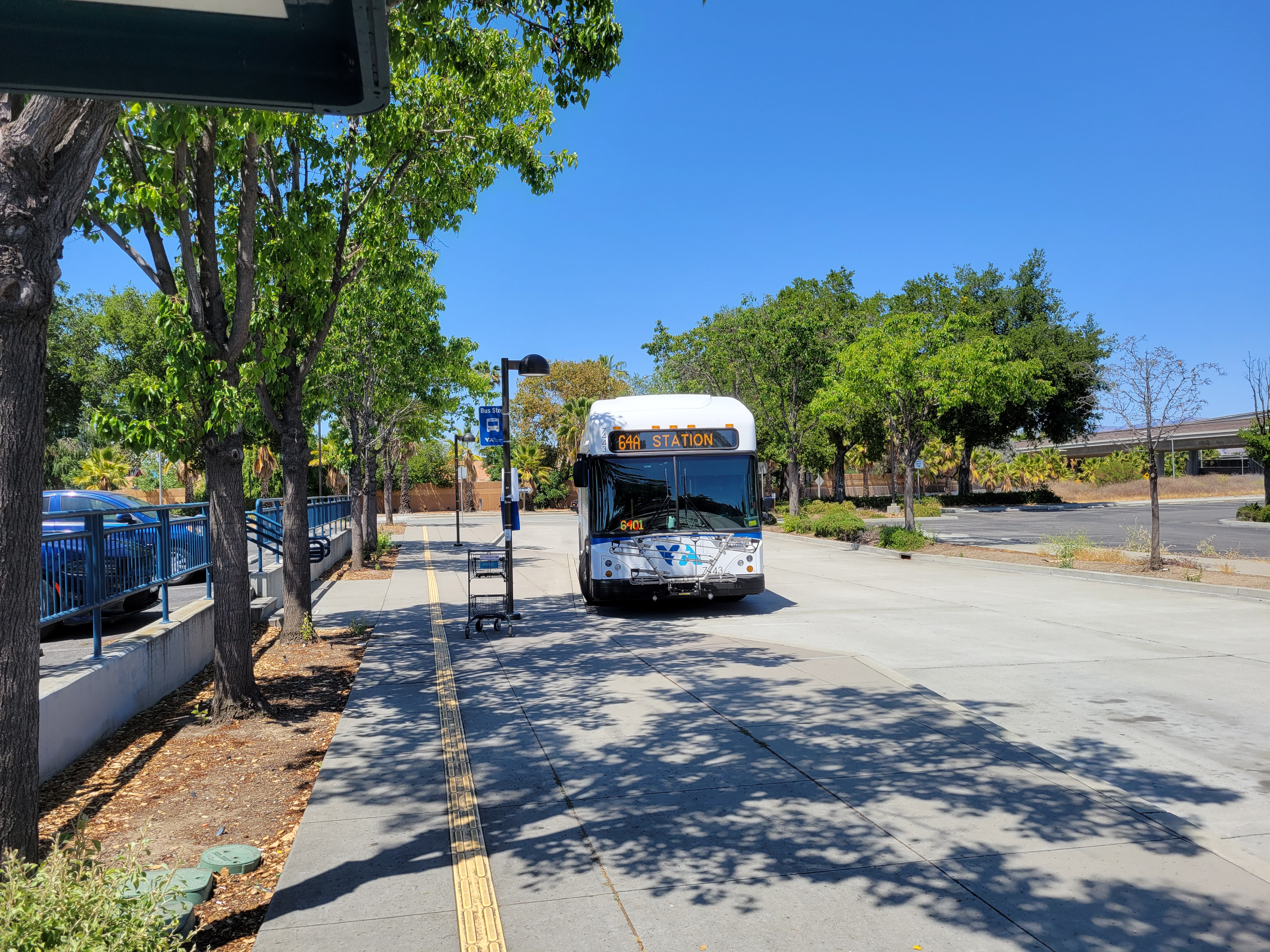
The bus bays at Ohlone/Chynoweth station.

Nearby Gunderson High School is served by this station. Ohlone/Chynoweth is very close to the Westfield Oakridge shopping mall.
