= Branham station =

VTA light rail station in San Jose, California

Branham
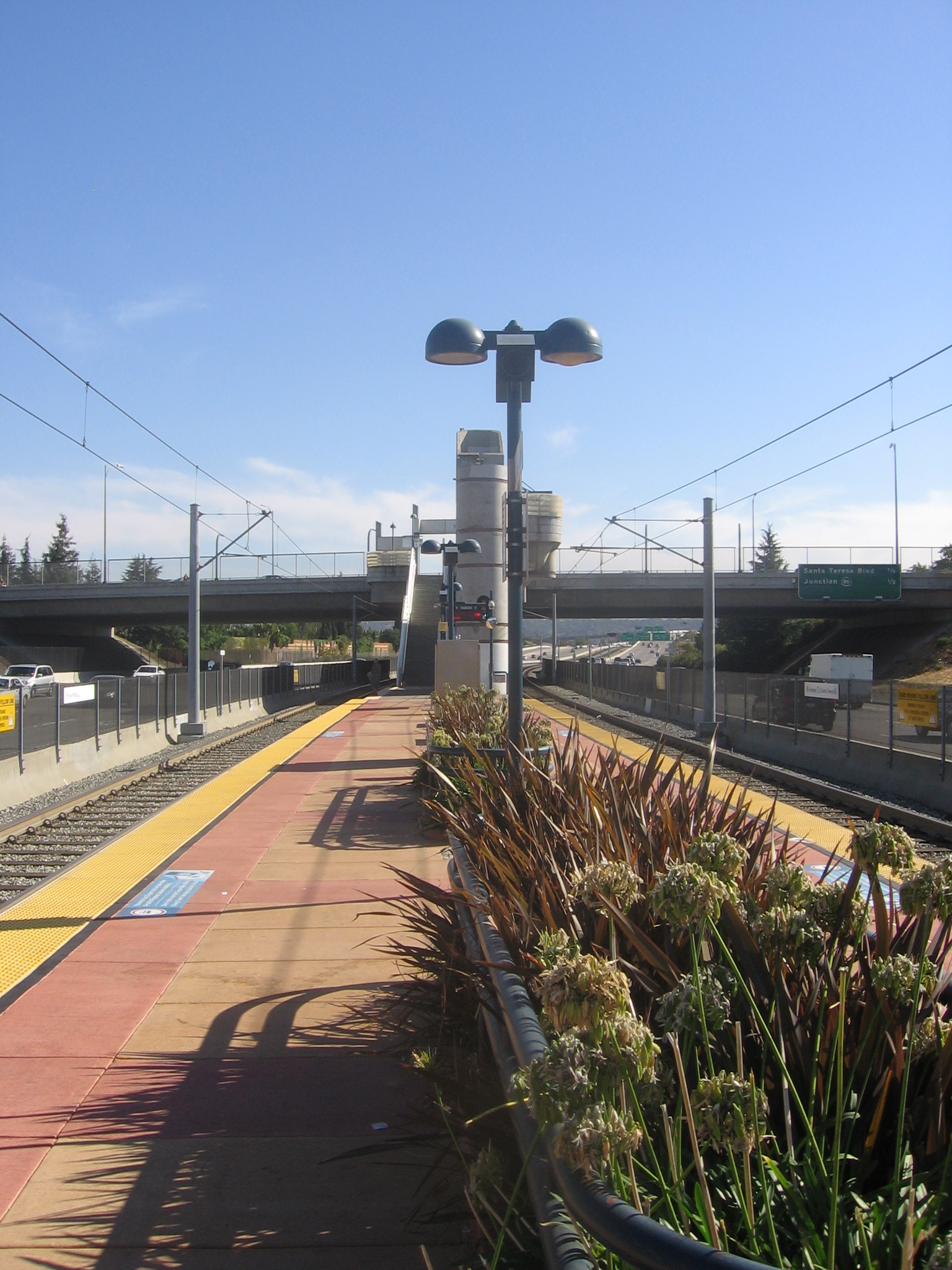
- Branham station platform in 2012

General information
- Location: Branham Lane at Highway 87; San Jose, California
- Coordinates: 37°16′00″N 121°51′33″W
- Owner: Santa Clara Valley Transportation Authority
- Line: Guadalupe Phase 4
- Platforms: 1 island platform
- Tracks: 2

Construction
- Parking: 271 spaces
- Cycle facilities: Yes
- Accessible: Yes

History
- Opened: April 25, 1991

Services
Preceding station	VTA	Following station
Capitol toward Baypointe	Blue Line	Ohlone/Chynoweth toward Santa Teresa
Location

Branham station is a light rail station operated by Santa Clara Valley Transportation Authority (VTA). The station is served by the Blue Line of the VTA light rail system and is connected to the Highway 87 bikeway. Branham station is located in the median of State Route 87, near Branham Lane in San Jose, California. It was part of the original Guadalupe Line, the first segment of light rail from Santa Teresa to Tasman.

== History ==
Branham station is named after the closest cross street Branham Lane, which is named after San Jose pioneer Isaac Branham.

== Future development ==
As of 2021 VTA is holding planning meetings to consider converting the station's 3 acre "park and ride" parking lot into an office or housing development.
