= Oakridge Mall =

Shopping mall in San Jose, California

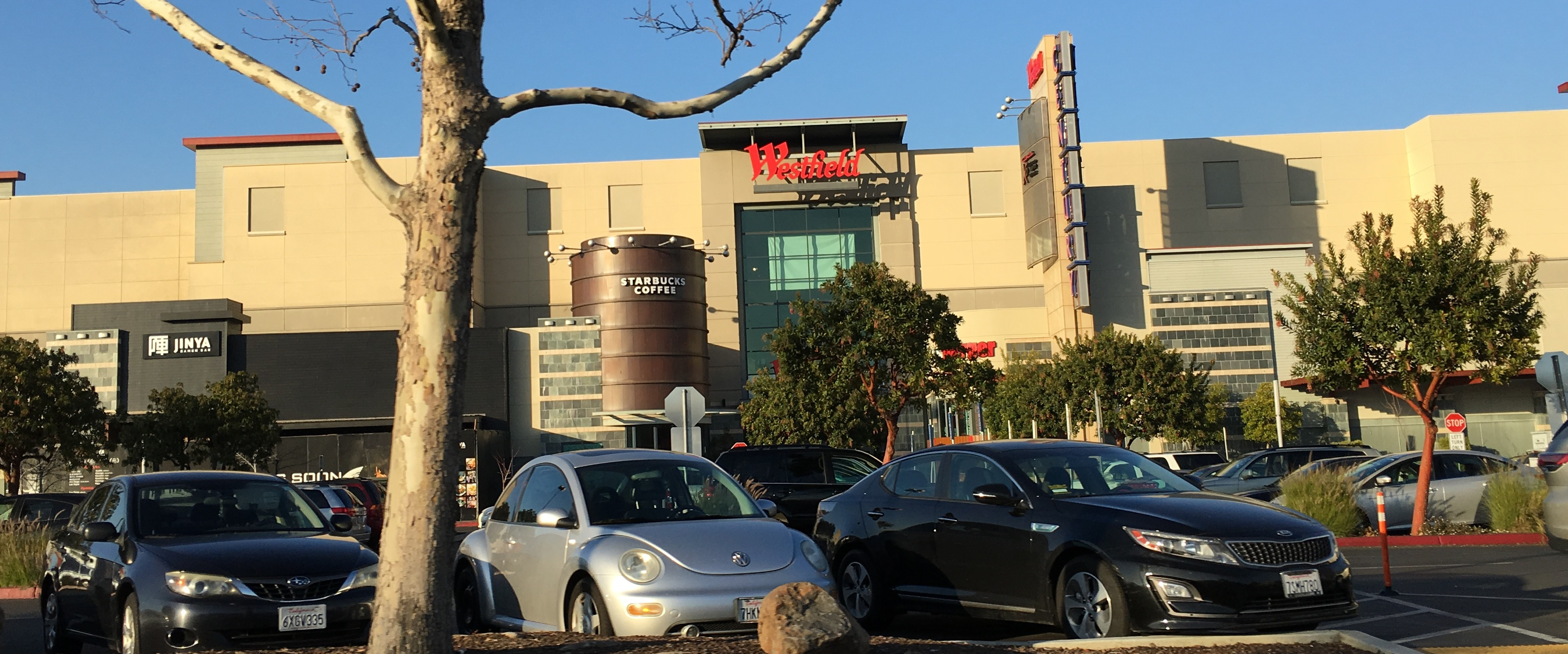
- Frontage from Blossom Hill Road
- Location: San Jose, California
- Coordinates: 37.252492°N 121.861668°W
- Address: 925 Blossom Hill Road San Jose, CA 95123
- Opened: February 7, 1973
- Previous names: Westfield Shoppingtown Oakridge (1998-2005) Westfield Oakridge (2005-2026)
- Developer: The Hahn Company
- Manager: Macerich
- Owner: Macerich
- Num. of stores: 160+
- Num. of anchor tenants: 5
- Floor area: 1,139,602 sq ft (105,872.5 m^{2})
- Floors: 1 with partial upper level
- Parking: 5,002
- Public transit: Ohlone/Chynoweth; Oakridge (Former)
- Website: www.shopoakridgemall.com

Oakridge Mall, commonly simplified as Oakridge and formerly known as Westfield Oakridge, is a shopping mall in San Jose, California, located in the Blossom Valley neighborhood of South San Jose. Established in 1973, Oakridge has been redeveloped multiple times in its history, most recently in 2003, to the cost of $150 million.

== History ==
Oakridge Mall opened on February 7, 1973 as a development of The Hahn Company with opening day anchors Grants and Montgomery Ward. An expansion in 1978 converted the former Grants into mall shopping space, added an additional wing of shops, and new anchors Macy's and Bullock's. Bullock's closed its Northern California locations in 1983 and sold its Oakridge location to Nordstrom; which opened in the building in 1985. Nordstrom opened a new department store at the competing Valley Fair shopping center in 1987, and the two stores existed simultaneously until 1994 when Nordstrom closed its Oakridge store and sold the building to Sears. Following the dissolution of The Hahn Company's retail assets in 1998, Australian developer Westfield Group would acquire the property and rebrand the mall as Westfield Shoppingtown Oakridge.

The bankruptcy of Montgomery Ward in 2001 left an empty anchor slot at Oakridge, originally meant to be occupied by The Great Indoors, a Sears-owned home furnishings concept. Instead, the building sat vacant until 2003, when it was remodeled and replaced by a two-level Target store. At the same time, Macy's added 75,000 square feet to its existing footprint, bringing its total square footage to more than 220,000 square feet.

Westfield began a $150 million multi-phase expansion in the summer of 2002 and was completed in late 2003. The 300,000+ square foot expansion added two new junior anchors, Linens n' Things and a Borders bookstore, as well as a 20-screen Century Theatres cinema and a large food court. A restaurant row fronted the new wing facing Blossom Hill Road. In summer 2005, the mall's name would be simplified to Westfield Oakridge.

The bankruptcies and eventual closures of Borders and Linens n' Things led to two new junior anchors at the center: a Nordstrom Rack opened in place of Linens n' Things, while Forever 21 moved from a smaller in-line space to the former Borders store. A 20,000 square-foot H&M opened in 2011, replacing one of the mall's corridors and several tenant spaces in the process.

Westfield purchased the Sears building at Oakridge and two other properties in May 2017.

On January 4, 2018, it was announced that Sears would be closing as part of a plan to close 103 stores nationwide. The store closed at the end of March 2018. A Living Spaces furniture store took over most of the former Sears building in 2019. 99 Ranch Market opened as an additional anchor in 2022.

On November 16, 2026, it was announced that California-based mall developer Macerich would acquire the property from previous owners Unibail-Rodamco-Westfield for $250 million. Regarding the company's plans for the mall, Macerich CEO Jackson Hsieh stated “Our plan is to add even more compelling experiences, entertainment, dining and wellness concepts that encourage engagement, further increase dwell time/foot traffic and give customers even more reasons to visit the center.”
