= Capitol station (VTA) =

VTA light rail station in San Jose, California

Capitol
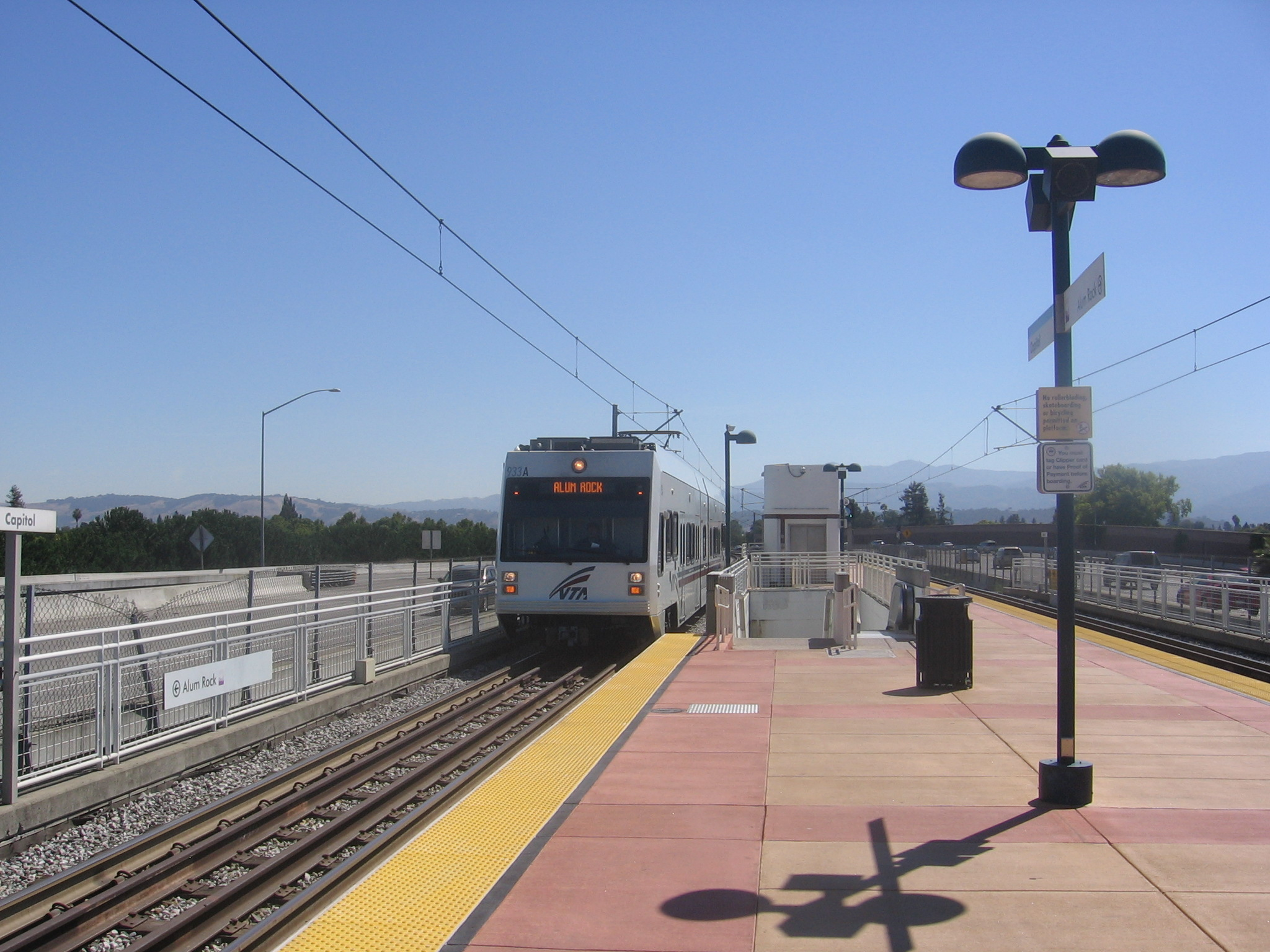
- VTA train at Capitol station

General information
- Location: Capitol Expressway at Highway 87; San Jose, California
- Coordinates: 37°16′28″N 121°51′47″W
- Owner: Santa Clara Valley Transportation Authority
- Line: Guadalupe Phase 4
- Platforms: 1 island platform
- Tracks: 2
- Connections: VTA Bus: 37, 70

Construction
- Parking: 951 spaces
- Cycle facilities: 7 racks, 12 lockers
- Accessible: Yes

History
- Opened: April 25, 1991

Services
Preceding station	VTA	Following station
Curtner toward Baypointe	Blue Line	Branham toward Santa Teresa
Location

Capitol station is a light rail station operated by Santa Clara Valley Transportation Authority (VTA). Capitol station is served by the Blue Line of the VTA light rail system. The Capitol is located in the median of State Route 87, near the intersection with Capitol Expressway in San Jose, California.

The station is connected to the Highway 87 Bikeway

== Connecting transit ==
- VTA Bus: 37, 70

The station is also served by VTA's special service to home games of the San Francisco 49ers at Levi's Stadium.
