= Oakridge station =

Abandoned light rail station in California

Oakridge
- Oakridge station platform after abandonment, 2026

General information
- Location: Winfield Boulevard and Blossom River Way; San Jose, California
- Coordinates: 37.253543°N 121.866896°W
- System: VTA light rail station
- Owner: VTA
- Platforms: 1 side platform
- Tracks: 1

Construction
- Accessible: Yes

History
- Opened: April 25, 1991
- Closed: December 27, 2019

Former services
Preceding station	VTA	Following station
Ohlone/Chynoweth Terminus	Purple Line (former, 1991–2019)	Almaden Terminus
Location

Oakridge is a disused light rail station on the VTA light rail system. This station was formerly served by VTA's Ohlone/Chynoweth–Almaden line, popularly known as the Almaden Shuttle. The station had one platform, and was only accessed by the street. There was no parking available at the station.

== Location ==
Oakridge station is located across Winfield Boulevard from Westfield Oakridge Mall in southern San Jose, California.

== History ==
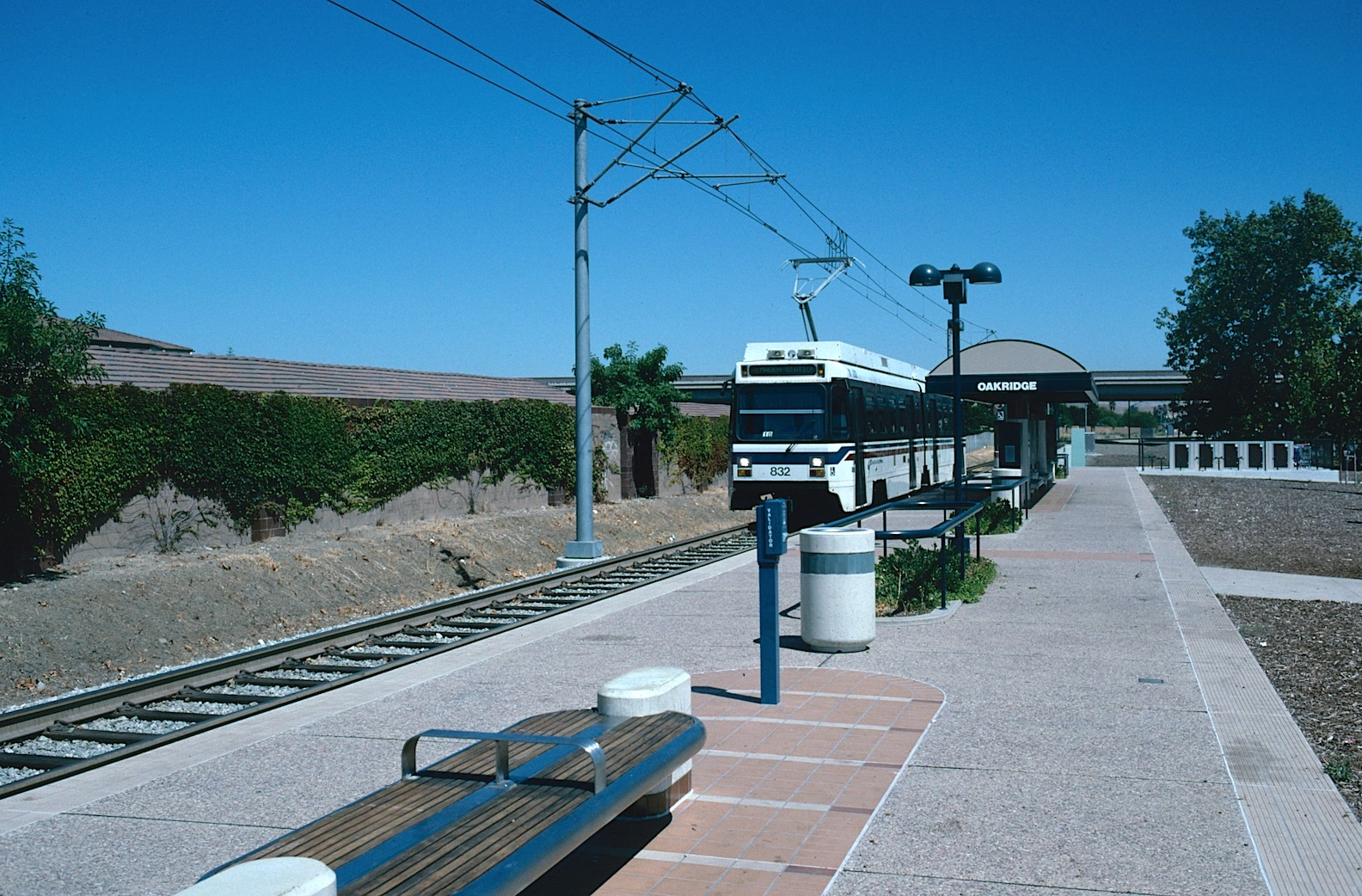
An outbound light rail car arriving in 1993. A single track was used in both directions at this station.

This station is on the former right-of-way of the Southern Pacific Railroad's "Lick Branch," where there was also a track for loading building materials into freight cars. The rail line was abandoned in 1981. The station was closed on December 27, 2019, when the light rail was replaced by a bus service.
