= Chenoweth Fort-Springhouse =

Historic place in Kentucky, United States

- U.S. National Register of Historic Places
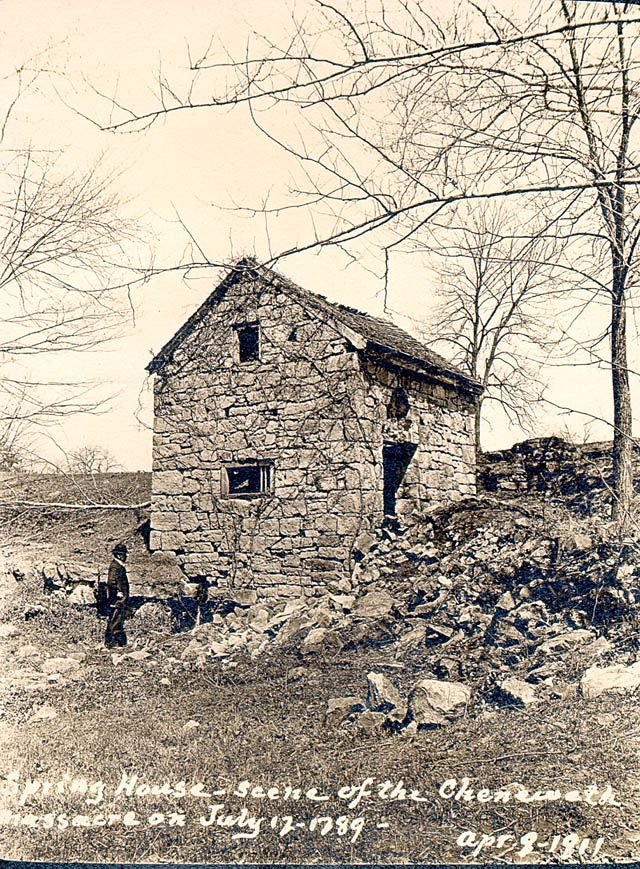

- Location within Kentucky Location within the United States
- Location: Avoca Rd., Louisville, Kentucky near Middletown
- Coordinates: 38°15′41″N 85°30′21″W
- Area: 1 acre (0.40 ha)
- Built: 1786
- Built by: Chenoweth, Richard
- NRHP reference No.: 75000779
- Added to NRHP: July 1, 1975

The Chenoweth Fort-Springhouse is a historic stone structure near Avoca Road near Middletown, Kentucky. Built about 1786, it is believed to be the oldest standing structure in Louisville, Kentucky, and was the site of the Chenoweth Massacre, a 1789 Native American raid during the Northwest Indian War that was the last raid in Jefferson county. The building was listed on the National Register of Historic Places in 1975. It is on privately owned land.

== Description ==
The Chenoweth Fort-Springhouse is on land that is privately owned by Rogers Group Inc, which operates the nearby active quarry that was developed in northeastern Middletown, in a wooded area off Avoca Road. The springhouse is near the junction of two branches of Chenoweth Run. Since construction, it has been separated from the creek by construction of Avoca Road and a railroad spur line.

The stone structure is two stories in height, built in 1778 on an embankment over a spring. It was fortified for defensive purposes. It is accessible either through a ground-level entrance on the lower level, or a secondary entrance on the upper level; the latter would have required a plank or other bridging means to access. The interior includes a loft space that is accessible only by ladder, as part of the defensive measures. The stone of the structure is rubblestone, that has in places been pointed as part of rehabilitation or maintenance.

== History ==
=== 18th century ===
Captain Richard Chenoweth was one of the first white settlers in what is now Jefferson County, in 1778. He acquired land in 1785 along the tributaries of Floyd's Fork in what is now Middletown but was then part of Virginia. There he built a frame farmhouse and the fortified stone springhouse.

In 1789, during the Northwest Indian War, a band of Native Americans attacked his home, killing three of his children and two soldiers in what European Americans term the Chenoweth Massacre. His farmhouse was burned and both he and his wife were wounded, but they took refuge in the springhouse and held off attackers.

=== 20th century ===
Volunteers from Historic Middletown, Inc began restoring the structure in July 1972. At the time the structure was part of the Massacre Trail, a hiking trek done by local Boy and Girl Scouts. In 1975, the structure was added to the National Register of Historic Places.

== See also ==
- National Register of Historic Places listings in Jefferson County, Kentucky
