= Almaden station =

Abandoned light rail station in California

Almaden
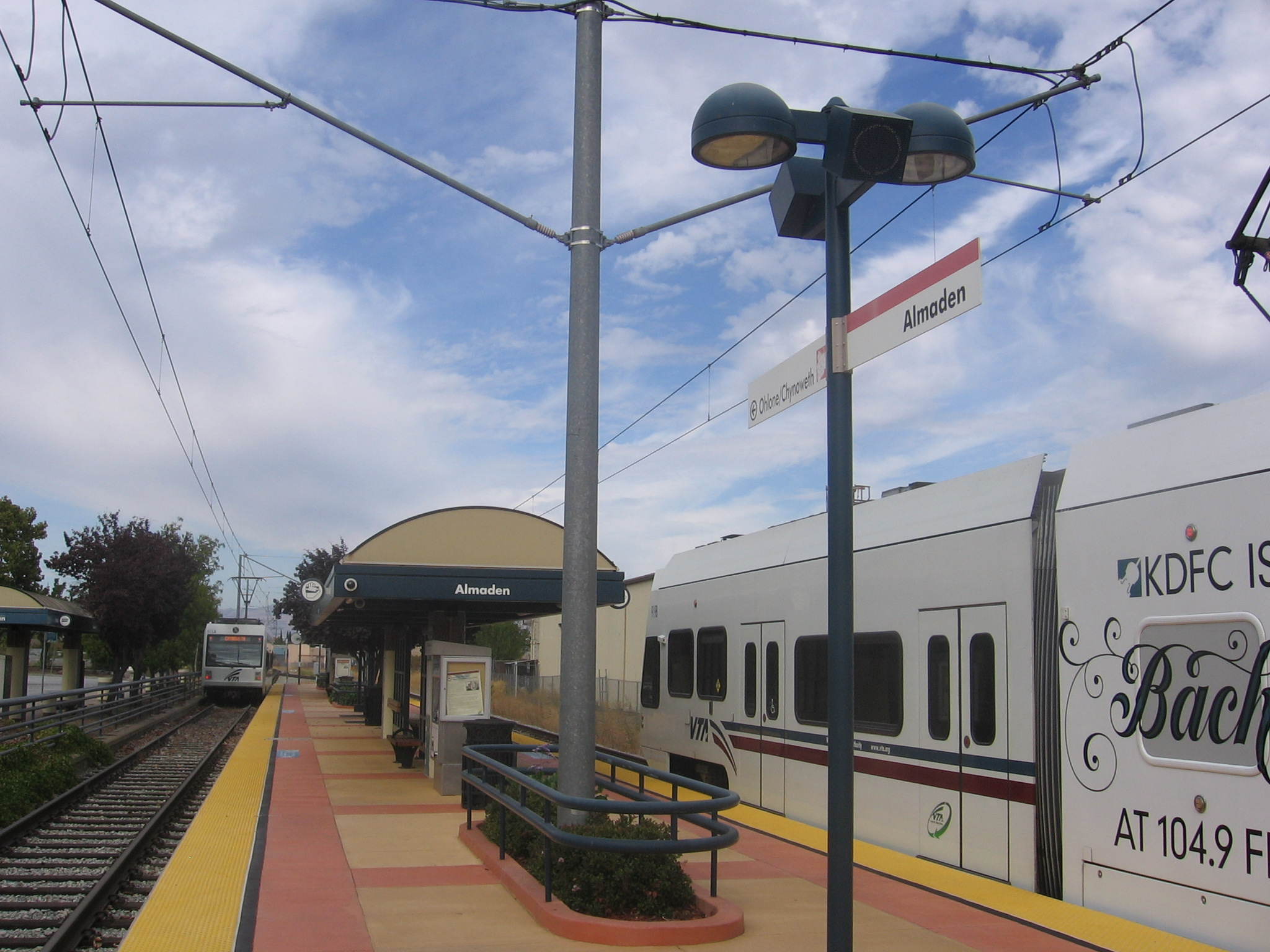
- A VTA train at Almaden station

General information
- Location: Winfield Boulevard and Blossom River Way; San Jose, California
- Coordinates: 37.24493°N 121.870458°W
- System: VTA light rail station
- Owner: VTA
- Platforms: 1 island platform
- Tracks: 2

Construction
- Parking: 189 spaces
- Accessible: Yes

History
- Opened: April 25, 1991
- Closed: December 27, 2019

Former services
Preceding station	VTA	Following station
Oakridge toward Ohlone/Chynoweth	Purple Line (former, 1991–2019)	Terminus
Location

Almaden station is a disused light rail station on the VTA light rail system. This station was formerly the southern terminus of VTA's Ohlone/Chynoweth–Almaden line, popularly known as the Almaden Shuttle.

== Location ==
Almaden station is located near Winfield Boulevard and Coleman south of Blossom Hill in southern San Jose, California. It consists of an island platform, but only one of the two tracks was used in service.

== History ==
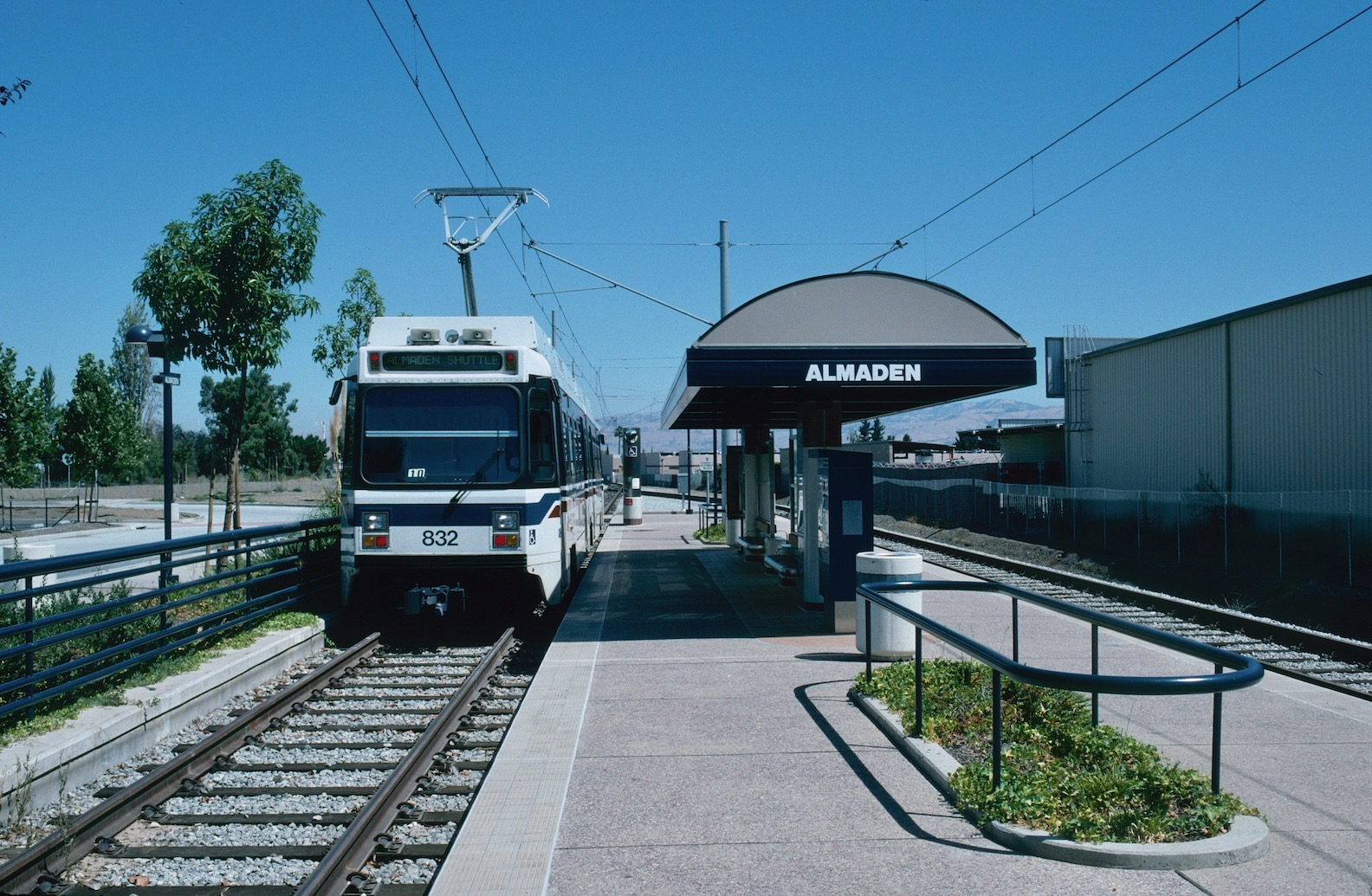
One of the system's original high-floor cars laying over at Almaden station in 1993

First opened in 1991, the station had ongoing issues with extremely low ridership levels which led to its eventual closure in 2019.

This location was once home to a large lumber company and was the southern terminus of the Southern Pacific Railroad's "Lick Branch," which was abandoned in 1981. The station was closed on December 27, 2019, when light rail service was replaced by bus service.

== Station amenities ==
- Bicycle parking
- Payphone
- Park and Ride Lot
- Wheelchair accessible
