= Curtner station =

VTA light rail station in San Jose, California

Curtner
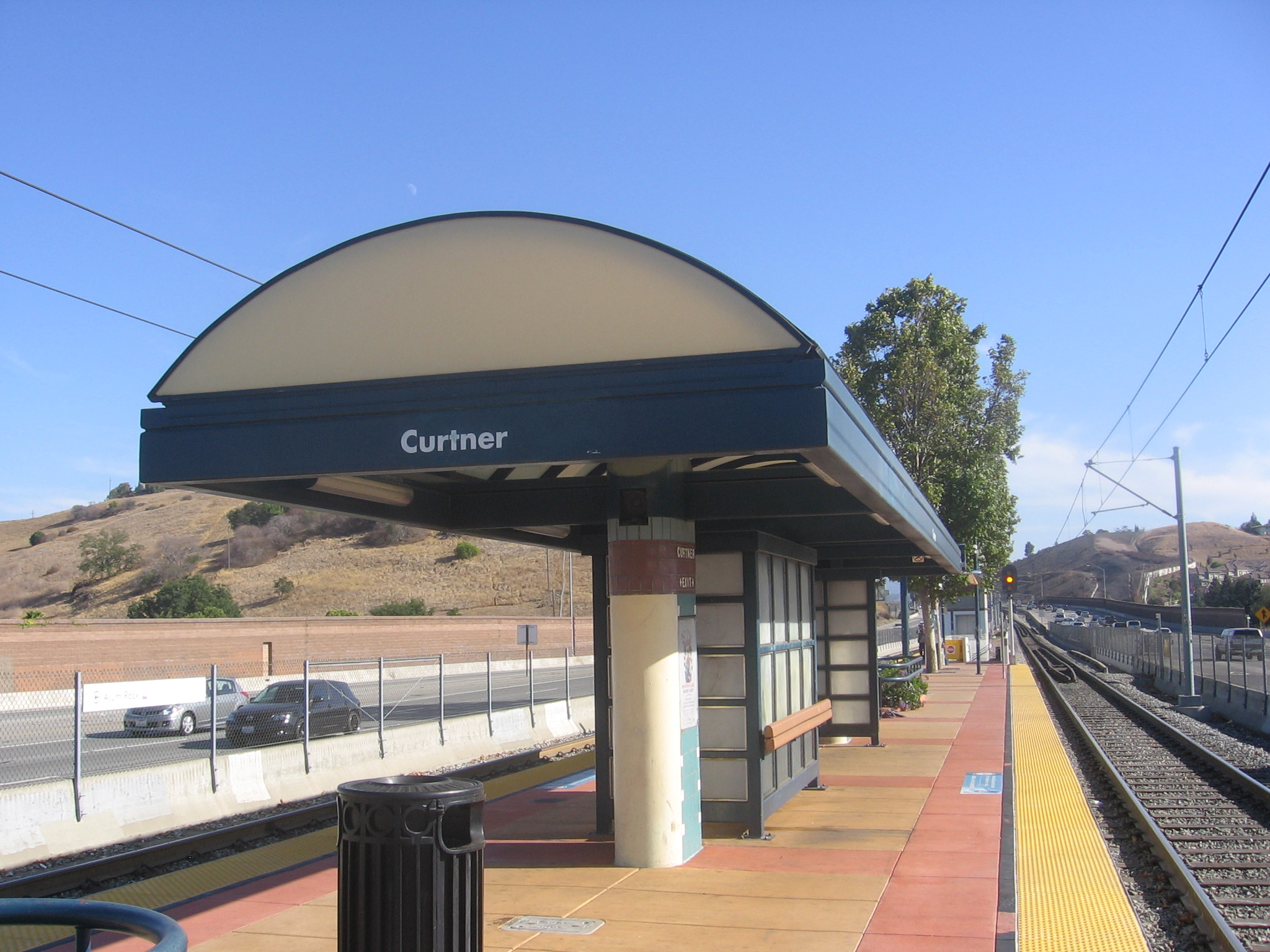
- Curtner station platform in 2012

General information
- Location: Canoas Garden Avenue and Curtner Avenue; San Jose, California
- Coordinates: 37°16′28″N 121°51′47″W
- Owner: Santa Clara Valley Transportation Authority
- Line: Guadalupe Phase 4
- Platforms: 1 island platform
- Tracks: 2
- Connections: VTA Bus: 26

Construction
- Parking: 474 spaces
- Cycle facilities: 12 lockers
- Accessible: Yes

History
- Opened: April 25, 1991

Services
Preceding station	VTA	Following station
Tamien toward Baypointe	Blue Line	Capitol toward Santa Teresa
Location

Curtner station is a light rail station operated by Santa Clara Valley Transportation Authority (VTA). Curtner station is served by the Blue Line of the VTA light rail system. The station is located within the median of State Route 87, where it crosses over Curtner Avenue in San Jose, California.

The station is connected to the Highway 87 Bikeway. This station is in the portion of the bikeway that diverges from the highway and onto city streets.

== Connecting transit ==
- VTA Bus: 26
