= Blossom Valley, San Jose =

Blossom Valley
- Neighborhood of San Jose
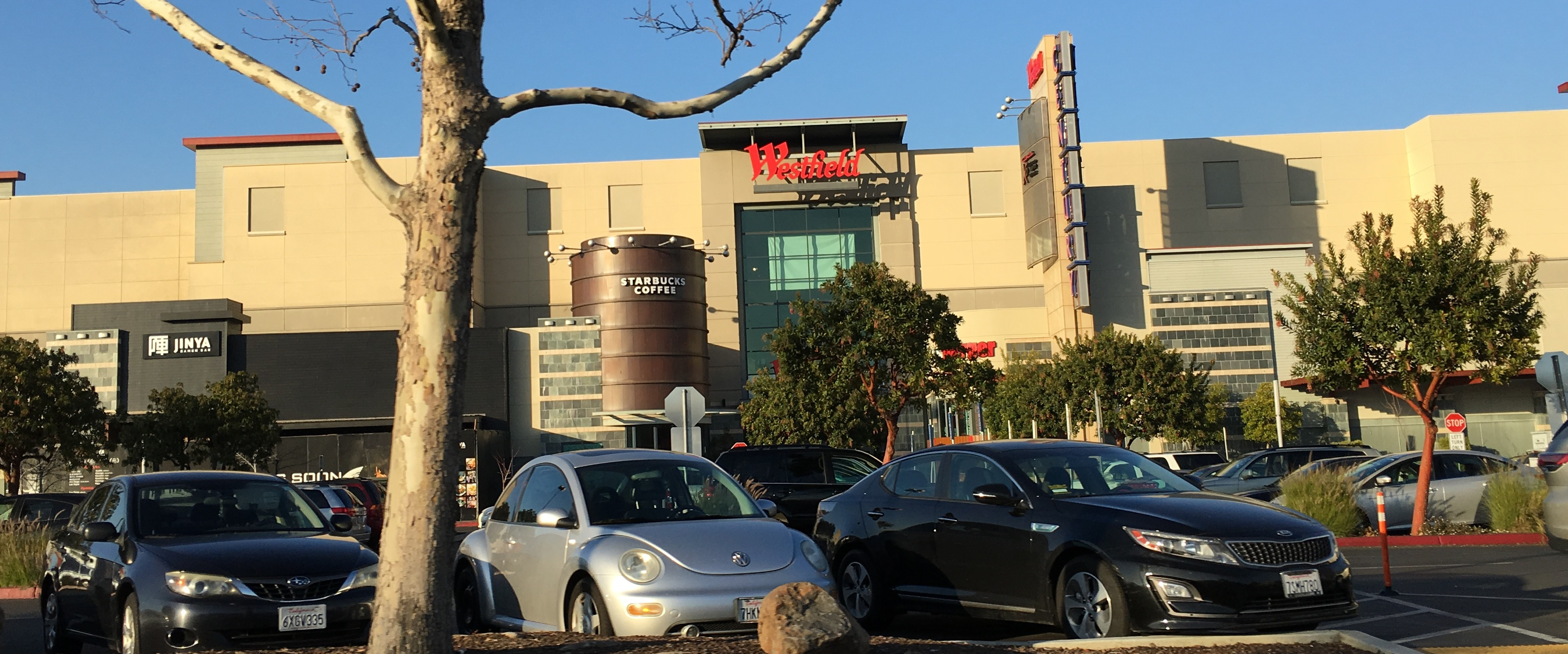
- Westfield Oakridge

- Location within San Jose, California
- Coordinates: 37.256041°N 121.858510°W
- Country: United States
- State: California
- County: Santa Clara
- ZIP code: 95123, 95136
- Area code: 408

Blossom Valley is a neighborhood of San Jose, California, located in South San Jose.

== Geography ==
Blossom Valley is located in South San Jose. It is northeast of Almaden Valley, northwest of Santa Teresa, east of Cambrian, west of Edenvale, and south of Communications Hill.

Blossom Valley lies within the 95123 and 95136 zip codes.

== Economy ==
The Westfield Oakridge Mall provides major department and specialty stores to Blossom Valley.

== Education ==
Schools in Blossom Valley include:

- Communitas Charter High School
- Gunderson High School
- Oak Grove High School.
