= Blossom Hill station (VTA) =

VTA light rail station in San Jose, California

Blossom Hill
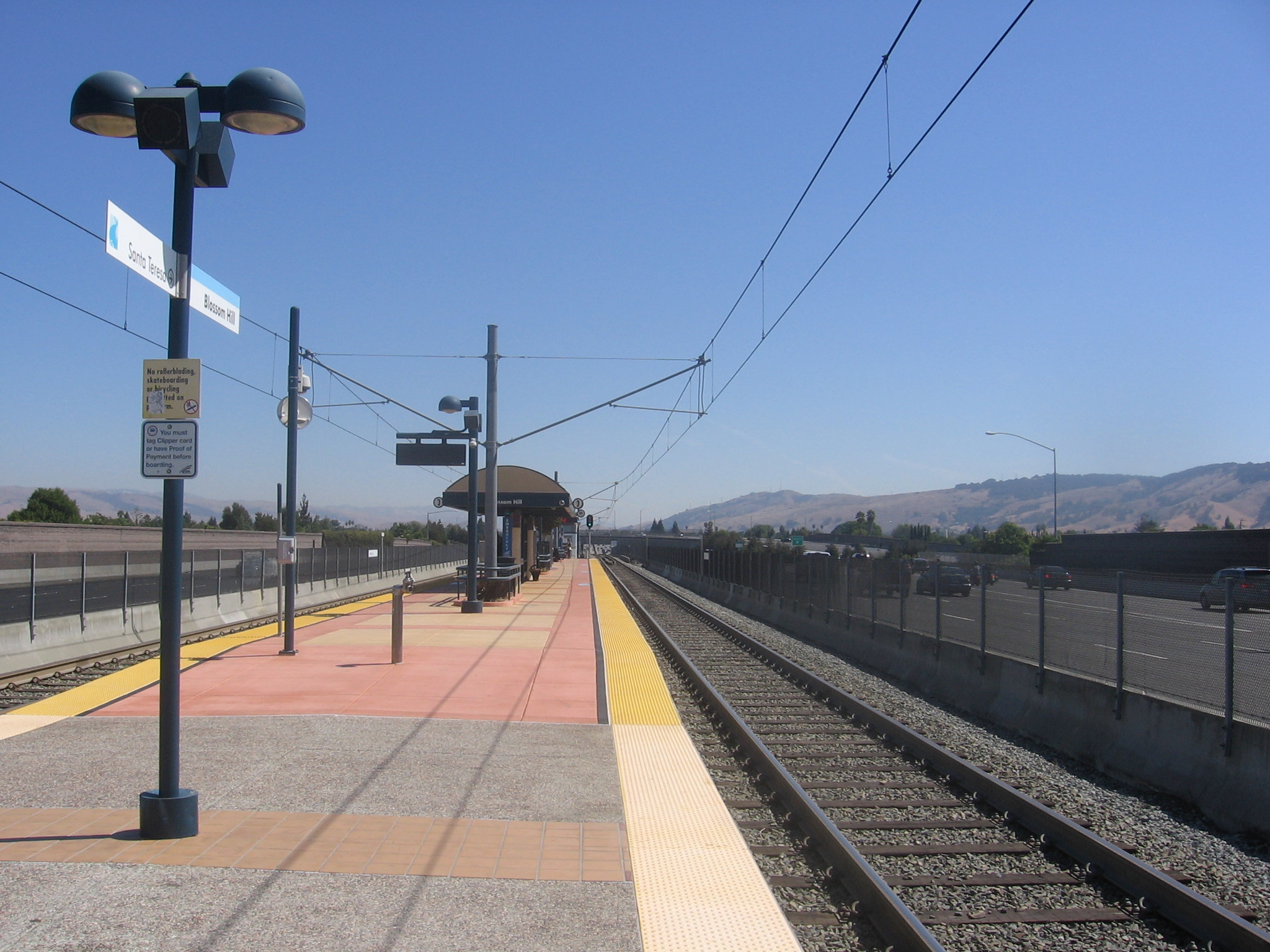
- Station platform in 2012

General information
- Location: Blossom Hill Road at Highway 85; San Jose, California
- Coordinates: 37°15′11″N 121°50′29″W
- Owner: Santa Clara Valley Transportation Authority
- Line: Guadalupe Phase 4
- Platforms: 1 island platform
- Tracks: 2
- Connections: VTA Bus: 27

Construction
- Parking: 511 spaces
- Cycle facilities: Yes
- Accessible: Yes

History
- Opened: April 25, 1991
- Rebuilt: 2008

Services
| Preceding station | VTA | Following station |
|---|---|---|
| Ohlone/Chynoweth toward Baypointe | Blue Line | Snell toward Santa Teresa |
Location

Blossom Hill station is a light rail station operated by Santa Clara Valley Transportation Authority (VTA). The station is served by the Blue Line of the VTA light rail system. Blossom Hill station is located in the median of State Route 85, just north of Blossom Hill Road in San Jose, California. It was part of the original Guadalupe Line, the first segment of light rail from Santa Teresa to Tasman.
