= Purple Line (VTA) =

Discontinued light rail line in San Jose, California

Ohlone/Chynoweth–Almaden

Overview
- Locale: Santa Clara County, California; Cities: San Jose
- Termini: Ohlone/Chynoweth; Almaden
- Stations: 3

Service
- Type: Light rail
- System: VTA light rail
- Operator(s): Santa Clara Valley Transportation Authority
- Rolling stock: 99 Kinki Sharyo light rail vehicles (low floor)

History
- Opened: April 25, 1991
- Closed: December 27, 2019

Technical
- Line length: 1.25 mi (2 km)
- Number of tracks: 1 (except at the two terminals)
- Character: at-grade
- Track gauge: 4 ft 8 1/2 in (1,435 mm) standard gauge
- Electrification: Overhead line, 750 V DC
Route map
Ohlone/Chynoweth–Almaden highlighted in purple

Ohlone/Chynoweth–Almaden (commonly known as the Almaden Shuttle) was a short light rail route operated by Santa Clara Valley Transportation Authority (VTA) in southern San Jose, California, United States, with three stops. Service into the Almaden Valley was also provided by VTA bus route 13, which also entirely duplicates the light rail service. VTA proposed to end service on the Ohlone/Chynoweth–Almaden line in late 2019, and officially announced plans to terminate service on the line and replace it with bus 64a on December 28, 2019.

On VTA maps, this line was colored purple, but VTA personnel does not call it the Purple Line, much less refer to it as the Line 900 on official documents. The system's other two lines at the time were the Alum Rock–Santa Teresa line and the Mountain View–Winchester line. Twice per day, a train from the Alum Rock–Santa Teresa line would throughrun from the VTA yards south of Gish station to serve the Almaden Shuttle. The train arrived from the yards early in the morning and left for the yards again after the last Almaden Shuttle run of the evening.

== History ==
The entire Ohlone/Chynoweth–Almaden line was constructed at the same time as the original Guadalupe line; both lines opened for revenue service in 1991. The line is a branch off of the main line but was served mainly by a shuttle service, known as the Almaden Shuttle, with a few through trains to/from downtown and points beyond in rush hour only. The few through trips were discontinued in January 1993. The line is 1.25 mi (2 km) long and is single-track except at its two terminals.

Once the line begins to parallel Winfield Boulevard, the Almaden line runs on the right-of-way of an abandoned branch of the Southern Pacific Railroad. This branch (known as the Lick Branch) once served the quicksilver mining area of New Almaden, located south of San Jose. In later years, it ended at the current site of the Almaden Light Rail Station and served a lumber yard. The freight railroad was abandoned in 1981.

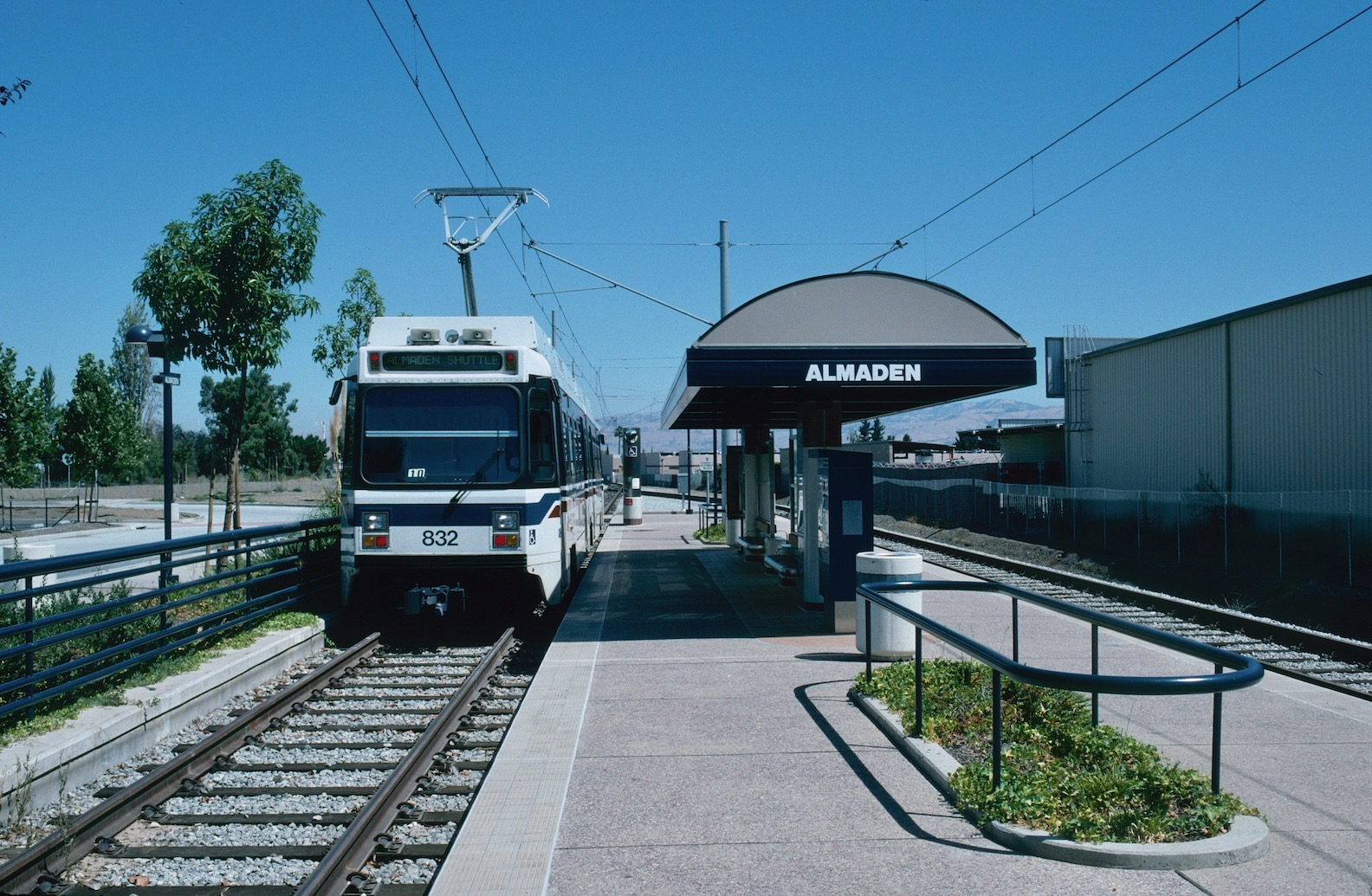
A light rail car laying over at the outer end of the line in 1993

Ridership on the Almaden Shuttle was notoriously poor. The Almaden Shuttle was proposed for cancellation in 2003 and 2004 as part of massive agency-wide service cuts as a result of the dot-com bust, especially considering that for many Almaden Valley residents who choose transit, VTA's number 13 bus duplicated the Almaden Shuttle's service (providing service to downtown San Jose via the Alum Rock–Santa Teresa line with only one transfer). If the Almaden Shuttle were canceled, it would have been the first federally funded light rail line built after 1980 ever to cease service. Ultimately, a decision was made to keep the shuttle and reduce service on parallel bus routes instead.

VTA closed all three stations on this line for renovation in April 2008 to provide level boarding at all doors. In 2009, the line was again proposed for discontinuation, although modified weekend-only service was a possibility.

In 2019, the Almaden Shuttle's color on system maps changed from orange to purple, in preparation for a Mountain View–Alum Rock Orange Line to be inaugurated later that year. In a 2019 draft plan, VTA proposed to end service on the Ohlone/Chynoweth–Almaden line in favor of a Route 80 bus line; the final approved plan called for termination of service on December 28, 2019, with the replacement being bus 64a.

== Station stops ==
| Station | Other lines | Transfer to |
|---|---|---|
| Ohlone/Chynoweth | Blue Line | VTA: Alum Rock–Santa Teresa LRT, 13 |
| Oakridge (Note: Oakridge Mall is adjacent to this station.) | | VTA: 13 |
| Almaden | | VTA: 13, 64 |

=== Station facilities ===
All stations along this line had bike stations, and the Ohlone/Chynoweth and Almaden stations also had park-and-ride lots.
