= Caroline Van Deusen Chenoweth =

American vice-consul and educator (1846–1917)

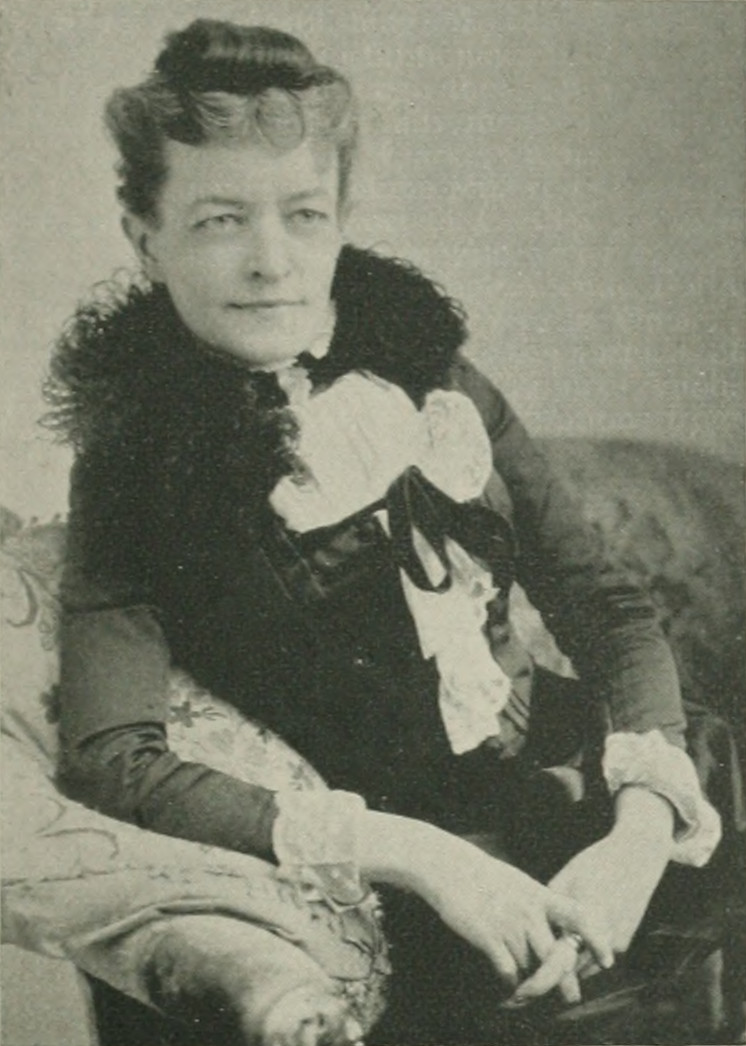
- Born: December 29, 1846
- Died: 1917
- Occupation(s): educator, diplomat

Caroline Van Deusen Chenoweth (December 29, 1846 – 1917) was an American educator and vice-consul for Canton, China.

The daughter of Charles Van Deusen and Stary Huntington, she was born Caroline Van Deusen at the family's summer home on the Ohio River opposite Louisville, Kentucky. She was educated at the St. Charles Institute in New Orleans and at Moores Hill College. She taught private classes in Boston and was a professor of English literature at Smith College.

She married Colonel Bernard Peel Chenoweth in 1863. Her husband served as American consul for Canton, China; during her husband's illness and for several months following his death in 1870, she served as vice-consul. Her name was put forward for the post of American consul; her candidacy was supported by President Grant but was opposed by Secretary of State Hamilton Fish. In 1873, she was named a clerk at the Boston custom house.

Chenoweth founded the Colonel Timothy Bigelow Chapter of the Daughters of the American Revolution. She was a member of the Society for Psychical Research in London.

She was author of Stories of the Saints (1880), Child Life in China (1882) and Colonel John Hazeltine, an Undistinguished Citizen (1900).
