= Chenoweth Massacre =

Kentucky Native American raid

Coordinates: 38.261°N 85.508°W

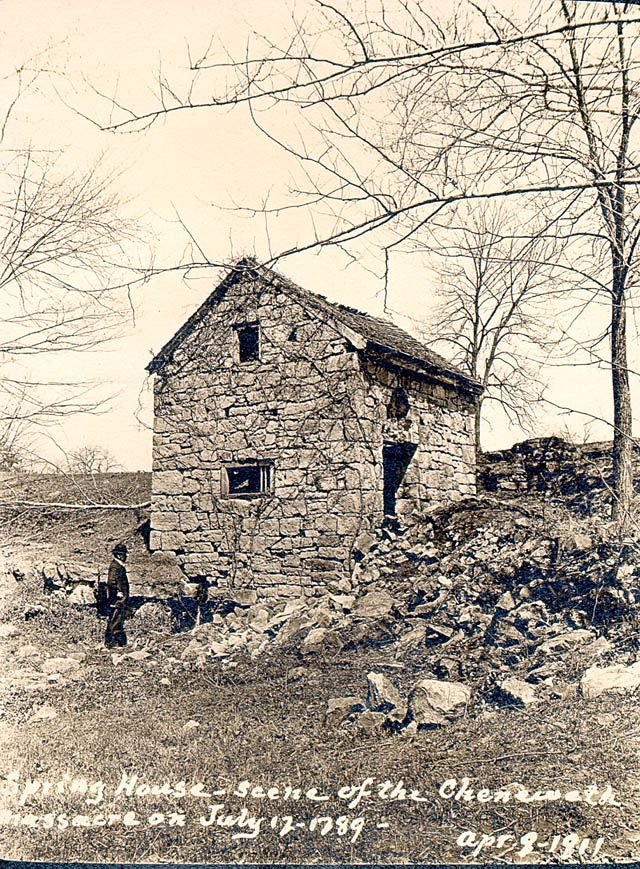
Chenoweth Fort-Springhouse photographed by tourists, 1911

The Chenoweth Massacre of July 17, 1789 was the last major Native American raid in present-day Louisville, Kentucky.

Captain Richard Chenoweth, builder of Fort Nelson, was stationed with his family northeast of present-day Middletown when a large band of Native Americans (likely Shawnee) attacked from across the Ohio River. They killed three of Chenoweth's children, Levi, Margaret and Polly and two of the soldiers. Chenoweth's wife, Margaret "Peggy" née McCarthy was pierced through the lungs by an arrow and seriously wounded. She faked death while an attacker took her scalp. She survived and wore a hat for the rest of her life to conceal the scars. Two soldiers were captured alive and were ritually burned at the stake near the springhouse.

Chenoweth Station was likely targeted in the raid because it was relatively isolated from the nearest settlements of Linn's Station and the Falls of the Ohio. What is now called the Chenoweth Fort-Springhouse, where Chenoweth and his wife took refuge, has been preserved and is listed on the National Register of Historic Places.

== See also ==
- History of Louisville, Kentucky
